= 1969 Norwegian parliamentary election =

- 7 and 8 September 1969

All 150 seats in the Storting 76 seats needed for a majority
- Turnout: 83.8%
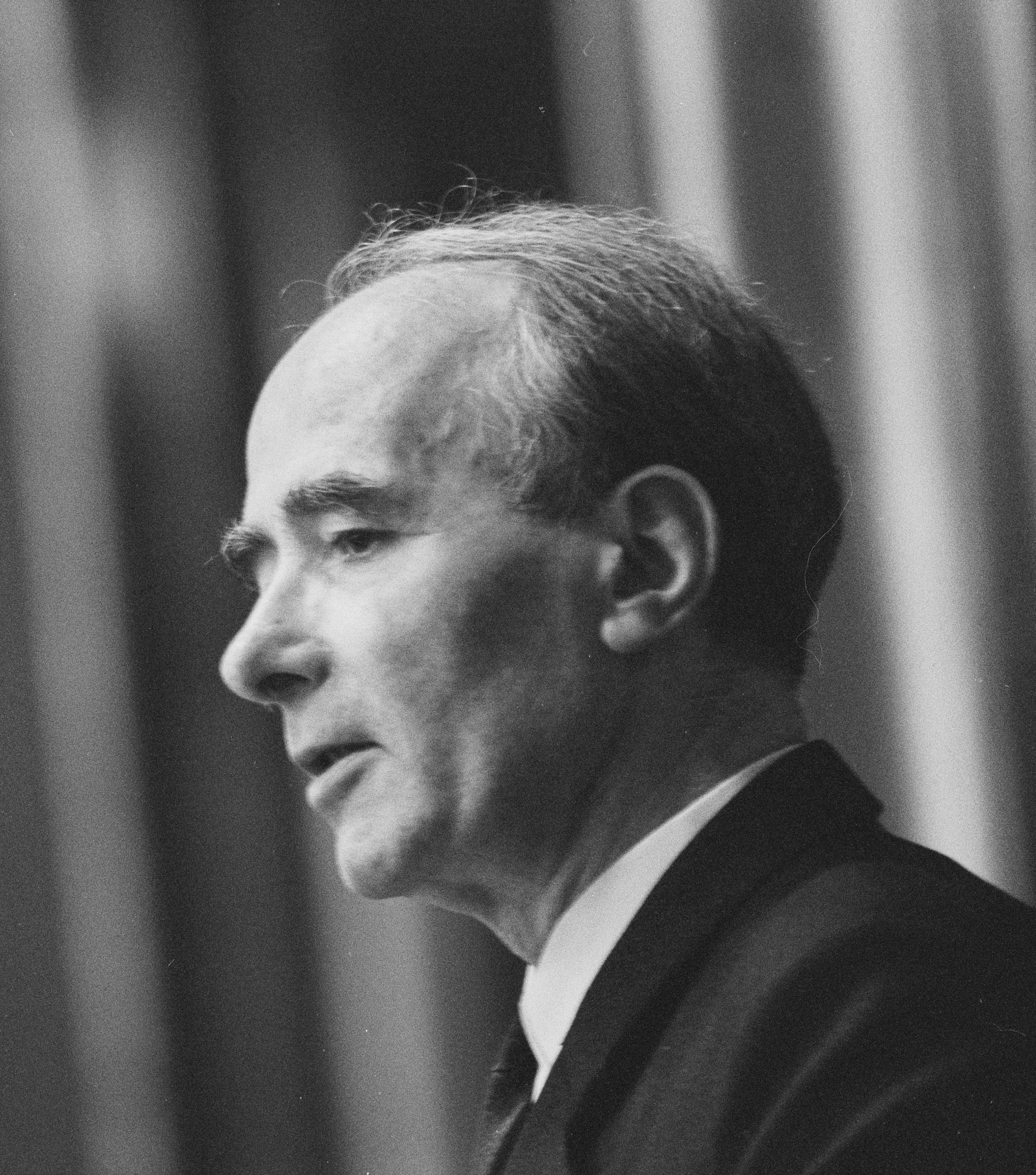

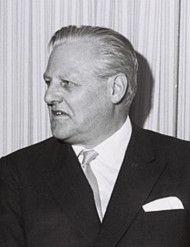

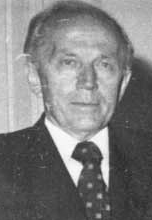

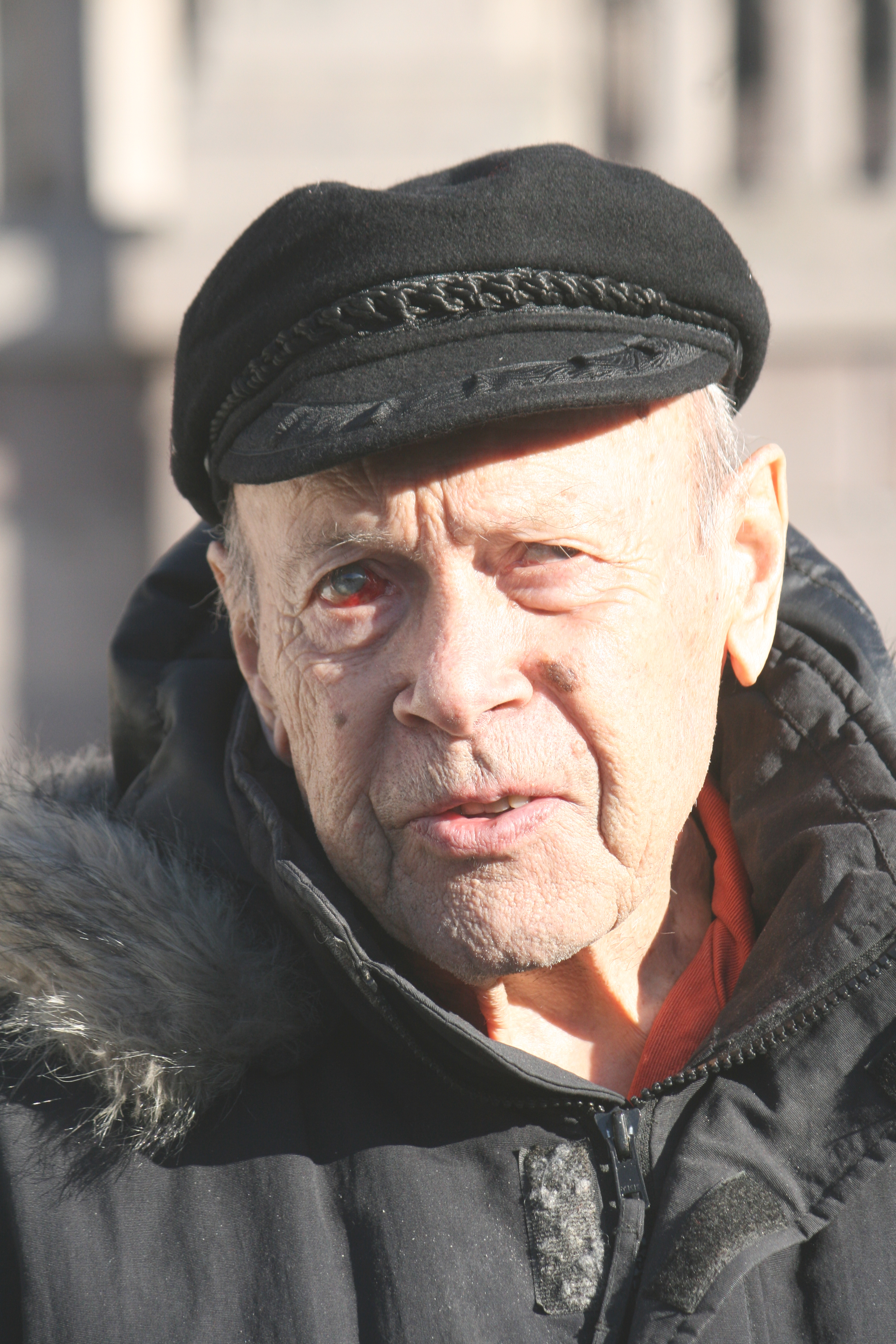
| | First party | Second party | Third party |
|---|---|---|---|
| Leader | Trygve Bratteli | John Lyng | John Austrheim |
| Party | Labour | Conservative | Centre |
| Last election | 43.1%, 68 seats | 21.4%, 31 seats | 10.1%, 18 seats |
| Seats won | 74 | 29 | 20 |
| Seat change | ▲6 | ▼2 | ▲2 |
| Popular vote | 1,004,348 | 489,282^{[a]} | 277,201^{[b]} |
| Percentage | 46.5% | 22.7%^{[a]} | 12.9%^{[b]} |
| | Fourth party | Fifth party |
| Leader | Lars Korvald | Gunnar Garbo |
| Party | Christian; Democratic | Liberal |
| Last election | 8.9%, 13 seats | 9.4%, 18 seats |
| Seats won | 14 | 13 |
| Seat change | ▲1 | ▼5 |
| Popular vote | 252,376^{[a]}^{[b]} | 202,553 |
| Percentage | 11.7%^{[a]}^{[b]} | 9.4% |
- Largest bloc and seats won by constituency
Prime Minister before election
Per Borten
Centre
Prime Minister after election
Per Borten
Centre

Parliamentary elections were held in Norway on 7 and 8 September 1969. Although the Labour Party remained the largest party, winning 74 of the 150 seats, the coalition of right-of-centre parties won 76 seats and retained power. The closeness of the result and fears of the two blocs winning an equal number of seats led to the number of seats being increased to an odd number for the next elections.

== Contesting parties ==
| Name | | Ideology | Position | Leader | 1965 result | |
| Name | | Ideology | Position | Leader | Votes (%) | Seats |
|---|---|---|---|---|---|---|
| Ap | Labour Party; Arbeiderpartiet | Social democracy | Centre-left | Trygve Bratteli | 43.1% | 68 / 150 |
| H | Conservative Party; Høyre | Conservatism | Centre-right | John Lyng | 20.3% | 31 / 150 |
| V | Liberal Party; Venstre | Social liberalism | Centre | Gunnar Garbo | 10.1% | 18 / 150 |
| Sp | Centre Party; Senterpartiet | Agrarianism | Centre | John Austrheim | 9.3% | 18 / 150 |
| KrF | Christian Democratic Party; Kristelig Folkeparti | Christian democracy | Centre to centre-right | Lars Korvald | 7.8% | 13 / 150 |
| SF | Socialist People's Party; Sosialistisk Folkeparti | Socialism | Left-wing to Far-left | Torolv Solheim | 5.9% | 2 / 150 |
| NKP | Communist Party of Norway; Norges Kommunistiske Parti | Communism | Far-left | Reidar T. Larsen | 1.3% | 0 / 155 |

== Campaign ==
=== Slogans ===
| Party | Original slogan | English translation |
|---|---|---|
| Labour Party | "Trygghet i fellesskapet" | "Safety in the community" |
| Conservative Party | "Et samfunn i samarbeide" | "A society working together" |
| Liberal Party | | |
| Centre Party | "Bestem med senterpartiet" | "Decide with the center party" |
| Christian Democratic Party | | |
| Communist Party of Norway | | |

=== Debates ===
1969 Norwegian general election debates
| Date | Time | Organizers | P Present I Invitee N Non-invitee | | | | | | | |
| Date | Time | Organizers | Ap | H | V | Sp | KrF | SF | NKP | Refs |
|---|---|---|---|---|---|---|---|---|---|---|
| 5 September | 19:00-22:00 | NRK | P Trygve Bratteli, Reiulf Steen | P Svenn Stray | P Bent Røiseland | P Per Borten, John Austrheim | P Lars Korvald | P Finn Gustavsen | P Reidar T. Larsen | |

== Results ==
| Party | Votes | % | Seats | +/– |
|---|---|---|---|---|
| Labour Party | 1,004,348 | 46.53 | 74 | +6 |
| Conservative Party | 406,209 | 18.82 | 28 | –2 |
| Liberal Party | 202,553 | 9.38 | 13 | –5 |
| Centre Party | 194,128 | 8.99 | 17 | +2 |
| Christian Democratic Party | 169,303 | 7.84 | 12 | +1 |
| Socialist People's Party | 73,284 | 3.39 | 0 | –2 |
| Communist Party | 21,517 | 1.00 | 0 | 0 |
| Christians–Conservatives (Note: The joint list of the Conservative Party and the Christian Democratic Party won two seats, with the parties taking one each.) | 83,073 | 3.85 | 2 | – |
| Centrists–Christians (Note: The joint list of the Centre Party and the Christian Democratic Party won four seats, three taken by the Centre Party and one by the Christian People's Party.) | 83,073 | 3.85 | 4 | – |
| Socialists–Communists | 3,203 | 0.15 | 0 | – |
| Democratic Party | 561 | 0.03 | 0 | 0 |
| Lapp People's List | 527 | 0.02 | 0 | New |
| Wild votes | 6 | 0.00 | – | – |
| Total | 2,158,712 | 100.00 | 150 | 0 |
| Valid votes | 2,158,712 | 99.82 | | |
| Invalid/blank votes | 3,884 | 0.18 | | |
| Total votes | 2,162,596 | 100.00 | | |
| Registered voters/turnout | 2,579,566 | 83.84 | | |
Source: Nohlen & Stöver

=== Voter demographics ===
| Cohort | Percentage of cohort voting for | | | | | | |
| Cohort | Ap | H | Sp | KrF | V | SF | Others |
|---|---|---|---|---|---|---|---|
| Total vote | 46.5% | 22.7% | 12.9% | 11.7% | 9.4% | 3.39% | |
Gender
| Females | 48.8% | 18.7% | 8.2% | 11.4% | 10% | 2.5% | |
| Males | 48.2% | 20.5% | 10.4% | 5.3% | 9.6% | 4.5% | |
Age
| 18–30 years old | 48.2% | 23.9% | 6.9% | 4.9% | 8.5% | 6.9% | |
| 30-59 years old | 50.2% | 18.5% | 9.9% | 6.4% | 10.8% | 3.2% | |
| 60 years old and older | 44.8% | 19.4% | 10% | 14.8% | 8.5% | 1.5% | |
Work
| low income | 49.8% | 12.5% | 15% | 11.2% | 8% | 2.6% | |
| Average income | 56.7% | 9.7% | 10.1% | 8.5% | 9.7% | 4.3% | |
| High income | 38.1% | 35.9% | 4.9% | 5.9% | 11% | 3.2% | |
Education
| Primary school | 67.2% | 7.4% | 8.3% | 7.4% | 6.2% | 2.4% | |
| High school | 44.7% | 19.3% | 11.8% | 8.8% | 10% | 4.4% | |
| University/college | 15.2% | 50.5% | 3.9% | 7.8% | 18.1% | 3.4% | |
Source: Norwegian Institute for Social Research

=== Seat distribution ===
| Constituency | Total seats | Seats won | | | | |
| Constituency | Total seats | Ap | H | Sp | KrF | V |
|---|---|---|---|---|---|---|
| Akershus | 7 | 3 | 2 | 1 | | 1 |
| Aust-Agder | 4 | 2 | 1 | | | 1 |
| Bergen | 5 | 2 | 1 | | 1 | 1 |
| Buskerud | 7 | 4 | 2 | 1 | | |
| Finnmark | 4 | 3 | 1 | | | |
| Hedmark | 8 | 5 | 1 | 2 | | |
| Hordaland | 10 | 4 | 2 | 1 | 2 | 1 |
| Møre og Romsdal | 10 | 3 | 1 | 2 | 2 | 2 |
| Nord-Trøndelag | 6 | 3 | | 2 | | 1 |
| Nordland | 12 | 6 | 2 | 2 | 1 | 1 |
| Oppland | 7 | 5 | | 2 | | |
| Oslo | 13 | 6 | 5 | | 1 | 1 |
| Østfold | 8 | 5 | 1 | 1 | 1 | |
| Rogaland | 10 | 4 | 2 | 1 | 2 | 1 |
| Sogn og Fjordane | 5 | 2 | 1 | 1 | 1 | |
| Sør-Trøndelag | 10 | 5 | 2 | 2 | 1 | |
| Telemark | 6 | 3 | 1 | | 1 | 1 |
| Troms | 6 | 3 | 1 | 1 | | 1 |
| Vest-Agder | 5 | 2 | 1 | | 1 | 1 |
| Vestfold | 7 | 4 | 2 | 1 | | |
| Total | 150 | 74 | 29 | 20 | 14 | 13 |
Source: Norges Offisielle Statistikk
