= Stortingspresident =

Norwegian political position

President of the Storting
- Stortingspresidenten (Norwegian)

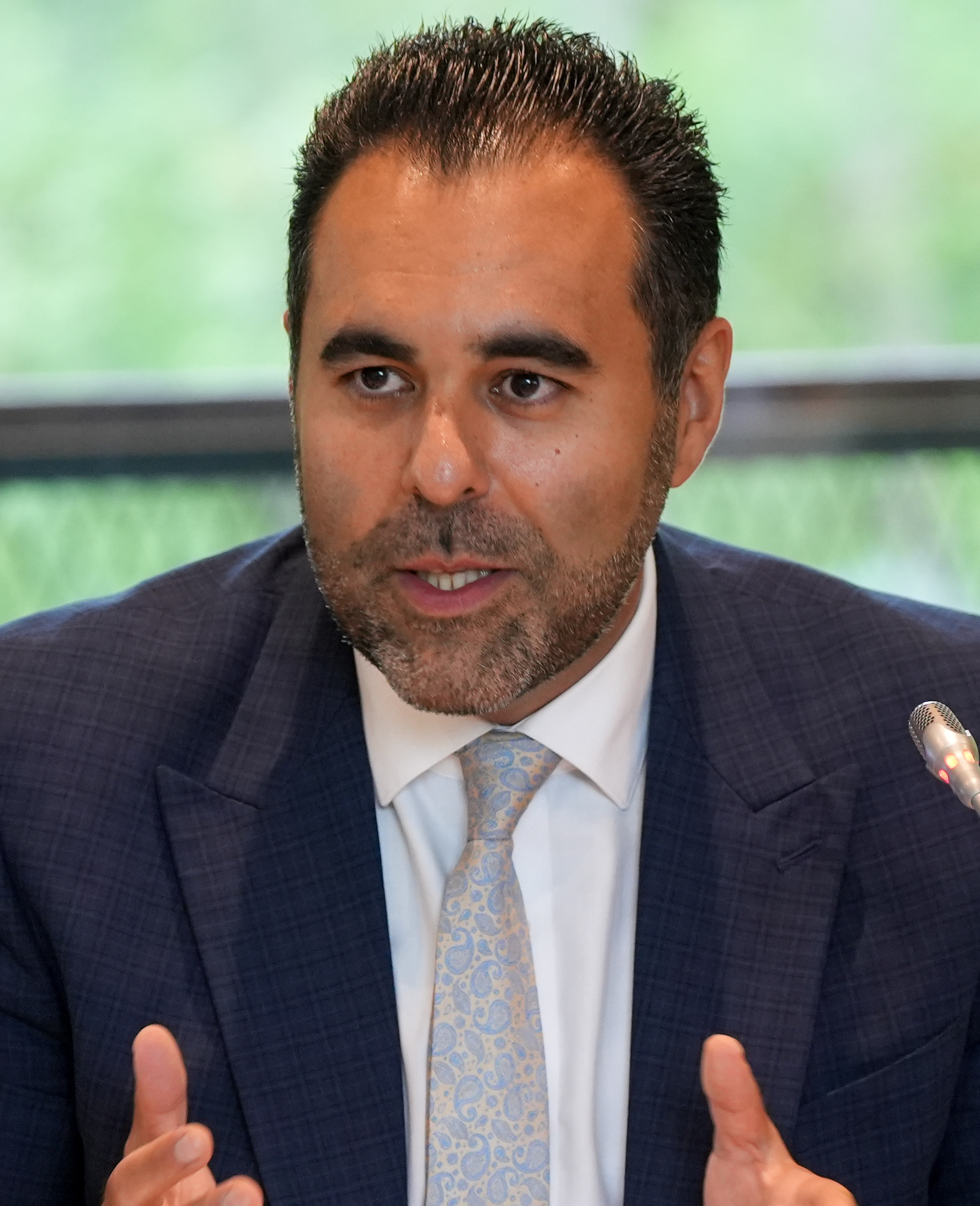
- Incumbent; Masud Gharahkhani since 25 November 2021
- Type: Speaker
- Member of: Storting
- Seat: Oslo
- Appointer: Members of the Storting
- Term length: no limit
- Formation: 1814
- First holder: Various
- Unofficial names: Speaker
- Deputy: Vice President

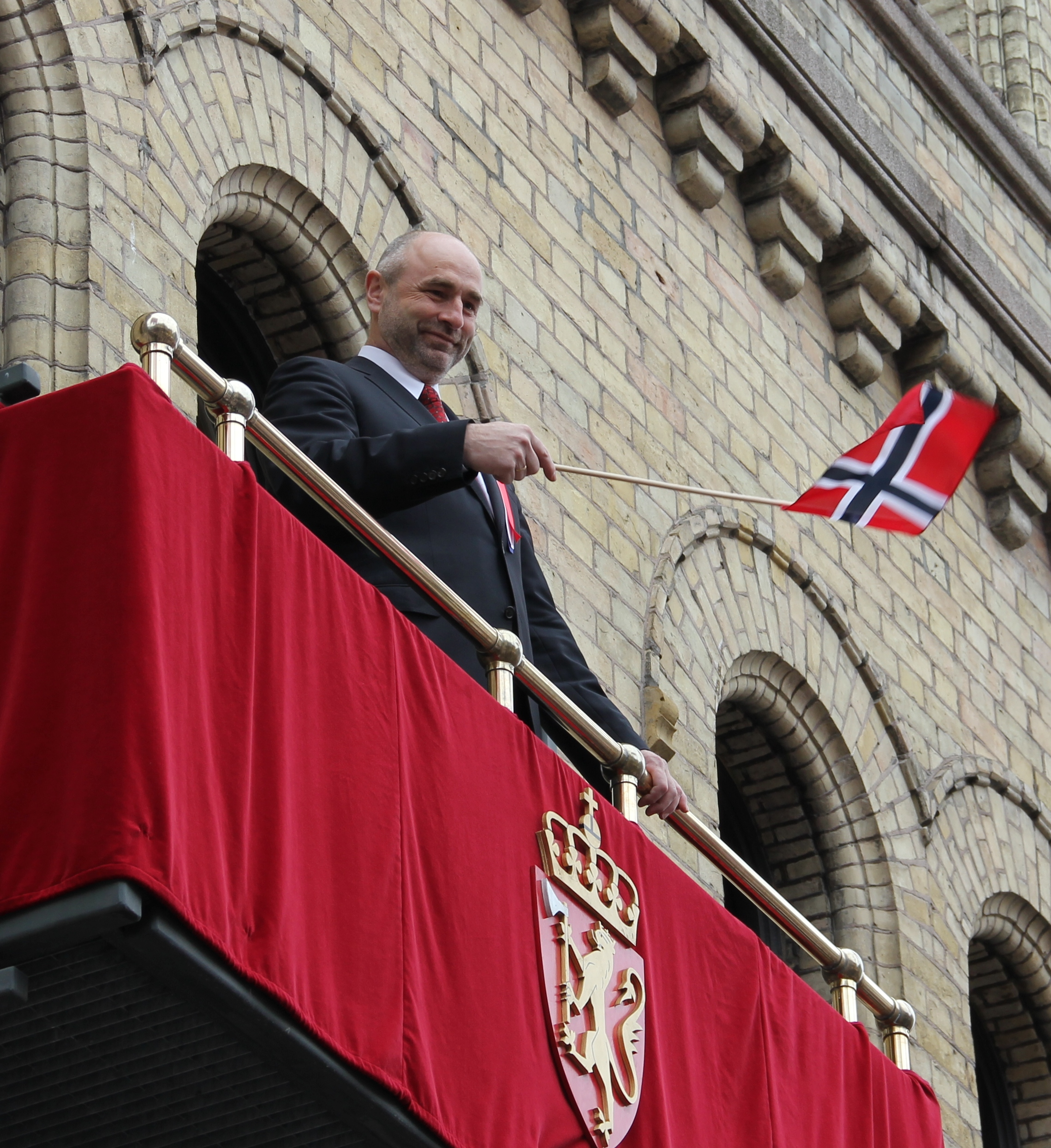
Dag Terje Andersen was the president of the Storting in the 2009–2013 election period. Here he is on the presidential balcony that is installed at the Storting building every 17 Ma . Credit: C. Hill, 2010

The Stortingspresident (lit. 'President of the Storting') is a member of the Storting who is elected to lead the work of the parliament of Norway. The president has five numbered vice presidents which constitute the Storting's Presidency, which prepares the schedule plan, sets the legislative agenda, distributes matters, and chairs parliamentary meetings.

The presidency consists of, from 23 April 2026, the president of the Storting Masud Gharahkhani (Ap), First Vice President Morten Stordalen (FrP), Second Vice President Lise Selnes (Ap), Third Vice President Ove Trellevik (H), Fourth Vice President Alf Erik Andersen (FrP) and Fifth Vice President Ingrid Fiskaa (SV).

The presidency is elected for one year (one Storting) at a time when the Storting convenes in the autumn. However, it is common in recent times for the same people to be elected each of the four years of a Storting term. The presidency normally reflects the relative strength of the parties and is usually elected from among the Storting's most experienced representatives, often in their last term(s). The president of the Storting has no special authority under the Constitution of Norway.

Although the president has full rights as a member of the Storting, the sitting president often does not participate in day-to-day politics. The president is exempt from being a member of any of the Storting's standing committees. According to the Court Attendance Regulations of 1993, the president of the Storting, together with the prime minister of Norway, the chief justice of the Supreme Court of Norway, the deputy president of the Storting and the members of the government, shall attend and have a seat (aisle and seat) after the Norwegian royal family and other royals at official ceremonies and parties at the court.

== The Presidency ==
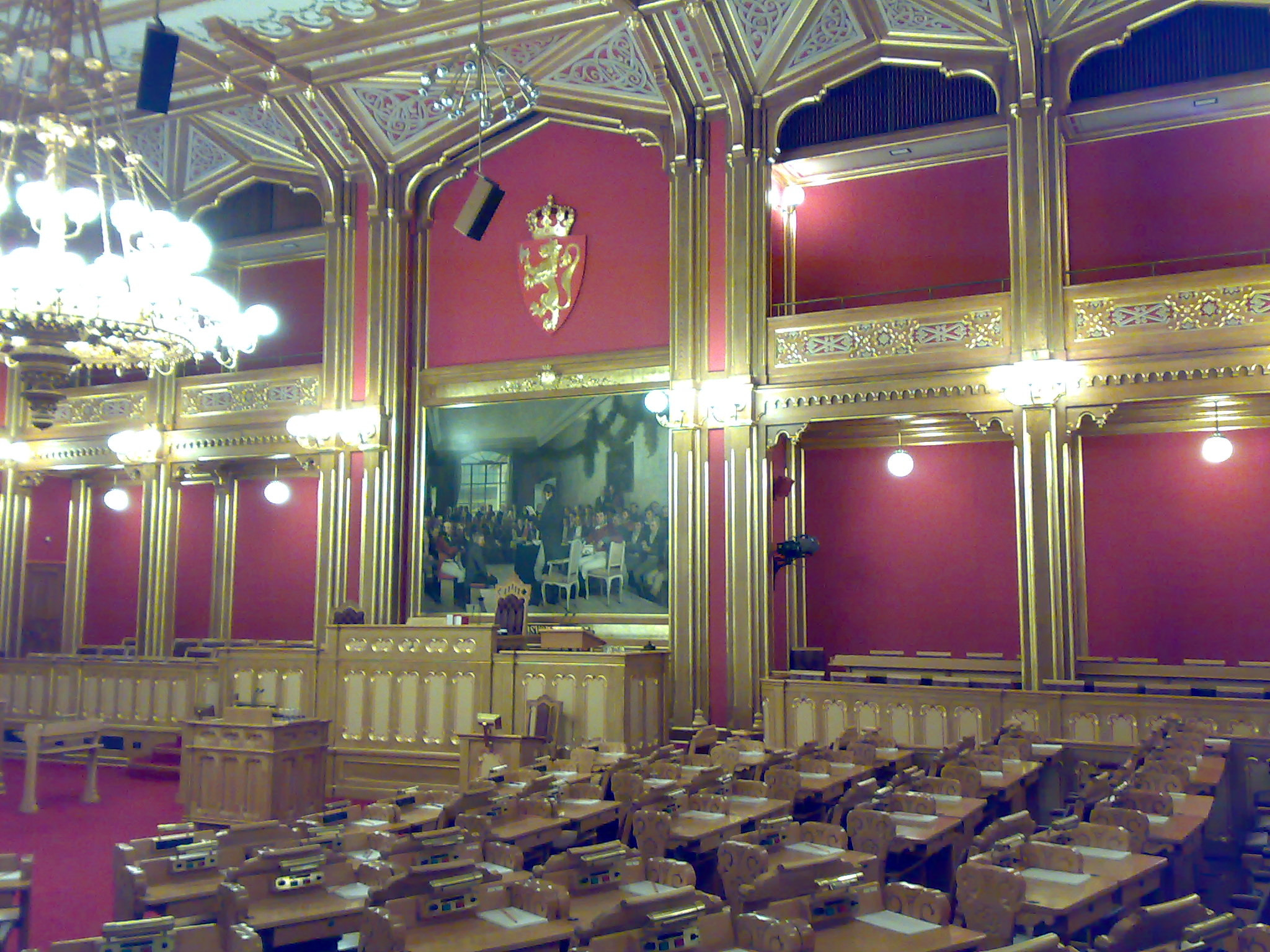
The Stortingshallen is shaped like a semicircle. The president's seat is in the middle, in front of "Eidsvold 1814" , Oscar Wergeland's painting of the Constituent Assembly in 1814.

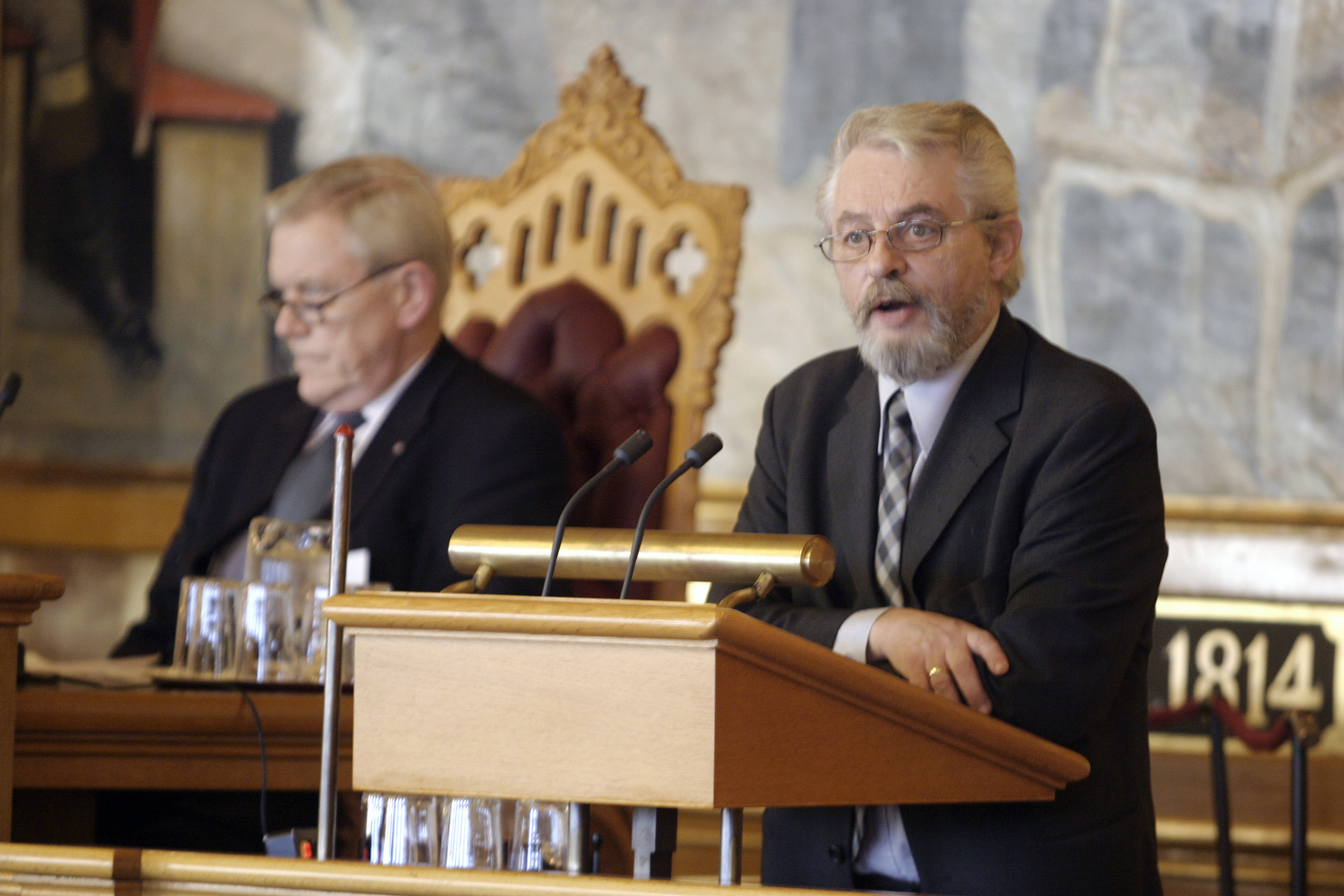
Then-speaker of the Storting Jørgen Kosmo at the Storting's rostrum in 2003. In the background, Vice-president Inge Lønning sits in the presidential seat.

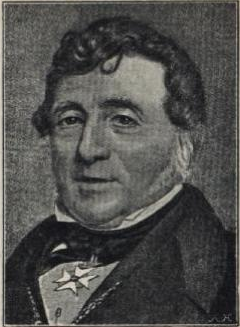
Wilhelm Frimann Koren Christie, as President of the Storting in 1814, led the negotiations with the Swedish commissioners on the terms of the Norwegian-Swedish union.

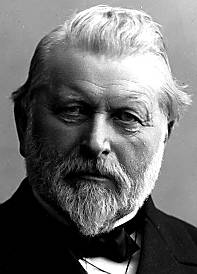
Johannes Steen was President of the Storting from 1880–88 and 1895–97, and prime minister from 1891–93 and 1898–1902.

The presidency of the Storting consists of the president of the Storting and five vice-presidents in numerical order since 2009. The first vice-president is the deputy chairman of the presidency. Until 2009, the presidency consisted of the presidents and vice-presidents of the Storting, the Lagting and the Odelsting.

The presidents are elected under Section 73 of the Constitution. The election is held individually as a majority vote. The president therefore usually comes from the largest party in the Storting, while it is the practice that the rest of the presidency is distributed among the parties so that the composition of the Storting as a whole is represented in the presidency. The elections take place when the Storting is constituted each autumn, but it is convention for the presidents to be re-elected throughout the entire Storting period.

The presidency is almost like a board of directors for the Storting – without the right to make political decisions. It is assisted by the director of the Storting. According to Section 4 of the Storting’s Rules of Procedure, in addition to the six presidents, a secretary and a deputy secretary are also elected, but these do have any significant functions and the positions are perceived as archaic.

Kirsti Kolle Grøndahl was the first female president of the Storting, from 1993 to 2001. In 2018, Tone Wilhelmsen Trøen became the second. In matters considered controversial, whether they concern the operation of the Storting or are political matters, the presidency summons the political party group leaders for consultations. The Storting may also elect a temporary president or acting president from day to day or case to case.

== Duties ==
The Presidency sets the agenda of the Storting. In turn, the presidents chair the Storting's meetings and in this context propose speaking times and voting orders. The presidency also has a responsibility to ensure that the Storting's consideration of matters is carried out in accordance with constitutional rules, both in plenary and in committees. In connection with chairing the meeting, the president also has an unwritten task of ensuring that representatives dress appropriately in the Storting chamber and that they do not use "unparliamentary language". The president presiding over the meeting has a casting vote in the event of a tie during the Storting's votes, but this rarely has any practical political significance.

The president of the Storting (possibly with assistance from the vice-presidents) has several representative duties, both ceremonial and as host to visiting foreign parliamentary delegations. The president of the Storting is exempt from being a member of any of the Storting's standing committees.

In the event of a change of government, the king shall seek advice from the outgoing prime minister on who should be appointed as the new head of government. However, the king may also seek advice from the president of the Storting and, if appropriate, the parliamentary leaders.

== History ==
In the earliest days of the Storting, when the institutions were young, and as long as the king had real political power, the most important task of the Storting president was to maintain contact between the Storting and the king. As a result of this key position, there was both scepticism in the Storting that the Storting president would become too powerful, and fear that the king would “infiltrate the Storting via the presidency”. The solution was first to replace the president every eight days, and from 1821 to elect up to six representatives who would take turns in the presidency.

During the constitutional disputes of the 1870s and 1880s, the Radical majority used to occupy all positions in the presidency, as part of their rivalry with the king. The practice of the largest party in the Storting holding all the seats in the presidency ended in the period 1900–1903, and from 1906 onwards, the positions in the presidency have been distributed proportionally between the parties. After 1945, the presidency has mostly been composed of senior, widely respected representatives. In the interwar period, the parliamentary leaders of the parties often sat in the presidency.

A special event in the history of the Storting is the Elverum Power of Attorney of 10 April 1940, when the Storting met at the Elverum Folk High School. The then president of the Storting, C. J. Hambro, put forward the proposal that gave the government the necessary authority to lead the country "until the time comes when the Government and the Presidency of the Storting, after a conference, convene the Storting for the next ordinary meeting".

The president of the Storting's gavel is made of walnut wood from the estate of George Washington in Virginia, and was put into use in May 1949. It was a gift from the Norwegian-American engineer Thomas Gillebo, who was the son of Ole Torgersen Gillebo, a member of the Storting from Oppland 1903–1906. The gavel bears the following inscription: "To the President of the Norwegian Parliament. God bless the land and people of Norway".

Previously, the president of the Storting had the authority to take "such measures concerning the internal affairs of the Storting as may be necessary" during periods when the Storting is not in session, but this emergency authority has been removed from the Rules of Procedure in force as of 2011.

== List of presidents ==
=== 1814–1884 ===
- Eidsvoll: Georg Sverdrup, Christian Magnus Falsen, Christian Adolph Diriks, Jens Schow Fabricius, Diderich Hegermann, Peder Anker
- 1814: Wilhelm Frimann Koren Christie, Christian Adolph Diriks
- 1815–1816: Wilhelm Frimann Koren Christie
- 1818: Valentin Sibbern, Wilhelm Frimann Koren Christie, Georg Sverdrup
- 1821: Ingelbrecht Knudssøn, Carsten Tank, Christian Magnus Falsen, Andreas Arntzen, Valentin Sibbern
- 1822: Carl Valentin Falsen, Valentin Sibbern
- 1824: Herman Wedel-Jarlsberg, Christian Krohg, Georg Sverdrup, Valentin Sibbern
- 1827: Niels Stockfleth Schultz, Lauritz Weidemann, Herman Wedel-Jarlsberg, Christian Krohg
- 1828: Herman Wedel-Jarlsberg
- 1830: Hans Riddervold, Søren Anton Wilhelm Sørenssen, Niels Arntzen Sem, Herman Wedel-Jarlsberg, Carl Valentin Falsen
- 1833: Søren Anton Wilhelm Sørenssen, Carl Valentin Falsen, Hans Riddervold
- 1836: Hans Riddervold, Søren Anton Wilhelm Sørenssen
- 1836–1837: Johan Henrik Rye, Søren Anton Wilhelm Sørenssen
- 1839: Hans Riddervold, Søren Anton Wilhelm Sørenssen
- 1842: Hans Riddervold, Søren Anton Wilhelm Sørenssen
- 1845: Niels Arntzen Sem, Søren Anton Wilhelm Sørenssen, Carl Valentin Falsen
- 1848: Halvor Christensen, Georg Prahl Harbitz, Hans Riddervold, Carl Valentin Falsen
- 1851: Hans J.C. Aall, Georg Prahl Harbitz
- 1854: Hans J.C. Aall, Georg Prahl Harbitz
- 1857: Ulrik Motzfeldt, Georg Prahl Harbitz
- 1858: Ulrik Motzfeldt, Georg Prahl Harbitz
- 1859–1860: Hans J.C. Aall, Georg Prahl Harbitz
- 1862–1863: Hans J.C. Aall, Georg Prahl Harbitz
- 1864: Georg Prahl Harbitz
- 1865–1866: Niels Vogt, Georg Prahl Harbitz
- 1868–1869: Hans J.C. Aall, Georg Prahl Harbitz
- 1871–1873: Daniel Kildal, Johan Sverdrup
- 1874–1876: Bernhard L. Essendrop, Johan Sverdrup
- 1877–1879: Bernhard L. Essendrop, Johan Sverdrup
- 1880–1882: Johannes Steen, Johan Sverdrup, Bernhard L. Essendrop
- 1882: Johannes Steen

=== 1884–1945 ===
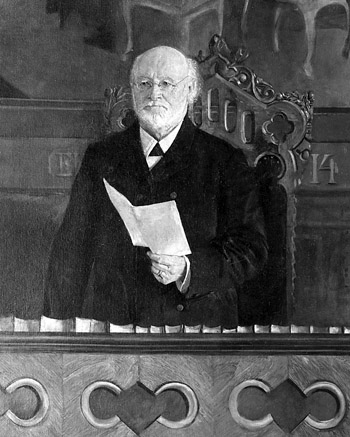
Carl Berner was President of the Storting during the dissolution of the union, here from the presidential seat.

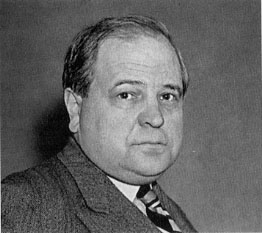
C.J. Hambro was President of the Storting for 20 years, 1925–1945, and was also the architect behind the Elverum Authorization in 1940.

- 1883–1885: Johannes Steen (V), Johan Sverdrup (V)
- 1886–1888: Wollert Konow (SB) (V), Sivert Andreas Nielsen (V), Johannes Steen (V)
- 1889–1891: Thomas Cathinco Bang (H), Sivert Andreas Nielsen (V), Olaus Olsen Eskeland (V), Emil Stang d.e. (H)
- 1892–1894: Viggo Ullmann (V), Sivert A. Nielsen (V)
- 1895–1897: Viggo Ullmann (V), Johannes Steen (V), Sivert A. Nielsen (V)
- 1898–1900: Viggo Ullmann (V), Carl Berner (V), Johannes Steen (V)
- 1900–1903: Edvard Liljedahl (V), Carl Berner (V)
- 1903–1906: Carl Berner (V), Johan Thorne (H), Francis Hagerup (H)
- 1906–1909: Edvard Liljedahl (V), Gunnar Knudsen (V), Carl Berner (V)
- 1910–1912: Magnus Halvorsen (FV), Wollert Konow (SB) (FV), Jens Bratlie (H)
- 1913–1915: Jørgen Løvland (V), Søren Tobias Årstad (V), Gunnar Knudsen (V)
- 1916–1918: Johan Ludwig Mowinckel (V), Ivar P. Tveiten (V), Martin Olsen Nalum (V)
- 1919–1921: Gunnar Knudsen (V), Ivar Lykke (H), Anders Buen (Ap), Ivar P. Tveiten (V), Otto B. Halvorsen (H)
- 1922–1924: Ivar Lykke (H), Otto Bahr Halvorsen (H)
- 1925–1927: C.J. Hambro (H), Gunder Anton Jahren (H), Ivar Lykke (H), John Wolden (V) (til 1926)
- 1928–1933: C.J. Hambro (H)
- 1934–1936: Johan Nygaardsvold (Ap), C.J. Hambro (H)
- 1937–1940: C.J. Hambro (H)
- 1940–1945: in exile in USA/UK: C.J. Hambro (H)

=== Since 1945 ===
- 1945–1949: Fredrik Monsen (Ap), Gustav Natvig-Pedersen (Ap)
- 1950–1954: Gustav Natvig-Pedersen (Ap)
- 1954–1957: Oscar Torp (Ap), Einar Gerhardsen (Ap)
- 1958–1961: Oscar Torp (Ap), Nils Langhelle (Ap)
- 1961–1965: Nils Langhelle (Ap)
- 1965–1969: Bernt Ingvaldsen (H)
- 1969–1973: Bernt Ingvaldsen (H), Leif Granli (Ap)
- 1973–1981: Guttorm Hansen (Ap)
- 1981–1985: Per Hysing-Dahl (H)
- 1985–1993: Jo Benkow (H)
- 1993–2001: Kirsti Kolle Grøndahl (Ap)
- 2001–2005: Jørgen Kosmo (Ap)
- 2005–2009: Thorbjørn Jagland (Ap)
- 2009–2013: Dag Terje Andersen (Ap)
- 2013–2018: Olemic Thommessen (H)
- 2018–2021: Tone W. Trøen (H)
- 2021–2021: Eva Kristin Hansen (Ap)
- 2021–Present: Masud Gharahkhani (Ap)

== See also ==
- List of Vice Presidents of the Storting
- List of presidents of the Odelsting
- List of presidents of the Lagting
- Secretaries of the Storting

== Literature ==
- Bjørnstad, Karl. "Presidenter i Stortinget, Odelstinget og Lagtinget 1814–1964". In Hambro, C.J., Worm-Müller, Jacob S., Bjørnstad, Karl og Steen, Sverre (ed.). Det Norske Storting gjennom 150 år. Vol. 4. Oslo: I kommisjon hos Gyldendal. p. 507–564.
