= Svenn Stray =

Norwegian politician (1922–2012)

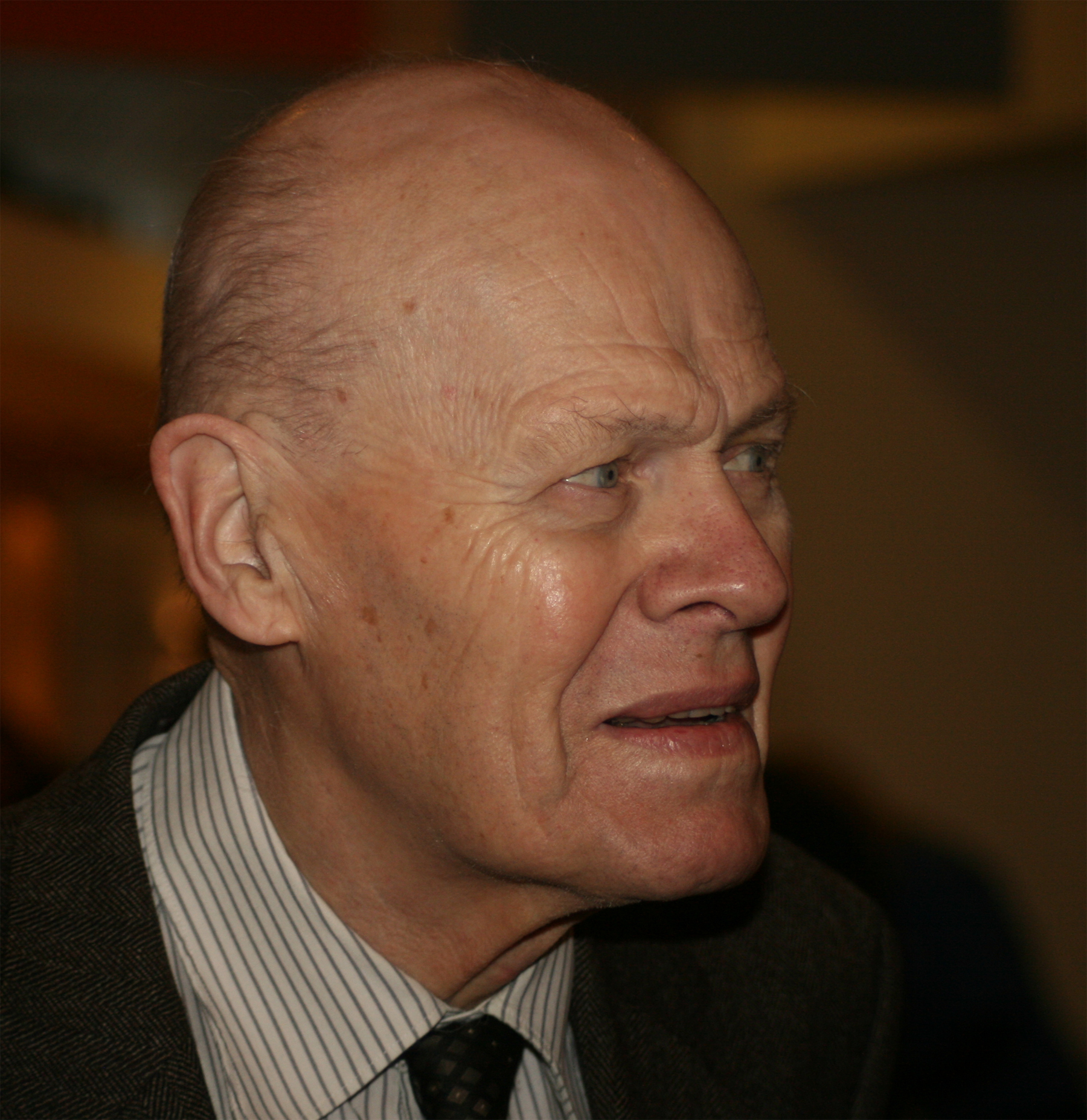
- Stray in 2009

Minister of Foreign Affairs
- In office 14 October 1981 – 9 May 1986
- Prime Minister: Kåre Willoch
- Preceded by: Knut Frydenlund
- Succeeded by: Knut Frydenlund
- In office 22 May 1970 – 17 March 1971
- Prime Minister: Per Borten
- Preceded by: John Lyng
- Succeeded by: Andreas Cappelen

Parliamentary Leader of the Conservative Party
- In office 1 October 1965 – 22 May 1970
- Leader: Sjur Lindebrække
- Preceded by: John Lyng
- Succeeded by: Kåre Willoch

First Deputy Leader of the Conservative Party
- In office 1962 – 12 May 1970
- Leader: Sjur Lindebrække
- Preceded by: Bernt Ingvaldsen
- Succeeded by: Erling Norvik

Member of the Norwegian Parliament
- In office 1 January 1958 – 30 September 1985
- Constituency: Østfold

Vice President of the Storting
- In office 9 October 1973 – 30 September 1981
- President: Guttorm Hansen
- Preceded by: Bernt Ingvaldsen
- Succeeded by: Odvar Nordli

Personal details
- Born: Svenn Thorkild Stray; 11 February 1922 Arendal, Norway
- Died: 20 May 2012 (aged 90) Moss, Norway
- Party: Conservative

Svenn Thorkild Stray (11 February 1922 – 20 May 2012) was a Norwegian politician and a member of the Conservative Party of Norway. He served as a member of parliament from 1958 to 1985, as president of the Nordic Council in 1968, and as foreign minister of Norway from 1970 to 1971, and 1981 to 1986.

== Background ==
He was born in Arendal. Stray's parents were Gudmund Stray (1885–1970), a dentist, and Anne Johanne Marie Frøstrup (1893–1975). Svenn Stray graduated from the University of Oslo with a law degree in 1946. After having served as a clerk in Moss, Norway, he opened his own practice in Moss in 1950.

== Political career ==
Stray was first elected to local office in Moss in 1955, and he remained active in local politics until 1979. He was elected to Stortinget in 1958. He served continuously in the parliament until 1985, for a total of 27 years, 264 days.

Stray was foreign minister twice, from 1970 to 1971, and 1981 to 1986. He died on 20 May 2012 at the age of 90.

Political offices
Preceded by Knut Frydenlund	Minister of Foreign Affairs; 1981–1986	Succeeded by Knut Frydenlund
Preceded by John Lyng	Minister of Foreign Affairs; 1970–1971	Succeeded by Andreas Zeier Cappelen
