= Flight 139 =

Flight 139 may refer to:

- Air France Flight 139, hijacked on 27 June 1976
- Braathens SAFE Flight 139, hijacked on 21 June 1985
- Sudan Airways Flight 139, crashed on 8 July 2003
