= Guttorm Hansen =

Norwegian writer and politician (1920–2009)

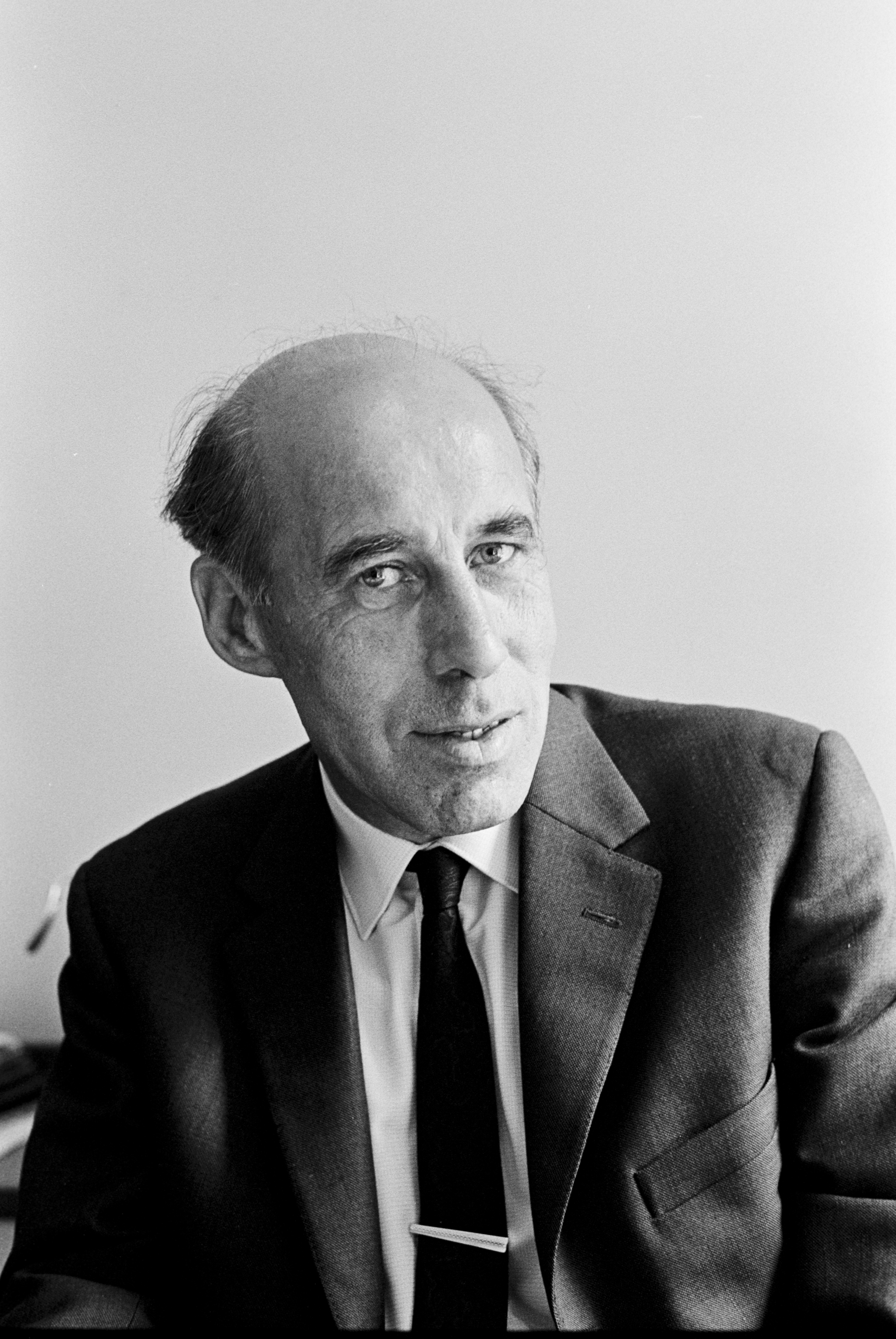

President of the Storting
- In office 9 October 1973 – 30 September 1981
- Monarch: Olav V
- Prime Minister: Lars Korvald; Trygve Bratteli; Odvar Nordli; Gro Harlem Brundtland
- Vice President: Svenn Stray
- Preceded by: Leif Granli
- Succeeded by: Per Hysing-Dahl

Member of the Norwegian Parliament
- In office 1 October 1961 – 30 September 1985
- Constituency: Nord-Trøndelag

Personal details
- Born: 3 November 1920 Namsos, Nord-Trøndelag, Norway
- Died: 2 April 2009 (aged 88)
- Party: Labour
- Occupation: Politician

Guttorm Hansen (3 November 1920 – 2 April 2009) was a Norwegian writer and politician for the Labour Party. He started his career as a mechanic, but after 1945 he was a journalist and editor of magazines and newspapers. Via local politics in his native Namsos he was elected to the Norwegian Parliament in 1961, serving six terms in total. He was the President of the Storting for two of these terms, from 1973 to 1981. He was also known as a prolific book writer, many of his books having a direct connection to his political life.

== Career ==
He was born in Namsos as the son of mechanic Håkon Hansen (1895–1963) and housewife Agnes Selnes (1900–1924). Before 1945 he worked as a mechanic himself, and since he only had primary education, he took extra education in the evenings. From 1945 to 1948 he worked as a journalist and subeditor in the temperance magazine Menneskevennen. He then worked as editor-in-chief of Firdaposten from 1948 to 1951 and as a journalist in Namdal Arbeiderblad from 1951 to 1961.

Hansen's mother died from tuberculosis, and due to his social background and environment it was no surprise that he joined the labour movement. He started his party political career in the Workers' Youth League, and sat in its central committee as secretary from 1947 to 1948. He was a member of the municipal council of Namsos Municipality from 1955 to 1963, and served as a deputy representative to the Norwegian Parliament from Nord-Trøndelag during the term 1958–1961. During the same period he chaired the party chapter in Namdalen. In 1961 he was elected for his first proper term in the Norwegian Parliament. He would be re-elected on five occasions, his last term ending in 1985. When the first cabinet Bratteli held office between 1971 and 1972, Hansen became leader of the Labour Party parliamentary council. From 1973 to 1981 he served as President of the Storting. Also, he was asked three times to become a government minister, but declined. He was regarded by himself and others as a legislator first and foremost, and in 1985 the newspaper Dagbladet labelled him "the last Eidsvoll man".

From 1981 to 1985 he took up his work from after 1945, as chair of the informal parliamentary temperance group. He was also a member of several public boards and committees, chairing Statens naturvernråd from 1963 to 1965 and the board of Direktoratet for vilt og ferskvannsfisk from 1977 to 1980. From 1985 to 1992 he was a member of the Arts Council Norway, and from 1981 to 1983 he was a member of the presidium of the Nordic Council. He chaired the board of Fosdalen Bergverk from 1975 to 1977, and was a member of the board of DNO, Det Norske Luftfartsselskap from 1974 to 1977 and Aschehoug from 1977 to 1985.

Hansen was a supporter of NATO and the European Community, chairing the Norwegian Atlantic Committee from 1966 to 1985 and being a board member of the European Movement in Norway from 1971 to 1975. He wrote several books, mostly debate books on foreign policy and security policy. He also published several memoirs about his time in politics and the Parliament: Der er det godt å sitte (1984), Fra min plass. Politiske erindringer 1970-1985 (1986), Trehesten, partiet og gutten (1987) and Etterkrigstid. Politiske erindringer fra 1945 til 1990 (1990). Books like these sold well, but are also cited by scholars. His book Om Stortingets arbeidsordning, co-written with Parliament secretary Erik Mo and released in 1994, is also often referenced.

Hansen was married to Karin Johanne Johnsen since December 1947. He died in Namsos in April 2009.

== Selected works ==
- Tunsjøguden. 1943.
- Fjellets lasso rundt mitt hjerte. Om vandringer, dyr og folk i Børgefjell og andre namdalske fjelltrakter. 1979.
- Der er det godt å sitte. Hverdag på Løvebakken gjennom hundre års parlamentarisme. 1980.
- Naturvern i Norge, NOU 1980:23. 1980.
- Arti å hør det læll ... Trønderhumor i flere variasjoner. 1982.
- Fra min plass. Politiske erindringer 1970–1985. 1986.
- Trehesten, partiet og gutten. Bilder fra en barndom. 1987.
- Etterkrigstid. Politiske erindringer fra 1945 til 1990. 1990.
- Mitt Trøndelag. 1991.
- Å sånt ska styr bygda. 1992.
- Vi bygger en by. 100 år med Namsos arbeiderparti. 1998.

Political offices
Preceded by Leif Granli	President of the Storting; 1973–1981	Succeeded by Per Hysing-Dahl
