= Granli =

Granli is a surname. Notable people with the surname include:

- Daniel Granli (born 1994), Norwegian footballer
- Leif Granli (1909–1988), Norwegian politician
