= Røiseland =

Røiseland is a Norwegian surname. Notable people with the surname include:

- Bent Røiseland (1902–1981), Norwegian politician
- Marte Olsbu Røiseland (born 1990), Norwegian biathlete
