= Ivar Moe =

Norwegian politician (1922–2014)

Ivar Moe (7 April 1922 – 23 January 2014) was a Norwegian lawyer and politician for the Conservative Party.

He was born Hemne Municipality as a daughter of farmer and manager John Moe (1884–1963) and housewife Elen Sødal (1885–1966). She finished his secondary education in 1944 and graduated with the cand.jur. degree in 1950. He was decorated with the Defence Medal 1940–1945 for resistance work during the German occupation of Norway.

He worked in Oslo Sparebank in 1950 and in Tollkonsulent Arnold Andreassen from 1951 to 1959. From 1959 to his retirement in 2002 he ran his own law firm. He was an elected member of Oslo city council from 1959 to 1963. He was a board member (1958–1961, 1968–1972) and supervisory council member (1954–1977) of Oslo Conservative Party, and chaired Grefsen Conservative Party from 1954 to 1958.

He was elected as a deputy representative to the Parliament of Norway from Oslo in 1961, 1965, 1969 and 1973. From August to September 1963 he served as a regular representative, covering for Kåre Willoch who was a member of Lyng's Cabinet. From 1970 to 1992 he served in the Office of the Auditor General of Norway.

He chaired the association of Trøndelag people in Oslo, Trønderlaget, from 1946 to 1949, and By- og bygdelagsforbundet from 1957 to 1960. He chaired the sports club Akademisk BK from 1952 to 1959 and became an honorary member. Moe chaired Oslo og Follo Busstrafikk from 1988 to 1997, Øvre Romerike Billag from 1988 to 1995 and Halden Trafikk from 1988 to 1993; was a board member of Stor-Oslo Lokaltrafikk from 1975 to 1988, and was a member of local transport committees around 1970.
