= Bernt Ingvaldsen =

Norwegian politician (1902–1985)

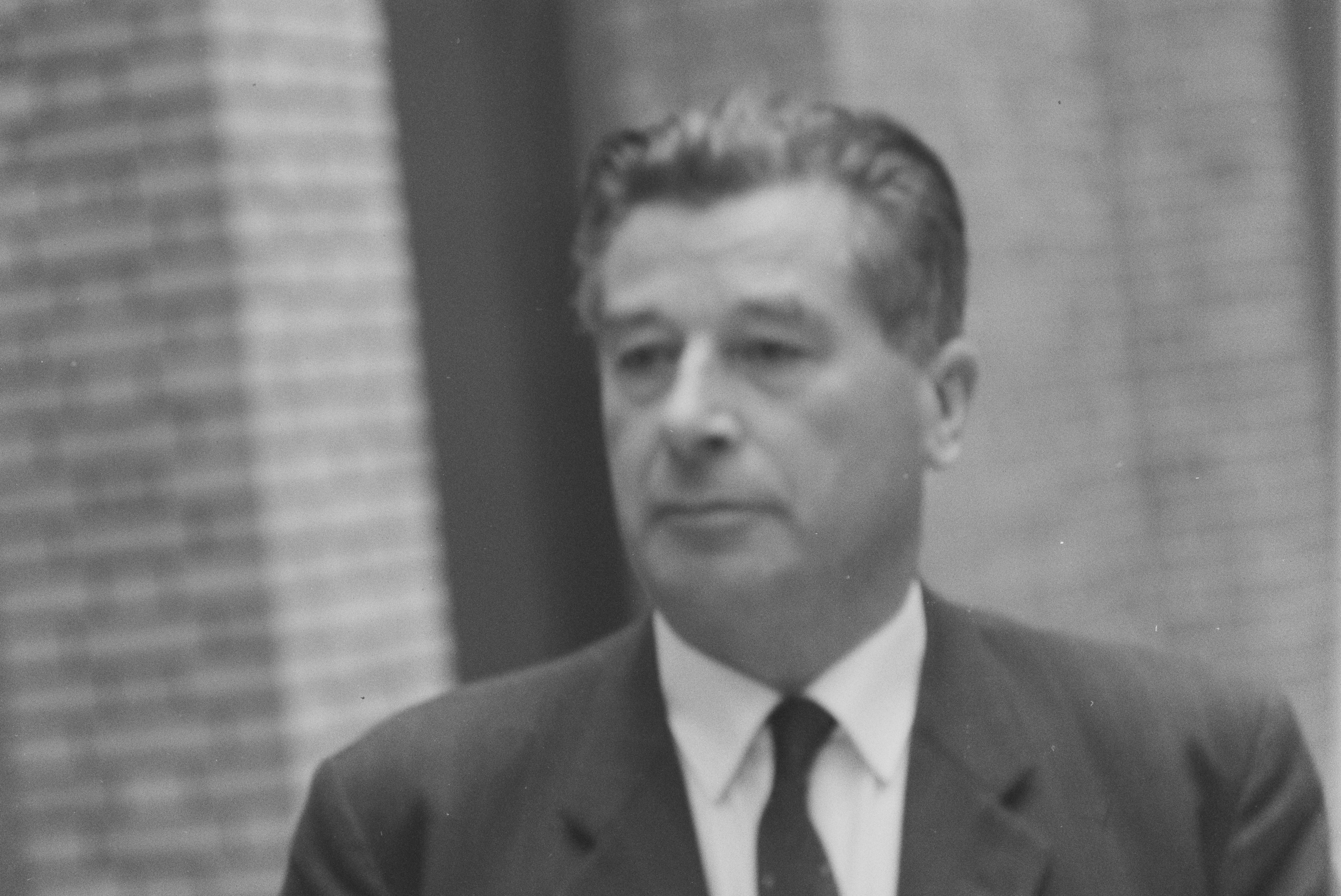
- Ingvaldsen in 1963

President of the Storting
- In office 8 October 1965 – 1 October 1972
- Monarch: Olav V
- Prime Minister: Einar Gerhardsen; Per Borten; Trygve Bratteli
- Vice President: Nils Langhelle; Leif Granli
- Preceded by: Nils Langhelle
- Succeeded by: Leif Granli

Vice President of the Storting
- In office 2 October 1972 – 30 September 1973
- President: Leif Granli
- Preceded by: Leif Granli
- Succeeded by: Svenn Stray

Chairman of the Norwegian Nobel Committee
- In office 28 August 1967 – 31 December 1967
- Preceded by: Nils Langhelle
- Succeeded by: Aase Lionæs

Member of the Norwegian Parliament
- In office 1 January 1953 – 30 September 1973
- Constituency: Buskerud
- In office 4 December 1945 – 31 December 1952
- Constituency: Drammen, Hønefoss and Kongsberg

Personal details
- Born: 12 October 1902 Trondheim, Sør-Trøndelag, Norway
- Died: 24 April 1985 (aged 82) Drammen, Buskerud, Norway
- Party: Conservative

Bernt Ingvaldsen (12 October 1902 – 24 April 1985) was a Norwegian politician for the Conservative Party.

He was born in Trondheim.

He was elected to the Norwegian Parliament from the Market towns of Buskerud county in 1950, and was re-elected on six occasions. He was President of the Storting from 1965 to 1972, and from 1972 to 1973 he was vice president.

On the local level Ingvaldsen was a member of Drammen city council from 1945 to 1959.

He was a member of the Norwegian Nobel Committee from 1967 to 1970, and served as vice chairman of it from 1970 to 1975. Together with Sjur Lindebrække he worked to undermine Hélder Câmara as a candidate, cooperating with the Brazilian ambassador in Oslo as the military dictatorship in Brazil was vehemently against Câmara receiving the Nobel peace prize.

Preceded by Nils Langhelle	President of the Storting; 1965–1972	Succeeded by Leif Granli
