= Bjørn Benkow =

Norwegian journalist

Bjørn Leo Benkow (13 February 1940 – 17 February 2010) was a Norwegian journalist who became infamous for faking interviews with celebrities. Among the persons Benkow claimed to have interviewed were Bill Gates, Michael Schumacher, Oprah Winfrey and Margaret Thatcher, all of whom denied that the interviews had taken place. Benkow claimed that he interviewed Michael Schumacher in his home in Switzerland and Bill Gates on a plane to Munich, among other things. In reality, he fabricated the interviews in his own home. He sold his fabricated interviews to several Scandinavian newspapers.

Suspicion he had fabricated an interview with Margaret Thatcher arose in 1992, with Thatcher denying that the alleged interview had taken place. In the summer of 2006, it was revealed that Benkow had fabricated several additional interviews. After spokespersons for several of the celebrities had denied that such interviews took place, Benkow admitted to having fabricated the interviews.

His uncle was the politician Jo Benkow.
