= Leif Granli =

Norwegian politician

President of the Storting
- In office 2 October 1972 – 30 September 1973
- Monarch: Olav V
- Prime Minister: Trygve Bratteli; Lars Korvald
- Vice President: Bernt Ingvaldsen
- Preceded by: Bernt Ingvaldsen
- Succeeded by: Guttorm Hansen

Vice President of the Storting
- In office 2 October 1967 – 1 October 1972
- President: Bernt Ingvaldsen
- Preceded by: Nils Langhelle
- Succeeded by: Bernt Ingvaldsen

Minister of Agriculture
- In office 25 September 1963 – 12 October 1965
- Prime Minister: Einar Gerhardsen
- Preceded by: Hans Borgen
- Succeeded by: Bjarne Lyngstad

Personal details
- Born: 25 September 1909 Hegra Municipality, Nordre Trondheim, Norway
- Died: 17 March 1988 (aged 78)
- Party: Labour

Leif Granli (born 25 September 1909 in Hegra Municipality, died 17 March 1988) was a Norwegian politician for the Labour Party.

He was elected to the Norwegian Parliament from Nord-Trøndelag in 1945, and was re-elected on six occasions. From 1963 to 1965, while the fourth cabinet Gerhardsen held office, Granli was appointed Minister of Agriculture. During this period his seat in parliament was taken by Hans Mikal Solsem. Granli was later Vice President of the Storting from 1967 to 1972, and from 2 October 1972 to 30 September 1973 he was President of the Storting.

On the local level he was a member of the executive committee of the municipal council for Frol Municipality from 1933 to 1949, except for the years 1940–1945 during the German occupation of Norway, and later a member of the municipal council of Levanger Municipality from 1959 to 1967. His political career ended with the position of County Governor of Nord-Trøndelag, which he held from 1971 to 1979.

Outside politics, he worked as a journalist in Arbeider-Avisen from 1937 to 1940, and was editor-in-chief of Hardanger Folkeblad from 1940 to 1941. From 1935 to 1940 he also worked as a farmer; he had no formal qualifications in the field of agriculture prior to becoming Minister of Agriculture.

Political offices
Preceded by Hans Borgen	Norwegian Minister of Agriculture; 1963–1965	Succeeded by Bjarne Lyngstad
Preceded by Bernt Ingvaldsen	President of the Storting; 1972–1973	Succeeded by Guttorm Hansen
Preceded by Ole Bae	County Governor of Nord-Trøndelag; 1971–1979	Succeeded by Ola H. Kveli
