= Per Hysing-Dahl =

Norwegian politician

- Born: 31 July 1920; Bergen, Norway
- Died: 7 April 1989 (aged 68)
- Military career
- Service years: 1941–1946
- Rank: Captain
- Units: Norwegian resistance movement No. 161 Squadron RAF
Awards
(Norway)	War Cross with sword
(Norway)	Commander of the Royal Norwegian Order of St. Olav
(Norway)	St. Olav's medal with Oak branch
(Norway)	Defence Medal
(United Kingdom)	Distinguished Flying Cross and bar
(France)	Croix de guerre
(France)	Commander of the Legion of Honour
- Other work: Industry manager, politician, President of the Storting

Per Hysing-Dahl

President of the Storting
- In office 8 October 1981 – 30 September 1985
- Prime Minister: Gro Harlem Brundtland; Kåre Willoch
- Vice President: Odvar Nordli
- Preceded by: Guttorm Hansen
- Succeeded by: Jo Benkow

Per Hysing-Dahl, DFC & Bar (born 31 July 1920 in Bergen, died 7 April 1989) was a Norwegian resistance member, pilot, industry manager and politician for the Conservative Party.

He was elected to the Norwegian Parliament from Hordaland in 1969, and was re-elected on three occasions. During the term 8 October 1981–30 September 1985 he was President of the Storting.

On the local level he was a member of Fana municipality council from 1959 to 1967. He chaired the county party chapter from 1971 to 1972.

== War effort ==
Hysing-Dahl left Norway aboard the MK "Soløy" on 2 August 1941 and arrived at Baltasund in Shetland on 4 August. In Great Britain he joined the air force. After flying school at Little Norway in Canada, Hysing-Dahl was sent to one of the RAF's training squadrons in Bomber Command, 10 OTU (Operational Training Unit), before being ordered to 161 Squadron RAF, stationed at Tempsford.

The squadron was split in two; A-flight operated with Westland Lysander and Lockheed Hudson, landing and picking up agents of the SOE in German-occupied Europe.

B-flight flew Handley Page Halifax bombers converted for drop operations, and engaged in dropping agents and supplies to resistance groups.

Hysing-Dahl's first tour of duty of 30 sorties was with the Halifax aircraft in B-flight, and ended in January 1944. Normally one was sent to rest after a period ended, but Hysing-Dahl immediately began a new round, this time in A -the flight with the Lysander planes.

In July 1944, Hysing-Dahl was to fly three French agents to a landing site in the Loire. The standard procedure was that someone at the landing site, which was usually a small field, just before landing should fire flares so the pilot had an idea of where to go down. But that didn't happen, so Hysing-Dahl turned back towards England. On the way home, the plane was hit by shell fire. Shrapnel cut the oil line, so the engine cut across the English Channel. As the agents did not have parachutes, Hysing-Dahl had to try to land the plane on the lake. He managed to avoid the plane tipping over, so he and the three passengers were able to get out. An air bottle to inflate the life raft Hysing-Dahl had in the parachute pack did not work. Before Hysing-Dahl had inflated the raft, one of the French sank. He got the remaining two aboard the raft, which was actually designed for one person. Only in the morning the following day were they discovered and rescued by a patrol boat from the U.S. Navy.

After a period of rest, during which he flew de Havilland Mosquito and Bristol Beaufighter aircraft from factories in England to RAF units in Egypt for Ferry Command, in March 1945 Hysing-Dahl was back with 161 Squadron and B-flight. There, the Halifax planes had been replaced by the Short Stirling. The war was almost over, and the squadron concentrated on releases to the resistance movement in Denmark and Norway. After the capitulation, Hysing-Dahl was ordered to Trondheim, where he was to assist Colonel Odd Bull. Hysing-Dahl discharged as captain in the summer of 1946.

Political offices
Preceded by Guttorm Hansen	President of the Storting; 1981–1985	Succeeded by Jo Benkow
