= Jo Benkow =

Norwegian politician and writer

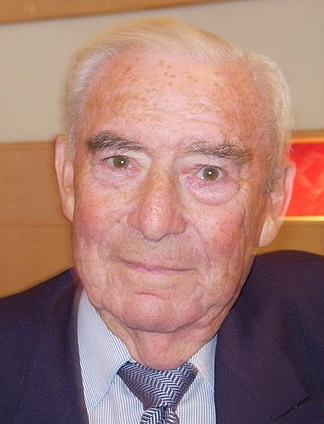

President of the Storting
- In office 9 October 1985 – 30 September 1993
- Monarchs: Olav V Harald V
- Prime Minister: Kåre Willoch; Gro Harlem Brundtland; Jan P. Syse
- Vice President: Reiulf Steen; Kirsti Kolle Grøndahl
- Preceded by: Per Hysing-Dahl
- Succeeded by: Kirsti Kolle Grøndahl

Conservative Parliamentary leader
- In office 1 October 1981 – 30 September 1985
- Prime Minister: Kåre Willoch
- Leader: Himself; Erling Norvik
- Preceded by: Kåre Willoch
- Succeeded by: Jan P. Syse

Leader of the Conservative Party
- In office 4 May 1980 – 25 August 1984
- First Deputy: Håkon Randal
- Second Deputy: Astrid Gjertsen; Kaci Kullmann Five
- Preceded by: Erling Norvik
- Succeeded by: Erling Norvik

First Deputy Leader of the Conservative Party
- In office 16 April 1978 – 4 May 1980
- Leader: Erling Norvik
- Preceded by: Lars T. Platou
- Succeeded by: Håkon Randal

Second Deputy Leader of the Conservative Party
- In office 12 May 1974 – 16 April 1978
- Leader: Erling Norvik
- Preceded by: Per Hysing-Dahl
- Succeeded by: Astrid Gjertsen

Member of the Norwegian Parliament
- In office 1 October 1965 – 30 September 1993
- Constituency: Akershus

Personal details
- Born: Josef Elias Benkowitz; 15 August 1924 Trondheim, Sør-Trøndelag, Norway
- Died: 18 May 2013 (aged 88) Oslo, Norway
- Party: Conservative
- Spouse: Annelise Høegh
- Occupation: Politician
- Profession: photographer

Military service
- Allegiance: Norway
- Branch/service: Air Force

Jo Benkow (born Josef Elias Benkowitz; 15 August 1924 – 18 May 2013) was a Norwegian politician and writer, notable for being an important person in the Conservative Party of Norway, and President of the Parliament 1985–1993. He was also President of the Nordic Council in 1983.

== Private life ==
Jo Benkow was born in Trondheim, Norway, to Jewish parents, Ivan Benkow and Annie Louise Florence. The family moved to the municipality of Bærum outside Oslo when Jo was a child. Jo Benkow married Bjørg Gerda Folkestad in 1952, but the marriage dissolved in 1983. From 1985 he was married to fellow politician Annelise Høegh, former parliamentary representative for the Conservative Party, and daughter of war aviator Anders Høegh. He was the uncle of journalistic fraudster Bjørn Benkow.

As a member of the tiny Jewish minority of Norway, he experienced first-hand prejudice while growing up. In 1942, he fled persecution by the Nazis occupying Norway, to Sweden. His mother and sister were deported by the Nazi regime from Norway and murdered in Auschwitz. Jo reached the United Kingdom where he served in the Royal Norwegian Air Force. He returned after the war and took up photography as a trade, his father's profession.

== Political career ==
In 1965 he was elected to the Parliament of Norway, representing the Conservative Party. In parliament he soon became a leading figure, as party leader 1980–84, group leader of the Conservative Party in parliament 1981–85 and most notably becoming President of the Storting (Speaker) on 9 October 1985, a position he held until his retirement on 30 September 1993, after 28 years in parliament.

Benkow served as president of the International Helsinki Federation for Human Rights, taught international relations at Boston University, and has written books on human rights, modern monarchy in Norway, and other issues. His autobiography Fra Synagogen til Løvebakken (From the synagogue to Løvebakken; Løvebakken refers to a place outside the Parliament) published in 1985 sold 250,000 copies in Norway and earned him the Norwegian Booksellers' Prize. His book Olav – menneske og monark ("Olav – Man and Monarch"), a product of several conversations with his friend King Olav V, was a huge bestseller as well.

He was also a much sought-after lecturer on issues concerning the Middle East and Anti-Semitism. In recent years he managed to create some controversy when he criticized former prime minister and party colleague Kåre Willoch, calling him "the most biased person in the country," on account of Willoch's views on the Middle East and his criticism of Israeli politics.

Benkow died on 18 May 2013, at a hospital in Oslo, aged 88.

== Awards ==
- Defence Medal 1940–1945
- Norwegian Booksellers' Prize, 1985
- Grand Cross of the Order of the White Rose of Finland, 1990
- Grand Decoration of Honour in Gold for Services to the Republic of Austria, 1996
- Knights of the Order of St. Olav, 1998

== Books ==
- Fra synagogen til Løvebakken (1985); From Synagogue to Parliament
- Folkevalgt (1988); Elected by the People
- Haakon, Maud og Olav. Et minnealbum i tekst og bilder (1989); Haakon, Maud and Olav. A Memorial Album of Text and Images
- Hundre år med konge og folk (1990); A Hundred Years with King and Nation
- Olav – menneske og monark (1991); Olav – Man and Monarch
- Det ellevte bud (1994, with afterword by Elie Wiesel); The Eleventh Commandment

Political offices
Preceded by Per Hysing-Dahl	President of the Storting; 1985–1993	Succeeded by Kirsti Kolle Grøndahl
