= Knut Frydenlund =

Norwegian politician

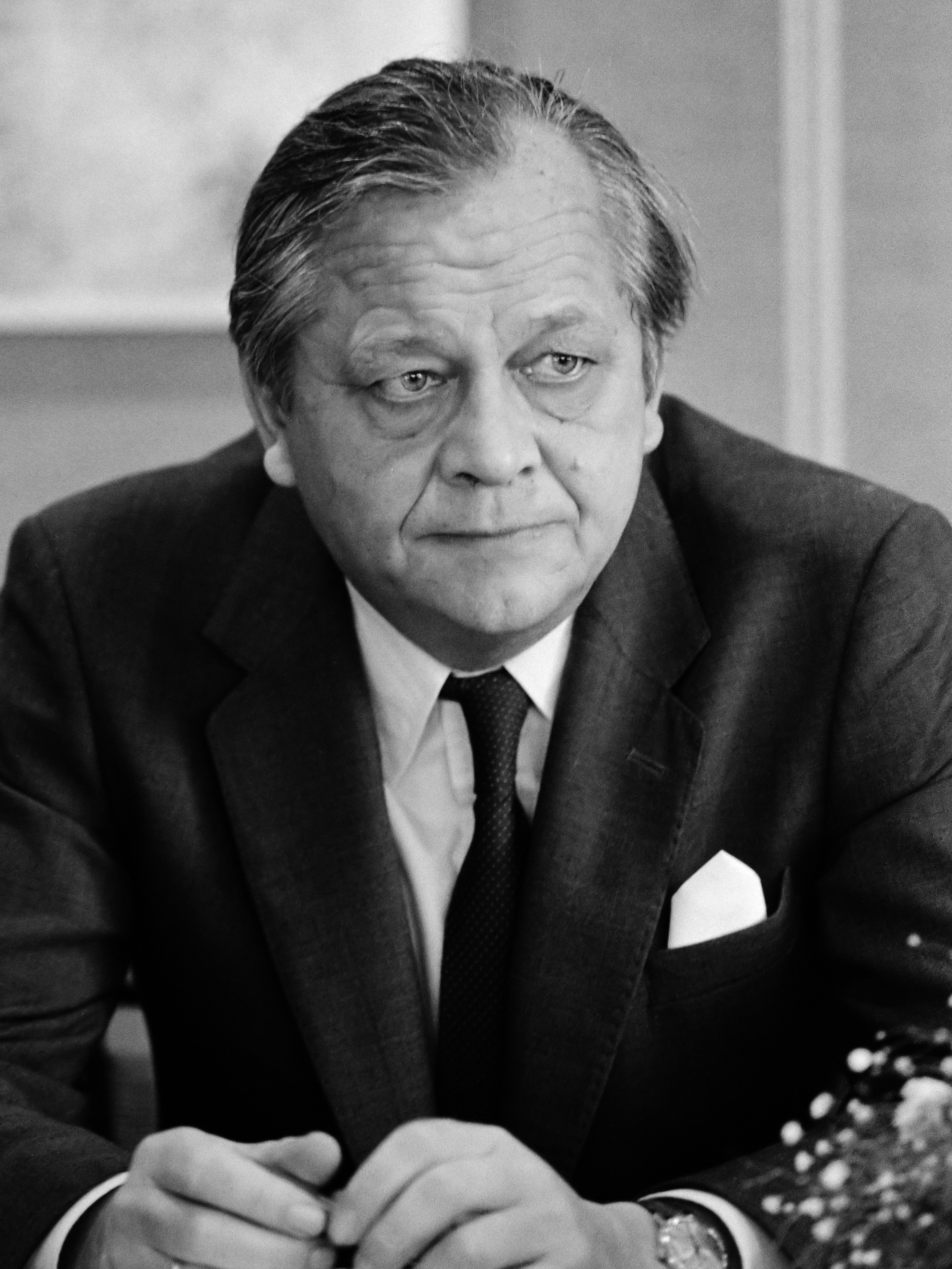
- Frydenlund in 1981

Minister of Foreign Affairs
- In office 9 May 1986 – 26 February 1987
- Prime Minister: Gro Harlem Brundtland
- Preceded by: Svenn Stray
- Succeeded by: Thorvald Stoltenberg
- In office 16 October 1973 – 14 October 1981
- Prime Minister: Trygve Bratteli; Odvar Nordli; Gro Harlem Brundtland
- Preceded by: Dagfinn Vårvik
- Succeeded by: Svenn Stray

Member of the Norwegian Parliament
- In office 1 October 1969 – 26 February 1987
- Constituency: Oslo

Personal details
- Born: 31 March 1927 Drammen, Buskerud, Norway
- Died: 26 February 1987 (aged 59) Oslo, Norway
- Party: Labour
- Spouse: Grethe Nilsen (1958–1987; his death)

Knut Frydenlund (31 March 1927 – 26 February 1987) was a Norwegian diplomat and politician for the Labour Party who served as foreign minister from 1973 to 1981 and again from 1986 to 1987.

Frydenlund was born in Drammen and began his diplomatic career in the 1950s, initially serving at the Norwegian embassy in Bonn, and served in various diplomatic positions during the 1950s and the 1960s. In 1969, he was elected to parliament as a member of the Norwegian Labour Party, and he became foreign minister in the Labour government in 1973. While Labour was out of power from 1981 to 1986, he was replaced as foreign minister by Svenn Thorkild Stray, but returned to the office in May 1986.

In February 1987, following his return from a Nordic Council meeting in Helsinki, Frydenlund collapsed at Oslo's Fornebu Airport due to a cerebral hemorrhage and died soon afterward at Ullevaal Hospital in Oslo.

Political offices
Preceded by Svenn Stray	Minister of Foreign Affairs; 1986–1987	Succeeded by Thorvald Stoltenberg
Preceded by Dagfinn Vårvik	Minister of Foreign Affairs; 1973–1981	Succeeded by Svenn Stray
