= Annelise Høegh =

Norwegian politician (1948–2015)

- Born: 26 July 1948
- Died: 27 March 2015 (aged 66)
- Occupation: Conservative Party politician
- Spouse: Jo Benkow

Annelise Høegh (26 July 1948 – 27 March 2015) was a Norwegian politician for the Conservative Party (Høyre).

Høegh was a member of the Parliament of Norway from 1985 to 2001, representing Oslo. From 1981 to 1985 she was a deputy member of parliament, but met regularly instead of Kåre Willoch who was prime minister.

She remained active in local politics in her hometown of Oslo until her death in 2015.

Høegh's husband, Jo Benkow, was a notable person in the Conservative Party of Norway and the President of the Parliament between 1985 and 1993. The pair married in 1985.
