= Firdaposten =

Norwegian newspaper

- Owner: Amedia (100%)
- Founded: 1948
- Headquarters: Kinn Municipality, Norway
- Circulation: 4,832 (2023)
- Website: firdaposten.no

Firdaposten is a local newspaper published in Kinn Municipality in Vestland county, Norway. It also covers news from Bremanger Municipality. The newspaper was established as a media outlet of the Norwegian Labour Party in 1948. The first editor of the paper was Guttorm Hansen. At the initial phase the paper was published twice a week. It is owned by A-Pressen, and had a circulation of 5481 in 2007.
