= Erling Norvik =

Norwegian politician

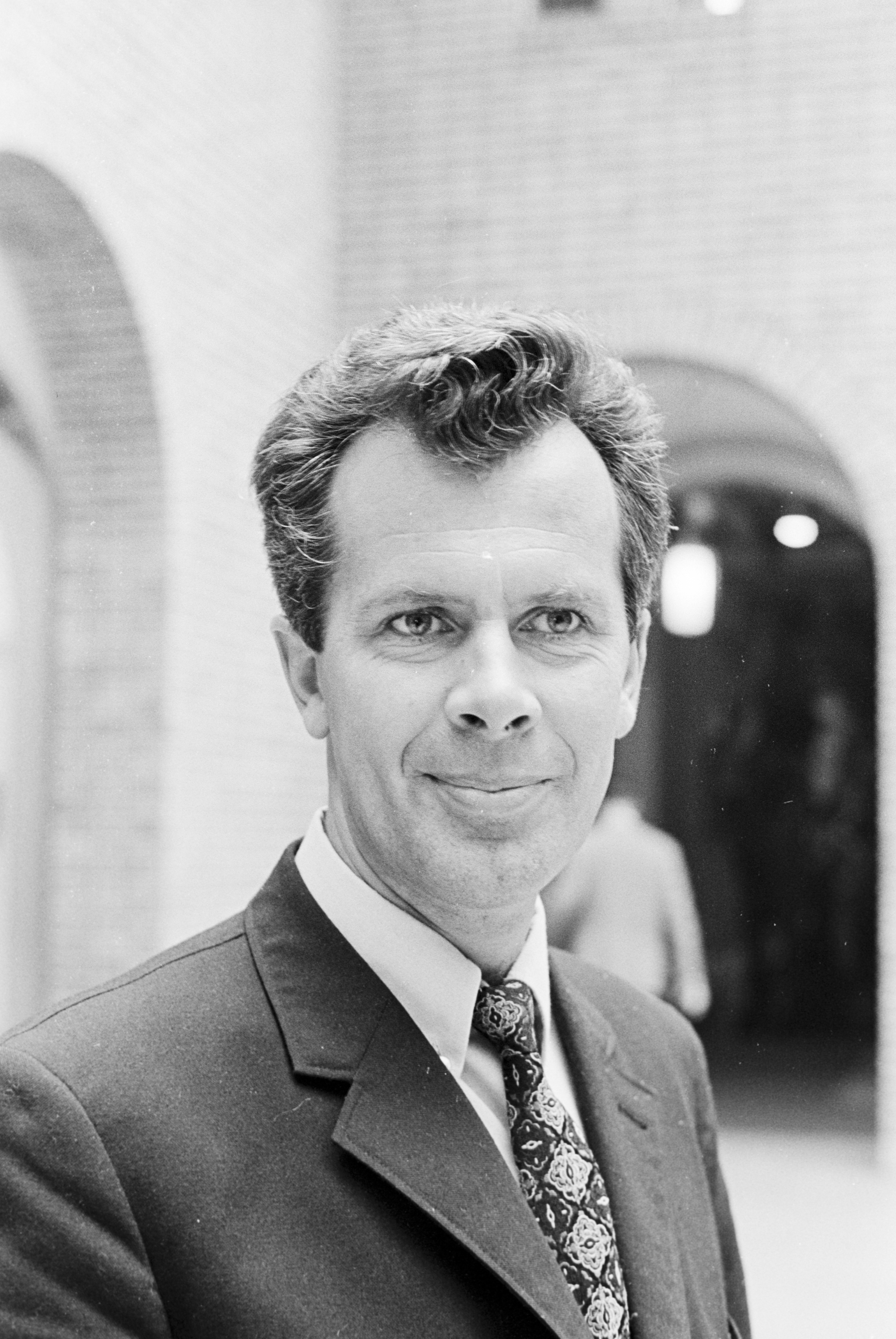
- Norvik in 1970.

County Governor of Østfold
- In office 1 October 1986 – 31 December 1998
- Monarchs: Olav V Harald V
- Prime Minister: Gro Harlem Brundtland; Jan P. Syse; Thorbjørn Jagland; Kjell Magne Bondevik
- Preceded by: Lars Korvald
- Succeeded by: Edvard Grimstad

Leader of the Conservative Party
- In office 25 August 1984 – 20 April 1986
- First Deputy: Kaci Kullmann Five
- Second Deputy: Arne Skauge
- Preceded by: Jo Benkow
- Succeeded by: Rolf Presthus
- In office 12 May 1974 – 4 May 1980
- First Deputy: Lars T. Platou; Jo Benkow
- Second Deputy: Jo Benkow; Astrid Gjertsen
- Preceded by: Kåre Willoch
- Succeeded by: Jo Benkow

General Secretary of the Conservative Party
- In office 26 April 1970 – 12 May 1974
- Leader: Kåre Willoch
- Preceded by: Gudvin Låder Ve
- Succeeded by: Fridtjov Clemet

First Deputy Leader of the Conservative Party
- In office 26 April 1970 – 19 March 1972
- Leader: Kåre Willoch
- Succeeded by: Lars T. Platou

Member of the Norwegian Parliament
- In office 1 October 1961 – 30 September 1973
- Constituency: Finnmark

Personal details
- Born: 9 April 1928 Vadsø, Finnmark, Norway
- Died: 31 December 1998 (aged 70) Oslo, Norway
- Party: Conservative
- Spouse(s): Kate Norvik; Marion Oline Sætermo (formerly)

Erling Norvik (9 April 1928 – 31 December 1998) was a Norwegian politician from the Conservative Party.

Norvik was born in Vadsø, the son of Erling Johannes Norvik, who served in the Norwegian parliament (Stortinget) from 1949 to 1961. The younger Norvik started his professional career as a journalist for the regional paper Finnmarken when he was 12 years old and was elected to Stortinget in 1961 from his native county, Finnmark, succeeding his father.

Norvik was seated in the legislature for three successive periods, from 1961 to 1973 and then resigned to become the leader of the Conservative Party, a post he held from 1974 to 1980 and 1984–1986. He turned down a ministerial post in 1981, choosing instead to work in the prime minister office's of his party colleague Kåre Willoch.

In 1986 he was appointed Governor ("Fylkesmann") of Østfold county, as which he served for 12 years.
