= Kåre Willoch =

Prime Minister of Norway from 1981 to 1986 (1928–2021)

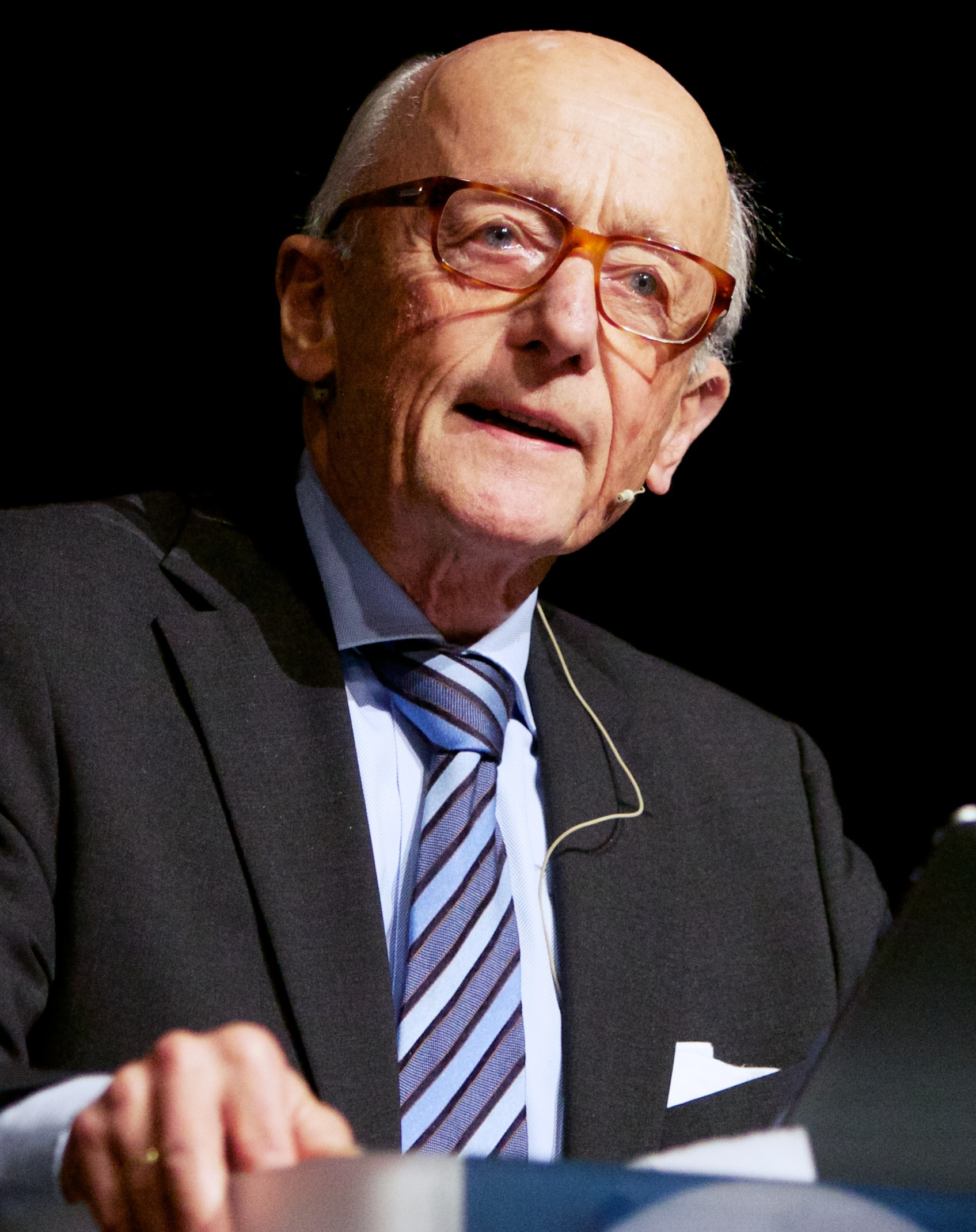
- Willoch in 2012

Prime Minister of Norway
- In office 14 October 1981 – 9 May 1986
- Monarch: Olav V
- Deputy: Kjell Magne Bondevik
- Preceded by: Gro Harlem Brundtland
- Succeeded by: Gro Harlem Brundtland

Leader of the Conservative Party
- In office 26 April 1970 – 12 May 1974
- First Deputy: Erling Norvik; Lars T. Platou
- Second Deputy: Lars T. Platou; Per Hysing-Dahl
- Preceded by: Sjur Lindebrække
- Succeeded by: Erling Norvik

Minister of Trade and Shipping
- In office 12 October 1965 – 5 June 1970
- Prime Minister: Per Borten
- Preceded by: Trygve Lie
- Succeeded by: Otto G. Tidemand
- In office 28 August 1963 – 25 September 1963
- Prime Minister: John Lyng
- Preceded by: O. C. Gundersen
- Succeeded by: Erik Himle

President of the Nordic Council
- In office 1 January 1973 – 31 December 1973
- Preceded by: V. J. Sukselainen
- Succeeded by: Johannes Antonsson

Member of the Storting
- In office 1 January 1958 – 30 September 1989
- Deputy: Ivar Moe; Astri Rynning; Jan P. Syse; Annelise Høegh; Kari Garmann
- Constituency: Oslo

Deputy Member of the Storting
- In office 1 January 1954 – 31 December 1957
- Constituency: Oslo

Personal details
- Born: Kåre Isaachsen Willoch; 3 October 1928 Oslo, Norway
- Died: 6 December 2021 (aged 93) Oslo, Norway
- Resting place: Oslo, Norway
- Party: Conservative
- Spouse: Anne Marie Jørgensen (m. 1954)
- Children: 3
- Parents: Haakon Isaachsen Willoch; Agnes Christine Saure
- Education: University of Oslo

Military service
- Allegiance: Norway
- Branch/service: Norwegian Army

Kåre Isaachsen Willoch (Norwegian pronunciation: [ˈkôːrə ˈîːsɑksn̩ ˈvɪ̀lːɔk]; 3 October 1928 – 6 December 2021) was a Norwegian politician who served as the prime minister of Norway from 1981 to 1986 and as leader of the Conservative Party from 1970 to 1974. He previously served as the minister of trade and shipping from August to September 1963 and 1965 to 1970, and as the president of the Nordic Council in 1973.

After stepping down as prime minister, Willoch later served as Governor of both Oslo as well as Akershus counties from 1990 to 1998 and as chairman of Norway's state broadcasting company NRK from 1998 to 2000. Following his retirement from politics he became an outspoken advocate of the environment and human rights and was widely respected for his activism including amongst Norway's political left. He also wrote several books.

== Early life ==
Willoch was born on 3 October 1928 in Oslo, to Haakon Isaachsen Willoch (1898–1956) and his wife, Agnes Christine Saure (1896–1994). He grew up in the West End of Oslo, and took the examen artium in 1948. After that, he studied economics at the University of Oslo, where he was taught by the Nobel Prize winners Trygve Haavelmo and Ragnar Frisch. He graduated with the cand.oecon. degree in 1953. From 1951 onwards, Willoch was a member of the Oslo city council, and later in 1953, he became a deputy in the Parliament of Norway. He became a member of parliament after the 1957 parliamentary election, and was at 29 years then the youngest MP.

On 1 May 1954, he married Anne Marie Jørgensen (born 9 March 1930).

Willoch graduated as an economist (cand. oecon.) from the University of Oslo. He served in the Norwegian Brigade that formed part of the Allied occupation in Schleswig-Holstein, Germany, after World War II, and became a dedicated friend of Germany during that time.

He spoke Norwegian, English, German and French fluently.

== Political life ==
An economist (characterized in 1981 as being "supply side") by education and profession, Willoch made an early mark in national politics on issues related to economic development. He expressed deep skepticism about social democratic reforms throughout most of the post-World War II era and advocated a larger role for market mechanisms to solve economic problems.

Within the Conservative Party, Willoch was respected for his command of the issues and consistent ideological platform. In spite of friendly rivalries with Erling Norvik, Rolf Presthus, and Jan P. Syse, these and other party members led a political shift in Norway away from the nation's social democratic legacy.

=== Parliamentary and ministerial posts ===
Willoch's first political post was as a member of the Oslo City Council from 1952 to 1959.

Willoch was first elected to the Norwegian parliament at the age of 29 in 1957, representing Oslo. Thereafter he was elected in every parliamentary election until 1989.

He was appointed Minister of Trade in the short-lived but notable John Lyng cabinet from August to September 1963, following the Kings Bay Affair that brought to an end the uninterrupted chain of Labor governments after World War II, headed by Einar Gerhardsen and Oscar Torp.

He was appointed to the same ministerial post in the government of Per Borten from 1965 to 1970. He stepped down from this post to become first the Parliamentary leader, and then the chairman of the Conservative Party from 1970 to 1974.

In 1973, he unified his party in opposition to the newly introduced restrictions on use of land. This formed a watershed in Norwegian politics, in that the party adopted a stronger ideological alternative to the social democratic establishment that had dominated post-World War II politics. Some historians, notably Francis Sejersted attribute this in large part to the Norwegian Labour Party's exuberant continuation of social democratic efforts.

Willoch served as the leader of the Foreign Affairs committee in the coalition government and from then until he retired from parliament in 1989.

As a member of the Borten government he faced the constitutional question of the marriage of the then Crown Prince Harald to a commoner, Sonja Haraldsen (they married in 1968 and since 1991 have been the king and queen of Norway). Willoch is reported to have never considered opposing the union.

Most of Willoch's political career was spent in opposition to various Labour governments. His rhetorical style was characterized by a use of language and carefully articulated viewpoints that many considered cold or even sarcastic. His debates with long-time adversary Gro Harlem Brundtland became legendary in Norway and were by several accounts based on personal as well as political differences. Brundtland wrote in her memoirs that she learned from Willoch "how not to treat people, or parties."

=== Premiership ===
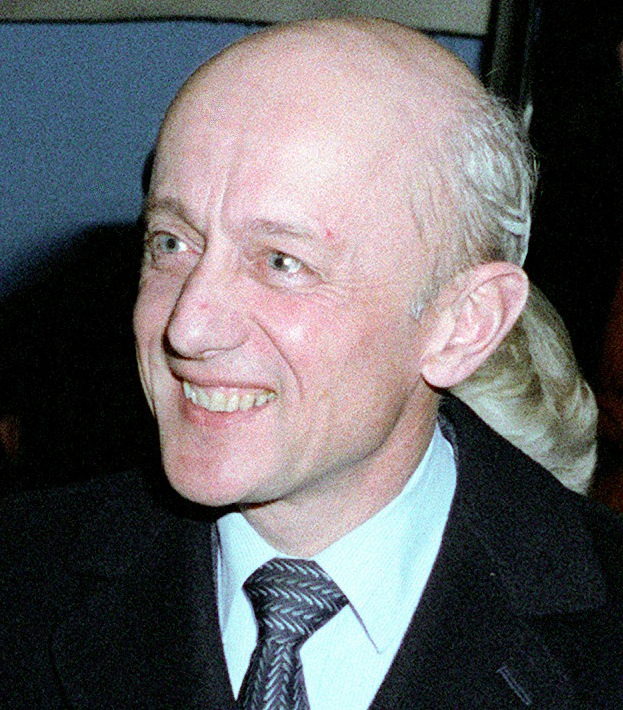
Willoch during his premiership, 1983

Willoch was asked to form a Conservative party government when a non-socialist coalition gained a majority in the parliamentary elections of 1981. The cabinet depended on the support of the Christian Democrats and Centre Party, and in 1983 these joined the cabinet to become a coalition government.

When Braathens SAFE Flight 139 was hijacked, the hijacker demanded to speak with Willoch.

By the parliamentary elections of 1985, Willoch's cabinet had lost much of its parliamentary basis and was dependent on the Progress party for support. The cabinet lost a vote of no-confidence over Willoch's proposal to increase surcharges on gasoline, when the Socialist Left Party, Labour Party, and Progress party joined forces. A minority government led by Gro Harlem Brundtland took over through the rest of the parliamentary period.

In spite of difficult parliamentary conditions, the Willoch cabinet embarked on a series of reforms that to many seemed like reversals of long-standing social democratic reforms, and to others changes that reflected new and emerging economic realities.

Often cited changes included:

- Dissolution of the governmental monopoly on radio and television broadcasting, including allowing the introduction of commercially funded content.
- Ending government intervention in credit markets, which in turn led to freer access to credit by both consumers and businesses.
- Reducing restrictions on ownership and sale of real estate
- Reducing restrictions on retail trade, especially with respect to opening hours
- Several efforts at strengthening the non-petroleum related Norwegian economy

The Willoch government's foreign policy was largely consistent with those of prior Labour party cabinets in terms of Norwegian commitments under the NATO treaty, but deviated sharply on the issue of non-proliferation. Where the Labour Party promoted a policy of "reduction of tensions" in the Nordic region, which marginalized Norway in NATO, the Willoch cabinet approved forward logistical bases for U.S. rapid deployment forces and lent full support to the NATO double track decision of 1979.

Willoch earned a reputation as a sharp-witted, sometimes acerbic politician. During his years in parliament and in various governments, he was respected by his political allies and opponents alike, but never gained the popularity of other prime ministers in his time in office.

== Later life ==
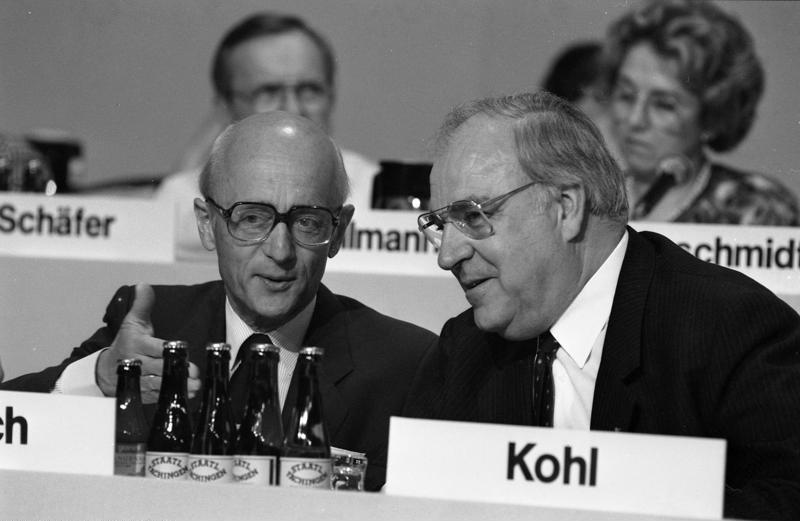
Willoch visiting German chancellor Helmut Kohl during CDU's federal party congress, 1988

Willoch served as county governor (fylkesmann) of Oslo and Akershus from 1990 to 1998. From 1998 to 2000 he was chairman of NRK, the Norwegian Broadcasting Corporation. He was also director of the Nansen Institute. From 1986 on, he was deputy chairman of the International Democrat Union (IDU). He was President of the Deutsch-Norwegische Gesellschaft (German-Norwegian Society) from 1987 to 1991.

Considered one of the most pronounced conservative Norwegian politicians in his time, in later years he shifted his position in many areas and became known for his advocacy of human rights and environmental issues. He took issue with the "culture of greed", "tax paradises', the environment, and criticised Israel's policies toward Palestinians, stating that the occupation of and settlement on Palestinian land (outside the 1967 borders) is unlawful. The extent of the political left's newfound respect for Willoch after he left office was summarised by social democrat former government minister Hallvard Bakke, who when criticising Willoch's defense of some of his policies regarding the surveillance of communists in the 1980s noted that Willoch had become the most important voice on the Middle East conflict and many other issues, but that "Willoch isn't always right".

Widely respected for his activism and argumentative style, he accused Israel of "ethnic cleansing" stated that it is "creating terror" by cultivating extremism "as if in a greenhouse in the Palestinian areas". Supporters of Israel such as Jo Benkow criticised his views as partisan and unapologetically pro-Palestinian. Willoch also stated that, though "there are strong reasons to warn against the new antisemitism, it will not strengthen Israel's cause to accuse critics of Israeli politics of antisemitism". He also claimed that Israel indirectly contributes to antisemitism stating that "It would be naïve to ignore that Israel's politics towards the Palestinians has become a new source of negative attitudes." In May 2006, Willoch invited Atef Adwan, an official in Hamas to a private luncheon at Det Norske Selskab, commenting that "A dialogue with Hamas is very useful."

In an op-ed in the newspaper Aftenposten, Willoch summarized his views on Israel's policies towards the Palestinians. He warned that "those who defend the Israeli policies towards the Palestinians support a policy that generates a hatred that may lead to a disaster for Israel" and concluded that "Friends of Israel should seek to make Israel accept the Arab peace proposal. It demands, amongst other things, borders as before the war of 1967, only with such adjustments that the parties reach agreement upon, and guarantees for Israel's security."

Willoch said the appointment of Rahm Emanuel, who had once volunteered for the Israeli military despite being a U.S. citizen and who had criticised the George W. Bush administration for not being supportive enough of Israel, was probably not an indication that President Barack Obama would significantly change U.S. policy on the Middle East, referencing then-ongoing U.S. debate on the appointment, in which Emanuel's father Benjamin Emanuel, a former Irgun member, had said that "obviously he will influence the president to be pro-Israel. Why wouldn't he be? What is he, an Arab? He's not going to clean the floors of the White House", a comment that Rahm Emanuel later apologised for. Willoch's comment was later taken out of context by the anti-immigration Progress Party; liberal daily Dagbladet described the accusations against Willoch by the far-right as "unreasonable, unfair, and at worst harmful."

Regarding Cablegate, he stated that "the problem is that the Western world is violating Human rights, not that someone is uncovering those violations".

In 1996, Willoch was decorated as a Commander with Star of the Order of St. Olav.

Kåre Willoch died in his home in Oslo, on 6 December 2021, at the age of 93.

Kåre Willoch translated Economics in one lesson into Norwegian in 1952.

== Bibliography ==
- Willoch, Kåre: Minner og meninger, Chr. Schibsteds Forlag, Oslo 1988, ISBN 82-516-1231-4
- Willoch, Kåre: Statsminister, Chr. Schibsteds Forlag, Oslo 1990, ISBN 82-516-1350-7
- Willoch, Kåre: Tanker i tiden Cappelen, 1999, ISBN 82-02-18596-3
- Willoch, Kåre: Myter og virkelighet, Cappelen, 2002, ISBN 82-02-20460-7
- Willoch, Kåre: Utfordringer, Cappelen, 2004, ISBN 82-02-23572-3
- Willoch, Kåre: "Strid og samarbeid", Cappelen Damm, 2016, ISBN 978-82-02-51041-1

Political offices
Preceded by Oscar Chr. Gundersen	Norwegian Minister of Trade and Shipping; August – September 1963	Succeeded by Erik Himle
Preceded by Trygve Lie	Norwegian Minister of Trade and Shipping; 1965–1970	Succeeded by Otto Grieg Tidemand
Preceded by Gro Harlem Brundtland	Prime Minister of Norway; 1981–1986	Succeeded by Gro Harlem Brundtland
Preceded by Gunnar Alf Larsen	County Governor of Akershus; 1989–1998	Succeeded by Karin Moe Røisland
Party political offices
Preceded by Sjur Lindebrække	Leader of the Conservative Party; 1970–1974	Succeeded by Erling Norvik
Non-profit organization positions
Preceded by	President of the German-Norwegian Society; 1986–1992	Succeeded by Fredrik Bull-Hansen
Media offices
Preceded by Trygve Ramberg	Chairman of the Norwegian Broadcasting Corporation; 1998–2000	Succeeded by Torger Reve
Awards
Preceded by Arne Skouen	Recipient of the Fritt Ord Award; 1997	Succeeded by Alexander Nikitin
