= Elverum Authorization =

Norwegian declaration during World War II

Coordinates: 60.8814°N 11.5639°E

The Elverum Authorization (Norwegian: Elverumsfullmakta) allowed the Cabinet of Norway to temporarily and legitimately assert absolute authority given that the Storting (the Norwegian parliament) was no longer able to convene in ordinary session in Oslo because of the German invasion of Norway. The action was approved unanimously by the Storting in Elverum on 9 April 1940, after the Norwegian royal family, the Cabinet, and the Storting had evacuated Oslo to evade capture by German troops in the course of Operation Weserübung during World War II.

== Text ==
The authorization reads, in translated form:

The Storting authorizes the Government, until the time comes when the Government and the presidency of the Storting is able to confer and assemble the Storting to its next ordinary session, to maintain the interests of the realm and make those decisions and determinations on behalf of the Storting and Government, that are considered needed to maintain the country's security and future.

== Significance ==
The authorization is of historical significance because it allowed the Norwegian executive branch to assert legitimacy – even while in exile.

== Debate ==
The authorization is controversial in that it constituted a complete abandonment of the legislative powers in Norway during the war. The issue was brought to the Supreme Court of Norway, which ruled that the authorization was legitimate and valid.

Critics have stated that the authorization was invalid because there was no constitutional basis for the Storting to dissolve itself in such a manner. These critics also claim that Section 17 – which was invoked in the authorization – only authorized emergency powers within the areas of "trade", "customs", "economy", and "police" until the Storting could be seated again.

Germany demanded the king to appoint Vidkun Quisling as prime minister. He refused, but if he had done that, together with the Elverum Authorization, Quisling would have gotten a formal right to be dictator of Norway. Instead, Quisling was the dictator only on authorization of Hitler and the German troops.

== Result ==
In any event, the legitimacy of the exiled government was to little extent called into question during the war, except by the Quisling government and the German occupying power. Tormod Otter Johansen, a professor with the University of Gothenburg's Law Department, later noted that "It is not difficult to see the emergency during an occupation, and the resistance that the government and resistance movement felt necessary to engage in on the basis of this emergency. The legal argument for constitutional necessity seems pertinent to this case, since there can be no greater ‘constitutional’ threat than the occupation and dissolving of the existing state. The threat to human life and security by the occupants further motivated the use of emergency powers."
