= Sjur Lindebrække =

Norwegian banker and politician (1909–1998)

Sjur Lindebrække (6 April 1909 – 1 October 1998) was a Norwegian banker and Conservative politician.

== Biography ==
He was born on 6 April 1909, in Voss Municipality.

During the 1940 Norwegian Campaign, Lindebrække was mobilized by the Norwegian 4th Division.

From 1940, he worked as assistant manager in Bergens Privatbank, and became bank manager in 1945, administrative director in 1959, and from 1969 he was working chairman. He was a Storting representative between 1945 and 1953, and was chairman of the Norwegian Conservative Party from 1962 to 1970.

Lindebrække was a member of the Norwegian Nobel Committee from 1976 to 1981. Together with Bernt Ingvaldsen he worked to undermine Hélder Câmara as candidate, cooperating with the Brazilian ambassador in Oslo as the military dictatorship in Brazil was vehemently against Câmara receiving the Nobel peace prize. He died on 1 October 1998, aged 89.

== Bibliography ==
- Hunnes, E. (1950). Den norske hærs intendantur 1925-1950 (in Norwegian). Oslo.

Party political offices
Preceded by Alv Kjøs	Chairman of the Norwegian Conservative Party; 1962–1970	Succeeded by Kåre Willoch
