= Braathens SAFE Flight 139 =

1985 aircraft hijacking in Norway

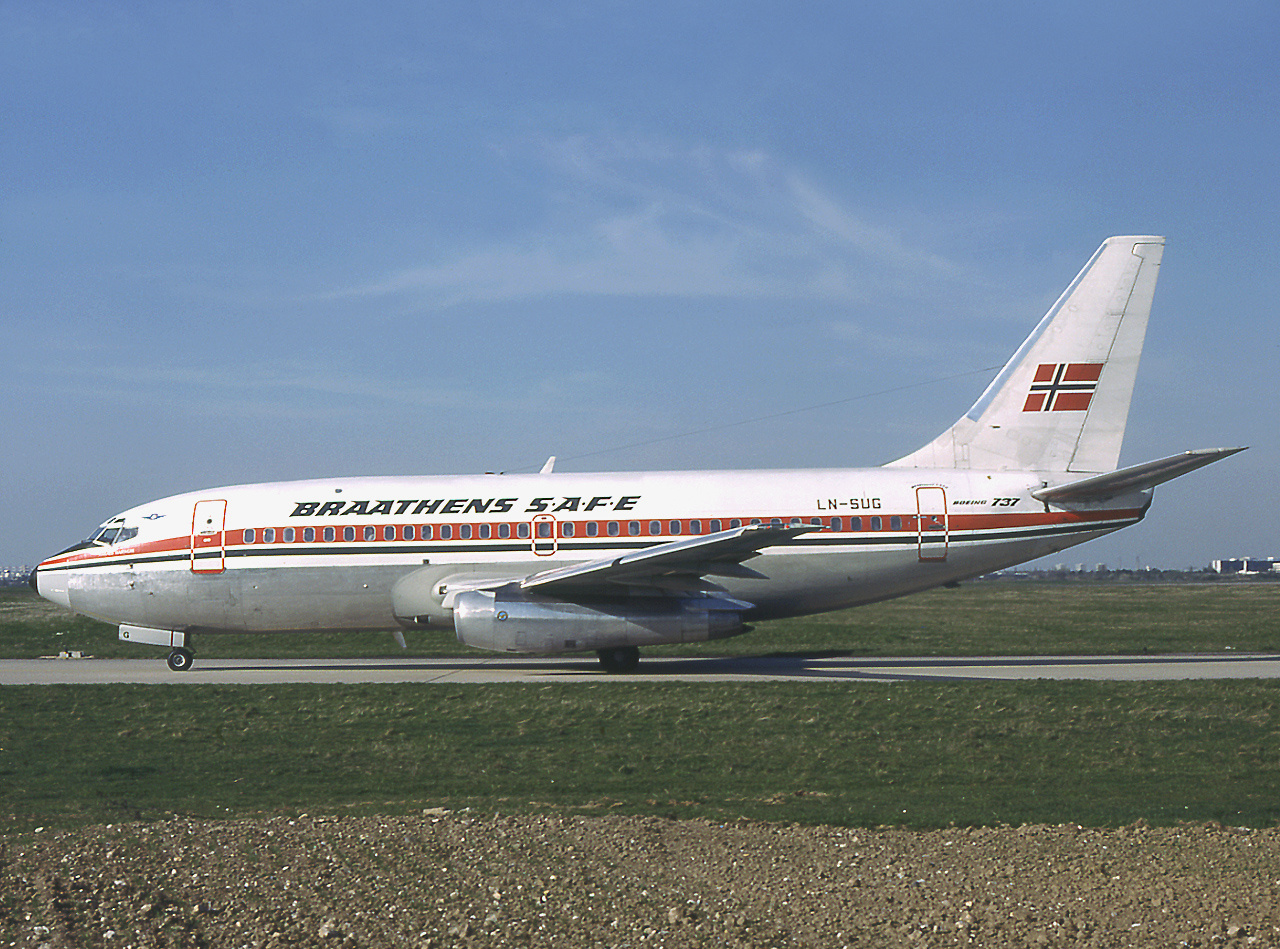
- LN-SUG, the hijacked aircraft photographed in 1982

Hijacking
- Date: 21 June 1985
- Summary: Hijacking
- Site: Tromsø flyplass, Fornebu

Aircraft
- Aircraft type: Boeing 737-205
- Aircraft name: Harald Gille
- Operator: Braathens SAFE
- IATA flight No.: BU139
- ICAO flight No.: BRA139
- Call sign: BRAATHENS 139
- Registration: LN-SUG
- Flight origin: Trondheim Airport, Værnes
- Destination: Oslo Airport, Fornebu
- Occupants: 121
- Passengers: 116
- Crew: 5
- Fatalities: 0
- Injuries: 0
- Survivors: 121

Braathens SAFE Flight 139 was an aircraft hijacking that occurred in Norway on 21 June 1985. The incident took place on a Boeing 737-200 belonging to Braathens SAFE that was on a scheduled domestic flight from Trondheim Airport, Værnes to Oslo Airport, Fornebu. The hijacker was Stein Arvid Huseby, who was drunk during most of the incident. It was the first plane hijacking to take place in Norway; there were no deaths and no injuries. Huseby was sentenced to three years' imprisonment and five years' detention.

Armed with an air gun, Huseby threatened a cabin attendant and told the captain to proceed as planned to Fornebu. He claimed (falsely) to have placed explosives on board. His demands were to make a political statement and talk to Prime Minister Kåre Willoch and Minister of Justice Mona Røkke. The plane landed at 15:30 at Fornebu and was surrounded by the police. After one hour, Huseby released 70 hostages in exchange for having the aircraft moved closer to the terminal building. Thirty minutes later, Huseby released the remaining passengers. He drank throughout the incident, and at 17:30, after he consumed the plane's beer supply, he surrendered his weapon in exchange for more beer. The plane was immediately stormed and Huseby was arrested.

== Hijacking ==
The hijacking occurred on board Braathens SAFE Flight 139 en route from Trondheim Airport, Værnes to Oslo Airport, Fornebu. The aircraft was a Boeing 737-205, named Harald Gille (after Harald IV of Norway) with registration LN-SUG. The day before the hijacking, Huseby graduated from upper secondary school, where he studied health and social work. That evening, he purchased an air gun in Trondheim. The weapon was in his hand luggage when boarding the aircraft at Trondheim Airport, Værnes, where there was no security control. He selected a seat at the rear of the aircraft. While airborne, the hijacker showed a female flight attendant the air gun and asked her to inform the captain that he wanted control over the aircraft, but that otherwise all was to proceed as planned. The flight attendant and later the hijacker used the intercom to communicate with the pilot. The police were informed about the incident via air controllers at 15:05.

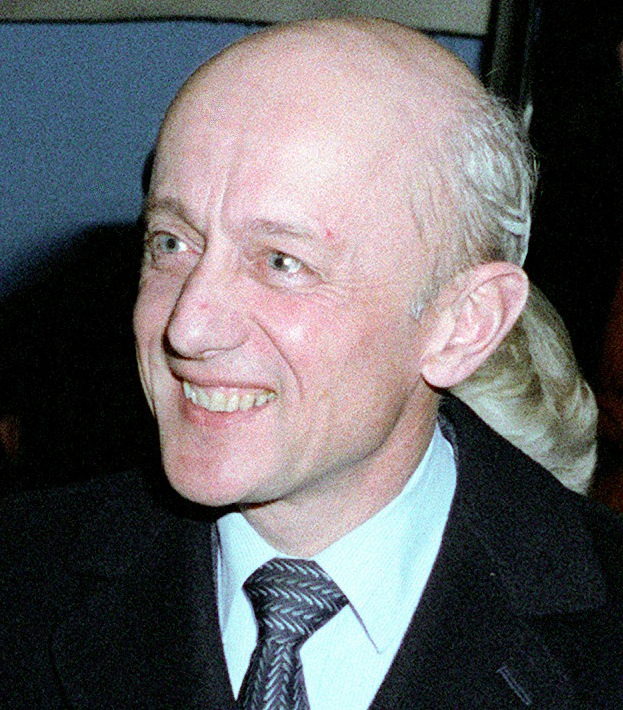
The hijacker demanded to speak to Prime Minister Kåre Willoch (pictured)

The plane landed at Fornebu at 15:30, fifteen minutes after schedule. The aircraft parked at a location 700 metres (2,300 ft) from the terminal. It was immediately surrounded by police special forces, as well as officers from Asker and Bærum Police Department. Two special-trained police officers were placed in the control tower, where they negotiated with Huseby. Fornebu was closed, and air traffic was rerouted to Oslo Airport, Gardermoen. The passengers were not informed about the incident until the aircraft was surrounded by the police. The hijacker informed the passengers and crew falsely that he had placed explosives in the toilet rooms, but that no one would be hurt if they cooperated. Huseby was dressed in a suit with sunglasses. The passengers on board described his actions as calm. During the whole incident, Huseby repeatedly asked for and drank beer.

Huseby's demands were to talk to Prime Minister Kåre Willoch and Minister of Justice Mona Røkke, both from the Conservative Party. He also wanted to hold a press conference at Fornebu. Huseby was unsatisfied with his treatment after he left prison. He demanded to receive guarantees for better treatment and economic security from the authorities. Assisted by a psychologist, the police negotiated with Huseby. One hour after the plane landed, 70 passengers were let out of the plane. The first group were those passengers who had or claimed they had transfers to other flights. In exchange, the aircraft was moved closer to the terminal building. The passengers were picked up by a bus and transported to the domestic terminal, where the police questioned them. The remaining passengers were let out thirty minutes later. Only the five crew members remained.

A friend of Huseby helped the police in the negotiations. At 18:30, the aircraft was out of beer, so Huseby agreed to throw the gun out of the window in exchange for more beer. This was delivered by a civilian police officer. The aircraft was then immediately stormed by special forces and Huseby was arrested. No one was injured in the hijacking.

== Aftermath ==
Stein Arvid Huseby, originally from Karmøy Municipality, was at the time 24 years old. He had just finished studying at a Christian upper secondary school in Trondheim. He had previously been sentenced five times for violent offenses, including an armed robbery of a taxi and threatening a lensmann with a shotgun. He was beaten and abused by his father, and started drinking as a 13-year-old. He lost his job as a seaman due to drunkenness, and was put into a psychiatric institution in 1980, aged 19. In 1983, he was admitted to a Christian school, and had managed to stay away from alcohol for two years, but had started again just prior to the incident. He stated that he was afraid to lose his friends due to his misuse of alcohol.

During the court case, Huseby stated that he wanted help from society and attention drawn to his cause. However, he stated that he regretted doing this by hijacking. He stated that all he wanted was to send a message to the minister of justice and prime minister that he needed help, and that he did not intend that the other passengers be aware of his threats. Huseby stated that the hijacking was spontaneous and that he planned to make an armed robbery or take hostages at the Radisson SAS hotel in Oslo. His defence lawyer argued that Huseby did not commit a hijacking in the letter of the law, but had instead taken hostages, which would result in a lesser sentence. The court psychologists stated that Huseby had a difficult childhood, and had been defined as an alcoholic at the age of 17. They considered him to have a very underdeveloped ability to make rational decisions and weak mental health. They also stated that he committed crimes to identify himself due to his low self-esteem. On 29 May 1986, Huseby was found guilty of hijacking in Eidsivating Court of Appeal. He was sentenced to three years in prison and five years of preventive supervision.
