= List of presidents of the Lagting =

List of presidents of the Lagting since 1945, one of the two subdivisions of the Parliament of Norway from 1945 to 2009, when the chamber was discontinued.

No.	Portrait	President	Took office	Left office	Time in office	Party
1	Jakob A. Lothe	Jakob A. Lothe (1881–1975)	10 December 1945	10 January 1954	8 years, 31 days	Liberal
2	Bent Røiseland	Bent Røiseland (1902–1981)	16 January 1954	11 January 1959	4 years, 360 days	Liberal
3	Elisæus Vatnaland	Elisæus Vatnaland (1892–1983)	12 January 1959	30 September 1960	1 year, 262 days	Centre
(2)	Bent Røiseland	Bent Røiseland (1902–1981)	1 October 1960	30 September 1961	364 days	Liberal
4	Nils Hønsvald	Nils Hønsvald (1899–1971)	6 October 1961	30 September 1965	3 years, 359 days	Labour
(2)	Bent Røiseland	Bent Røiseland (1902–1981)	8 October 1965	30 September 1969	3 years, 357 days	Liberal
5	Lars Korvald	Lars Korvald (1916–2006)	8 October 1969	18 October 1972	3 years, 10 days	Christian Democratic
6	Egil Aarvik	Egil Aarvik (1912–1990)	24 October 1972	30 September 1973	341 days	Christian Democratic
7	Torild Skard	Torild Skard (born 1936)	9 October 1973	30 September 1977	3 years, 356 days	Socialist Left
8	Margit Tøsdal	Margit Tøsdal (1918–1993)	11 October 1977	30 September 1981	3 years, 354 days	Labour
9	Thor Knudsen	Thor Knudsen (1927–2006)	8 October 1981	30 September 1989	7 years, 357 days	Conservative
10	Hans J. Røsjorde	Hans J. Røsjorde (born 1941)	10 October 1989	30 September 1993	3 years, 355 days	Progress
11	Jan P. Syse	Jan P. Syse (1930–1997)	11 October 1993	17 September 1997	3 years, 341 days	Conservative
12	Odd Holten	Odd Holten (born 1940)	8 October 1997	30 September 2001	3 years, 357 days	Christian Democratic
13	Lodve Solholm	Lodve Solholm (born 1949)	9 October 2001	30 September 2005	3 years, 356 days	Progress
14	Inge Lønning	Inge Lønning (1938–2013)	10 October 2005	30 September 2009	3 years, 355 days	Conservative
