= Lars Korvald =

Norwegian politician

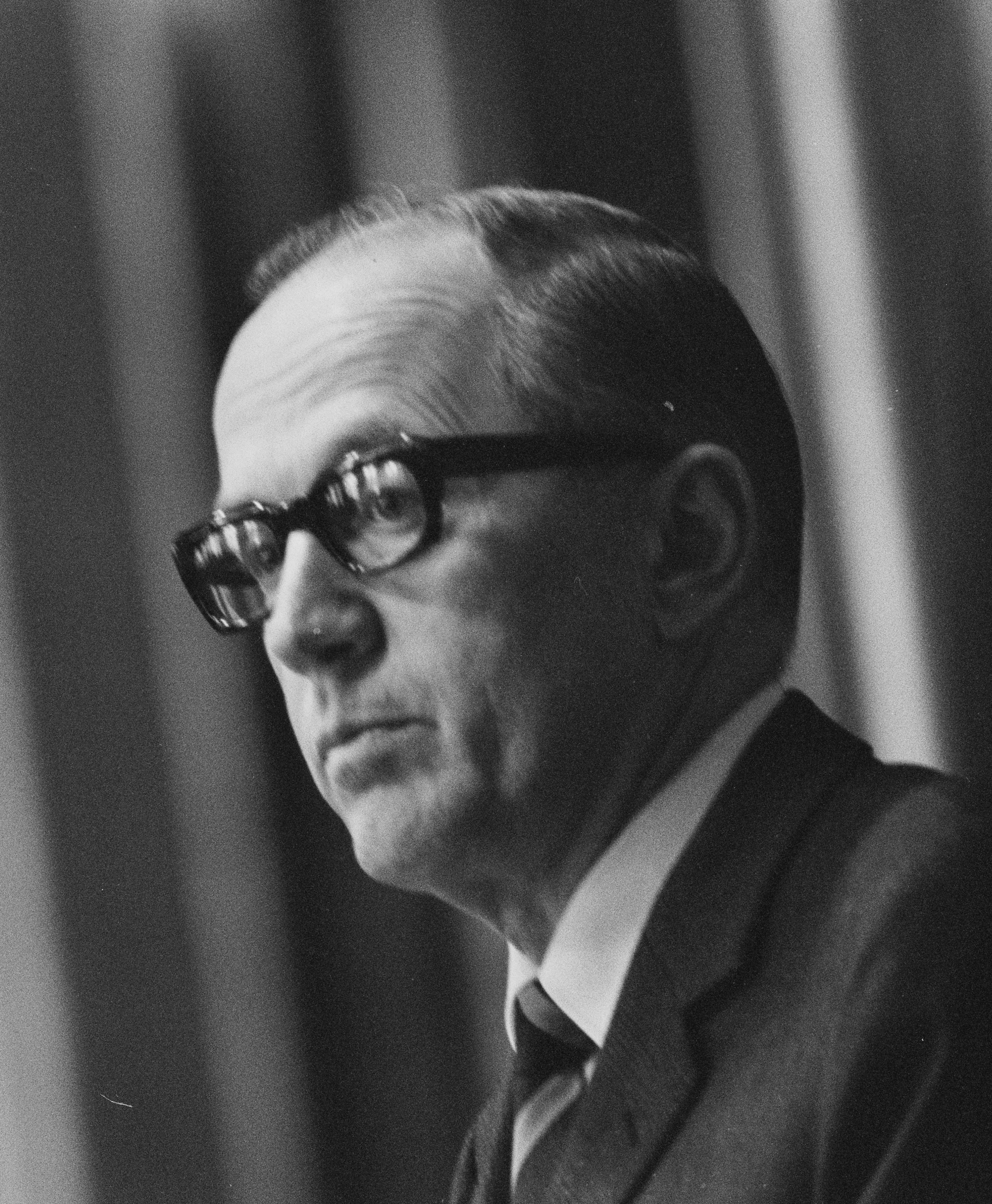

Prime Minister of Norway
- In office 18 October 1972 – 16 October 1973
- Monarch: Olav V
- Preceded by: Trygve Bratteli
- Succeeded by: Trygve Bratteli

Leader of the Christian Democratic Party
- In office 1967–1975
- Preceded by: Einar Hareide
- Succeeded by: Kåre Kristiansen
- In office 1977–1979
- Preceded by: Kåre Kristiansen
- Succeeded by: Kåre Kristiansen

County Governor of Østfold
- In office 1 October 1981 – 1 October 1986
- Monarch: Olav V
- Prime Minister: Kåre Willoch; Gro Harlem Brundtland
- Preceded by: Jakob Modalsli
- Succeeded by: Erling Norvik

Member of the Norwegian Parliament
- In office 1 October 1961 – 30 September 1981
- Deputy: Odd Steinar Holøs
- Constituency: Østfold

President of the Lagting
- In office 8 October 1969 – 18 October 1972
- Vice President: Aase Lionæs
- Preceded by: Bent Røiseland
- Succeeded by: Egil Aarvik

Personal details
- Born: 29 April 1916 Mjøndalen, Buskerud, Norway
- Died: 4 July 2006 (aged 90) Mjøndalen, Buskerud, Norway
- Party: Christian Democratic
- Spouse: Ruth Aarny Borgersen (m. 1943)
- Children: 5

Lars Korvald (29 April 1916 – 4 July 2006) was a Norwegian politician and educator who served as the prime minister of Norway from 1972 to 1973. He became associated with the Christian Democratic Party and was elected to the Norwegian Parliament. As prime minister he led the cabinet that took over when Trygve Bratteli resigned in the wake of the first referendum over Norway's membership in the European Economic Community.

== Early life and career ==
Lars Korvald was born at Nedre Eiker in Buskerud, Norway. His parents were Engebret Korvald (1873-1956) and Karen Sofie Wigen (1876-1965). He attended Hamar Cathedral School graduating in 1940. He attended the Norwegian College of Agriculture at Ås in Akershus where he graduated in 1943.

Lars Korvald had been educated in agricultural studies. Upon graduation, he joined the faculty of the Tomb Agricultural School (Tomb Jordbruksskol). The school was situated by the Krokstadfjordenon at Råde in Østfold. This was the site of a former estate (Tomb herregård i Råde) which had dated from the Middle Ages. In 1938, the estate was purchased by the Norwegian Lutheran Mission (Det norske lutherske Indremisjonsselskap) which established a high school and a modern farm operation on the property. The school offered several education programs with the principal focus on agriculture and agronomy. Korvald became Rector at Tomb in 1952.

== Parliamentary career ==
Korvald was first elected to the Parliament of Norway in 1961 representing the county of Østfold. In 1965, he was appointed parliamentary leader; and in 1967 the party leader. Altogether, Korvald served as a member of Parliament for five terms between 1961 and 1981. He was President of the Lagting 1969–1972.

== Prime minister ==
Lars Korvald served as prime minister from 18 October 1972 to 16 October 1973. Though short-lived, his cabinet served as an important milestone in Norwegian politics, both because it marked the conclusion of the bitter and divisive debate over Norway's membership in the European Economic Community (EEC) and because it was a centrist non-socialist coalition. He was also the first prime minister from the Christian Democratic Party.

Korvald proved to be an effective prime minister in a very difficult and transitional political situation. His cabinet commissioned the negotiations for a trade treaty with the EEC and instituted Norway's first petroleum policy. In addition, the Teachers' Training Law of June 1973 was a move to raise teacher training to university status.

Korvald didn’t seek re-election in 1981 to the Storting after 20 years of service. That same autumn he was appointed County Governor in Østfold. He held in this position until he retired at the age of 70 in 1986.

== Personal life ==
In 1943, he married Ruth Aarny Borgersen (1915–2006). While serving as prime minister, Korvald resided in Bærum. He later resided in Moss, but in his later life he moved back to Mjøndalen.

Political offices
Preceded by Trygve Bratteli	Prime Minister of Norway; 1972–1973	Succeeded by Trygve Bratteli
Civic offices
Preceded by Jakob Modalsli	County Governor of Østfold; 1981–1986	Succeeded by Erling Norvik
