= Bent Røiseland =

Norwegian politician

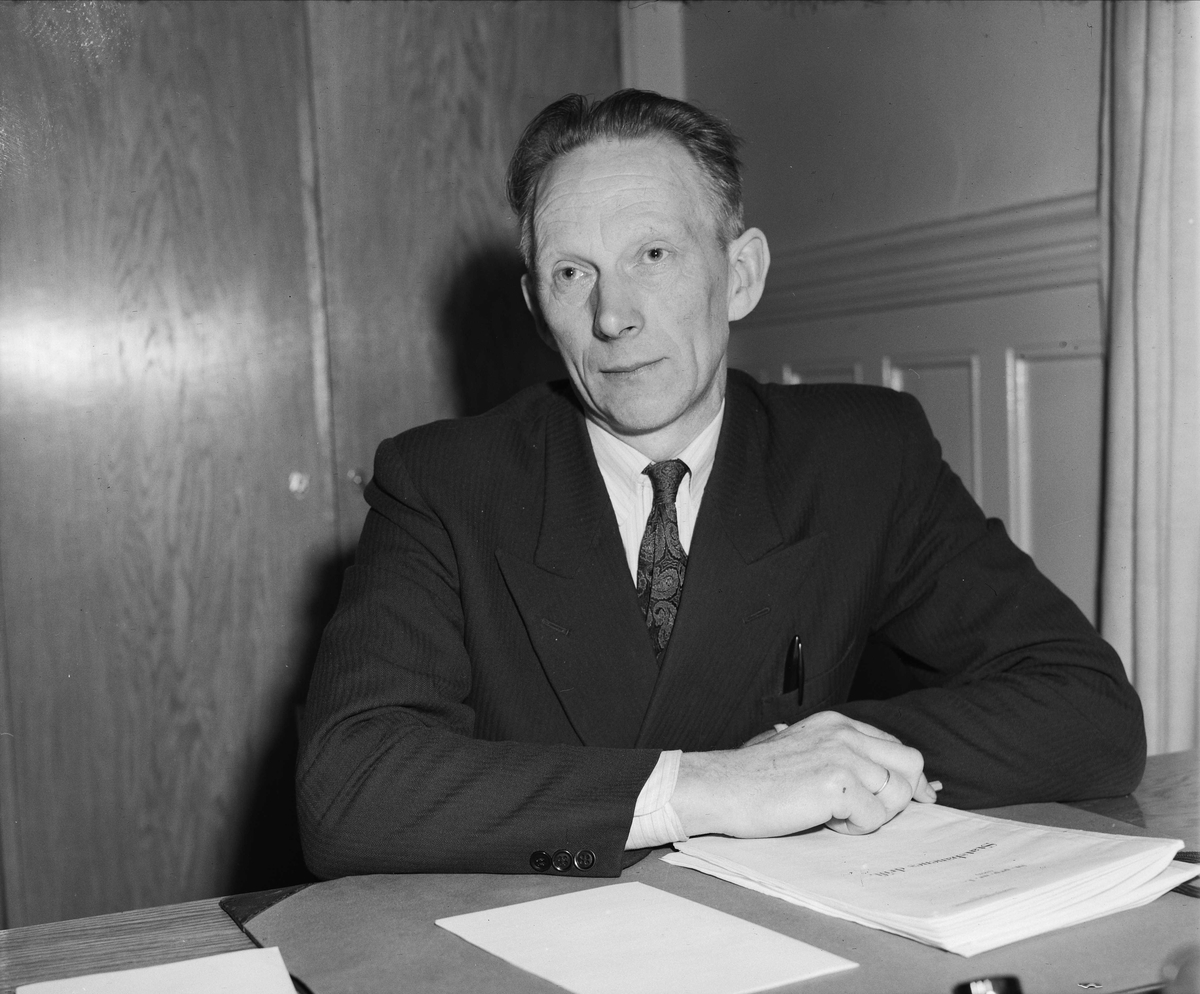
- Røiseland in 1952.

President of the Lagting
- In office 8 October 1965 – 30 September 1969
- Vice President: Aase Lionæs
- Preceded by: Nils Hønsvald
- Succeeded by: Lars Korvald
- In office 1 October 1960 – 30 September 1961
- Preceded by: Elisæus Vatnaland
- Succeeded by: Nils Hønsvald
- In office 16 January 1954 – 11 January 1959
- Preceded by: Jakob A. Lothe
- Succeeded by: Elisæus Vatnaland

Leader of the Liberal Party
- In office 1952–1964
- Preceded by: Jacob S. Worm-Müller
- Succeeded by: Gunnar Garbo

Personal details
- Born: 11 October 1902 Holme Municipality, Norway
- Died: 31 October 1981 (aged 79)
- Party: Liberal (formerly); Liberal People's

Bent Røiseland (11 October 1902 – 31 October 1981) was a Norwegian politician for the Liberal Party and later the Liberal People's Party.

He was elected to the Norwegian Parliament from Vest-Agder in 1945, and was re-elected on six occasions. He was President of the Lagting for three terms. During his seventh term, in December 1972, Røiseland joined the Liberal People's Party which split from the Liberal Party over disagreements of Norway's proposed entry to the European Economic Community.

On the local level, Røiseland was a member of the municipal council of Holum Municipality between 1931 and 1940.

He was born in Holme Municipality (later spelled Holum). Outside politics he mainly worked as a farmer. He was a member of the Diocese Council of Agder from 1958 to 1965, and was an auditor-general at the Office of the Auditor General of Norway from 1954 to 1973.

Party political offices
Preceded by Jacob S. Worm-Müller	Leader of the Liberal Party of Norway; 1952–1964	Succeeded by Gunnar Garbo
