= John Lyng =

Norwegian politician (1905–1978)

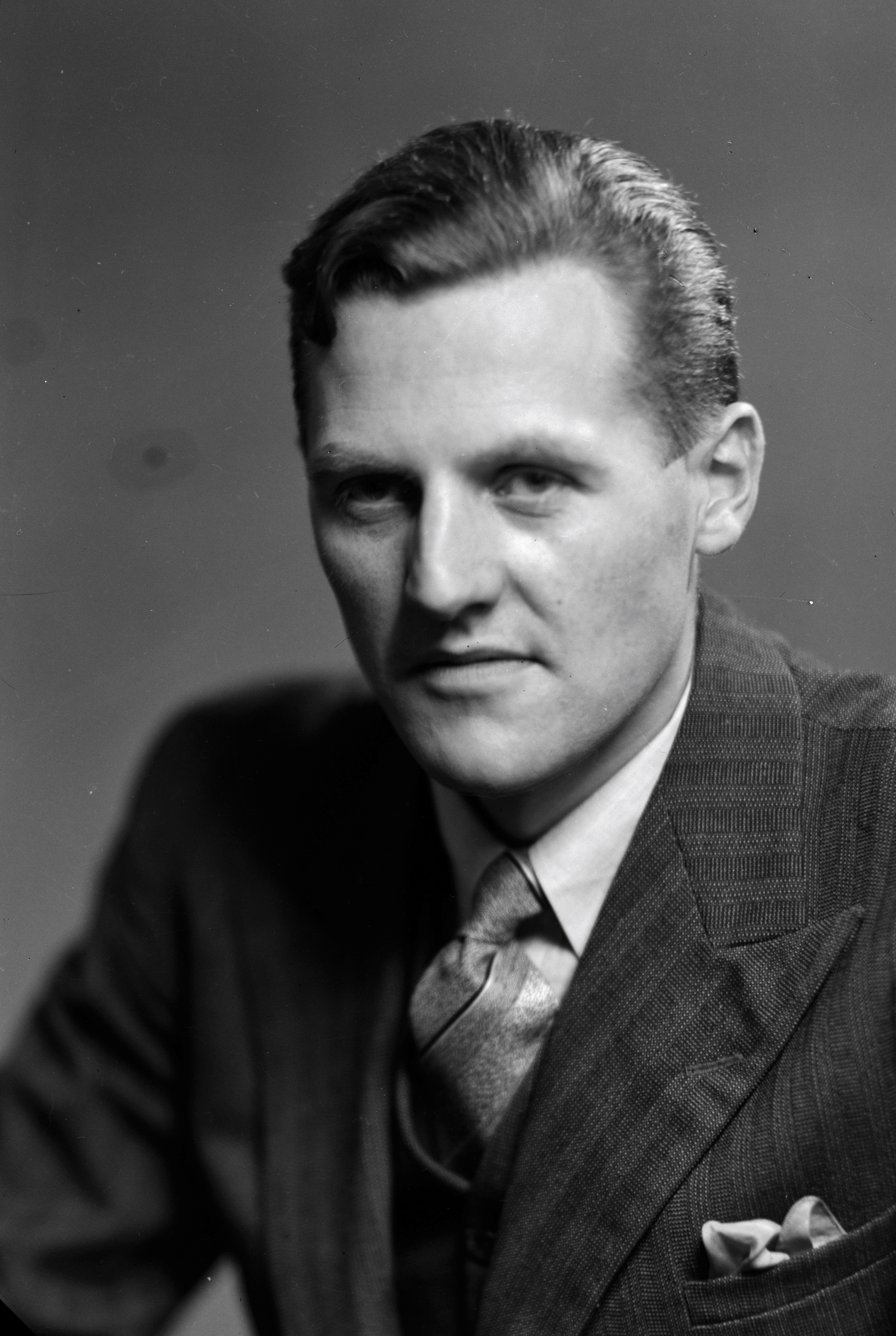
- Lyng in 1937

Prime Minister of Norway
- In office 28 August 1963 – 25 September 1963
- Monarch: Olav V
- Preceded by: Einar Gerhardsen
- Succeeded by: Einar Gerhardsen

Minister of Foreign Affairs
- In office 12 October 1965 – 22 May 1970 (4 years, 222 days)
- Prime Minister: Per Borten
- Preceded by: Halvard Lange
- Succeeded by: Svenn Stray

County Governor of Oslo and Akershus
- In office 1 October 1964 – 1 October 1965
- Preceded by: Trygve Lie
- Succeeded by: Petter Mørch Koren

Conservative Parliamentary Leader
- In office 1 October 1958 – 30 September 1965
- Preceded by: C. J. Hambro
- Succeeded by: Svenn Stray

Member of the Norwegian Parliament
- In office 1 January 1958 – 30 September 1965
- Constituency: Akershus
- In office 4 December 1945 – 31 December 1953
- Preceded by: Harald Torp
- Constituency: Trondheim and Levanger

Personal details
- Born: John Johan Daniel Fürstenberg Lyng; 22 August 1905 Trondheim, Norway
- Died: 18 January 1978 (aged 72) Bærum, Akershus, Norway
- Party: Conservative (1938–78); Free-minded Liberal Party (1934–38)
- Education: University of Oslo
- Profession: Lawyer

John Daniel Lyng (22 August 1905 – 18 January 1978) was a Norwegian politician from the Conservative Party. He was the prime minister of Norway from 28 August to 25 September 1963 in a coalition government consisting of the Conservative, Centre, Christian Democratic, and Liberal parties. It was the first government in 28 years that was not headed by the Labour Party.

== Early life ==
Lyng was born in Trondheim to merchant Markus Hartman Lyng (1872–1938) and Martha Maria Helberg (1885–1959), and graduated with the cand.jur. degree in 1927. He studied in Oslo, Copenhagen, and Heidelberg in 1931. During his student years, Lyng was active in the leftist Mot Dag student grouping, and his time in Weimar Germany in the early 1930s gave him a strong dislike of totalitarian movements as Nazism was on the rise there. Before and after World War II he worked as a lawyer and a judge.

He joined the Norwegian resistance movement during the occupation of Norway by Nazi Germany. He raised the mountain cabin Skardøla in Sylene, about 50 metres from the Norway-Sweden border, which was used as an outpost by resistance fighters such as Odd Sørli, Johnny Pevik, and Nils Uhlin Hansen. Lyng later fled the country, and worked in the Norwegian legation in Stockholm's law office from 1943 to 1944, and in the Norwegian government administration-in-exile in London until 1945.

== Political career ==
Lyng was originally a member of the Free-minded Liberal Party, heading the local party chapter from 1934 to 1935. He was a member of the executive committee of Trondheim city council from 1934 to 1940 and in 1945, but had changed to the Conservative Party in 1938, heading the party chapter in Trondheim until 1947. Lyng was elected to the Norwegian Parliament from the Market towns of Sør-Trøndelag and Nord-Trøndelag counties in 1945, and was re-elected in 1949. He was then out of parliament for one term, before being elected again in 1957 and in 1961, this time from Akershus, and was elected leader of the Conservative Party's parliamentary group. From 1955 to 1959 he was a member of the municipal council of Skien Municipality.

His brief stint as Prime Minister came in August 1963 after the two representatives from the Socialist People's Party (SF) joined a slim 76–74 no confidence vote against the cabinet Gerhardsen following the Kings Bay Affair, a series of mining accidents at Ny-Ålesund. Lyng quickly realised that between them, the non-socialist parties were only one seat short of a majority in the Storting, and that if they banded together, they would be able to form a government as long as the SF abstained. He quickly pulled together a coalition which took office on 28 August. The socialist vote of no confidence was merely a protest and demonstration, and the Labour cabinet was restored a month later after the SF threw its support back to Labour. While Lyng was Prime Minister Ebba Haslund took his seat in parliament.

Although the cabinet Lyng only lasted a month, it proved that the non-socialist parties were capable of forming a government. Following the 1965 elections the non-socialist parties won a majority with Per Borten as Prime Minister, and John Lyng as Minister of Foreign Affairs. He was replaced by Svenn Stray in 1970.

Lyng held the post of County Governor of Oslo and Akershus from 1964 to 1965. He is also remembered for pursuing Norwegian membership in the EEC.

== Personal life ==
He married physician Gisela Gerda Margarete Lutz (1907–1941) in 1932. They were divorced in 1940. In 1944 he married lawyer Liv Godager (1918–1989). His cousin was the widely renowned adventurer Thor Heyerdahl.

Lyng spent his later years writing his memoirs. He died in 1978, after being diagnosed with cancer the preceding year.

Political offices
Preceded by Einar Gerhardsen	Prime Minister of Norway; August 1963–September 1963	Succeeded by Einar Gerhardsen
Preceded by Halvard Manthey Lange	Minister of Foreign Affairs; 1965–1970	Succeeded by Svenn Stray
Preceded by Trygve Lie	County Governor of Oslo and Akershus; 1964–1965	Succeeded by Petter Mørch Koren
