= 1915 in Norway =

- Centuries: 18th; 19th; 20th; 21st
- Decades: 1890s; 1900s; 1910s; 1920s; 1930s
- See also: List of years in Norway

Events in the year 1915 in Norway.

== Incumbents ==
- Monarch – Haakon VII.

== Events ==
- 20 May - The Bastøy Boys' Home Insurrection.
- 21 October - The 1915 Parliamentary election takes place.
- The present Lindesnes Lighthouse was built.

== Popular culture ==
=== Literature ===
- The Knut Hamsund novel Segelfoss By Volume 1 & 2 (Segelfoss Town), was published.
- The Olav Duun novel Harald was published.

== Notable births ==
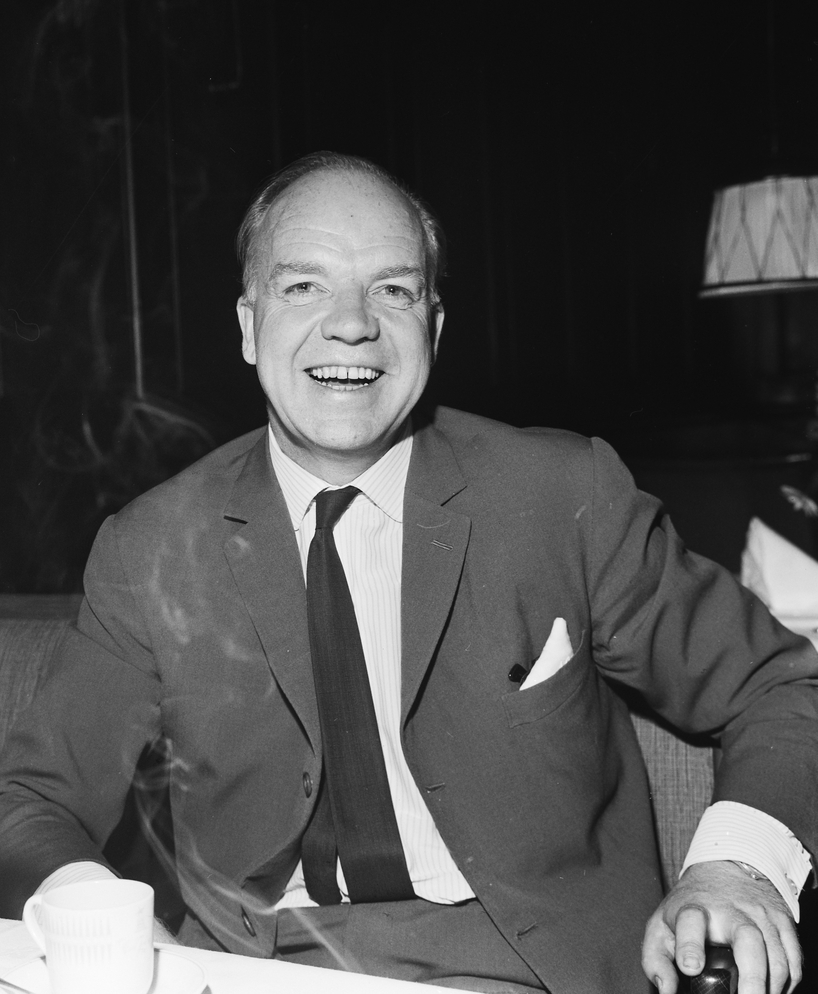
Henki Kolstad

- 16 January – Aase Bjerkholt, politician (died 2012)
- 19 January – Håkon Kyllingmark, politician and minister (died 2003)
- 25 January – Sverre L. Mo, politician (died 2002)
- 31 January – Andreas Zeier Cappelen, politician (died 2008).
- 3 February – Henki Kolstad, actor (died 2008).
- 14 February – Idar Norstrand, civil servant and politician (died 1986)
- 8 March – Odd Hilt, sculptor (died 1986).
- 9 March – Kåre Grøndahl Hagem, politician (died 2008)
- 13 March – Eva Scheer, journalist, literary critic, translator and author (died 1999).
- 22 March – Erling Asbjørn Kongshaug, rifle shooter, Olympic gold medallist and multiple World Champion (died 1993)
- 28 March – Odd Vigestad, politician (died 1999)
- 31 March – Bergfrid Fjose, politician and minister (died 2004)
- 21 April – Oddmund Myklebust, politician and minister (died 1972)
- 8 May – Arvid Fladmoe, composer and conductor (died 1993)
- 10 May – Kristian Lien, politician (died 1996)
- 12 May – Olav Askvik, politician (died 2011)
- 15 May – Jens Christian Hauge, resistance member and politician (died 2006)
- 5 June – John Engh, architect (died 1996)
- 5 June – Hilmar Myhra, ski jumper (died 2013)
- 8 June – Knut Haus, politician (died 2006)
- 23 June – Jens Bolling, actor and theatre director (died 1992)
- 1 July – Rolf Hauge, army officer (died 1989)
- 2 July – Georg Krog, speed skater and Olympic silver medallist (died 1991)
- 9 July – Arvid Storsveen, intelligence officer (died 1943)
- 23 July – Olai Ingemar Eikeland, politician (died 2003)
- 15 August – Per Sonerud, politician (died 1993)
- 16 August – Odd Lien, newspaper editor and politician (died 2002)
- 19 August – Erling Kaas, pole vaulter (died 1996)
- 29 August – Einar Tufte-Johnsen, aviation officer (d. 1985).
- 3 September – Knut Nystedt, composer (died 2014)
- 24 September – Knut Schmidt-Nielsen, comparative physiologist (died 2007)
- 30 September – Wilhelm Bøe, organizational leader (died 1980).
- 17 October – Alfred Hauge, novelist, poet and historian (died 1986)
- 22 October – Per Karstensen, politician (died 2010)
- 6 November – Olav Berkaak, novelist (died 1980).
- 11 November – Carl Fredrik Engelstad, writer, playwright, journalist, translator and theatre director (died 1996)
- 29 November – Erik Stai, high jumper (died 2004)
- 9 December – Arnt Eliassen, meteorologist (died 2000)
- 13 December – Magne Skodvin, historian (died 2004)
- 15 December – Odd Aukrust, economist (died 2008).
- 31 December – Olaf Knudson, politician (died 1996)

=== Full date missing ===
- Alf-Jørgen Aas, painter (died 1981)
- Astrid Hjertenæs Andersen, poet and travel writer (died 1985)
- Johan Hambro, journalist (died 1993)
- Rein Henriksen, lawyer and industrialist (died 1994)
- Johan Berthin Holte, businessperson (died 2002)
- Agnar Mykle, author (died 1994)
- Rasmus Nordbø, politician and minister (died 1983)

== Notable deaths ==
- 29 January – Ole Andres Olsen, Seventh-day Adventist minister and administrator (born 1845)
- 15 April – Christian Andreas Irgens, politician (born 1833)
- 28 April – Vilhelmine Ullmann, proponent for women's rights (born 1816).
- 31 May – Lars Holst, journalist, newspaper editor and politician (born 1848).
- 28 July – Christopher Knudsen, priest, politician and minister (born 1843)
- 12 August – Haakon Ditlev Lowzow, military officer, politician and minister (born 1854)

=== Full date unknown ===
- Knud Knudsen, photographer (born 1832)
- Henrik Nissen, architect (born 1848)
- Christian Wilhelm Engel Bredal Olssøn, politician and minister (born 1844)
- Karl Ditlev Rygh, archaeologist and politician (born 1839)
