= 2004 in Norway =

Events in the year 2004 in Norway.

== Incumbents ==
- Monarch: Harald V.
- Regent: Haakon: from 25 November 2003 to 12 April 2004 (during the King's treatment for cancer and the subsequent convalescence period)
- Prime Minister: Kjell Magne Bondevik (Christian Democratic Party)

== Events ==
=== January ===
- 1 January – Innovation Norway is established, replacing four Norwegian governmental organisations.
- 19 January – The freighter MS Rocknes capsizes in Vatlestraumen. 18 people die.

=== March ===
- 26 March – Norsk Hydro's fertilizer business was spun off as a separately stock-listed company under the name of Yara International.
- 4 April – NOKAS robbery: the NOKAS teller central in Stavanger was robbed. The outcome of the robbery was approximately NOK 57,4 million (approx. US$9.3 million), making it the largest robbery in Norwegian history. A policeman was shot and killed during the robbery.

=== June ===
- 15 June – The Norwegian Directorate for Education and Training is created.
- 20 June – The first edition of Skolelinux is released.

=== July ===
- July – Leona Johansson and Tommy Hol Ellingsen, the founders of environmental organization Fuck for Forest, had intercourse on stage at the Quart Festival during the performance by Kristopher Schau and his band, The Cumshots to raise awareness for the deforestation issue, resulting in a fine for the organization.

=== August ===
- 22 August – Armed robbers steal Edvard Munch's The Scream, Madonna, and other paintings from the Munch Museum in Oslo, Norway.

=== December ===
- 26 December – 84 Norwegian people are among thousands of people killed by the 2004 Indian Ocean tsunami, including Norwegian jazz musician Sigurd Køhn.

== Popular culture ==
=== Music ===
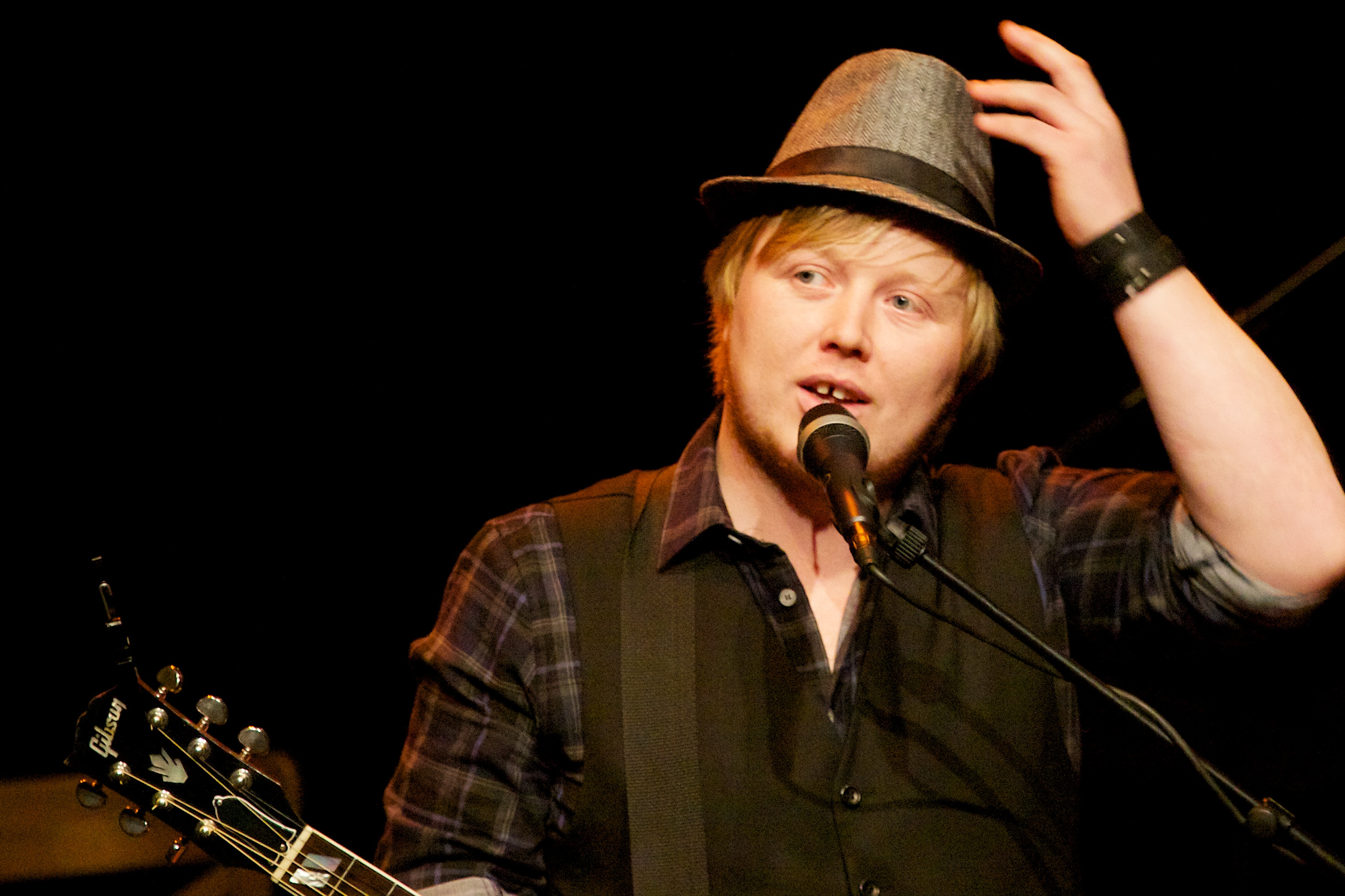
Kurt Nilsen wins the World Idol competition on 1 January.

- 1 January – The Norwegian pop/country singer Kurt Nilsen, whom won the first season of the Norwegian version of the reality television show Pop Idol in May 2003, wins the World Idol competition which was a one-off international version of Pop Idol featuring winners of the various national Idol shows.
- 6 March – Selection of the participant for Norway in the Eurovision Song Contest 2004.
- 20 July – Maria Mena performs "You're the Only One" on Late Show with David Letterman.

== Notable births ==
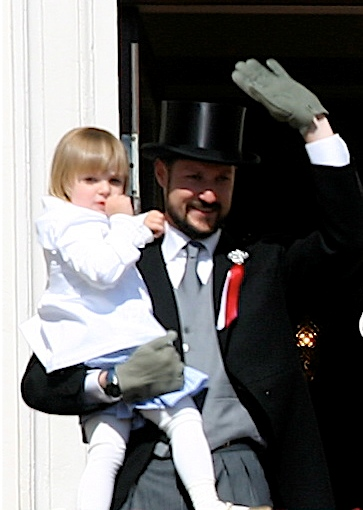
Princess Ingrid Alexandra with her father on 17 May 2007

- 21 January – Princess Ingrid Alexandra of Norway, the daughter of Crown Prince Haakon of Norway and second in the line of succession to the Norwegian throne.

== Notable deaths ==
- 13 January – Arne Næss, Jr., businessman and mountaineer (born 1937)
- 29 January – Helge Seip, politician (born 1919)
- 8 February – Kristian Henriksen, international soccer player, coach (born 1911)
- 10 February – Nils Aas, sculptor (born 1933)
- 15 February – Jens Evensen, lawyer, judge, politician and Minister (born 1917)
- 4 March – Erik Stai, high jumper (born 1915)
- 13 March – Guttorm Berge, alpine skier and Olympic bronze medallist (born 1929)
- 18 March – Jostein Nerbøvik, historian (born 1938)
- 27 March – Einar Magnussen, economist and politician (born 1931)
- 10 April – Odd Wang Sørensen, international soccer player (born 1922)
- 25 April – Thorbjørn Kultorp, politician (born 1929)
- 6 May – Kjell Hallbing, author of Western books under the pseudonym Louis Masterson (born 1934)
- 11 May – Per Øyvind Heradstveit, television journalist (born 1932).
- 13 May – Kjell Bækkelund, pianist (born 1930)
- 13 May – Magnar Estenstad, cross country skier and double Olympic medallist (born 1924)
- 13 May – Bergfrid Fjose, politician and Minister (born 1915)
- 30 May – Leif Lund, politician (born 1942)
- 1 June – Randi Brænne, actress (born 1911).
- 2 June – Egil Tynæs, medical doctor, killed in Afghanistan (born 1941)
- 23 June – Tor Aspengren, trade unionist (born 1917)
- 25 June – Carl Fredrik Wisløff, theologian and Christian preacher (born 1908)
- 13 July – Tore A. Liltved, politician (born 1939)
- 17 July – Paul Hilmar Jenson, philatelist (born 1930)
- 21 July – Oddbjørn Sverre Langlo, politician (born 1935)
- 3 August – Steinar Hansson, journalist and newspaper editor (born 1947).
- 31 August – Edvin Landsem, cross country skier (born 1925)
- 13 October – Erik Bye, journalist, artist and radio and television personality (born 1926)
- 3 November – Eilert Dahl, Nordic skier (born 1919)
- 14 November – Petter Mørch Koren, politician and Minister (born 1910)
- 14 November – Harald Kråkenes, rower and Olympic bronze medallist (born 1925)
- 18 November – Kolbjørn Stordrange, politician (born 1924)
- 24 November – Mette Janson, journalist (born 1934).
- 4 December – Oscar Olsen, politician (born 1908)
- 5 December – Øystein Rottem, philologist, literary historian and literary critic (born 1946).
- 12 December – Reidar Alveberg, bobsledder (born 1916)
- 18 December – Albert Nordengen, politician (born 1923)
- 21 December – Arild Nyquist, novelist, poet, children's writer and musician (born 1937).
- 24 December – Per Fossum, alpine skier (born 1910).

=== Full date unknown ===
- Petter Jakob Bjerve, politician and Minister (born 1913)
- Finn Carling, novelist, playwright, poet and essayist (born 1925)
- Einar Førde, politician and Minister (born 1943)
- Sivert Andreas Nielsen, civil servant, banker and politician (born 1916)
- Magne Skodvin, historian (born 1915)
