= Fourth Gerhardsen cabinet =

Government of Norway from 1963 to 1965

Gerhardsen's Fourth Cabinet
- Cabinet of Norway

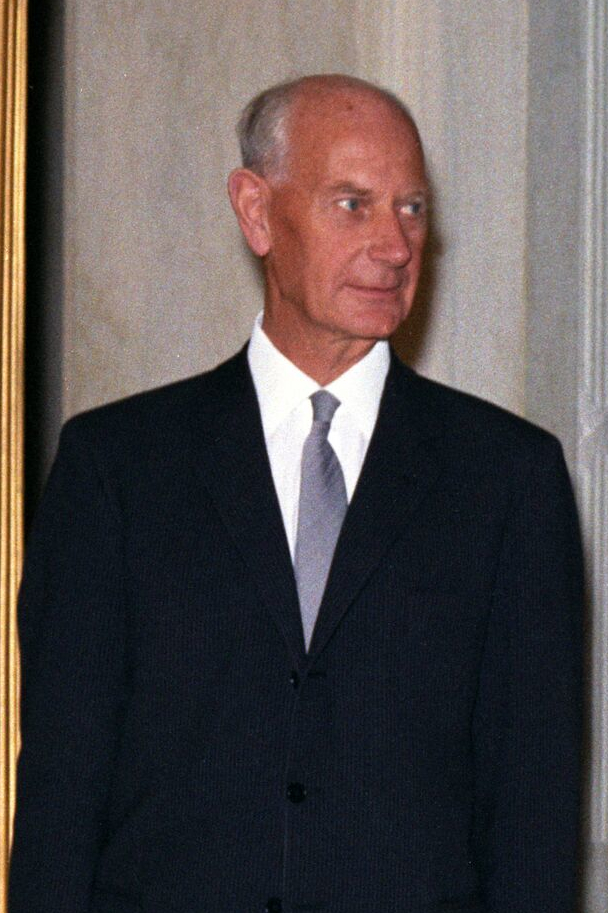
- Date formed: 25 September 1963
- Date dissolved: 12 October 1965

People and organisations
- King: Olav V of Norway
- Prime Minister: Einar Gerhardsen
- No. of ministers: 15
- Member party: Labour Party
- Status in legislature: Minority government

History
- Outgoing formation: 1965 parliamentary election
- Election: 1961 parliamentary election
- Legislature term: 1961-1965
- Predecessor: Lyng's Cabinet
- Successor: Borten's Cabinet

Gerhardsen's Fourth Cabinet governed Norway between 25 September 1963 and 12 October 1965. The Labour Party cabinet was led by Einar Gerhardsen. It had the following composition:

== Cabinet members ==
Cabinet
Portfolio	Minister	Took office	Left office	Party
Prime Minister	Einar Gerhardsen	25 September 1963	12 October 1965	Labour
Minister of Foreign Affairs	Halvard Lange	25 September 1963	12 October 1965	Labour
Minister of Finance and Customs	Andreas Z. Cappelen	25 September 1963	12 October 1965	Labour
Minister of Defence	Gudmund Harlem	25 September 1963	12 October 1965	Labour
Minister of Justice and the Police	O. C. Gundersen	25 September 1963	12 October 1965	Labour
Minister of Transport and Communications	Trygve Bratteli	25 September 1963	20 January 1964	Labour
Minister of Transport and Communications	Erik Himle	20 January 1964	12 October 1965	Labour
Minister of Family and Consumer Affairs	Aase Bjerkholt	25 September 1963	12 October 1965	Labour
Minister of Local Government and Labour	Jens Haugland	25 September 1963	12 October 1965	Labour
Minister of Education and Church Affairs	Helge Sivertsen	25 September 1963	12 October 1965	Labour
Minister of Social Affairs	Olav Gjærevoll	25 September 1963	12 October 1965	Labour
Minister of Pay and Prices	Karl Trasti	25 September 1963	20 January 1964	Labour
Minister of Pay and Prices	Idar Norstrand	20 January 1964	12 October 1965	Labour
Minister of Agriculture	Leif Granli	25 September 1963	12 October 1965	Labour
Minister of Industry	Trygve Lie	25 September 1963	20 January 1964	Labour
Minister of Industry	Karl Trasti	20 January 1964	12 October 1965	Labour
Minister of Trade and Shipping	Erik Himle	25 September 1963	20 January 1964	Labour
Minister of Trade and Shipping	Trygve Lie	20 January 1964	12 October 1965	Labour
Minister of Fisheries	Magnus Andersen	25 September 1963	12 October 1965	Labour

== State Secretaries ==
Ministry	State Secretary	Period (Note: Unless otherwise noted, the period was 25 September 1963 - 12 October 1965.)	Party
Office of the Prime Minister	Olaf Solumsmoen		Labour
Office of the Prime Minister	Dagfin Juel		Labour
Office of the Prime Minister	Kjell Gjøstein Aabrek	– 25 September 1965	Labour
Ministry of Foreign Affairs	Jens Mogens Boyesen	15 January 1964 –	Labour
Ministry of Finance	Per Dragland	10 February 1964 –	Labour
Ministry of Industry	Reidar Alfred Melien	27 September 1963 –	Labour
Ministry of Local Government and Labour	Ingvald Ulveseth	1 February 1964 – 31 July 1965	Labour
Ministry of Local Government and Labour	Brynjulv Sjetne	1 August 1965 –	Labour
Ministry of Social Affairs	Bjørn Skau		Labour
Ministry of Transport and Communications	Erik Andreas Ribu	1 February 1964 –	Labour
Ministry of Fisheries	Trygve Hoem	1 February 1964 –	Labour
Ministry of Agriculture	Oskar Øksnes	1 June 1964 –	Labour
Ministry of Church Affairs and Education	Enevald Skadsem	– 24 January 1965	Labour
Ministry of Church Affairs and Education	Tønnes Andenæs	15 January 1965 –	Labour
