= Bjørn Skau =

Norwegian politician (1929–2013)

Minister of Justice
- In office 4 February 1981 – 14 October 1981
- Prime Minister: Gro Harlem Brundtland
- Preceded by: Oddvar Berrefjord
- Succeeded by: Mona Røkke

State Secretary for the Ministry of Social Affairs
- In office 27 September 1963 – 12 October 1965
- Prime Minister: Einar Gerhardsen
- Minister: Olav Gjærevoll
- In office 15 December 1961 – 28 August 1963
- Prime Minister: Einar Gerhardsen
- Minister: Olav Bruvik; Olav Gjærevoll

Personal details
- Born: 26 February 1929 Horten Municipality, Vestfold, Norway
- Died: 2 March 2013 (aged 84) Fredrikstad Municipality, Østfold, Norway
- Party: Labour
- Spouse: Iris Skau
- Children: Per Skau

Bjørn Skau (26 February 1929 – 2 March 2013) was a Norwegian politician for the Labour Party.

Skau was born in Borre Municipality. In 1959, during the third cabinet Gerhardsen, he was appointed personal secretary (today known as political advisor) in the Ministry of Social Affairs. He was promoted to state secretary in 1961, but lost the position temporarily in 1963, when the cabinet Lyng held office. When the fourth cabinet Gerhardsen held office from 1963 to 1965, Skau was again state secretary. During the short-lived first cabinet Brundtland in 1981, Skau was appointed Minister of Justice and the Police.

On the local level he was a member of the municipal council of Larvik Municipality from 1951 to 1957 and of the executive committee of the municipal council of Drammen Municipality from 1983 to 1987. He chaired the party chapter in Buskerud county from 1981 to 1986.

Skau also headed the health administration in Buskerud from 1978 to 1986, and then became director of Buskerud Central Hospital, a post he held until 1993. A member of the temperance movement, he led the Norwegian branch of the International Organisation of Good Templars from 1991 to 1997.

Bjørn Skau died in Fredrikstad on 2 March 2013, at the age of 84. His sister was the acclaimed Norwegian missionary Annie Skau Berntsen.

Political offices
Preceded by Oddvar Berrefjord	Minister of Justice and the Police (Norway); February – October 1981	Succeeded by Mona Røkke
