= Third Gerhardsen cabinet =

Government of Norway from 1955 to 1963

Gerhardsen's Third Cabinet
- Cabinet of Norway

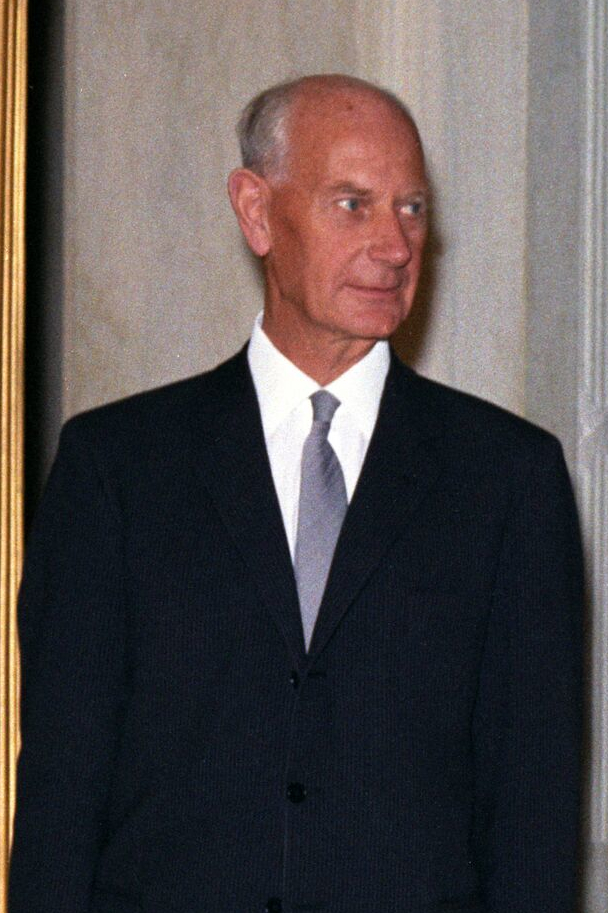
- Date formed: 22 January 1955
- Date dissolved: 28 August 1963

People and organisations
- King: Haakon VII of Norway; Olav V of Norway
- Prime Minister: Einar Gerhardsen
- No. of ministers: 15
- Member party: Labour Party
- Status in legislature: Majority

History
- Elections: 1957; 1961
- Legislature terms: 1957–1961; 1961–1965
- Predecessor: Torp's Cabinet
- Successor: Lyng's Cabinet

Gerhardsen's Third Cabinet was the cabinet of Norway from 22 January 1955 to 28 August 1963. The government was led by Prime Minister Einar Gerhardsen, marking his third term in said role. The cabinet was defeated in a motion of no-confidence in 1963 following the Kings Bay affair.

== Cabinet members ==
Cabinet
| Portfolio | Minister | Took office | Left office | Party |
|---|---|---|---|---|
| Prime Minister | Einar Gerhardsen | 22 January 1955 | 28 August 1963 | Labour |
| Minister of Foreign Affairs | Halvard Lange | 22 January 1955 | 28 August 1963 | Labour |
| Minister of Justice and the Police | Jens Christian Hauge | 22 January 1955 | 1 November 1955 | Labour |
| Minister of Justice and the Police | Jens Haugland | 1 November 1955 | 28 August 1963 | Labour |
| Minister of Local Government and Labour | Ulrik Olsen | 22 January 1955 | 1 September 1958 | Labour |
| Minister of Local Government and Labour | Andreas Z. Cappelen | 1 September 1958 | 4 February 1963 | Labour |
| Minister of Local Government and Labour | Oskar Skogly | 4 February 1963 | 28 August 1963 | Labour |
| Minister of Defence | Nils Handal | 22 January 1955 | 18 February 1961 | Labour |
| Minister of Defence | Gudmund Harlem | 18 February 1961 | 28 August 1963 | Labour |
| Minister of Social Affairs | Rakel Seweriin | 22 January 1955 | 1 August 1955 | Labour |
| Minister of Social Affairs | Gudmund Harlem | 1 August 1955 | 18 February 1961 | Labour |
| Minister of Social Affairs | Olav Bruvik | 18 February 1961 | 30 December 1962 | Labour |
| Minister of Social Affairs | Aase Bjerkholt (acting) | 30 December 1962 | 4 February 1963 | Labour |
| Minister of Social Affairs | Olav Gjærevoll | 4 February 1963 | 28 August 1963 | Labour |
| Minister of Education and Church Affairs | Birger Bergersen | 22 January 1955 | 23 April 1960 | Labour |
| Minister of Education and Church Affairs | Helge Sivertsen | 23 April 1960 | 28 August 1963 | Labour |
| Minister of Industry | Gustav Sjaastad | 22 January 1955 | 9 April 1959 | Labour |
| Minister of Industry | Kjell Holler | 9 April 1959 | 4 July 1963 | Labour |
| Minister of Industry | Trygve Lie | 4 July 1963 | 28 August 1963 | Labour |
| Minister of Agriculture | Olav Meisdalshagen | 22 January 1955 | 14 May 1956 | Labour |
| Minister of Agriculture | Harald J. Løbak | 14 May 1956 | 23 April 1960 | Labour |
| Minister of Agriculture | Einar Wøhni | 23 April 1960 | 28 August 1963 | Labour |
| Minister of Trade and Shipping | Arne Skaug | 22 January 1955 | 13 January 1962 | Labour |
| Minister of Trade and Shipping | O.C. Gundersen | 13 January 1962 | 28 August 1963 | Labour |
| Minister of Fisheries | Nils Lysø | 22 January 1955 | 28 August 1963 | Labour |
| Minister of Transport and Communications | Kolbjørn Varmann | 22 January 1955 | 23 April 1960 | Labour |
| Minister of Transport and Communications | Trygve Bratteli | 23 April 1960 | 28 August 1963 | Labour |
| Minister of Finance and Customs | Mons Lid | 22 January 1955 | 28 December 1956 | Labour |
| Minister of Finance and Customs | Trygve Bratteli | 28 December 1956 | 23 April 1960 | Labour |
| Minister of Finance and Customs | Petter Jakob Bjerve | 23 April 1960 | 4 February 1963 | Labour |
| Minister of Finance and Customs | Andreas Z. Cappelen | 4 February 1963 | 28 August 1963 | Labour |
| Minister of Family and Consumer Affairs | Aase Bjerkholt | 1 August 1955 | 28 August 1963 | Labour |
| Minister of Pay and Prices | Gunnar Bråthen | 1 August 1955 | 9 April 1959 | Labour |
| Minister of Pay and Prices | Gunnar Bøe | 9 April 1959 | 1 September 1962 | Labour |
| Minister of Pay and Prices | Karl Trasti | 1 September 1962 | 28 August 1963 | Labour |

== State Secretaries ==
| Ministry | State Secretary | Period (Note: Unless otherwise noted, the period was 22 January 1955 - 28 August 1963.) | Party |
|---|---|---|---|
| Office of the Prime Minister | Kai Knudsen | 23 January 1955 – 31 December 1955 | Labour |
| Office of the Prime Minister | Olaf Solumsmoen | 6 January 1956 – | Labour |
| Office of the Prime Minister | Arnfinn Guldvog | 6 January 1956 – | Labour |
| Office of the Prime Minister | Dagfin Juel | 1 April 1956 – | Labour |
| Office of the Prime Minister | Kjell Gjøstein Aabrek | 1 January 1958 – | Labour |
| Ministry of Foreign Affairs | Dag Ramsøy Bryn | – 30 April 1958 | Labour |
| Ministry of Foreign Affairs | Hans Engen | 1 August 1958 – | Labour |
| Ministry of Finance | Karl Trasti | – 28 December 1956 | Labour |
| Ministry of Finance | Per Kleppe | 25 February 1957 – 1 March 1962 | Labour |
| Minister of Defence | Sivert Andreas Nielsen | 1 August 1955 – 31 July 1958 | Labour |
| Minister of Defence | Erik Himle | 1 July 1958 – 17 February 1961 | Labour |
| Ministry of Industry | Odd Gøthe | – 31 August 1958 | Labour |
| Ministry of Social Affairs | Bjørn Skau | 15 December 1961 – | Labour |
| Ministry of Transport and Communications | Halvard Lange Bojer | 1 September 1956 – 1 May 1960 | Labour |
| Ministry of Transport and Communications | Robert Nordén | 15 August 1960 – 6 January 1961 | Labour |
| Ministry of Transport and Communications | Erik Himle | 1 January 1962 – | Labour |
| Ministry of Fisheries | Olaf Marcelius Grønaas | – 4 May 1960 | Labour |
| Ministry of Fisheries | Finn Bryhni | 15 June 1960 – 5 January 1962 | |
| Ministry of Agriculture | Thorstein Treholt | – 1 September 1957 | Labour |
| Ministry of Church Affairs and Education | Helge Sivertsen | – 1 December 1956 | Labour |
| Ministry of Church Affairs and Education | Enevald Skadsem | 2 September 1960 – | Labour |
