= Gudmund Harlem =

Norwegian physician and politician

Minister of Defence
- In office 25 September 1963 – 12 October 1965
- Prime Minister: Einar Gerhardsen
- Preceded by: Håkon Kyllingmark
- Succeeded by: Otto G. Tidemand
- In office 18 February 1961 – 28 August 1963
- Prime Minister: Einar Gerhardsen
- Preceded by: Nils Handal
- Succeeded by: Håkon Kyllingmark

Minister of Social Affairs
- In office 1 August 1955 – 18 February 1961
- Prime Minister: Einar Gerhardsen
- Preceded by: Rakel Seweriin
- Succeeded by: Olav Bruvik

Personal details
- Born: 24 July 1917 Oslo, Norway
- Died: 22 March 1988 (aged 70) Oslo, Norway
- Party: Labour
- Spouse: Inga Margareta Elisabet Brynolf (m. 1938)
- Children: Gro, Erik, Lars and Hanne
- Parent(s): Gudmund Harlem (1885-1918), Olga Haug (1887-1942)

Gudmund Harlem (24 July 1917 – 22 March 1988) was a Norwegian physician and politician for the Labour Party. He was the Norwegian Minister of Social Affairs from 1955 to 1961 and Norwegian Minister of Defence from 1961 to 1965 (except for a short break from August to September 1963). As a physician he spent most of his career at Statens Attføringsinstitutt, serving as director from 1970 to 1977. He was then a professor at the Norwegian Institute of Technology and director of NTNF. He was the father of former Norwegian Prime Minister Gro Harlem Brundtland and former Norwegian Minister of Justice Hanne Harlem.

== Early life and political career ==
He was born in Kristiania as a son of Gudmund Harlem, Sr. (1885–1918) and Olga Haug (1887–1942). He finished his secondary education in 1935, enrolled as a student at the University of Oslo in the same year, and graduated with the cand.med. degree in 1946. He fled the country for Sweden in 1943 because of the German occupation, and stayed there until the end of World War II. In the autumn of 1945 he was the leader of the Norwegian Students' Society. He was hired as a physician at Statens Attføringsinstitutt in 1946, and was promoted to chief physician in 1953.

He also became involved in politics. He was a member of the revolutionary group Mot Dag from 1934 to its disestablishment in 1936, and then joined the Norwegian Labour Party and sat on the Oslo city council from 1945 to 1947, and of the school district board from 1948 to 1955. He was also a member of the central committee of the Workers' Youth League from 1946 to 1949, and of the International Union of Socialist Youth board from 1946 to 1951. From 1949 to 1957 he was a deputy member of the Labour Party's central committee; he was deputy chairman of the Oslo branch from 1952 to 1957.

== Later career ==
On 1 August 1955 he became Norwegian Minister of Social Affairs as a part of Gerhardsen's Third Cabinet. In February 1961 he was reshuffled to become Norwegian Minister of Defence. He held this position until August 1963, when John Lyng's short-lived Cabinet took over. The Lyng cabinet was toppled after only a month, and Harlem became Defence Minister once again from September 1963 to October 1965, when Per Borten's Cabinet took over.

After the end of his political career, Harlem returned to the Statens Attføringsinstitutt. He also doubled as assistant physician at Rikshospitalet from 1965 to 1966. In 1970 he was promoted to director of Statens Attføringsinstitutt, a position he held until 1977. He was a candidate to succeed Karl Evang as leader of the Norwegian Directorate for Health in 1972, but Torbjørn Mork was chosen. He took the Doctor of Medicine degree in 1976 with the thesis Studies on the Relation between Impairment, Disability and Dependency, and was a professor at the Norwegian Institute of Technology from 1977 to 1980. He rounded off his career as director of NTNF from 1980 to 1986, and then with two years as a general physician in Oslo. He died in March 1988.

Harlem was a member of the board of NAVF from 1949 to 1957, and chaired two special committees in the NTNF (on pollution from 1970 to 1976; on working environment from 1977 to 1980) before becoming director. He chaired the board of directors of the Norwegian School of Sport Sciences from 1976 to 1988 and the Norwegian Labour Inspection Authority from 1977 to 1988, and was the deputy chair of Rikshospitalet from 1970 to 1981 and the Financial Supervisory Authority of Norway from 1985 to 1988. He was engaged in the disability rights movement, and chaired the Sentralrådet for yrkesvalghemmede from 1955 to 1957 and 1966 to 1970. He was also president of the International Society for the Rehabilitation of the Disabled from 1966 to 1972.

== Personal ==
In 1938 he married Swedish citizen Inga Margareta Elisabet Brynolf (1918–2005), daughter of two lawyers. Their daughter Gro Harlem Brundtland, born 1939, became Prime Minister of Norway (1980–1981, 1986–1989, 1990–1996) and Director-General of the World Health Organization (1998–2003). A much younger daughter Hanne Harlem, born 1964, has been Minister of Justice (2000–2001).

Political offices
Preceded by Rakel Seweriin	Norwegian Minister of Social Affairs; 1955–1961	Succeeded by Olav Bruvik
Preceded by Nils Handal	Norwegian Minister of Defence; 1961–August 1963	Succeeded by Håkon Kyllingmark
Preceded by Håkon Kyllingmark	Norwegian Minister of Defence; September 1963–1965	Succeeded by Otto Grieg Tidemand
