= Ramsøy =

Ramsøy is a surname. Notable people with the surname include:

- Alf Ramsøy, Norwegian footballer
- Christina Ramsøy, Norwegian politician
- Dag Ramsøy Bryn (1909–1991), Norwegian diplomat and politician
