= Kjell Gjøstein Aabrek =

Norwegian politician (1901–1967)

Kjell Aabrek
- Born: Kjell Gjøstein Aabrek; May 3, 1901
- Died: December 30, 1967 (aged 66)
- Political party: Labour Party

Kjell Gjøstein Aabrek (3 May 1901 – 30 December 1967) was a Norwegian politician for the Labour Party.

He was born in Bergen.

He was elected to the Norwegian Parliament from Bergen in 1954. He had served the term 1950–1953 as a deputy representative, but was promoted to regular representative from 1951 because Nils Langhelle was appointed to the second cabinet, Gerhardsen. On the local level, he was a member of the city council of Bergen from 1928 to 1930 and 1945 to 1951. He chaired the local party chapter from 1948 to 1951.

In 1958, during the third cabinet Gerhardsen, he was appointed state secretary in the Office of the Prime Minister. He lost the position temporarily in 1963, when the cabinet Lyng held office, but when the fourth cabinet Gerhardsen held office from 1963 to 1965, Aabrek was again state secretary.

Outside politics, he graduated with the cand.philol. degree in 1926 and worked as a teacher in Skien, Narvik and Bergen.
