= Nils Peter Laberg Heitman =

Norwegian physician and civil servant

Nils Peter Laberg Heitman (1874–1938) was a Norwegian physician and civil servant.

He was born in Bergen, Norway and graduated with the cand.med. degree in 1900. He was a chief physician from 1914, and was the director of the Norwegian Directorate for Medicine (Statens helsetilsyn) from 1930 to 1938.

Civic offices
Preceded by vacant	Director of the Norwegian Directorate for Medicine; 1930–1938	Succeeded by Karl Evang
