= Johannes Dannevig =

Norwegian jurist and civil servant

Johannes Dannevig (1902 – 1977) was a Norwegian jurist and civil servant.

He graduated with the cand.jur. degree in 1926, and worked as a deputy judge from 1927 to 1929. In 1931 he was hired in the Ministry of Finance, advancing to assistant secretary. From 1940 he headed the county tax collection office in Ålesund. From 1946 to 1957 he was the acting director of the Norwegian Customs Authority. He then applied to become deputy under-secretary of state in the Ministry of Finance, while Karl Trasti applied for the position as customs director. After one year as deputy under-secretary of state, Dannevig served as stipendiary magistrate (byfogd) of Oslo from 1958 to 1971.
