= Leif Kolflaath =

Norwegian politician

Leif Kolflaath (17 February 1927 – 15 December 2001) was a Norwegian politician from the Conservative Party. He was born in Narvik.

Kolflaath was never elected directly to the Norwegian Parliament to represent Nordland, but he served as a deputy representative during the periods 1961–1965, 1965–1969 and 1969–1973. During the second term he was brought in as a replacement representative for Håkon Kyllingmark, who was appointed to the Cabinet at that time, after Kyllingmark's original replacer Bodil Aakre formally moved up in the line of succession to replace Harald Warholm who died in February 1967. Kolflaath sat through that term and then returned to serve in deputy position.

On local level Kolflaath served on the municipal council of Narvik Municipality from 1954 to 1966. From 1958 to 1966 he was also a member of Nordland county council.
