= Norwegian Directorate for Health =

Norwegian Directorate for Health may refer to:

- From 2002 to 2008, the name of the Norwegian Directorate for Health and Social Affairs
- From 1945 to 1993, the name of the Norwegian Board of Health Supervision
