= Ogar (surname) =

Ogar is a surname. Notable people include:

- Jolanta Ogar (born 1982), Polish sailor
- Peter Ogar, Nigerian military administrator
- Petter Øgar (born 1953), Norwegian physician and civil servant
- Simon Ogar Veron (born 1987), Nigerian footballer
