= Lars Hanssen =

Lars Hanssen may refer to:

- Lars Hanssen (chess player) (1903–1940), Norwegian chess player
- Lars E. Hanssen (born 1949), Norwegian physician and civil servant
