= Anne Alvik =

Norwegian physician and civil servant

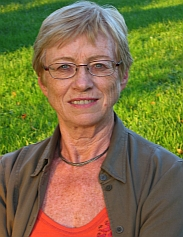
Anne Alvik.

Anne Alvik (born 7 May 1937) is a Norwegian physician and civil servant.

She was born in Namsos. She graduated with the cand.med. degree from the University of Oslo in 1962, and with a Master of Science degree in community medicine at the London School of Hygiene and Tropical Medicine in 1980. From 1977 to 1982 she was assisting chief physician in the Norwegian Directorate for Health, and from 1982 to 1985 she was assisting county physician in Akershus. In 1985 she became assisting director in the Directorate for Health, and in 1992 she was promoted to director. As of 1994 the Directorate for Health became the Norwegian Board of Health Supervision. She stepped down as director in 2000. She was first granted a six-month absence of leave in March; acting director was Petter Øgar. On 1 September the Council of State announced her stepping down, and Lars E. Hanssen became acting director.

She was a delegate to the Council of Europe Public Health Committee from 1988 to 1992, a board member of the World Health Organization from 1997 to 2000, and of the Norwegian Cancer Association. She has also been involved in the Norwegian Medical Association, the Research Council of Norway and Hovedkomitéen for norsk forskning. From 1975 to 1979 she was a member of the municipal council of Ås Municipality and Akershus county council for the Liberal People's Party; she was also a parliamentary secretary for the party from 1975 to 1976.

Civic offices
Preceded by Torbjørn Mork	Director of the Norwegian Board of Health Supervision; 1992–2000	Succeeded by Petter Øgar (acting)
