= Dagfin Juel =

Norwegian civil servant (1909–1985)

Dagfin Juel (23 February 1909 – 4 June 1985) was a Norwegian civil servant and politician for the Labour Party.

He graduated as Candidate, in 1932. He was hired in the Ministry of Social Affairs in 1938, and was later promoted to assistant secretary. He moved to the Ministry of Trade in 1949, and was promoted from assistant secretary to assistant director in 1954.

From 1956 to 1965, during the third and fourth cabinet Gerhardsen, Juel served as state secretary in the Office of the Prime Minister. The tenure was only interrupted by the cabinet Lyng administration for a month in 1963. After the fourth cabinet Gerhardsen fell in 1965, Juel continued his career as a civil servant.
