= Alveberg =

Alveberg is a Norwegian surname. Notable people with the surname include:

- Kjersti Alveberg (1948–2021), Norwegian choreographer and dancer
- Reidar Alveberg (1916–2004), Norwegian bobsledder
