= Sivert Andreas Nielsen =

Sivert Andreas Nielsen may refer to:

- Sivert Andreas Nielsen (1823-1904), Norwegian politician
- Sivert Andreas Nielsen (1916-2004), Norwegian diplomat, politician and banker
