= Moy Nordahl =

Norwegian physiotherapist and politician

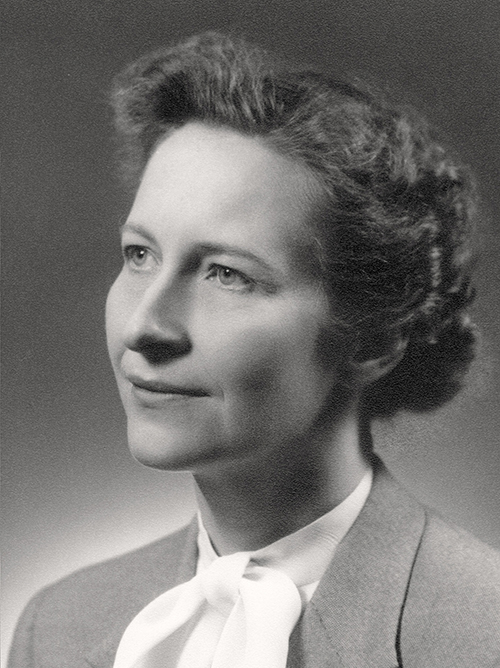
- Born: 14 November 1907; Buksnes, Norway
- Died: 17 June 1993 (aged 85)
- Occupations: Physiotherapist and politician.

Moy Herborg Regina Nordahl (14 November 1907 – 17 June 1993) was a Norwegian physiotherapist and politician from Fauske Municipality in Nordland county.

She was born in Buksnes Municipality to Otto Rinnan and Helena Hansen. She was elected deputy representative for Nordland in the Storting for several periods, 1945–1965, for the Conservative Party. She replaced Håkon Kyllingmark at the Storting August–September 1963, when Kyllingmark was member of Lyng's Cabinet. Nordahl served as vice president of the Norwegian Red Cross from 1966 to 1972.
