= Ole Myrvoll =

Norwegian politician

Mayor of Bergen
- In office 1 January 1972 – 30 September 1973
- Preceded by: Ragnar Juell Morken
- Succeeded by: Eilert Eilertsen

Minister of Finance
- In office 12 October 1965 – 17 March 1971
- Prime Minister: Per Borten
- Preceded by: Andreas Cappelen
- Succeeded by: Ragnar Christiansen

Minister of Pay and Prices
- In office 28 August 1963 – 25 September 1963
- Prime Minister: John Lyng
- Preceded by: Karl Trasti
- Succeeded by: Karl Trasti

Personal details
- Born: 18 May 1911 Kragerø, Norway
- Died: 16 July 1988 (aged 77) Bergen, Norway
- Party: Liberal (formerly); New People's

Ole Myrvoll (18 May 1911 – 16 July 1988) was a Norwegian professor in economy and politician for the Liberal Party and later the New People's Party.

He was born in Kragerø.

He served as a deputy representative to the Norwegian Parliament from Bergen during the terms 1965–1969 and 1969–1973. From August to September 1963 he was Minister of Wages and Prices during the short-lived centre-right cabinet Lyng. He became Minister of Finance from 1965 to 1971 during the cabinet Borten. In December 1972, Myrvoll joined the New People's Party which split from the Liberal Party over disagreements of Norway's proposed entry to the European Economic Community. He was elected to Norwegian Parliament for this party in 1973, this time from Hordaland as Bergen had ceased to be a county and as such constituency.

On the local level Myrvoll was a member of the executive committee of Bergen city council from 1947 to 1955 and 1974 to 1975. He served as mayor from 1972 to 1973.

An economist by profession, he graduated with a cand.oecon. degree in 1935, and with an MA degree from the University of Virginia in 1937. He was hired as a research fellow at the Norwegian School of Economics and Business Administration in 1942, and was given the professorate following his doctorate degree in 1957 at the same school.

Political offices
Preceded by Ragnar Juell Morken	Mayor of Bergen; 1972–1973	Succeeded by Eilert Eilertsen
Preceded by Karl Trasti	Minister of Wages and Prices (Norway); August 1963–September 1963	Succeeded by Karl Trasti
Preceded by Andreas Zeier Cappelen	Minister of Finance (Norway); 1965–1971	Succeeded by Ragnar Christiansen
