= Petter Øgar =

Norwegian physician and civil servant (born 1953)

Petter Øgar (born 5 September 1953) is a Norwegian physician and civil servant.

He was born in Oslo, and graduated with the cand.med. degree in 1978. He worked at Kongsberg Hospital from 1980 to 1983. He was district physician in Stryn Municipality from 1983 to 1984 and municipal physician in Hornindal Municipality from 1984 to 1995, and from 1995 he was the county physician in Sogn og Fjordane, residing in Sogndal Municipality.

In 2000, when director of the Norwegian Board of Health Supervision Anne Alvik was first granted a six-month absence of leave, Øgar became acting director. He was succeeded by another acting director, Lars E. Hanssen, in the autumn. From October 2010 Øgar is a deputy under-secretary of state for the Department of Municipal Health Care Services in the Ministry of Health and Care Services.

In his younger days he was an able long-distance runner, with personal best times of 9:31.6 (3000 metres steeplechase), 14:47.8 (5000 metres), 30:49.0 (10,000 metres) and 2:37:18 (marathon)—all achieved in 1977. He represented the club Grorud IL.

Civic offices
Preceded by Anne Alvik	Director of the Norwegian Board of Health Supervision (acting); March 2000–September 2000	Succeeded by Lars E. Hanssen
