= Torbjørn Mork =

Norwegian civil servant

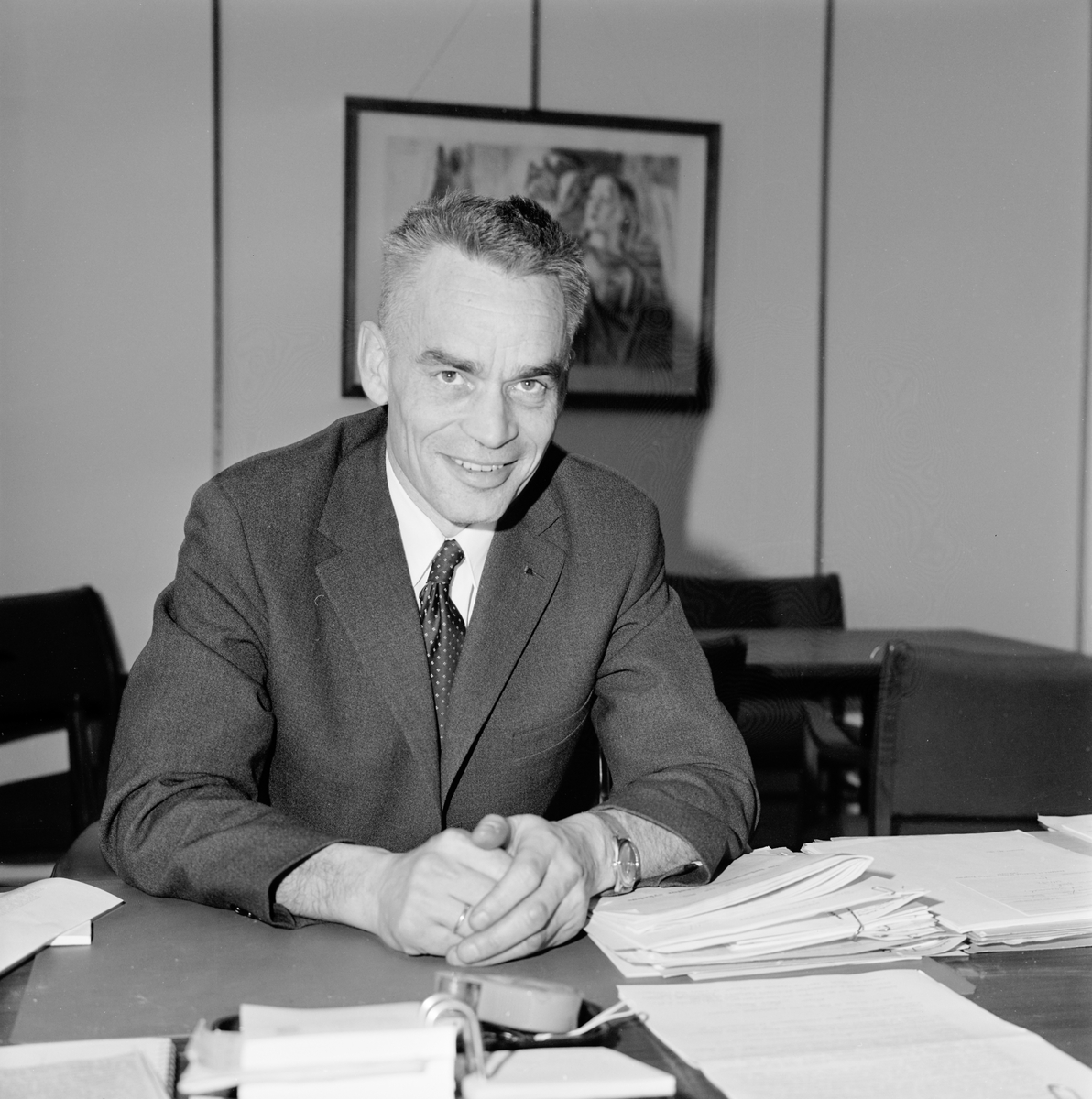
Torbjørn Mork

Torbjørn Mork (17 November 1928 – 16 October 1992) was a Norwegian physician and civil servant.

He was born in Odda Municipality as a son of Guttorm Mork (1897–1974) and Inga Skadsem (1894–1950). He took the examen artium in 1948 and graduated with the cand.med. degree from the University of Bergen in 1954. After working as a physician in Arendal Municipality, Herdla Municipality, and Haukeland Hospital in Bergen Municipality, he got a World Health Organization scholarship to study at the London School of Hygiene and Tropical Medicine. In 1960 he took the PhD degree there with the thesis A Comparative Study of Respiratory Diseases in England, Wales and Norway. In 1960 he was hired in the Cancer Registry of Norway. He was promoted to assisting chief physician in 1966.

He left the Cancer Registry in 1971 to become State Secretary in the Ministry of Social Affairs. He represented the Labour Party, and had been a municipal councilman in Asker Municipality from 1968 to 1975. Reportedly, he was appointed because the Minister of Social Affairs, Odd Højdahl, had his strengths in general administration, and was lacking in knowledge about social policy. Mork was only State Secretary until 1972, as the first cabinet Bratteli fell. In 1972, however, he was appointed as director of the Norwegian Directorate for Health, succeeding the legendary Karl Evang. Evang himself had made a halfhearted attempt to promote Jon Bjørnsson as successor. Besides Mork, the only likely candidate was Gudmund Harlem.

Norway went through many reforms during his time as health director. Among others, abortion was legalized in 1978. Mork also worked on an international level in the United Nations and Council of Europe. He was a member of the executive board of the World Health Organization from 1979 to 1982, from 1980 to 1981 as deputy chair. He was also active in NAVF.

He was married to librarian Anna Brit Schjøtt from 1955 to 1978, and was after that a cohabitant with Wenche Margrethe Myhre. He remained health director until his death in October 1992.

Civic offices
| Preceded by Karl Evang | Director of the Norwegian Directorate for Health; 1972–1992 | Succeeded by Anne Alvik |
