= Ministry of Pay and Prices =

Former government ministry of Norway

The Royal Norwegian Ministry of Pay and Prices (Norwegian: Lønns- og prisdepartementet) was a Norwegian ministry that existed from 1955 to 1972.

It was established on 1 August 1955. It ceased to exist on 7 May 1972, its tasks were mainly transferred to the Ministry of Family and Consumer Affairs.

The heads of the Ministry of Pay and Prices were Gunnar Bråthen (1955-1959), Gunnar Bøe (1959-1962), Karl Trasti (1962-1963), Ole Myrvoll (1963), Karl Trasti (1963-1964), Idar Norstrand (1964-1965), Dagfinn Vårvik (1965-1971) and Olav Gjærevoll (1971-1972).

== List of ministers ==
=== Key ===
Centre Party
Labour Party
Liberal Party

=== Ministers ===
Photo	Name	Party	Took office	Left office	Tenure	Cabinet
	Gunnar Bråthen	Labour	1 August 1955	9 April 1959	3 years, 251 days	Gerhardsen III
	Gunnar Bøe	Labour	9 April 1959	1 September 1962	3 years, 145 days	Gerhardsen III
	Karl Trasti	Labour	1 September 1962	28 August 1963	361 days	Gerhardsen III
	Ole Myrvoll	Liberal	28 August 1963	25 September 1963	28 days	Lyng
	Karl Trasti	Labour	25 September 1963	20 January 1964	117 days	Gerhardsen IV
	Idar Norstrand	Labour	20 January 1964	12 October 1965	1 year, 265 days	Gerhardsen IV
	Dagfinn Vårvik	Centre	12 October 1965	17 March 1971	5 years, 156 days	Borten
	Olav Gjærevoll	Labour	17 March 1971	8 May 1972	1 year, 52 days	Bratteli I
