= Oddvar Berrefjord =

Norwegian politician (1918–1999)

Minister of Justice
- In office 3 October 1980 – 4 February 1981
- Prime Minister: Odvar Nordli
- Preceded by: Andreas Cappelen
- Succeeded by: Bjørn Skau
- In office 17 March 1971 – 18 October 1972
- Prime Minister: Trygve Bratteli
- Preceded by: Egil Endresen
- Succeeded by: Petter Mørch Koren

Governor of Telemark
- In office 30 September 1976 – 1 October 1987
- Prime Minister: Odvar Nordli; Gro Harlem Brundtland; Kåre Willoch
- Preceded by: Olav Haukvik
- Succeeded by: Kjell Bohlin

County Mayor of Telemark
- In office 1 January 1968 – 17 March 1971
- Preceded by: Arne Midgaard
- Succeeded by: Sigurd Kolltviet

Personal details
- Born: 20 March 1918 Vardø, Finnmark, Norway
- Died: 25 November 1999 (aged 81) Skien, Telemark, Norway
- Party: Labour

Oddvar Berrefjord (born 20 March 1918 in Vardø, died 25 November 1999) was a Norwegian jurist and politician for the Labour Party.

He was Minister of Justice and the Police from 1971 to 1972 in the first cabinet Bratteli, and from 1980 to 1981 in the cabinet Nordli. As an elected politician he served in the position of deputy representative to the Norwegian Parliament from Telemark during the terms 1965–1969 and 1969–1973.

On the local level he was a member of municipal council of Skien Municipality from 1945 to 1959 and 1963 to 1971, serving the last four years as deputy mayor. He was also county mayor of Telemark county from 1967 to 1971. He chaired the county party chapter from 1963 to 1968, and was a member of the national party board from 1963 to 1979. He was County Governor of Telemark from 1976 to 1987.

Outside politics Berrefjord was a jurist. He graduated as cand.jur. in 1941, and participated as a judge in the Legal purge in Norway after World War II. He later worked as a district attorney in Telemark and as a presiding judge.

Political offices
Preceded by	County mayor of Telemark; 1967–1971	Succeeded by
Preceded by Egil Endresen	Norwegian Minister of Justice and the Police; 1971–1972	Succeeded by Petter Mørch Koren
Preceded by Olav Haukvik	County Governor of Telemark; 1976–1987	Succeeded by Kjell Bohlin
Preceded by Andreas Zeier Cappelen	Norwegian Minister of Justice and the Police; 1980–1981	Succeeded by Bjørn Skau
