= Reidar Danielsen =

Norwegian civil servant (1916–2000)

Reidar Ditlev Danielsen (1916–2000) was a Norwegian civil servant.

He was born in Oslo, and held the siv.ing. degree in engineering. He was an assistant secretary in the Ministry of Industry and Craft from 1946 to 1953, and was director of the Norwegian Directorate of Rationalisation from 1957 to 1963. He was acting permanent under-secretary of state in the Ministry of Industry in 1963, and then director of the Norwegian Directorate of Labour from 1964 to 1985.

Civic offices
Preceded by	Director of the Norwegian Directorate of Rationalisation; 1957–1963	Succeeded by
Preceded by Gunnar Bråthen	Director of the Norwegian Directorate of Labour; 1964–1985	Succeeded by Kjell Stahl
