= Gunnar Bråthen =

Norwegian trade unionist and politician

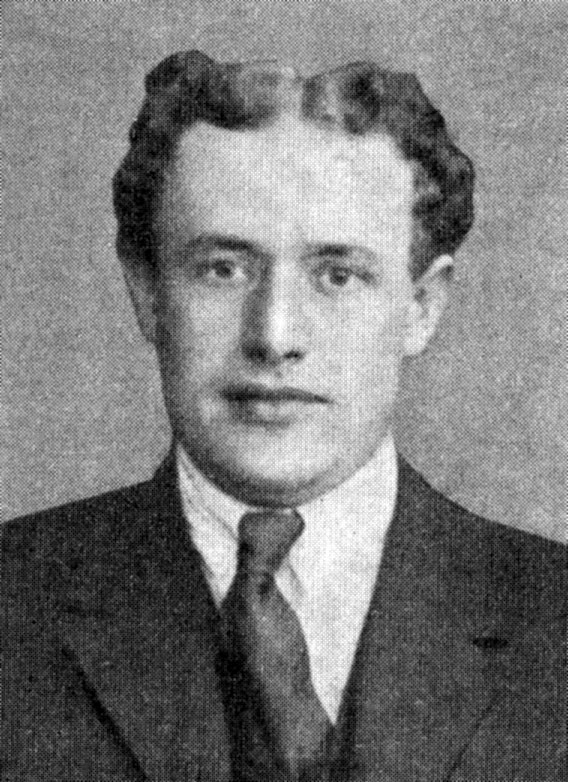
Gunnar Bråthen

Gunnar Bråthen (7 October 1896 – 7 June 1980) was a Norwegian trade unionist and politician for the Labour Party. He was Minister of Pay and Prices from 1955 to 1959.

He was born in Hole as a son of a baker. He was a member of Kristiania city council from 1922 to 1925. He was a board member of the Norwegian Union of Iron and Metalworkers during the same period, and then a secretary from 1925 to 1931. After seven years in Hedmark faglige samorganisasjon he was a secretary in the Norwegian Confederation of Trade Unions in Northern Norway from 1938 to 1941, and nationwide from 1945 to 1950. Between 1941 and 1945 he was a member of the Norwegian resistance movement. He was first arrested on 1 July 1941, and was imprisoned in Grini concentration camp from February 1942 to January 1943. He was arrested for a second time on 21 September 1944, imprisoned in Falstad concentration camp from November 1944 to January 1945, then in Grini concentration camp until the end of World War II. From 1950 to 1963 he was the director of the Norwegian Directorate of Labour.

He was a member of the central committee of the Labour Party from 1949 to 1957. From 1955 to 1959 he was the Minister of Pay and Prices, serving in Gerhardsen's Third Cabinet.

Bråthen was a member of several public councils. He was also a board member of Fosdalen Bergverk from 1946 to 1966, Samvirkebanken from 1952 to 1967 (chair from 1963 to 1967), Norsk Jernverk from 1963 to 1966, Norasonde from 1965 to 1969 and Sydvaranger.

Civic offices
Preceded by Sverre Iversen	Director of the Norwegian Directorate of Labour; 1950–1964	Succeeded by Reidar Danielsen
Political offices
Preceded by position created	Norwegian Minister of Pay and Prices; 1955–1959	Succeeded by Gunnar Bøe
