= Dagfinn Vårvik =

Norwegian politician

Minister of Foreign Affairs
- In office 18 October 1972 – 16 October 1973
- Prime Minister: Lars Korvald
- Preceded by: Andreas Cappelen
- Succeeded by: Knut Frydenlund

Minister of Finance
- In office 28 August 1963 – 25 September 1963
- Prime Minister: John Lyng
- Preceded by: Andreas Cappelen
- Succeeded by: Andreas Cappelen

Minister of Pay and Prices
- In office 12 October 1965 – 17 March 1971
- Prime Minister: Per Borten
- Preceded by: Idar Norstrand
- Succeeded by: Olav Gjærevoll

Leader of the Centre Party
- In office 1973–1977
- Preceded by: John Austrheim
- Succeeded by: Gunnar Stålsett

Personal details
- Born: 8 June 1924 Leinstrand Municipality, Sør-Trøndelag, Norway
- Died: 25 March 2018 (aged 93) Oslo, Norway
- Party: Centre
- Spouse: Bjørg Presttrø

Dagfinn Vårvik (8 June 1924 – 25 March 2018) was a Norwegian politician for the Centre Party. He was born in Leinstrand Municipality.

Vårvik graduated with a cand.oecon. degree in 1951. He served as a deputy representative to the Norwegian Parliament from Akershus during the term 1961–1965. He worked in the newspaper Nationen from 1961 to 1991, as a journalist except for the period 1963 to 1988 when he was editor-in-chief.From August to September 1963 he was Minister of Finance during the short-lived centre-right cabinet Lyng.

He was later Minister of Wages and Prices from 1965 to 1971 during the cabinet Borten, and Minister of Foreign Affairs from 1972 to 1973 during the cabinet Korvald. He was a deputy member of Oslo city council in 1971–1975 and served as the chairman of the Centre Party from 1973 to 1977.

Vårvik died on 25 March 2018 at the age of 93.

Party political offices
| Preceded by John Austrheim | Leader of the Centre Party of Norway; 1973–1977 | Succeeded by Gunnar Stålsett |
Political offices
| Preceded by Andreas Cappelen | Minister of Finance (Norway); August 1963–September 1963 | Succeeded by Andreas Cappelen |
| Preceded by Idar Olav Norstrand | Minister of Wages and Prices (Norway); 1965–1971 | Succeeded by Olav Gjærevoll |
| Preceded by Andreas Cappelen | Minister of Foreign Affairs (Norway); 1972–1973 | Succeeded by Knut Frydenlund |
