= Kjell Bohlin =

Norwegian politician (1928–2011)

Kjell Gotfred Bohlin (27 September 1928 – 17 June 2011) was a Norwegian politician for the Labour Party.

He was born in Røros Municipality. He was elected to the Parliament of Norway from Telemark in 1977, and was re-elected on two occasions. He had previously served as a deputy representative from 1969 to 1973.

On the local level Bohlin was deputy mayor of Bamble Municipality from 1963 to 1970, and then mayor from 1971 to 1981. He returned as a member of the municipal council of Bamble Municipality from 2003 to 2007. From 1967 to 1981 he was also involved in county politics in Telemark, serving as deputy county mayor from 1975 to 1981. His political career ended with the position of County Governor of Telemark, which he held from 1989 to 1998, having been appointed in 1987.

Outside politics he was a journalist in Arbeidets Rett from 1948 to 1949 but spent the majority of his career as a social security bureaucrat.

He died in June 2011 in Langesund.

Government offices
Preceded by Oddvar Berrefjord	County Governor of Telemark; 1989–1998	Succeeded by Solveig Sollie
