= Karl Evang =

Norwegian physician and civil servant

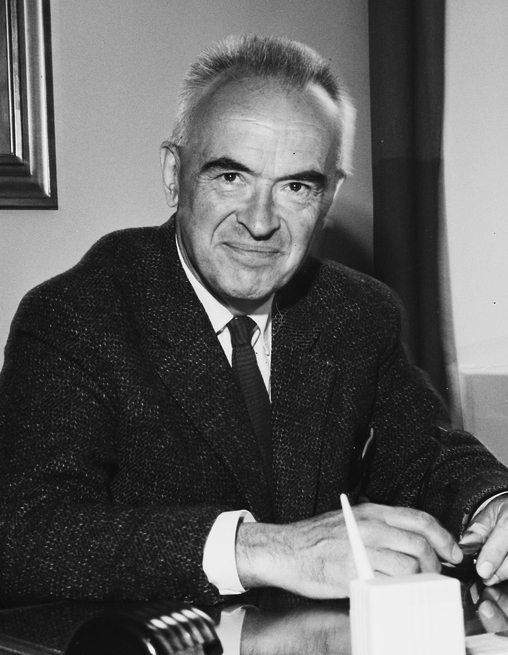
Karl Evang.

Karl Evang (19 October 1902 – 3 January 1981) was a Norwegian physician and civil servant.

He was born in Kristiania as a son of assisting secretary Jens Ingolf Evang (1873–1914) and Anna Beate Wexelsen (1875–1954). He was a brother of Vilhelm Evang, and a relative of Vilhelm Andreas Wexelsen, Per Kvist and Gunnar Jahn. His sister Anne Beate married another civil servant, Karl Ludvig Bugge. Karl Evang met physician Gerda S. Landmark Moe (1905–1985) in 1926, and married her in 1929.

He enrolled in medicine studies at the Royal Frederick University in 1924, and became a member of the revolutionary group Mot Dag in 1926 which had a strong standing among students. Mot Dag was affiliated with the Communist Party of Norway at the time, but soon became independent. Evang was also active in the Norwegian Support Committee for Spain and Clarté. He was elected chairman of the Norwegian Students' Society in 1931, while serving a prison sentence for conscientious objection. He joined the Norwegian Labour Party after Mot Dag's demise in 1933.

In the 1930s he became a noted public debater. He issued the 1934 book Rasepolitikk og reaksjon, and wrote with the purpose of medicinal and hygienic enlightenment in the publications Populært Tidsskrift for Seksuell Oplysning (which he edited) and Arbeidermagasinet. He was also a popular radio speaker and lecturer. In 1938 he was appointed to the vacant position as director of the Norwegian Directorate for Health. When World War II came to Norway, Evang followed the cabinet Nygaardsvold first to Northern Norway, then to exile in the United Kingdom. Evang was given the rank of lieutenant colonel. He spent the war years organizing a health administration for Norwegians abroad, spending time in the USA as well. After the war he co-founded the World Health Organization; he was also board chairman for some time. His position was strengthened after the war, and Evang signalized technocratic ambitions. Similarly, the health conditions in Norway improved in the post-war years. Poliomyelitis was eradicated and tuberculosis diminished. However, several welfare programs were implemented long after Evang's initiatives. He also had political ambitions (Minister of Social Affairs, probably also Prime Minister) that were never fulfilled.

In 1972 he had to retire due to the age limit of 70. He spent one year as a guest professor at the University of Tromsø. He also became more radical politically. He had been an opponent of Norwegian participation in the Korean War and NATO, co-founded the newspaper Orientering and opposed Norwegian EEC membership in 1972. In 1973 he joined the Socialist Electoral League. He released the book Helse og Samfunn, an overview of the contemporary health sector. Other releases include selected articles from Populært Tidsskrift for Seksuell Oplysning, which were released in book form in 1947 and 1951.

He suffered from a stroke, and subsequent aphasia from 1976 to his death in January 1981 in Oslo.

== Publications ==
- Die Hauptaufgaben der II. Internationalen Konferenz. In: Internationales ärztliches Bulletin, 1. Jg, (1934), Heft 5 (Mai), p. 69-70. Digitalisat
- Rassenhygiene und Sozialismus. (Referat auf der II. Internationalen Konferenz Sozialistischer Ärzte in Brünn, Pfingsten 1934.) In: Internationales ärztliches Bulletin, 1. Jg, (1934), Heft 9 (September), p. 130-135. Digitalisat
- Aus der sozialistischen Ärztebewegung. Bericht vom Sozialistischen Ärzteverein Norwegens. In: Internationales ärztliches Bulletin, 3. Jg, (1936), Heft 9-10 (November-Dezember), p. 133-134. Digitalisat
- Medical Care and Family Security (with David Stark Murray, and Walter Jay Lear) Prentice-Hall, 1963

Civic offices
Preceded by Nils Peter Laberg Heitman	Director of the Norwegian Directorate for Health; 1938–1972	Succeeded by Torbjørn Mork
