= Trygve Lie Gallery =

Art gallery in Manhattan, New York

Coordinates: 40°45.35′0″N 73°58.00′0″W

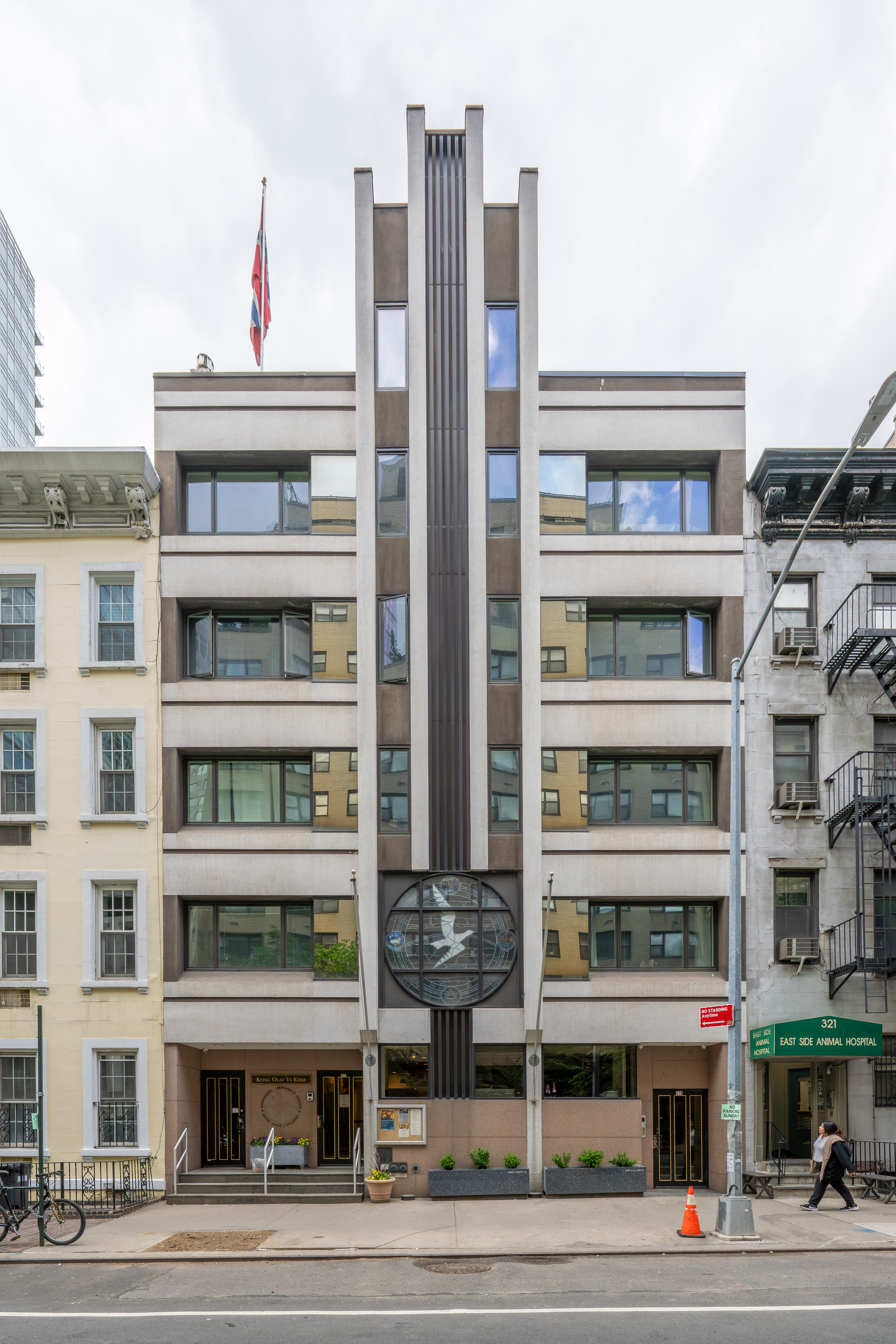
317 East 52nd Street

Trygve Lie Gallery is an art gallery located at 317 East 52nd Street in Manhattan, New York City.

== History ==
Trygve Lie Gallery was established to promote Norwegian American culture and Scandinavian art to a broad audience in New York City. On September 19, 2003, the gallery was opened by the former Norwegian Ambassador to the United States, Knut Vollebæk. Trygve Lie Gallery has exhibited a number of leading Norwegian and Scandinavian artists. In addition to exhibiting art and documentary projects, the gallery space is used for recitals, conferences, and performances.

Trygve Lie Gallery is named for Trygve Lie, who was the first Secretary-General of the United Nations. There are maintaining connections to the United Nations Headquarters which is situated ten blocks south of the gallery. The gallery is located in and run by the Norwegian Seamen's Church in New York which has more than a 130 years of history in New York City.
