= Bodil Aakre =

Norwegian jurist and politician (1922–2008)

Bodil Aakre (7 September 1922 – 8 November 2008) was a Norwegian jurist and politician for the Conservative Party. She was also known for her involvement with the Brønnøysund Register Centre.

== Career ==
She was born in Kristiania. She enrolled as a student in 1942 and graduated as cand.jur. in 1948. She then worked as a jurist in Hammerfest Municipality and Alta Municipality from 1948 to 1957. In 1957, she was hired as a consultant in Nordland Landbruksselskap.

She was elected to the Parliament of Norway from Nordland in 1969. She originally served as a deputy representative in the period 1965–1969. During this term she served temporarily as a regular representative meanwhile Håkon Kyllingmark were appointed to the cabinet Borten, until February 1967 when the death of Harald Warholm meant that Aakre moved up in the hierarchy to serve as a full representative. Kyllingmark was instead covered by another former deputy representative Leif Kolflaath. Bodil Aakre was not re-elected in 1973, but instead served another term as deputy representative.

On the local level, Aakre was mayor of Brønnøy Municipality from 1975 to 1979. She worked as the district stipendiary magistrate (sorenskriver) for the Brønnøy District Court from 1973 to 1988. From 1980 she also worked as a head of department in the Brønnøysund Register Centre. She was called the "mother of the Brønnøysund Register Centre".

Aakre was a member of the board of the Norwegian Directorate of Labour from 1967 to 1971 and of the bank Nordlandsbanken from 1977 to 1982. She was the deputy chair of the Directorate of Labour from 1975 to 1983, of the Norwegian Labour Inspection Authority from 1972 to 1988 and of Nordlandsbanken from 1982. She was also involved in Foreningen Norden and Riksmålsforbundet.

Aakre retired in 1988. She died in 2008 in Benidorm, Spain, where she had lived since 1991.
