= Kaare Meland =

Norwegian politician (1915–2002)

Minister of Industry
- In office 28 August 1963 – 25 September 1963
- Prime Minister: John Lyng
- Preceded by: Trygve Lie
- Succeeded by: Trygve Lie

Member of the Norwegian Parliament
- In office 1 October 1965 – 30 September 1969
- Constituency: Hordaland

Deputy Member of the Norwegian Parliament
- In office 1 January 1954 – 30 September 1961
- Constituency: Hordaland

Personal details
- Born: 22 May 1915 Bergen, Hordaland, Norway
- Died: 31 December 2002 (aged 87)
- Party: Conservative

Kaare Meland (22 May 1915 – 31 December 2002) was a Norwegian politician for the Conservative Party.

He was born in Bergen.

He was elected to the Norwegian Parliament from Hordaland in 1965, but was not re-elected in 1969. He had previously served in the position of deputy representative during the terms 1954–1957 and 1958–1961. From August to September 1963 he served as the Minister of Industry during the short-lived centre-right cabinet Lyng.

Meland was a member of Fana municipality council from 1945 to 1951, and later became mayor from 1956–1959. In 1955–1959 he was also a member of Hordaland county council.

Outside politics he graduated from the Norwegian School of Economics and Business Administration in 1939 and became an authorized financial auditor in 1945. He was CEO of Bergens Sparebank from 1964 to 1980.

Government offices
Preceded by Trygve Lie	Minister of Industry (Norway); August 1963–September 1963	Succeeded by Trygve Lie
