= Wilhelm Bøe =

Norwegian organizational leader

Wilhelm Sundt Bøe (30 September 1915 – 19 October 1980) was a Norwegian organizational leader. He was born in Bergen. He was a co-founder of the Bergen chapter of the Red Cross, and later had leading positions in the Red Cross in Bergen, Oslo and in the Norwegian Red Cross. After World War II he was engaged in international humanitarian work. He was decorated Knight, First Order of the Order of St. Olav in 1976.
