= Alf-Jørgen Aas =

Norwegian painter and art instructor (1915–1981)

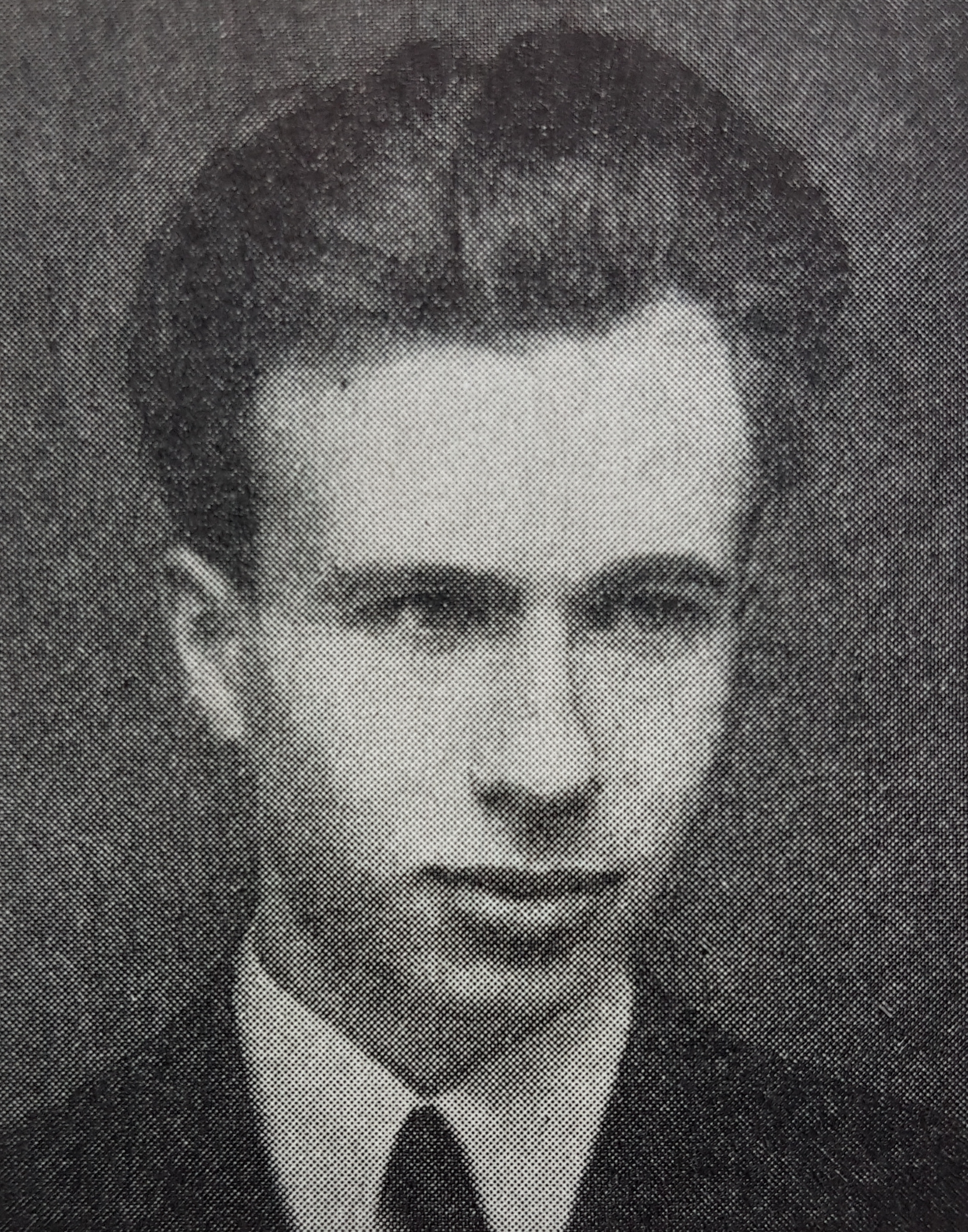
Alf-Jørgen Aas

Alf-Jørgen Aas (5 July 1915 – 20 August 1981) was a Norwegian painter and art instructor.

== Biography ==
He was born in Trondheim and studied at the Norwegian National Academy of Fine Arts from 1934 to 1938 under Axel Revold (1887–1962), Jean Heiberg (1884–1976) and Georg Jacobsen. He debuted at the contemporary art gallery Kunstnerforbundet in Oslo during November 1939. He exhibited at the Autumn Exhibition at Oslo in 1945. He was married in 1945 to Ingeborg Bühler.

Aas became professor at the National Academy of Fine Arts in 1965, and rector from 1975 to 1980. Aas was actively involved in the initial phase when the Henie-Onstad Art Centre was founded in Høvikodden, and he was a key adviser to the collection for several years.

Aas's simplified forms and used a consensus color scale characterized by green, blue, violet and ocher. He often painted in acrylic or watercolor as well as oil on canvas. He developed a sense of self-criticism, by which he would scrape out and paint over again time after time. In his latest work, he reached forward to a near-total abstraction. He is represented with seven works in the National Gallery of Norway. His works on display include: Atelier-stilleben (1945), Portrett av kunstnerens hustru (1945) and Vindu (1975).

== Other sources ==
- Ljøsne, A. G. Alf-Jørgen Aas, 1915–1981 (exhibition catalog. Oslo: Kunstforening, 1983)
