= Kåre Grøndahl Hagem =

Norwegian politician

Kåre Grøndahl Hagem (9 March 1915 – 2 August 2008) was a Norwegian politician for the Conservative Party.

He served as a deputy representative to the Parliament of Norway from Østfold during the term 1958–1961 term. In total, he attended parliamentary sessions for eight days.
