= Håkon Kyllingmark =

Norwegian politician (1915–2003)

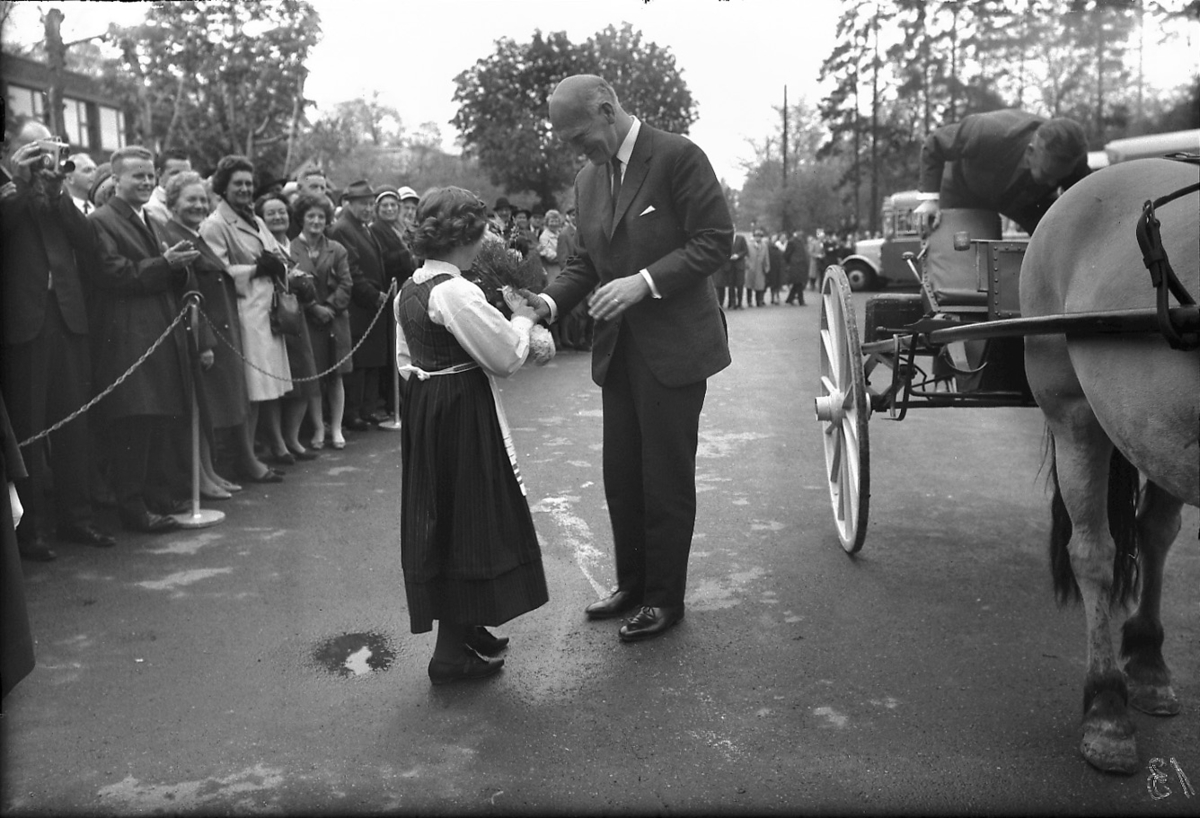
- Håkon Kyllingmark at the Norwegian Maritime Museum in 1967

Minister of Transport and Communications
- In office 12 October 1965 – 17 March 1971
- Prime Minister: Per Borten
- Preceded by: Erik Himle
- Succeeded by: Reiulf Steen

Minister of Defence
- In office 28 August 1963 – 25 September 1963
- Prime Minister: John Lyng
- Preceded by: Gudmund Harlem
- Succeeded by: Gudmund Harlem

Second Deputy Leader of the Conservative Party
- In office 1958 – 26 April 1970
- Leader: Alv Kjøs; Sjur Lindebrække
- Preceded by: Claudia Olsen
- Succeeded by: Lars T. Platou

Member of the Norwegian Parliament
- In office 1 January 1954 – 30 September 1981
- Constituency: Nordland

Personal details
- Born: Håkon Olai Kyllingmark; 19 January 1915 Honningsvåg, Finnmark, Norway
- Died: 12 August 2003 (aged 88) Svolvær, Nordland, Norway
- Party: Conservative
- Spouse: Ingegerd Ødegaard (m. 1942)
- Children: Snorre Kyllingmark, Bjørg Henriksen (Kyllingmark)

Håkon Olai Kyllingmark (19 January 1915 – 12 August 2003) was a Norwegian military officer and businessman. He served as a politician for the Conservative Party and was elected to the Norwegian Parliament.

== Biography ==
He was born at Kjelvik in Finnmark, Norway. His parents were Martin Kyllingmark (1879-1916) and Sigridur Sæmundsdottir (1892-1963). He received an education at the Army Command School in 1934 and the Flyvåpen Flying School in 1937. He had a career in the Norwegian Armed Forces between in 1940 and 1943–1945. He rose to the rank of captain in 1944 and major in 1945–1954. He had been a member of Milorg during the German occupation of Norway, and received the Defence Medal 1940–1945.

Kyllingmark was a principally of the wholesale company H. Kyllingmark A / S from 1945 to 1965. He was involved in local politics in Svolvær from 1945 to 1947 and 1951 to 1963. He was elected to the Norwegian Parliament from Nordland in 1954, and was re-elected on six occasions. From August to September 1963 he was Minister of Defence during the short-lived centre-right cabinet Lyng. While he held this position Moy Herborg Regina Nordahl took his seat in parliament. He was later Norwegian Minister of Transport from 1965 to 1971 during the cabinet Borten. His seat was filled by Bodil Aakre, Leif Kolflaath and Andreas Grimsø alternately.

Preceded by Gudmund Harlem	Norwegian Minister of Defence; 1963	Succeeded by Gudmund Harlem
Preceded by Erik Himle	Norwegian Minister of Transport; 1965–1971	Succeeded by Reiulf Steen
