= Eilert Eilertsen =

Norwegian footballer, physician, and politician

Eilert Eilertsen (25 February 1918 – 24 February 2014) was a Norwegian footballer, physician and politician for the Conservative Party. He was the longest-serving mayor of Bergen, in office from 1973 to 1984.

== Biography ==
Eilertsen was born and raised in Bergen. During his youth he played association football for SK Brann, eventually becoming team captain before World War II. After moving to Oslo he joined Lyn, with whom he won the 1945 Norwegian Football Cup.

During the war Eilertsen studied medicine in Oslo, but never finished his education, as he joined the resistance movement and had to flee to the United Kingdom. After the war ended in 1945, he finished his studies at Harvard University in the United States, before returning to Norway to practice. He specialized in tuberculosis, and served as head doctor in the International Tuberculosis Campaign in Italy from 1949 until 1950.

During the 1960s he became more and more involved in politics following his work within the health sector, and joined the Conservative Party. He was elected deputy mayor in 1972, and became mayor the following year. He was the longest-serving mayor in Bergen's history, serving from 1 October 1973 to 1 January 1984.

After stepping down as mayor in 1984, Eilertsen became involved in medicine once again, working with the organization and financing of Norwegian hospitals and trauma centres. He retired from politics and medicine in 1989. Eilertsen remained in Bergen after his retirement, where he died on 24 February 2014, the day before his 96th birthday, of natural causes.
