= Petter Mørch Koren =

Norwegian politician

Minister of Justice
- In office 18 October 1972 – 16 October 1973
- Prime Minister: Lars Korvald
- Preceded by: Oddvar Berrefjord
- Succeeded by: Inger Louise Valle
- In office 28 August 1963 – 25 September 1963
- Prime Minister: John Lyng
- Preceded by: Jens Haugland
- Succeeded by: O. C. Gundersen

County Governor of Akershus
- In office 1 October 1970 – 1 October 1979
- Prime Minister: Per Borten; Trygve Bratteli; Lars Korvald; Odvar Nordli
- Preceded by: John Lyng
- Succeeded by: Gunnar A. Larsen

Personal details
- Born: 22 January 1910 Edinburgh, Scotland, UK
- Died: 14 November 2004 (aged 94) Oslo, Norway
- Party: Christian Democratic

Petter Mørch Koren (22 January 1910 – 14 November 2004) was a Norwegian politician for the Christian Democratic Party.

He was a deputy member of the municipal council in Hedrum Municipality in the period 1937–1938 and held various positions in Oslo city council between 1947 and 1965. He was temporary County Governor of Akershus from 1966 to 1970, and County Governor from 1970 to 1979.

From August to September 1963 he served as the Minister of Justice and the Police during the short-lived centre-right cabinet Lyng. In 1972 he was again appointed to this post in the cabinet Korvald, which lasted until 1973.

A jurist by profession, he graduated with the cand.jur. degree from the University of Oslo in 1932. He worked as a civil servant in various government ministries, held numerous posts in public boards and committees, and worked as a judge.

Legal offices
Preceded by Jens Haugland	Minister of Justice and the Police (Norway); August 1963 – September 1963	Succeeded by Oscar Chr. Gundersen
Preceded by Oddvar Berrefjord	Minister of Justice and the Police (Norway); 1972–1973	Succeeded by Inger Louise Valle
Political offices
Preceded by John Lyng	County Governor of Akershus; 1970–1979	Succeeded by Gunnar A. Larsen
