= Andreas Zeier Cappelen =

Norwegian jurist and politician (1915–2008)

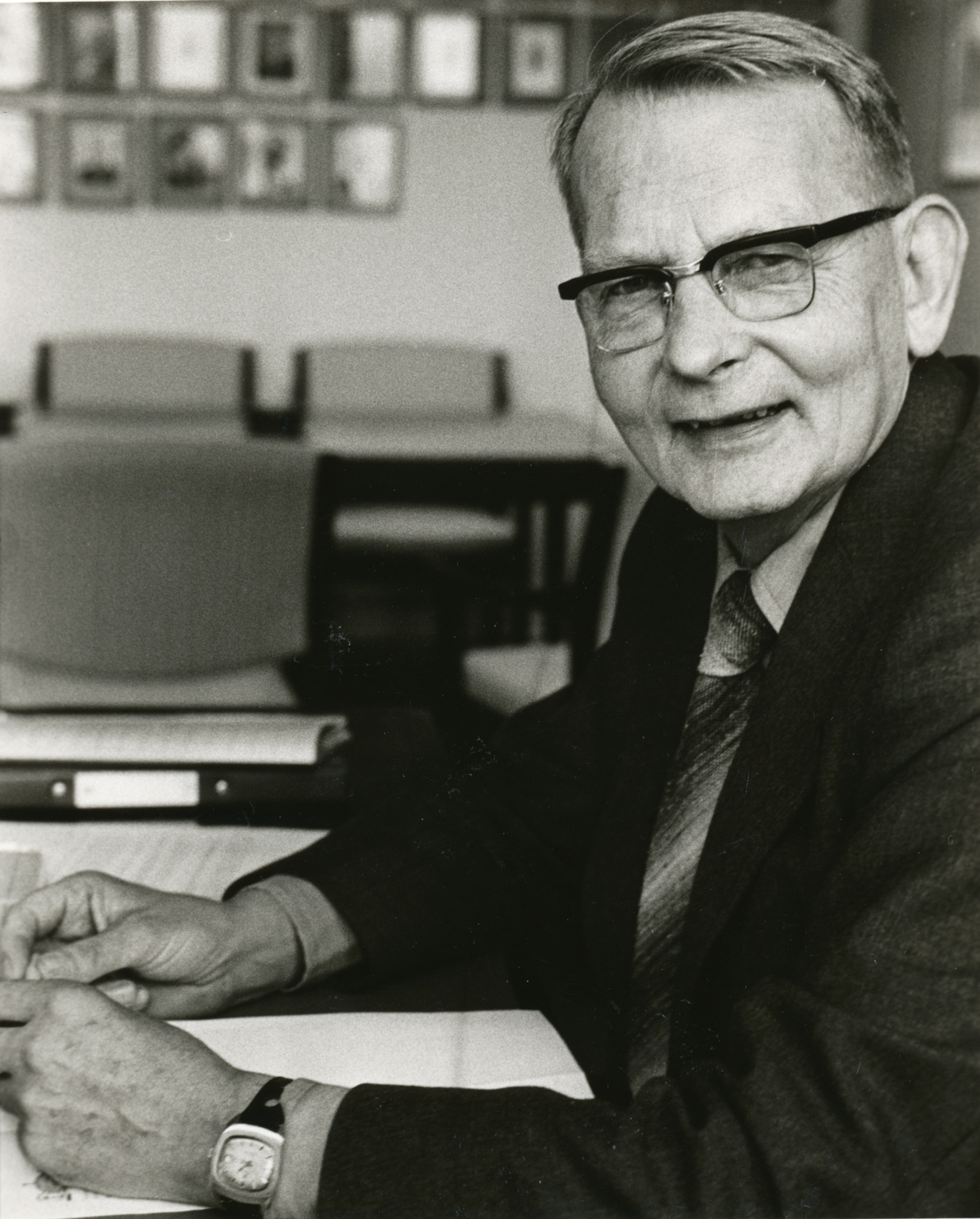

Minister of Foreign Affairs
- In office 17 March 1971 – 18 October 1972
- Prime Minister: Trygve Bratteli
- Preceded by: Svenn Stray
- Succeeded by: Dagfinn Vårvik

Minister of Finance
- In office 25 September 1963 – 12 October 1965
- Prime Minister: Einar Gerhardsen
- Preceded by: Dagfinn Vårvik
- Succeeded by: Ole Myrvoll
- In office 4 February 1963 – 28 August 1963
- Prime Minister: Einar Gerhardsen
- Preceded by: Petter Jakob Bjerve
- Succeeded by: Dagfinn Vårvik

Minister of Justice
- In office 8 October 1979 – 3 October 1980
- Prime Minister: Odvar Nordli
- Preceded by: Inger Louise Valle
- Succeeded by: Oddvar Berrefjord

Minister of Local Government
- In office 1 September 1958 – 4 February 1963
- Prime Minister: Einar Gerhardsen
- Preceded by: Ulrik Olsen
- Succeeded by: Oskar Skogly

Deputy Member of the Norwegian Parliament
- In office 1 October 1961 – 30 September 1965
- Constituency: Rogaland

Personal details
- Born: Andreas Zeier Cappelen; 31 January 1915 Vang, Hedmark, Norway
- Died: 2 September 2008 (aged 93) Stavanger, Rogaland, Norway
- Party: Labour
- Spouse(s): Christiane Borchgrevink (1941-1947); Olene Liberg (1948-1987)
- Children: Ådne Cappelen
- Occupation: Jurist; Politician

Andreas Zeier Cappelen (31 January 1915 – 2 September 2008) was a Norwegian jurist and politician for the Labour Party. He was born in Vang Municipality in Hedmark county.

He held a variety of positions in different Norwegian cabinets. He was Minister of Local Government Affairs in 1958–1963 in the third cabinet Gerhardsen, Minister of Finance in 1963 and 1963–1965 only interrupted by the short-lived cabinet Lyng, Minister of Foreign Affairs in the first cabinet Bratteli in 1971–1972, and finally Minister of Justice 1979–1980 in the cabinet Nordli.

As an elected politician he served in the position of deputy representative to the Norwegian Parliament from Rogaland during the term 1961–1965. On the local level he was a member of the municipal council for Stavanger Municipality in the periods 1945–1947, 1951–1957, 1967–1971 and 1983–1987, serving as deputy mayor briefly in 1953. He was also a member of Rogaland county council from 1966 to 1969. He chaired the county party chapter from 1956 to 1957.

Besides politics he worked as a lawyer and a judge, having graduated as cand.jur. in 1939.

With his brothers he was a member of Mot Dag in the 1930s.

Political offices
Preceded by Johan Ulrik Olsen	Norwegian Minister of Local Government; 1958–1963	Succeeded by Oskar Skogly
Preceded by Petter Jacob Bjerve	Norwegian Minister of Finance and Customs; 1963	Succeeded by Dagfinn Vårvik
Preceded by Dagfinn Vårvik	Norwegian Minister of Finance and Customs; 1963–1965	Succeeded by Ole Myrvoll
Preceded by Svenn Stray	Norwegian Minister of Foreign Affairs; 1971–1972	Succeeded by Dagfinn Vårvik
Preceded by Inger Louise Valle	Norwegian Minister of Justice and the Police; 1979–1980	Succeeded by Oddvar Berrefjord
