= Olav Bruvik =

Norwegian politician (1913–1962)

Olav Bruvik (22 November 1913 – 30 December 1962) was a Norwegian trade unionist and politician for the Labour Party. He was the Norwegian Minister of Social Affairs from 1961 until his death.

He was born in Haus Municipality as a son of Johannes Martin Bruvik (1876–1937) and Martha Koppen (1880–1919). He worked as a blacksmith from 1930 to 1935, then after three years of education in Arna and Norrköping, he worked in the textile industry. He was a member of the Norwegian World War II resistance, and was decorated with the Defence Medal 1940 – 1945. In 1945 he became the leader of his local chapter of the Labour Party, and deputy leader of his trade union Norsk Tekstilarbeiderforbund. The trade union would become a part of Bekledningsarbeiderforbundet in 1969 and the United Federation of Trade Unions in 1988.

He chaired his trade union from 1949 to 1962, and was a member of the secretariat of the Norwegian Confederation of Trade Unions from 1953 to 1961. From 1959 to 1961 he was a deputy member of the Labour Party's central committee. From 18 February 1961 to his death he was a member of Gerhardsen's Third Cabinet, as Norwegian Minister of Social Affairs.

Political offices
Preceded by Gudmund Harlem	Norwegian Minister of Social Affairs; 1961–1962	Succeeded by Aase Bjerkholt
