= Gunnar Bøe =

Norwegian economist and politician

Gunnar Bøe (20 January 1917 – 9 December 1989) was a Norwegian economist and politician for the Labour Party.

== Personal life ==
He was born in Bergen to Gunnar Olaf Bøe (1878–1959) and Ragnhild Sæthre (1883–1974). In 1940, he married Ragnhild Sæthre, born 1917. From 1930 to 1938, due to the marriage of his sister Karen Bøe, he was a brother-in-law of Halvard Manthey Lange and uncle of Even Lange.

== Career ==
From 1934 to 1936, he was a member of the board of the Labour Party in Bergen. His father held a doctorate in medicine, but Bøe enrolled in economics studies at the University of Oslo in 1936. In 1940, he received his cand.oecon. degree. In the same year, the Norwegian Price Directorate hired him, but, because Norway was invaded by Germany, he fought against the invaders in the Norwegian Campaign and became a member of the Milorg resistance. In 1942, the Nazi authorities arrested him. From July 1942 to December 1943, he was held in Grini concentration camp. From 1943 to war's end, he was held in Sachsenhausen concentration camp. After the 1945 liberation, he was a secretary for Prime Minister Einar Gerhardsen. From 1945, he was also named to the Economic Coordination Council. From 1946, he served on the Money and Finance Council. In August 1946, he was appointed a State Secretary in the Ministry of Finance.

In January 1948, he left the state secretary position, and continued his research career. From 1948 to 1952, he was a research fellow at the University of Oslo. From 1952 to 1955, he held the same position at the Norwegian Institute of Technology (NIT). In 1955, he published his thesis Ren profitt under fri konkurranse. From 1955 to 1956, he was a technical adviser for the United Nations commissioner for Europe. In 1956, he received his dr.philos. From 1956, he was a professor at the Norwegian Institute of Technology. From 9 April 1959 to 1 September 1962, he was the Norwegian Minister of Pay and Prices. In 1962, he left politics for good, resuming his academic career. From 1964 to 1967, he was NIT deputy rector. From 1969 to 1972, he was NIT rector. He didn't publish many academic books or articles.

Bøe was a member of the Royal Norwegian Council for Scientific and Industrial Research (NTNF) research council from 1946 to 1947, the board of directors of the Bank of Norway from 1947 to 1953, the Norwegian Research Council for Science and the Humanities (NAVF) from 1957 to 1963 and 1974 to 1981, and the Postal Service (Postverket) from 1969 to 1972. He was a member of the Royal Norwegian Society of Sciences and Letters from 1958 and the Norwegian Academy of Technological Sciences from 1964. He died in Trondheim.

== Suspected Espionage ==
The Police Security Service (PST, POT) suspected Bøe of being a Soviet spy. Soviet documents released in the 1990s showed that he could be very outspoken in meetings with Soviet civil servants. He had a codename, "George," and had a series of meetings with KGB Rezident Aleksandr Startsev. By 1967, POT had bugged Bøe's phone, but they never found hard evidence to prove their suspicions. In 1984, POT tried to speak with him about his Soviet contacts, but were not successful. In July 2014, new information came to light with the release of more documents from KGB defector Vasili Mitrokhin.

Political offices
Preceded by Gunnar Bråthen	Norwegian Minister of Pay and Prices; 1959–1962	Succeeded by Karl Trasti
Academic offices
Preceded by Arne Selberg	Rector of the Norwegian Institute of Technology; 1969–1972	Succeeded by Johannes Moe
