= Harald Warholm =

Norwegian politician

- Born: 21 July 1920; Brønnøy Municipality
- Died: 10 February 1967 (aged 46)
- Occupation: Politician

Harald Warholm (21 July 1920 – 10 February 1967) was a Norwegian politician for the Conservative Party.

He was born in Brønnøy Municipality.

Warholm was elected to the Norwegian Parliament from Nordland in 1958, and was re-elected on two occasions. He died midway through his third term, and was replaced by Bodil Aakre.

Harald Warholm was a member of the municipal council for Brønnøysund Municipality in the period 1959–1963 and of its successor Brønnøy Municipality in 1963–1967.
