= Lars E. Hanssen =

Norwegian physician and civil servant (born 1949)

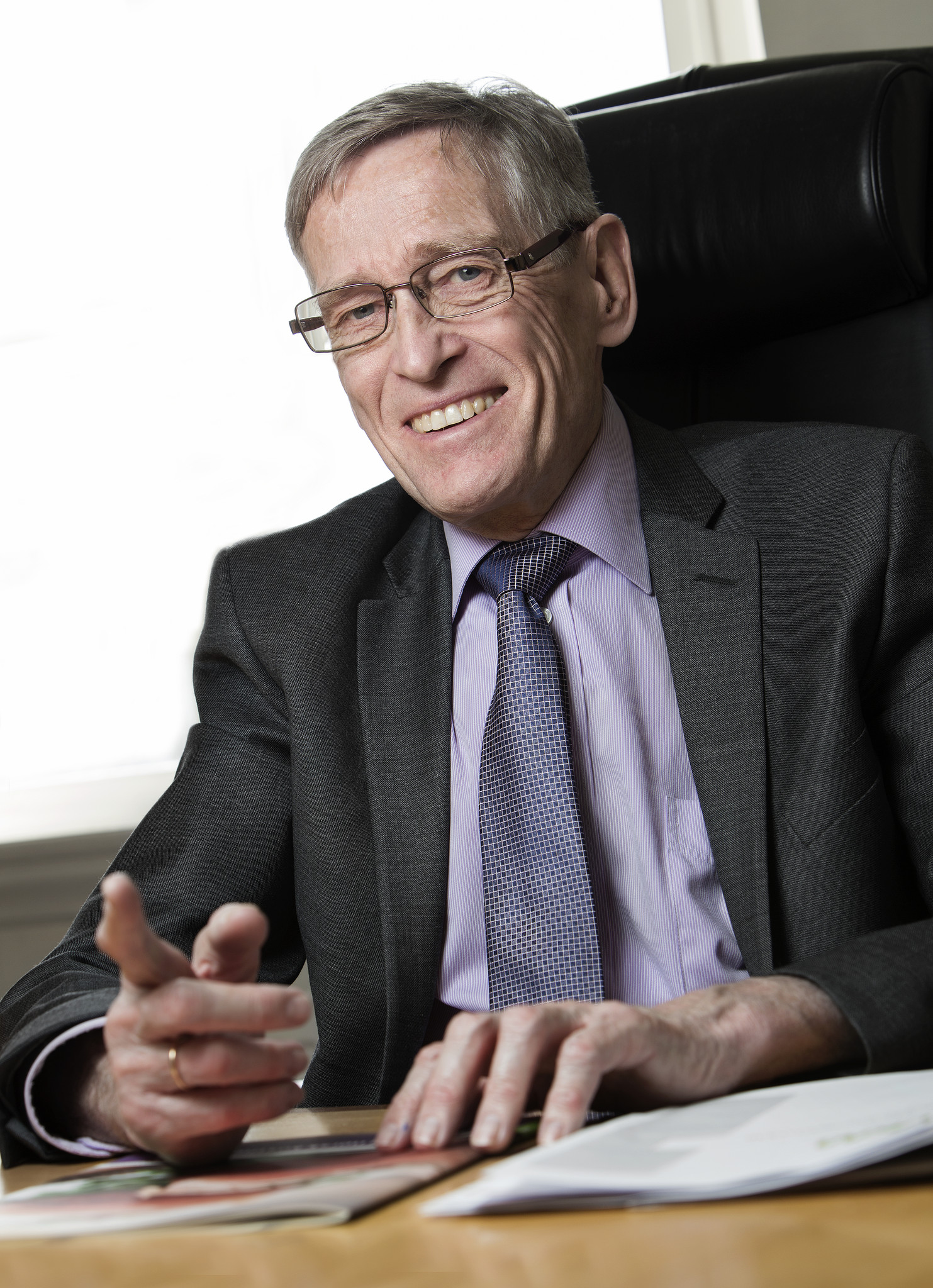
Lars E. Hanssen.

Lars E. Hanssen (born 26 May 1949) is a Norwegian physician and civil servant.

In 1989 Hanssen finished the master's study of health administration at the University of Oslo, in 1990 the Educational Staff Development Programme (Teaching and Learning in Higher Education), in 1995 Norwegian Defence University College, and in 2000 NATO Defence College in Rome. He holds medical specialities in internal medicine (1986), gastroenterology (1986) and endocrinology (1989).

Hanssen was the director of the Norwegian Board of Health Supervision from 2001 until 2012. From 1994 to 2000 he was deputy director, and from October 2000 to 2001 he was acting director. He came from Rikshospitalet, where he held positions as medical director and professor. He has been professor of medicine at the University of Oslo and the University of Bergen and chaired the Faculty Council, Faculty of Medicine, Norwegian University of Science and Technology (NTNU).

Lars E. Hanssen chaired the Governing Council of the International Agency for Research on Cancer (IARC), WHO in Lyon. He has published 200 scientific papers, been Editor-in-Chief of Scandinavian Journal of Gastroenterology (editions in English, Spanish and Chinese) is former Chair of the Research Board on Medicine and Health, Research Council of Norway.

Since 2012 he has been the director of the Norwegian Scientific Committee for Food and Environment and the Norwegian representative in the Advisory Forum of the European Food Safety Authority (EFSA).

Civic offices
Preceded by Anne Alvik	Director of the Norwegian Board of Health Supervision; 2000–2012	Succeeded by Jan Fredrik Andresen
