= Dag Ramsøy Bryn =

Norwegian diplomat and politician (1909–1991)

Dag Ramsøy Bryn (17 March 1909 – 11 April 1991) was a Norwegian diplomat and politician for the Labour Party.

== Biography ==
Bryn was born in Kristiania (now Oslo), Norway. He was the son of Zakarias Bryn (1880-1943) and Ragna Emilie Canelius (1883-1949). He attended the University of Oslo and University of Bergen studying psychology and earning his cand.mag. in 1932.

During World War II, he left Norway aboard the M/B Haugen arriving at Lerwick in 1941. He subsequently served with the Free Norwegian forces in Scotland. After the liberation of Norway during 1945, he played a role in the design of Norwegian foreign and security policy. He served as state secretary in the Ministry of Defence from 1947 to 1950, in Gerhardsen's Second Cabinet, and in the Ministry of Foreign Affairs from 1954 to 1958, in the cabinets of Oscar Torp and Gerhardsen's Third Cabinet. After this, he served as Norwegian ambassador to various foreign capitals including Bonn (1954 to 1957) and Belgrade (1958-1963).

Bryn died at Tvedestrand during 1991 and was buried in Vestre Gravlund.
