= Petter Jakob Bjerve =

Norwegian politician (1913–2004)

Director of Statistics Norway
- In office 1949–1980
- Preceded by: Arne Skaug
- Succeeded by: Arne Øien

Minister of Finance and Customs
- In office 23 April 1960 – 4 February 1963
- Prime Minister: Einar Gerhardsen
- Preceded by: Trygve Bratteli
- Succeeded by: Andreas Cappelen

Personal details
- Born: 27 September 1913 Stjørdal Municipality, Nord-Trøndelag, Norway
- Died: 12 January 2004 (aged 90) Oslo, Norway
- Party: Labour
- Spouse: Rannveig Bremer

Petter Jakob Bjerve (27 September 1913 – 12 January 2004) was a Norwegian economist, statistician and politician for the Labour Party. Prominent positions include director of Statistics Norway from 1949 to 1980, Norwegian Minister of Finance from 1960 to 1963, and president of the International Statistical Institute from 1971 to 1975.

== Career ==
He was born in Stjørdal Municipality as a son of farmers Petter Jakob Bjerve, Sr. (1869–1928) and Kristine Arnstad (1870–1961). He married Rannveig Bremer, a daughter of Anders H. Bremer.

Bjerve attended secondary school in Orkdal Municipality, and was active in Clarté before joining the Labour Party. He studied under Ragnar Frisch at the University of Oslo, and graduated with the cand.oecon. degree in 1941. He studied at The American University, Washington DC from 1938 to 1939 and again in the US with a Rockefeller Foundation grant from 1947 to 1949. At the University of Oslo he worked as a research assistant from 1939 to 1940, teacher from 1941 to 1943 and research fellow from 1945 to 1949. He also held sporadic lectures between 1945 and 1960. He was also a visiting professor at Stanford University from 1954 to 1955. He was also a secretary in Statistics Norway from 1944 to 1945 and assistant secretary in the Norwegian Ministry of Finance. In 1949 he was hired as a director in Statistics Norway. He remained here until 1980. The exception was his period as Minister of Finance in Gerhardsen's Third Cabinet, from 23 April 1960 until his resignation on 4 February 1963. His doctorate thesis Planning in Norway 1947–1953 was finished in 1959, and he defended his thesis for the dr.philos. degree in 1962 while serving as Minister of Finance.

He was a prolific writer throughout his career. He was president of the International Statistical Institute from 1971 to 1975, and honorary member from 1986. He was an honorary member of Statistiska Föreningen in Stockholm from 1951, the Finnish Statistical Society from 1960, the American Statistical Association from 1964 and the Royal Statistical Society from 1967. In 1964 he was elected as a Fellow of the American Statistical Association.

He was a board member of Norsk Regnesentral from 1958 to 1960, of Institutt for anvendt sosialvitenskapelig forskning from 1966 to 1981, of Statsøkonomisk Forening from 1950 to 1953, 1963 to 1967 and 1971 to 1974. He chaired Sosialistiske økonomers forening from 1965 to 1967 and the Chr. Michelsen Institute department of social sciences from 1982 to 1984.

Bjerve was also an adviser for governments and banks of Zambia, Pakistan, Sri Lanka, Bangladesh, Portugal, Italy and Zimbabwe, partly with a United Nations and International Labour Organization connection. He also held other positions within the United Nations and OECD systems.

He was also a board member of Riksskattestyret from 1959 to 1963, Dag og Tid from 1965 to 1967 and Ja til EF 1972, and chairman of Livstrygdelaget Andvake from 1979 to 1985.
