= Karl Trasti =

Norwegian civil servant and politician

Minister of Industry
- In office 20 January 1964 – 12 October 1965
- Prime Minister: Einar Gerhardsen
- Preceded by: Trygve Lie
- Succeeded by: Sverre W. Rostoft

Minister of Pay and Prices
- In office 25 September 1963 – 20 January 1964
- Prime Minister: Einar Gerhardsen
- Preceded by: Ole Myrvoll
- Succeeded by: Idar Norstrand
- In office 1 September 1962 – 28 August 1963
- Prime Minister: Einar Gerhardsen
- Preceded by: Gunnar Bøe
- Succeeded by: Ole Myrvoll

Personal details
- Born: 19 February 1917 Vadsø, Finnmark, Norway
- Died: 4 October 1976 (aged 59)
- Party: Labour
- Occupation: Politician; Judge; Jurist

Karl Trasti (19 February 1917 - 4 October 1976) was a Norwegian civil servant and politician for the Labour Party.

During the third cabinet Gerhardsen he was appointed state secretary to the Minister of Finance in 1955, a post he held one year. He was later appointed Minister of Pay and Prices in 1962, and held that post to 1964 except for the month-long tenure of the cabinet Lyng in 1963. He then changed to Minister of Industry, but lost his job when the cabinet fell in 1965.

Born in Vadsø and graduating as cand.jur. in 1942, he notably worked as a judge during the legal purge after World War II. He was a secretary and consultant in the Ministry of Finance from 1943 to 1953, and director of the Norwegian Customs Authorities (named the Norwegian Customs and Excise Authorities from 1974) from 1957 to 1976, the year he died.

Trasti never held elected political office.

Political offices
Preceded by Gunnar Bøe	Norwegian Minister of Pay and Prices; 1962–August 1963	Succeeded by Ole Myrvoll
Preceded by Ole Myrvoll	Norwegian Minister of Pay and Prices; September 1963–1964	Succeeded by Idar Olav Norstrand
Preceded by Trygve Lie	Norwegian Minister of Industry; 1964–1965	Succeeded by Sverre Walter Rostoft
Civic offices
Preceded by Johs. Dannevig	Director of the Norwegian Customs Authorities; 1957–1974	Succeeded by position abolished
Preceded by position created	Director of the Norwegian Customs and Excise Authorities; 1974–1976	Succeeded by Jens Sterri
