= Idar Norstrand =

Norwegian politician

Minister of Pay and Prices
- In office 20 January 1964 – 12 October 1965
- Prime Minister: Einar Gerhardsen
- Preceded by: Karl Trasti
- Succeeded by: Dagfinn Vårvik

Personal details
- Born: Idar Olav Norstrand; 14 February 1915 Bergen, Hordaland, Norway
- Died: 8 September 1986 (aged 71)
- Party: Labour

Idar Olav Norstrand (14 February 1915, Bergen – 8 September 1986) was a Norwegian civil servant, trade unionist and politician for the Labour Party.

He worked as a mail carrier from 1934 to 1941, and later as personnel director in Norway Post from 1957 to 1982. From 1941 to 1945, during the German occupation of Norway, he fled to Stockholm, Sweden and worked at the Norwegian legation there. From 1946 to 1951 he chaired the trade union Norwegian Union of Postmen.

From 1964 to 1965, during the fourth cabinet Gerhardsen, he was appointed Minister of Wages and Prices.

Government offices
Preceded by Karl Trasti	Norwegian Minister of Wages and Prices; 1964–1965	Succeeded by Dagfinn Vårvik
Non-profit organization positions
Preceded by Oscar Røine	Chairman of the Norwegian Union of Postmen; 1946–1951	Succeeded by Eilif O. Eriksen
