= Magne Skodvin =

Norwegian historian

Magne Skodvin (13 December 1915 – 26 January 2004) was a Norwegian educator and historian.

== Biography ==
Skodvin was born in Ullensvang Municipality in Hordaland, Norway. He was the son of Anders Skodvin (1884–1938) and Karen Marie Haaland (1884–1958). Skodvin attended the Hardanger folkehøgskole from 1930 to 1931. In 1935, he took his final exams from the school (landsgymnas) in Vossevangen. During the Occupation of Norway by Nazi Germany during World War II, he participated in Norwegian resistance movement. He graduated with a cand.philol. degree at the University of Oslo in 1946 and took his doctorate in 1956 with the paper Striden om okkupasjonsstyret i Norge.

Skodvin work as a professor of history, first at the teacher's college in Trondheim (Trondheim lærerhøgskole) and from 1961 at the University of Oslo. He worked as a professor in history at the University of Oslo until 1983. He was the chairman of organization Noregs Mållag from 1958 to 1960, and editor of the cultural and political periodical Syn og Segn from 1951 to 1959. He was a member of the Royal Norwegian Society of Sciences and Letters (Det Kongelige Norske Videnskabers Selskab) from 1957 and the Norwegian Academy of Science and Letters (Det Norske Videnskaps-Akademi) from 1958.

== Personal life ==
He was married in 1943 to Eva These Tobiesen. Skodvin was appointed a Knight 1st Class of the Order of St. Olav in 1988.

== Bibliography ==
- Det store fremstøtet,(1948)
- Norges plass i Hitlers militære planar etter 7. juni 1940 (1949)
- Norsk okkupasjonshistorie i europeisk samanheng, i Nordisk Tidskrift (1951)
- Striden om okkupasjonsstyret i Norge (1956)
- Norden eller NATO (1971)
- Samtid og historie (1975)
- Som seilene fylles av stormen (1982)
- Krig og okkupasjon 1939–1945 (1990)

Cultural offices
Preceded by Hartvig Kiran	Chairman of Noregs Mållag; 1958–1960	Succeeded by Ivar Eskeland
