= Trygve Lie =

UN Secretary-General from 1946 to 1952

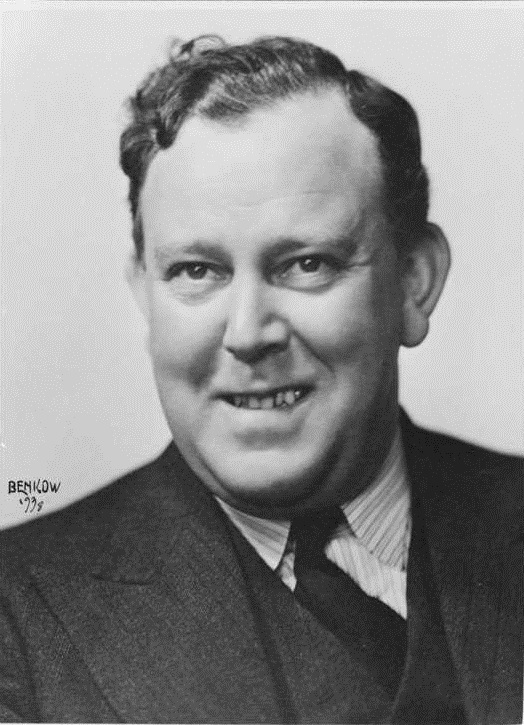
- Lie in 1938

1st Secretary-General of the United Nations
- In office 2 February 1946 – 10 November 1952
- Preceded by: Gladwyn Jebb (acting)
- Succeeded by: Dag Hammarskjöld

Minister of Foreign Affairs
- In office 19 November 1940 – 2 February 1946
- Prime Minister: Johan Nygaardsvold; Einar Gerhardsen
- Preceded by: Halvdan Koht
- Succeeded by: Halvard Lange

Minister of Justice
- In office 20 March 1935 – 1 July 1939
- Prime Minister: Johan Nygaardsvold
- Preceded by: Arne T. Sunde
- Succeeded by: Terje Wold

Minister of Industry
- In office 25 September 1963 – 20 January 1964
- Prime Minister: Einar Gerhardsen
- Preceded by: Kaare Meland
- Succeeded by: Karl Trasti
- In office 4 July 1963 – 28 August 1963
- Prime Minister: Einar Gerhardsen
- Preceded by: Kjell Holler
- Succeeded by: Kaare Meland

Minister of Trade and Shipping
- In office 20 January 1964 – 12 October 1965
- Prime Minister: Einar Gerhardsen
- Preceded by: Erik Himle
- Succeeded by: Kåre Willoch

Minister of Provisioning and Reconstruction
- In office 1 October 1939 – 21 February 1941
- Prime Minister: Johan Nygaardsvold
- Preceded by: Position established
- Succeeded by: Arne T. Sunde

Minister of Trade
- In office 1 July 1939 – 2 October 1939
- Prime Minister: Johan Nygaardsvold
- Preceded by: Alfred Madsen
- Succeeded by: Anders Frihagen

Member of the Norwegian Parliament
- In office 1 January 1937 – 31 December 1949
- Constituency: Oslo

Personal details
- Born: Trygve Halvdan Lie; 16 July 1896 Kristiania, Norway
- Died: 30 December 1968 (aged 72) Geilo, Buskerud, Norway
- Party: Labour
- Spouse: Hjørdis Jørgensen (m. 1921; died 1960)
- Children: 3
- Education: University of Oslo

Trygve Halvdan Lie (/liː/ LEE, Norwegian: [ˈtrʏ̂ɡvə ˈliː]; 16 July 1896 – 30 December 1968) was a Norwegian politician, labour leader, government official and author. He served as Norwegian foreign minister during the critical years of the Norwegian government in exile in London from 1940 to 1945. He was the first secretary-general of the United Nations.

== Early life ==
Lie was born in Kristiania (now Oslo) on 16 July 1896. His father, carpenter Martin Lie, left the family to emigrate to the United States in 1902 and was never heard from again. Trygve grew up under poor conditions together with his mother Hulda and a sister who was six at the time. His mother ran a boarding house and café in Grorud in Oslo.

Lie joined the Labour Party in 1911 and was named as the party's national secretary soon after receiving his law degree from the University of Oslo in 1919. Lie was editor-in-chief for Det 20de Aarhundre ('The 20th Century') from 1919 to 1921. From 1922 to 1935 he was a legal consultant for the Workers' National Trade Union (named Norwegian Confederation of Trade Unions from 1957). During this period, he acquired a reputation for settling disputes early and bringing test cases before the courts. He chaired the Norwegian Workers' Confederation of Sports from 1931 to 1935.

== Political career ==
In local politics he served as a member of the executive committee of Aker municipality council from 1922 to 1931. He was elected to the Norwegian Parliament from Akershus in 1937. He was appointed minister of justice when a Labour Party government was formed by Johan Nygaardsvold in 1935. Lie was later appointed minister of trade (July to October 1939) and minister of supplies (October 1939 to 1941).

A socialist from an early age, Lie once met Vladimir Lenin while on a Labour Party visit to Moscow and gave permission for Leon Trotsky to settle in Norway after he was exiled from the Soviet Union. However, because of pressure from Joseph Stalin, he forced Trotsky to leave the country.

When Nazi Germany invaded Norway in 1940, Lie ordered all Norwegian ships to sail to Allied ports. In 1941, Lie was named as foreign minister of the Norwegian government-in-exile, and he remained in this position until 1946.

=== United Nations career ===
Lie led the Norwegian delegation to the United Nations conference in San Francisco in 1945 and was a leader in drafting the provisions of the United Nations Security Council. He was the leader of the Norwegian delegation to the United Nations General Assembly in 1946. Lie first stood for the election for president of the General Assembly but lost to Paul-Henri Spaak of Belgium. After in January 1946 the Soviet Union opposed the Canadian candidate Lester B. Pearson due to him being a North American and the UN headquarters were also in North America, and the United States opposed both Soviet candidates, those being the Yugoslav ambassador to Washington Stanoye Simic and Wincenty Rzymowski, the foreign minister of Poland, the United States eventually produced Lie as the candidate, to which both powers agreed. He was elected as the first secretary-general of the United Nations by a unanimous vote in the Security Council and by a 46–3 vote in the General Assembly. As the first person to occupy the new position, he would help come to shape the role as it developed in international diplomacy.

As secretary-general, Lie appointed, among others, Jan Pedersen, Raymond Fourier, Oskar Larsen and a wide variety of officials to the positions of under-secretaries-general or special advisors during his tenure, with a tendency to prefer individuals he had previously worked with. Lie supported the foundations of Israel and Indonesia. His passionate support for Israel included passing secret military and diplomatic information to Israeli officials. He sent 50 members of the United Nations guard force from Lake Success to assist the mediator in supervising the truce in the former British Mandate of Palestine in 1948, and the "UNTSO", the first peacekeeping operation, was established by the United Nations. He worked for the withdrawal of Soviet forces in Iran during the Iran crisis of 1946 and a ceasefire in fighting in Kashmir. Regarding Iran, Lies' memorandum on a potential solution was not implemented, but, as a result of the need for raising important issues, the Security Council changed its rules of procedures to enable the secretary general to address it on any question under consideration. This change would have important consequences both for Lie with regards to the Korean War as well as for later secretaries-general.

Lie advocated for the creation of the UN Guard, a non-military force of "1,000–5,000 men, largely drawn from the smaller member states, to be recruited by the Secretary-General and placed at the disposal of the Security Council, the General Assembly, and the Trusteeship Council."

In 1948, Lie was involved in mediation attempts between Russia and the West following the Berlin Blockade. In June 1948, he offered to raise the blockade to the UN Security Council as a 'threat to the peace' but was told by the US State Department that this was not necessary. In November 1948, he recommended that the UN attempt to work out the currency issue and present a solution to both sides. However, in this regard he was not successful, as Stalin eventually ordered the lifting of the blockade in May 1949 in response to the effects of a trade embargo and the subsequent ongoing success of the Allied airlift operation.

Lie was Secretary-General of the UN during the period of the Korean War. Following the June 25, 1950, attack by North Korean forces, Lie immediately invoked Article 99 of the UN Charter to convene the Security Council that day. He stated that as Korea was a ward of the UN, the invasion was an attack on the UN itself and that the Security Council should take the necessary steps to reestablish peace. A resolution to that effect passed in the Council by 9–0, owing to the absence of the Soviet Union due to the Soviet Union boycott of the United Nations. It is stated that this attracted the ire of the Soviet Union. During the war, Lie had wanted an international committee to direct military forces, but this was opposed by the US, and a compromise was reached whereby a unified UN command would be created but under the overall command of a US general. He has been criticised by some for his failures to bring about a swifter end to the Korean War, despite several repeated attempts to bring the People's Republic of China to ceasefire negotiations.

On 1 November 1950, over objections by the Soviet Union, the UN General Assembly voted by 46 votes to five (and eight abstentions) to extend Lie's term of office. The vote was a consequence of an impasse in the Security Council in which the Soviet Union refused to consider Lie due to his involvement in the Korean War, while the US refused to accept any candidate except Lie. Lie later worked to end the Soviet boycott of UN meetings, though his involvement had little to do with the eventual return of the Soviet Union to the UN. He was opposed to Spain's entry into the United Nations because of his opposition to Francisco Franco's government. He also sought to have the People's Republic of China recognized by the United Nations after the Nationalist government was exiled to Taiwan, arguing that the People's Republic was the only government that could fulfill the membership obligations in full.

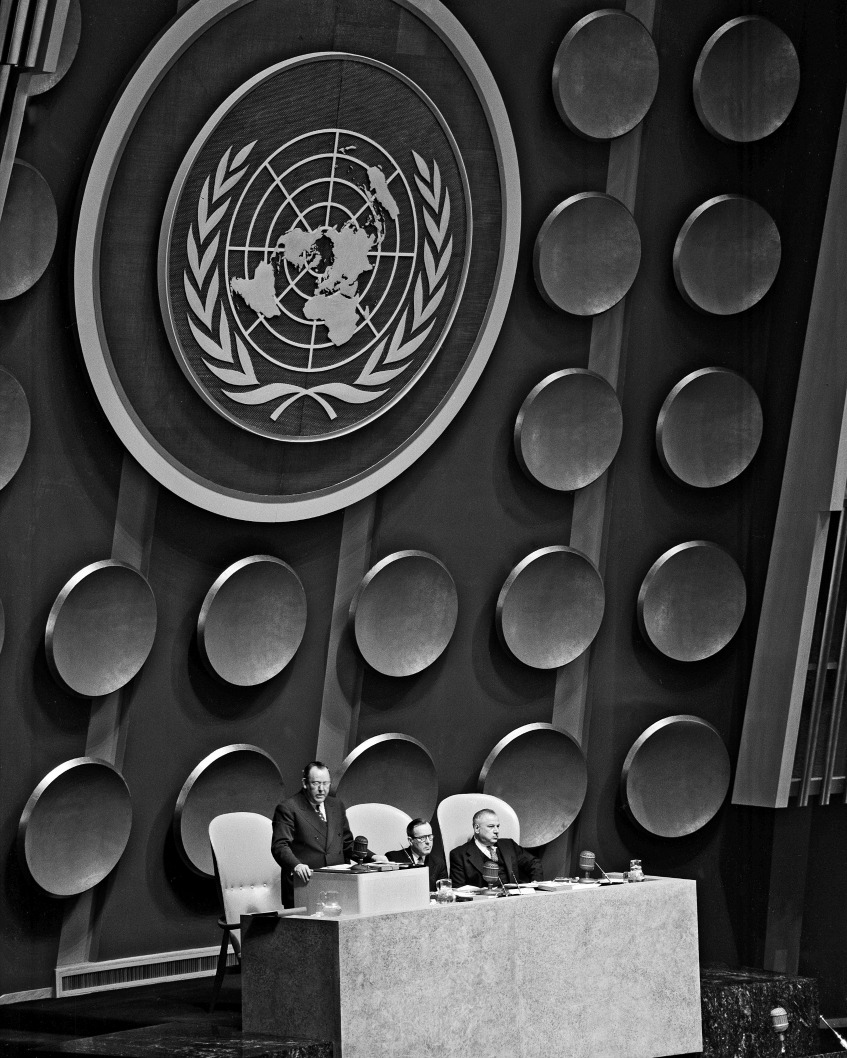
Resignation of Lie in November 1952

By late 1952, the USSR continued to refuse to acknowledge Lie as secretary-general and, having also been accused by Joseph McCarthy of hiring "disloyal" Americans – an allegation that he attributed to the pressing need for UN civil servants following the establishment of the UN – Lie resigned on 10 November 1952.

The UN came under US official scrutiny after the conviction of Alger Hiss, who had served as acting secretary general at the first convening of the UN in San Francisco (in 1945). A State Department report dated 17 January 1951, states:

Subject: McCarran Act—Possible Conflict with Headquarters Agreement
In conversation with Abe Feller in New York recently he expressed the view that the regulations which have been issued under the McCarran Act make it fairly clear to him that there is likely to be some conflict between that Act and the way in which it is being interpreted and the Headquarters Agreement. He expressed the view that in the event of such conflict the UN secretariat would be forced to resort to the arbitration procedure under the Agreement. He stated he thought this would be very unfortunate and wondered whether any consideration was being given to a general amendment to the McCarran Act which would waive its provisions so far as it conflicted with international obligations or international agreements. I told him I did not know whether any amendments were under consideration but that I would bring his view to your attention.

Abraham Feller, general counsel and principal director, Legal Department, United Nations Secretariat, was reportedly a close friend of Alger Hiss. On 14 November 1952, just days after Lie's resignation from the UN, Feller died by suicide, jumping out of the window of his apartment in New York City.

=== After the United Nations ===
Lie remained active in Norwegian politics after his resignation from the UN. He was the county governor of Oslo and Akershus, chairman of the Board of Energy, minister of industry, and minister of trade and shipping. He wrote a number of books, including In the Cause of Peace, an account of his years at the UN.

== Personal life and death ==
Lie married Hjørdis Jørgensen (1898–1960) in 1921. The couple had three daughters: Sissel, Guri, and Mette.

Lie died on 30 December 1968 of a heart attack in Geilo, Norway. He was 72 years old.

== Awards ==
Trygve Lie was awarded a large number of Norwegian and foreign orders. Among these were the Norwegian highest civilian award Medal for Outstanding Civic Service (Medaljen for borgerdåd) (1966), the Grand Cross of the Order of Dannebrog (1954) and Grand Cross of the Order of St. Olav (1953), and the Czechoslovak OWL (1948). He was awarded numerous honorary doctorates by universities throughout the U.S. and Europe. Trygve Lie was the holder of a number of other orders, decorations and other honors.

== Legacy ==
Some scholars rank him at the bottom of all UN secretaries-general; one who "presided over a long list of diplomatic failures, tarnished the UN, and accomplished very little". On the other hand, some scholars argue that Trygve Lie built the United Nations organisation from nothing, with the organization establishing a physical presence in a huge office building in New York, after having started in a small temporary office on Long Island. This included leading the UN response to a number of challenging post–World War II conflicts and issues related to the wider Cold War. As the first secretary-general of the UN, Lie would have a pivotal role in first helping shape that position as well as of the wider role of the UN.

"Trygve Lie's Square" is located in Furuset center in Oslo. In the square stands the bronze statue of Trygve Lie, which was created by the Norwegian artist Nicolaus Widerberg and erected in 1994. Trygve Lie Gallery and Trygve Lie Plaza are both located in New York City.

== Selected works ==
- Den nye arbeidstvistlov, 1933
- De forente nasjoner, 1949
- Syv år for freden, 1954 (published in English as In the Cause of Peace: Seven Years with the United Nations)
- Internasjonal politikk, 1955
- Leve eller dø. Norge i krig, 1955
- Med England i ildlinjen 1940–42, 1956
- Hjemover, 1958
- Oslo–Moskva–London, 1968

Source: Trygve Lie in libraries (WorldCat catalog)

== General and cited sources ==
- Gaglione, Anthony (2001). The United Nations under Trygve Lie, 1945-1953. The Scarecrow Press, Inc. ISBN 978-0-8108-3698-3.
- Barros, James (1989). Trygve Lie and the Cold War: The UN Secretary-General Pursues Peace, 1946-1953. Northern Illinois Univ Press. ISBN 978-0-87580-148-3.

Positions in intergovernmental organisations
Preceded by Gladwyn Jebb (acting)	United Nations Secretary-General; February 1946 – November 1952	Succeeded by Dag Hammarskjöld
Political offices
Preceded by Arne Sunde	Norwegian Minister of Justice and the Police; 1935–1939	Succeeded by Terje Wold
Preceded by Alfred Martin Madsen	Norwegian Minister of Trade; July–October 1939	Succeeded by Anders Frihagen
Preceded by position created	Norwegian Minister of Supplies; October 1939 – 1941	Succeeded by Arne Sunde
Preceded by Halvdan Koht	Norwegian Minister of Foreign Affairs; 1940–1946 (acting 1940–1941)	Succeeded by Halvard Lange
Preceded by Carl Platou	County Governor of Oslo and Akershus; 1955–1963	Succeeded by John Lyng
Preceded by Kjell Holler	Norwegian Minister of Industry; July–August 1963	Succeeded by Kaare Meland
Preceded by Kaare Meland	Norwegian Minister of Industry; September 1963 – 1964	Succeeded by Karl Trasti
Preceded by Erik Himle	Norwegian Minister of Trade and Shipping; 1964–1965	Succeeded by Kåre Willoch
