= Erik Stai =

Norwegian high jumper

Erik Stai (29 November 1915 – 4 March 2004) was a Norwegian high jumper. He represented the club IF Vestheim.

He finished fourth at the 1938 European Championships with a jump of 1.90 metres. He never participated in the Summer Olympics. He became Norwegian champion in 1938 and 1939, but his career was interrupted by World War II in Norway 1940–1945.

His career best jump was 2.00 metres, achieved in September 1940 at Bislett stadion.
