= Sivert Andreas Nielsen (1916–2004) =

Norwegian civil servant

Sivert Andreas Nielsen (24 November 1916 – 17 March 2004) was a Norwegian diplomat, civil servant, state secretary and banker. He is known for shaping Norwegian defence policy in the 1950s, and as ambassador to the United Nations.

== Early life and career ==
He was born in Copenhagen as a son of professor Konrad Nielsen (1875–1953) and his wife Gudrun Agnes Augusta Müller (1889–1954). He was a paternal grandson of politician Sivert Andreas Nielsen. The family moved to Vettakollen when Nielsen was one year old. He finished his secondary education in 1934, and graduated with the cand.jur. degree in 1940. He also fought in the Norwegian Campaign of the same year. During the subsequent German occupation of Norway, he was arrested by the Nazi occupant authorities in 1941. He was imprisoned at Møllergata 19 from 2 April to 28 June 1941, and then in Grini concentration camp until 15 November. He was then incarcerated in Sachsenhausen concentration camp until March 1945. In December 1945 he married Harriet Eyde (1922–1986).

== Later career ==
After the war he served as a diplomat to the United Nations from 1946 to 1948 and to the United States from 1948 to 1950. Among others, he helped shape and write the North Atlantic Treaty which was ratified in 1949. He then worked in the Ministry of Defence, as assistant secretary from 1950, deputy under-secretary of state from 1952 and State Secretary from 1955 to 1958. In the latter position he was a part of the third cabinet Gerhardsen; however he was not a member of the Norwegian Labour Party. In his time it was speculated that he was offered a government minister position, but this never happened. From 1958 to 1966 he returned as Norwegian ambassador to the United Nations. During this period, Norway was a member of the Security Council in 1963 and 1964.

From 1966 to 1976 he worked as a banker. He was also the chair of the Norwegian Agency for Development Cooperation from 1969 to 1974. He was decorated as a Knight of the Royal Norwegian Order of St. Olav in 1964, and died in March 2004 in Oslo.
