= Reidar Alveberg =

Norwegian bobsledder (1916–2004)

Reidar Alveberg (June 20, 1916 – December 12, 2004) was a Norwegian bobsledder who competed in the 1950s. He finished 13th in the four-man event at the 1952 Winter Olympics in Oslo.

He was born in Berg and died in Oslo.
