= Lyng cabinet =

Government of Norway in 1963

Lyng's Cabinet
- Cabinet of Norway

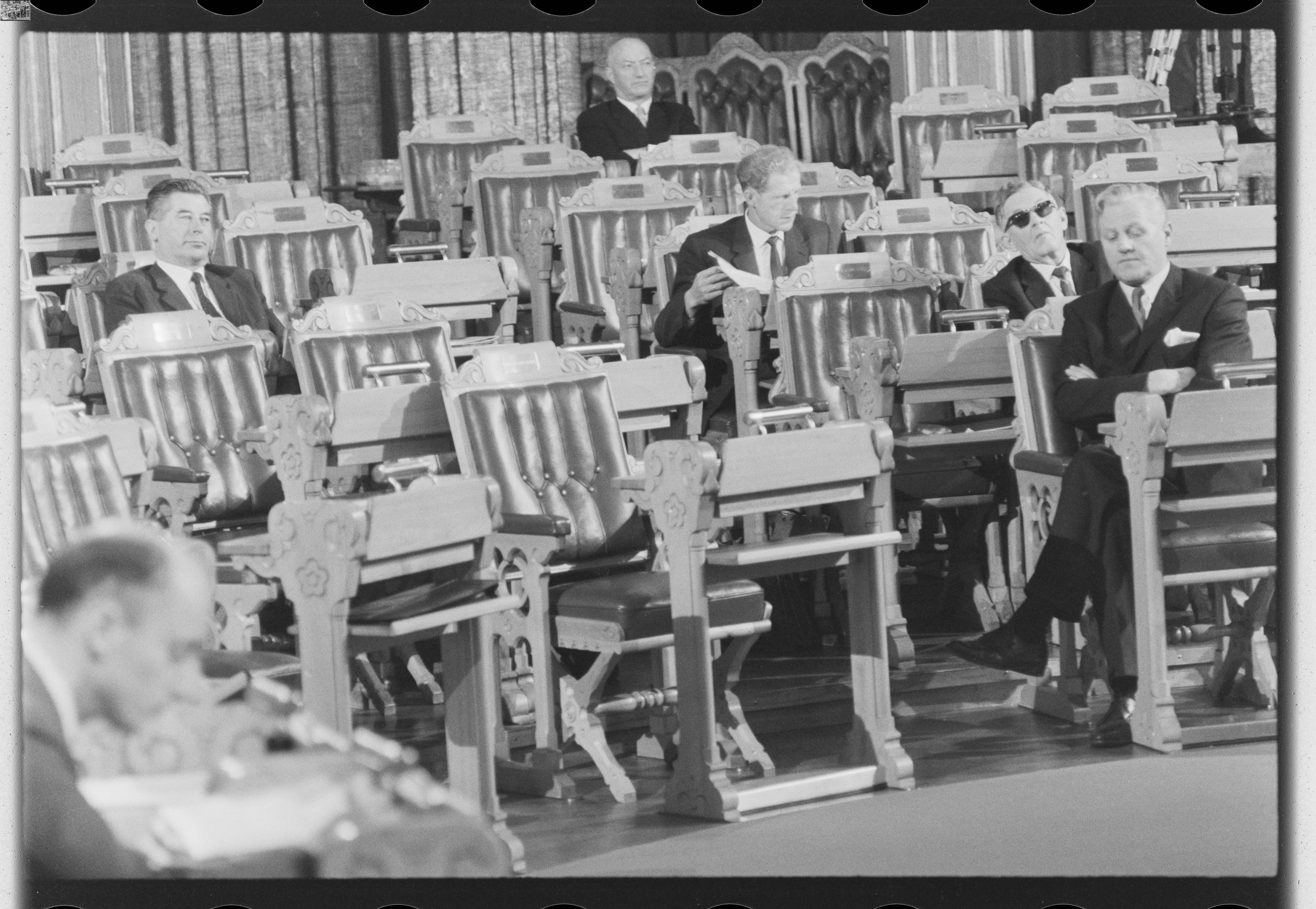
- Prime Minister Lyng (first row, to the far right) in the Storting five days before his cabinet fell.
- Date formed: 28 August 1963
- Date dissolved: 25 September 1963

People and organisations
- King: Olav V of Norway
- Prime Minister: John Lyng
- No. of ministers: 15
- Member party: Conservative Party; Liberal Party; Christian Democratic Party; Centre Party
- Status in legislature: Coalition (minority)

History
- Predecessor: Gerhardsen's Third Cabinet
- Successor: Gerhardsen's Fourth Cabinet

The Lyng Cabinet is a government cabinet which governed Norway between August 28, 1963 and September 25, 1963. It was the first cabinet in 28 years not to be led by the Norwegian Labour Party. It was a centre-right coalition government of the Conservative Party, Centre Party, Christian Democratic Party and Liberal Party, led by John Lyng of the Conservative Party. It had fifteen members, of which five were from the Conservative Party, four were from the Centre Party, three were from the Christian Democratic Party and three were from the Liberal Party. Karen Grønn-Hagen was the cabinet's only female member.

After the Socialist People's Party joined a no-confidence vote against Einar Gerhardsen's government, Lyng realized that between them, the non-Labour parties were only one seat short of a majority in the Storting. He quickly got the non-Labour parties to form a coalition government, which took office on August 28 after the SF abstained. The SF, however, threw its support back to Gerhardsen a month later, allowing Labour to return to power. Nonetheless, the brief Lyng government proved that the non-Labour parties were capable of governing after three decades of Labour rule.

== Cabinet members ==
Cabinet
Portfolio	Minister	Took office	Left office	Party
Prime Minister	John Lyng	28 August 1963	25 September 1963	Conservative
Minister of Foreign Affairs	Erling Wikborg	28 August 1963	25 September 1963	Christian Democratic
Minister of Defence	Håkon Kyllingmark	28 August 1963	25 September 1963	Conservative
Minister of Industry	Kaare Meland	28 August 1963	25 September 1963	Conservative
Minister of Finance and Customs	Dagfinn Vårvik	28 August 1963	25 September 1963	Centre
Minister of Pay and Prices	Ole Myrvoll	28 August 1963	25 September 1963	Liberal
Minister of Local Government and Labour	Bjarne Lyngstad	28 August 1963	25 September 1963	Liberal
Minister of Social Affairs	Kjell Bondevik	28 August 1963	25 September 1963	Christian Democratic
Minister of Transport and Communications	Lars Leiro	28 August 1963	25 September 1963	Centre
Minister of Trade and Shipping	Kåre Willoch	28 August 1963	25 September 1963	Conservative
Minister of Fisheries	Onar Onarheim	28 August 1963	25 September 1963	Conservative
Minister of Agriculture	Hans Borgen	28 August 1963	25 September 1963	Centre
Minister of Justice and the Police	Petter Mørch Koren	28 August 1963	25 September 1963	Christian Democratic
Minister of Family and Consumer Affairs	Karen Grønn-Hagen	28 August 1963	25 September 1963	Centre
Minister of Education and Church Affairs	Olaf Kortner	28 August 1963	25 September 1963	Liberal

== State Secretaries ==
Ministry	State Secretary	Period (Note: Unless otherwise noted, the period was 28 August - 25 September 1963.)	Party
Office of the Prime Minister	Ivar Johansen		Conservative
Office of the Prime Minister	Paul Thyness		Conservative
Ministry of Foreign Affairs	Tomas Torsvik		Christian Democratic
Ministry of Defence	Arne Gunnar Lund		Conservative
Ministry of Industry	Torkild Wilhelm Schøyen		Conservative
Ministry of Social Affairs	Odd Steinar Holøs		Christian Democratic
Ministry of Transport and Communications	Bjørn Unneberg		Centre
Ministry of Agriculture	Teddy Dyring		Centre
Ministry of Church Affairs and Education	Magne Lerheim		Liberal
