= Norwegian Board of Health Supervision =

The Norwegian Board of Health Supervision (Norwegian: Statens helsetilsyn, short name Helsetilsynet) is a national government institution under the Norwegian Ministry of Health and Care Services.

The Norwegian Board of Health Supervision is an independent supervision authority, with responsibility for general supervision of child protection, health and social services in the country. The Norwegian Board of Health Supervision directs the supervision authorities at the county level: the Offices of the County Governors.
