= Minister of Trade and Industry (Norway) =

Norwegian cabinet position

Minister of Trade and Industry of Norway
- Næringsminister

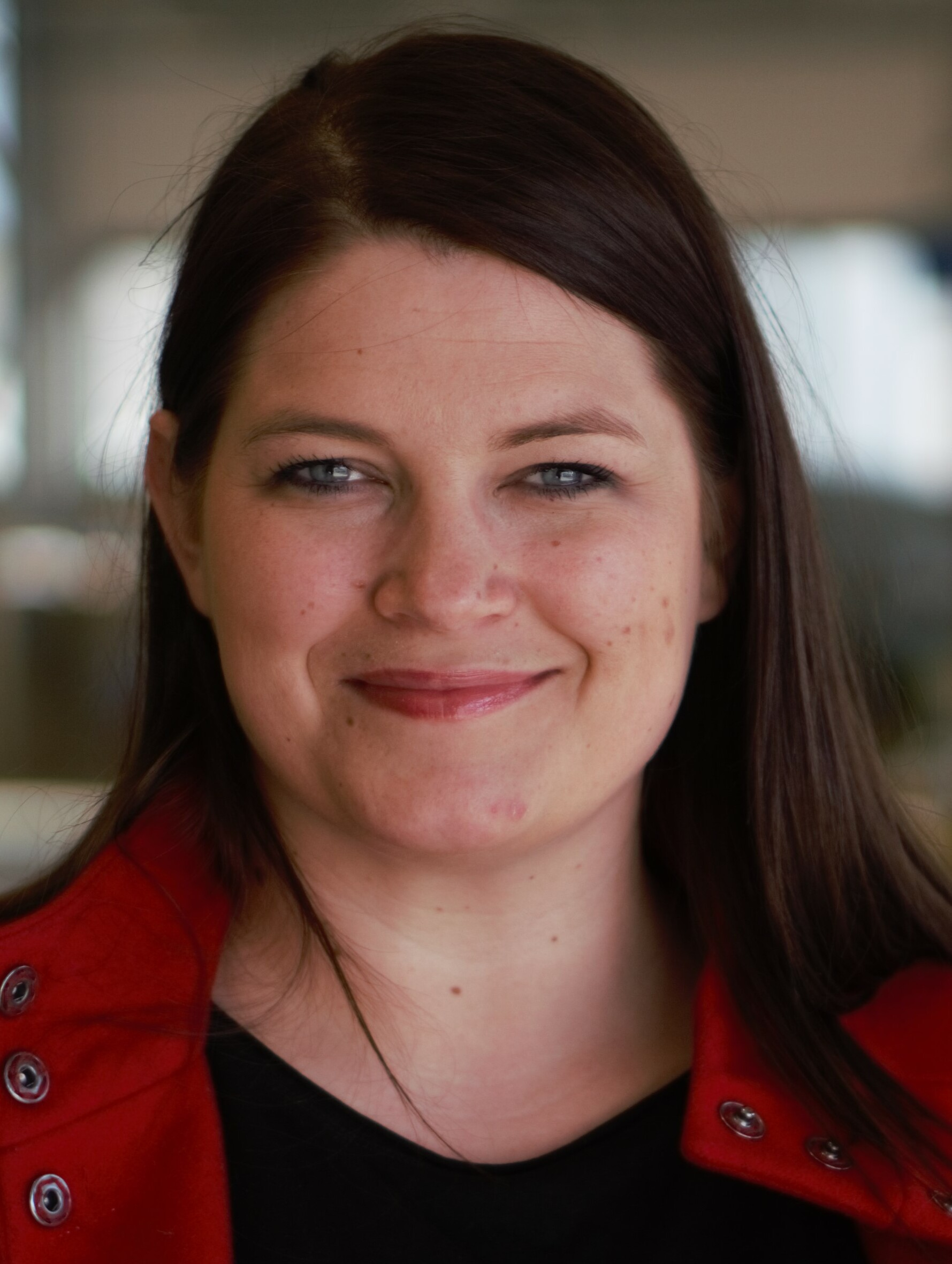
- Incumbent; Cecilie Myrseth since 19 April 2024
- Ministry of Trade, Industry and Fisheries
- Member of: Council of State
- Seat: Oslo
- Nominator: Prime Minister
- Appointer: Monarch; With approval of Parliament
- Term length: No fixed length
- Constituting instrument: Constitution of Norway
- Formation: 1 January 1903
- First holder: Otto Blehr
- Deputy: State secretaries for the Minister of Trade and Industry
- Website: Official website

The Minister of Trade and Industry (Norwegian: Næringsminister) is a councilor of state in the Ministry of Trade, Industry and Fisheries. The incumbent minister is Cecilie Myrseth of the Labour Party which served since April 2024.

The position was created 1 January 1903 as Minister of Trade and has changed name several times throughout its history. The position has since kept its current title since 1997.

The Ministry of Trade and Industry was abolished in January 2014, but the minister post was kept, and now heads responsibilities for trade and industry in the new Ministry of Trade, Industry and Fisheries, alongside the Minister of Fishieries and Ocean Policy.

== Ministers ==
Key
Conservative Party
Agrarian Party
Free-minded Liberal Party
Labour Party
Labour Democrats
Liberal Party

=== Ministers of Trade (1903–1945) ===
Photo	Name	Party	Took office	Left office	Tenure	Cabinet
	Otto Blehr	Liberal	1 January 1903	22 October 1903	294 days	Blehr I
	Jacob Schøning	Liberal	22 October 1903	1 September 1904	315 days	Hagerup II
	Paul B. Vogt	Conservative	1 September 1904	11 March 1905	191 days	Hagerup II
	Sofus Arctander	Liberal	11 March 1905	19 March 1908	3 years, 8 days	Michelsen; Løvland
	Lars Abrahamsen	Liberal	19 March 1908	2 February 1910	1 year, 320 days	Knudsen I
	Sofus Arctander	Free-minded Liberal	2 February 1910	11 June 1910	129 days	Konow
	Bernhard Brænne	Conservative	11 June 1910	20 February 1912	1 year, 254 days	Konow
	Ambortius Lindvig	Free-minded Liberal	20 February 1912	31 January 1913	346 days	Bratlie
	Johan Castberg	Labour Democrats	31 January 1913	1 July 1913	151 days	Knudsen II
	Kristian Friis Petersen	Liberal	1 October 1916	20 February 1919	2 years, 142 days	Knudsen II
	Birger Stuevold-Hansen	Liberal	20 February 1919	21 June 1920	1 year, 122 days	Knudsen II
	Gerdt Henrik Meyer Bruun	Conservative	21 June 1920	22 June 1921	1 year, 1 day	Bahr Halvorsen I
	Johan Ludwig Mowinckel	Liberal	22 June 1921	20 October 1922 (Note: Acting until 20 October while serving as foreign minister.)	1 year, 120 days	Blehr II
	Lars Oftedal	Liberal	20 October 1922	6 March 1923	135 days	Blehr II
	Johan Rye Holmboe	Free-minded Liberal	6 March 1923	25 July 1924	1 year, 141 days	Bahr Halvorsen II; Berge
	Lars O. Meling	Liberal	25 July 1924	5 March 1926	1 year, 223 days	Mowinckel I
	Charles Robertson	Conservative	5 March 1926	28 January 1928	1 year, 329 days	Lykke
	Anton L. Alvestad	Labour	28 January 1928	15 February 1928	18 days	Hornsrud
	Lars Oftedal	Liberal	15 February 1928	12 May 1931	3 years, 86 days	Mowinckel II
	Per Larssen	Agrarian	12 May 1931	14 March 1932	307 days	Kolstad
	Ivar Kirkeby-Garstad	Agrarian	14 March 1932	3 March 1933	354 days	Hundseid
	Lars O. Meling	Liberal	3 March 1933	20 March 1935	2 years, 17 days	Mowinckel III
	Alfred Madsen	Labour	20 March 1935	1 July 1939	4 years, 103 days	Nygaardsvold
	Trygve Lie	Labour	1 July 1939	2 October 1939	93 days	Nygaardsvold
	Anders Frihagen	Labour	2 October 1939	7 June 1940	249 days	Nygaardsvold
	Terje Wold	Labour	7 June 1940	15 April 1942	1 year, 312 days	Nygaardsvold
	Anders Frihagen	Labour	15 April 1942	1 October 1942	169 days	Nygaardsvold
	Olav Hindahl	Labour	1 October 1942	12 March 1945	2 years, 162 days	Nygaardsvold
	Sven Nielsen	Conservative	12 March 1945	25 June 1945	105 days	Nygaardsvold

=== Ministers of Industry (1945–1993) ===
Photo	Name	Party	Took office	Left office	Tenure	Cabinet	Ref
	Lars Evensen (Note: Arne Drogseth was acting minister for Evensen from 29 June to 11 November 1951. Erik Brofoss was also acting minister for Evensen from 18 May to 15 September 1953.)	Labour	25 June 1945	2 November 1953	8 years, 130 days	Gerhardsen I-II; Torp	
	Nils Handal	Labour	2 November 1953	22 January 1955	1 year, 81 days	Torp	
	Gustav Sjaastad	Labour	22 January 1955	9 April 1959	4 years, 77 days	Gerhardsen III	
	Kjell Holler	Labour	9 April 1959	4 July 1963	4 years, 86 days	Gerhardsen III	
	Trygve Lie	Labour	4 July 1963	28 August 1963	55 days	Gerhardsen III	
	Kaare Meland	Conservative	28 August 1963	25 September 1963	28 days	Lyng	
	Trygve Lie	Labour	25 September 1963	20 January 1964	117 days	Gerhardsen IV	
	Karl Trasti	Labour	20 January 1964	12 October 1965	1 year, 265 days	Gerhardsen IV	
	Sverre W. Rostoft	Conservative	12 October 1965	17 March 1971	5 years, 156 days	Borten	
	Finn Lied	Labour	17 March 1971	18 October 1972	1 year, 215 days	Bratteli I	
	Ola Skjåk Bræk	Liberal	18 October 1972	16 October 1973	363 days	Korvald	
	Ingvald J. Ulvseth	Labour	16 October 1973	15 January 1976	2 years, 91 days	Bratteli II	
	Bjartmar Gjerde	Labour	15 January 1976	11 January 1978	1 year, 361 days	Nordli	
	Olav Haukvik	Labour	11 January 1978	8 October 1979	1 year, 270 days	Nordli	
	Lars Skytøen	Labour	8 October 1979	4 February 1981	1 year, 119 days	Nordli	
	Finn Kristensen	Labour	4 February 1981	14 October 1981	252 days	Brundtland I	
	Jens-Halvard Bratz	Conservative	14 October 1981	16 September 1983	1 year, 337 days	Willoch I–II	
	Jan P. Syse	Conservative	16 September 1983	4 October 1985	2 years, 18 days	Willoch II	
	Petter Thomassen	Conservative	4 October 1985	9 May 1986	217 days	Willoch II	
	Finn Kristensen	Labour	9 May 1986	16 October 1989	3 years, 160 days	Brundtland II	
	Petter Thomassen	Conservative	16 October 1989	3 November 1990	1 year, 18 days	Syse	
	Ole Knapp	Labour	3 November 1990	4 September 1992	1 year, 306 days	Brundtland III	
	Finn Kristensen	Labour	4 September 1992	1 January 1993	119 days	Brundtland III	

=== Ministers of Industry and Energy (1993–1997) ===
Photo	Name	Party	Took office	Left office	Tenure	Cabinet	Ref
	Finn Kristensen	Labour	1 January 1993	7 October 1993	273 days	Brundtland III	
	Jens Stoltenberg	Labour	7 October 1993	25 October 1996	3 years, 18 days	Brundtland III	
	Grete Knudsen	Labour	25 October 1996	1 January 1997	68 days	Jagland (Note: Minister responsible for energy cases.)	

=== Ministers of Trade and Industry (1997–present) ===
Photo	Name	Party	Took office	Left office	Tenure	Cabinet	Ref
	Grete Knudsen	Labour	1 January 1997	17 October 1997	289 days	Jagland	
	Lars Sponheim	Liberal	17 October 1997	17 March 2000	2 years, 152 days	Bondevik I	
	Grete Knudsen	Labour	17 March 2000	19 October 2001	1 year, 216 days	Stoltenberg I	
	Ansgar Gabrielsen	Conservative	19 October 2001	18 June 2004	2 years, 243 days	Bondevik II	
	Børge Brende	Conservative	18 June 2004	17 October 2005	1 year, 121 days	Bondevik II	
	Odd Eriksen	Labour	17 October 2005	29 September 2006	347 days	Stoltenberg II	
	Dag Terje Andersen	Labour	29 September 2006	20 June 2008	1 year, 273 days	Stoltenberg II	
	Sylvia Brustad	Labour	20 June 2008	20 October 2009	1 year, 122 days	Stoltenberg II	
	Trond Giske	Labour	20 October 2009	16 October 2013	3 years, 361 days	Stoltenberg II	
	Monica Mæland	Conservative	16 October 2013	17 January 2018	4 years, 93 days	Solberg	
	Torbjørn Røe Isaksen	Conservative	17 January 2018	24 January 2020	2 years, 7 days	Solberg	
	Iselin Nybø	Liberal	24 January 2020	14 October 2021	1 year, 263 days	Solberg	
	Jan Christian Vestre	Labour	14 October 2021	19 April 2024	2 years, 188 days	Støre	
	Cecilie Myrseth	Labour	19 April 2024	present	2 years, 142 days	Støre	

== See also ==
- Minister of Trade and Shipping (Norway)
