= Bræk =

Bræk is a Norwegian surname. Notable people with the surname include:

- Lise Skjåk Bræk (born 1941), Norwegian textile artist, daughter of Ola
- Ola Skjåk Bræk (1912–1999), Norwegian banker and politician
