= Gunnar Jahn =

Norwegian politician (1883–1971)

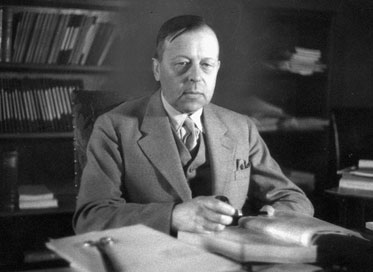
- Jahn in 1946.

Governor of the Central Bank of Norway
- In office 1946–1954
- Preceded by: Nicolai Rygg
- Succeeded by: Erik Brofoss

Minister of Finance
- In office 25 June 1945 – 5 November 1945
- Prime Minister: Einar Gerhardsen
- Preceded by: Paul Hartmann
- Succeeded by: Erik Brofoss
- In office 3 November 1934 – 20 March 1935
- Prime Minister: J. L. Mowinckel
- Preceded by: Per Berg Lund
- Succeeded by: Adolf Indrebø

Chair of the Nobel Committee
- In office 5 November 1945 – 31 December 1966
- Preceded by: C. J. Hambro
- Succeeded by: Nils Langhelle
- In office 15 November 1941 – 31 December 1942
- Preceded by: Fredrik Stang
- Succeeded by: C. J. Hambro (1945)

Personal details
- Born: 10 January 1883 Trondhjem, Sør-Trøndelag, Sweden-Norway
- Died: 31 January 1971 (aged 88) Oslo, Norway
- Party: Liberal; Resistance
- Spouse: Martha Larsen Jahn

Gunnar Jahn (10 January 1883 – 31 January 1971) was a Norwegian jurist, economist, statistician, politician for the Liberal Party and resistance member. He held several important positions, such as Norwegian Minister of Finance and Customs from 1934 to 1935 and in 1945, chair of the Norwegian Nobel Committee from 1941 to 1966 and Governor of the Central Bank of Norway from 1946 to 1954.

== Life and work ==
He was born in Trondheim, the son of director Christian Fredy Michael Jahn (1837–1914) and Elisabeth Wilhelmine Wexelsen (1853–1930). He was a grandson of Vilhelm Andreas Wexelsen, a grandnephew of Marie Wexelsen and a first cousin of Per Kvist. He finished his secondary education at Trondheim Cathedral School in 1902 graduated from the Royal Frederick University with the cand.jur. degree in 1907. He worked as a deputy judge in Lofoten before enrolling at the university again; he graduated in economics in 1909. He was hired in Statistics Norway in 1910. In April 1911 he married Martha Larsen Jahn.

From 1913 he was a teacher at Kristiania Commerce School and the university, jobs he left in 1918 and 1920 respectively. From 1917 to 1919 he worked in Rasjoneringsdirektoratet, and from 1919 to 1920 he was the director there. In 1920 he became director of Statistics Norway. He was a member of the Norwegian Academy of Science and Letters from 1927. From November 1934 to March 1935 he was the Minister of Finance and Customs in Mowinckel's Third Cabinet. He became a member of the Norwegian Nobel Committee in 1937, and chairman from 1941 to 1966.

In 1940 he was a member of the Administrative Council, which tried to maintain Norwegian political governance despite the German invasion and occupation of Norway. He marked himself as a strong proponent of resistance to Germany, and was a member of the central leadership of the resistance: "Kretsen" and Hjemmefrontens Ledelse. He was arrested by the Nazi authorities on 25 October 1944, and incarcerated at Akershus Fortress until 8 December. He was then sent to Grini concentration camp, where he sat until the liberation of Norway.

After the German surrender, he saw himself as a candidate to become Prime Minister of Norway, but Hjemmefrontens Ledelse chose Paal Berg as their candidate. He instead became Minister of Finance and Customs of the Norwegian interim government, Gerhardsen's First Cabinet, on 25 June. He remained so until 4 November the same year, and also served on the Board of Governors in the International Bank for Reconstruction and Development and the International Monetary Fund in 1945. He then headed the Central Bank of Norway from 1946 to 1954. He presided over the International Statistical Institute from 1947 to 1951, and was an honorary member. As the Chairman of the Nobel Committee, he delivered the Presentation Speech to The Nobel Peace Prize 1947 to the Quaker Friends Service Council (British) and American Friends Service Committee (http://www.nobelprize.org/nobel_prizes/peace/laureates/1947/press.html). He was also a member of the Liberal Party's national board for some time. He died in January 1971 in Oslo.

== U Thant controversy ==
In 1965, UN Secretary General U Thant was informed by the Norwegian Permanent Representative to the UN that he would be awarded that year's Nobel Peace Prize and asked whether or not he would accept. He consulted staff and later replied that he would. At the same time, Jahn, who was Chairman of the Nobel Peace Prize committee, lobbied heavily against giving U Thant the prize and the prize was at the last minute awarded to UNICEF. The rest of the committee all wanted the prize to go to U Thant, for his work in defusing the Cuban Missile Crisis, ending the war in the Congo, and his ongoing work to mediate an end to the Vietnam War. The disagreement lasted three years and in 1966 and 1967 no prize was given, with Jahn effectively vetoing an award to U Thant.

Political offices
| Preceded by Per Berg Lund | Norwegian Minister of Finance and Customs; 1934–1935 | Succeeded by Adolf Indrebø |
| Preceded by Paul Hartmann | Norwegian Minister of Finance and Customs; June 1945–November 1945 | Succeeded by Erik Brofoss |
Government offices
| Preceded by Nicolai Rygg | Central Bank Governor of Norway; 1946–1954 | Succeeded by Erik Brofoss |
