= Lars Evensen =

Norwegian trade unionist and politician (1896–1969)

Lars Samuel Myhrer Evensen
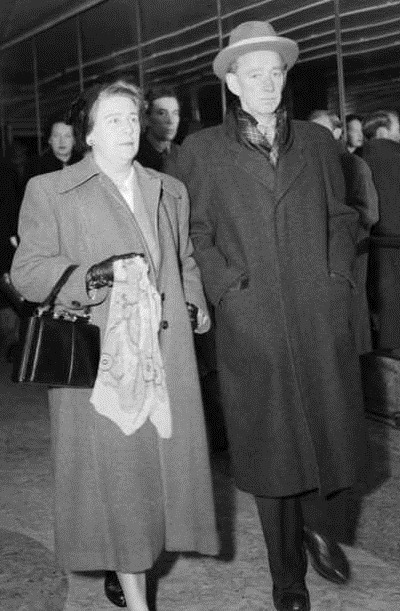

Governor of Vest-Agder
- In office 1954–1966
- Preceded by: Alf Frydenberg
- Succeeded by: Bue Fjermeros

Personal details
- Born: 12 November 1896 Drøbak, Norway
- Died: 19 January 1969 (aged 72) Kristiansand, Norway
- Citizenship: Norway
- Profession: Politician

Lars Samuel Myhrer Evensen (12 November 1896 – 19 January 1969) was a Norwegian trade unionist and politician. He belonged to the Communist Party in the 1920s, but later joined the Labour Party. He was also deputy chairman of the Norwegian Confederation of Trade Unions. After the Second World War he served for many years as Minister of Industry.

== Biography ==
Evensen was born in Drøbak as the son of smithmaster Samuel Anton Evensen (1858-1943) and his wife Laura Myhrer (1864-1931). He worked as a sausage maker from 1914 to 1924, and became involved in his corresponding trade union from 1920.

He also entered local politics, as a member of Lørenskog municipal council from 1922 to 1928. He became a high-ranked member of the Communist Party, which was formed in 1923 by a split from the Labour Party. He served as party secretary from 1925 to 1927, and from 1925 to 1928 he was a member of its central committee. He chaired the regional chapter in Oslo and Akershus from 1926 to 1927.

From 1925, he was also a member of the council (representantskap) of the Confederation of Trade Unions. From 1927 to 1934 he chaired his trade union, the Norwegian Union of Meat Industry Workers. He was among the founders of the sports club Kjøttindustriens IL in 1930 and the temperance group Kjøttindustriens avholdslag in 1932.

Evensen eventually joined the Labour Party, and was a board member of the local party chapter in Oslo in 1932. At the same time he rose in the hierarchy of the Confederation of Trade Unions to become secretary from 1934 to 1939, and deputy chairman from 1939 to 1945—from 1940 in exile. From 1940 to 1945, during the German occupation of Norway, Evensen was a member of the Norwegian resistance movement (Hjemmefronten) and worked at the Norwegian legation in Stockholm. He also chaired the Stockholm-based secretariat of the Confederation of Trade Unions from 1941 to 1945.

After the liberation of Norway, he was selected as Minister of Trade in 1945 during the first cabinet Gerhardsen. He continued in the position after the free general election of 1945, serving as a member of the second cabinet Gerhardsen and the cabinet Torp from 1945 to May 1953 and September 1953 to November 1953. The position was renamed Minister of Industry in 1947. For some months in 1951 Arne Drogseth was acting Minister of Industry, and Erik Brofoss filled the position from May to September 1953.

In 1954, he was elected to the Norwegian Parliament from Oslo, and sat through one term. During this term, he chaired the Standing Committee on Forestry, Water Resources and Industry.

His career in politics ended with the post of County Governor of Vest-Agder, which he held from 1954 to 1966. He succeeded Alf Frydenberg, who had been appointed County Governor of Hedmark. From 1957 to 1966, he was also a member of the board of Store Norske Spitsbergen Kulkompani.

In 1968, he was awarded the Commander's Cross of the Order of Saint Olav. Evensen died at Kristiansand and was buried at Vestre Gravlund in Oslo.

Political offices
Preceded by Sven Nielsen	Minister of Industry; 1945–May 1953 (Arne Gudbrand Drogseth was acting minister in 1951)	Succeeded by Erik Brofoss
Preceded by Erik Brofoss	Minister of Industry; September 1953–November 1953	Succeeded by Nils Handal
Government offices
Preceded by Alf Frydenberg	County Governor of Vest-Agder; 1954–1966	Succeeded by Bue Fjermeros
