= Knut Getz Wold =

Norwegian economist and civil servant

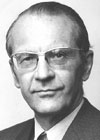
Knut Getz Wold

Knut Getz Wold (3 August 1915 – 9 October 1987) was a Norwegian economist and civil servant, who served as the governor of the Central Bank of Norway from 1970 to 1985.

He was born in Verdal Municipality in Nordre Trondheim county, as a son of district physician Trygve Wold (1879–1939) and Anna Ella Getz (1893–1960). He graduated from the University of Oslo with cand.oecon. degree in 1939. As a young man he became a member of the Norwegian Association for Women's Rights. He lost his brother Torolf during the Norwegian Campaign on 4 May 1940.

He started working with research at the university, and studied further at Stockholm College in 1940. In 1941 he started working for the Ministry of Finance-in-exile in the United Kingdom. From July 1947 to March 1948 he served as a State Secretary in the Ministry of Social Affairs. Wold represented the Liberal Party, and Gerhardsen's Second Cabinet in which he was appointed was a Labour cabinet.

In 1948 he returned to the civil servant role when he became deputy under-secretary of state in the Ministry of Trade. In his diaries he described the Ministry of Trade as "not [...] a ministry, but a Brain Trust of young economists". He remained there until 1958, when former Minister of Trade Erik Brofoss, who now had become governor of the Central Bank of Norway, appointed Wold as deputy governor. Wold was the unquestionable successor as governor when Brofoss withdrew in 1970. In 1985, the year of his seventieth birthday, Wold stepped down and was succeeded by Hermod Skånland.

Wold was also a consultant for the Norwegian Nobel Committee from 1946 to 1958, financial commentator in Norwegian Broadcasting Corporation radio from 1948 to 1970, chairman of Statsøkonomisk Forening from 1963 to 1968, board chairman of Dagbladet from 1970 to 1974 and board member of Alcan Aluminium from 1967 to 1971. He was appointed a Commander of the Royal Norwegian Order of St. Olav in 1975, a Commander of the Danish Order of the Dannebrog and a Grand Knight of the Icelandic Order of the Falcon. He died in October 1987 in Oslo.

Government offices
Preceded by Erik Brofoss	Central Bank Governor of Norway; 1970–1985	Succeeded by Hermod Skånland
