= Skjåk =

Skjåk (historically: Skjaak) may refer to:

== People ==
- Ola Skjåk Bræk, a Norwegian politician
- Lise Skjåk Bræk, a Norwegian textile artist

== Places ==
- Skjåk Municipality, a municipality in Innlandet county, Norway
- Skjåk (village), a village within Skjåk Municipality in Innlandet county, Norway
- Skjåk Church, a church in Skjåk Municipality in Innlandet county, Norway
