= Torp cabinet =

Cabinet of Norway from 1951 to 1955

Torp's Cabinet
- Cabinet of Norway

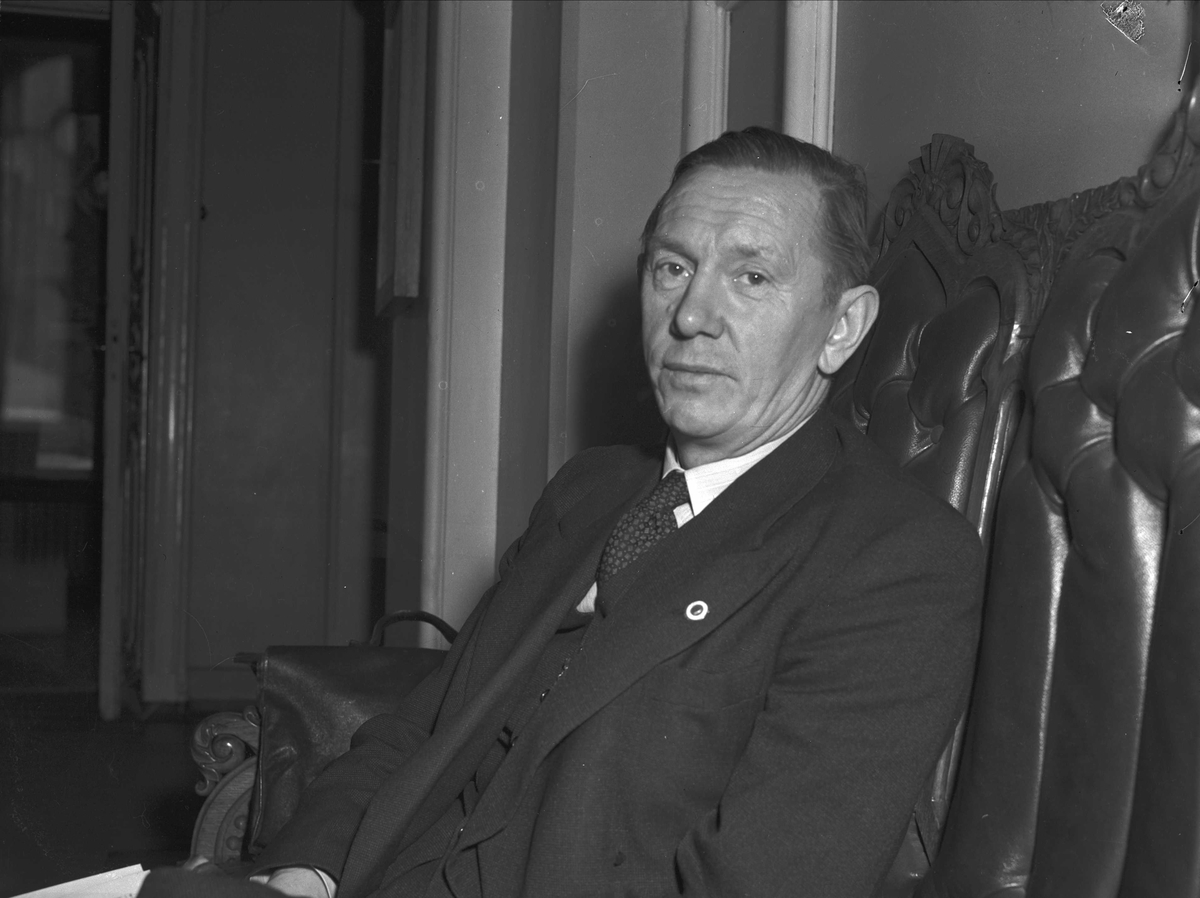
- Date formed: 19 November 1951
- Date dissolved: 22 January 1955

People and organisations
- King: Haakon VII of Norway
- Prime Minister: Oscar Torp
- No. of ministers: 15
- Member party: Labour Party
- Status in legislature: Majority government

History
- Election: 1953 parliamentary election
- Legislature terms: 1949-1953; 1953-1957
- Predecessor: Gerhardsen's Second Cabinet
- Successor: Gerhardsen's Third Cabinet

Torp's Cabinet governed Norway between 19 November 1951 and 22 January 1955. The Labour Party cabinet was led by Oscar Torp. The cabinet was succeeded by Einar Gerhardsen's third cabinet after the Labour Party wanted to swap prime minister.

== Cabinet members ==
Cabinet
Portfolio	Minister	Took office	Left office	Party
Prime Minister	Oscar Torp	19 November 1951	22 January 1955	Labour
Minister of Foreign Affairs	Halvard Lange	19 November 1951	22 January 1955	Labour
Minister of Finance and Customs	Trygve Bratteli	19 November 1951	22 January 1955	Labour
Minister of Defence	Jens Christian Hauge	19 November 1951	5 January 1952	Labour
Minister of Defence	Nils Langhelle	5 January 1952	14 June 1954	Labour
Minister of Defence	Kai Birger Knudsen	15 June 1954	22 January 1955	Labour
Minister of Justice and the Police	O. C. Gundersen	19 November 1951	20 December 1952	Labour
Minister of Justice and the Police	Kai Birger Knudsen	20 December 1952	14 June 1954	Labour
Minister of Justice and the Police	Gustav Sjaastad	15 June 1954	22 January 1955	Labour
Minister of Transport and Communications	Nils Langhelle	19 November 1951	5 January 1952	Labour
Minister of Transport and Communications	Jakob Martin Pettersen	5 January 1952	22 January 1955	Labour
Minister of Local Government and Labour	Ulrik Olsen	19 November 1951	22 January 1955	Labour
Minister of Education and Church Affairs	Lars Moen	19 November 1951	8 December 1953	Labour
Minister of Education and Church Affairs	Birger Bergersen	9 December 1953	22 January 1955	Labour
Minister of Social Affairs	Aaslaug Aasland	19 November 1951	1 November 1953	Labour
Minister of Social Affairs	Rakel Seweriin	2 November 1953	22 January 1955	Labour
Minister of Agriculture	Rasmus Nordbø	19 November 1951	22 January 1955	Labour
Minister of Industry	Lars Evensen (Note: Erik Brofoss was acting minister from 18 May to 13 September 1953.)	19 November 1951	1 November 1953	Labour
Minister of Industry	Nils Handal	2 November 1953	22 January 1955	Labour
Minister of Trade and Shipping	Erik Brofoss (Note: Oscar Torp was acting minister from 2 to 15 June 1954.)	19 November 1951	2 June 1954	Labour
Minister of Trade and Shipping	Nils Langhelle	15 June 1954	22 January 1955	Labour
Minister of Fisheries	Peder Holt	19 November 1951	22 January 1955	Labour
