= Asbjørn Stensaker =

Norwegian politician (1885–1959)

Asbjørn Stensaker (26 April 1885 – 11 December 1959) was a Norwegian educator and politician for the Conservative Party. He is best known as Mayor of Bergen.

He was born in Vaage Municipality as the son of teacher Thor Stensaker (1858–1943) and Anne Baarstad (1863–1888). He grew up in Fana Municipality, where his father was a teacher. He finished his secondary education in 1903, and spent one year at the Norwegian Military Academy before enrolling at the Royal Frederick University. He graduated with the cand.philol. degree in 1909, with the master's thesis Norges forsvar under Hannibal Sehesteds statholderskap. He continued in the military, and reached the rank of premier lieutenant in 1910. He spent his professional career as a teacher at three schools in Bergen: at Hambros skole from 1910 to 1912, Bergen Cathedral School from 1912 to 1932 and Sydneshaugen høyere almenskole as headmaster from 1932 to 1955. He was also a theatre and literature critic in Bergens Aftenblad from 1917 to 1932. In June 1914 he married Sigrid Ibsen Rogge (1890–1968).

Stensaker was elected to Bergen's city council in 1919. He remained there for several years, and became deputy mayor in 1933. In 1935 he became mayor. He continued as mayor during World War II and the occupation of Norway by Nazi Germany, and on 2 January 1941 he was officially endorsed by Nasjonal Samling. Stensaker tried to remain in his post in order to limit Nazi influence and Nazification of the city, but found himself in a difficult situation. He tried to step down in November 1941, but this move was stopped by the Nazi authorities; however Stensaker was removed on 28 March 1942 after rejecting Lærersambandet among other things. Nasjonal Samling member Alf Johannesen took over. In August 1943 Stensaker was imprisoned for fourteen days at Hvalsmoen, but was released due to old age. Stensaker returned as mayor for half a year in 1945 after the war's end. In 1946 he released the book Det hendte i Bergen 9. april 1940–28. mars 1942, explaining his role. Stensaker was also a deputy representative to the Parliament of Norway from Bergen during the terms 1934–1936 and 1937–1945 (from 1940 it was out of function).

As mayor of Bergen, Stensaker became chairman of the Union of Norwegian Cities, and remained so until 1946. He was the deputy chairman of Kommunale Kinomatografers Landsforbund from 1936 to 1945, having been a board member of Bergen's cinematographer from 1924 and chairman from 1934 to 1945. He also chaired the school board in Bergen from 1932 to 1933, Den Nationale Scene from 1940 to 1949, Bergens historiske forening from 1948 to 1953 and Bergen Handelsgymnasium from 1951 to 1955. He was a board member of Bergen Museum from 1936 to 1948.

Stensaker was decorated as a Grand Knight of the Order of the Falcon and as a Commander of the Order of the White Rose and the Order of Leopold II. He died in December 1959 in Bergen.

Political offices
Preceded by Leif M. Michelsen	Mayor of Bergen; 1935–1942	Succeeded by Alf Johannesen
Preceded by Alf Johannesen	Mayor of Bergen; 1945–1945	Succeeded by Nils Handal
