= Paul Hartmann =

Paul Hartmann may refer to:

- Paul Ernst Wilhelm Hartmann, Norwegian politician
- Paul Hartmann (actor) (1889–1977), German actor
