= Gunnar Rogstad =

Norwegian diplomat (1916–2012)

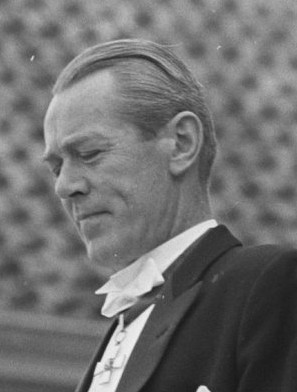
Gunnar Rogstad in 1967

Gunnar Rogstad (9 March 1916 – 10 June 2012) was a Norwegian civil servant and diplomat.

He was born in Fana as a son of Abraham Rogstad and Ragna née Habel. After finishing a mercantile school in 1934, he was a businessperson until 1942. Gunnar's brother Ole became a banker.

In 1942, while Norway was occupied by Germany, Rogstad entered the Norwegian foreign service as a clerk at the consulate-general in Allied-occupied Iceland. He also married an Icelandic woman. After the war, Rogstad became a secretary in the Ministry of Foreign Affairs. Following an intermittent stay as vice consul in Cape Town from 1948 to 1952, Rogstad was promoted to head of department in the Ministry of Foreign Affairs in 1953. After a stint as councillor of trade at the Norwegian embassy in Bonn from 1956, he was promoted once more to subdirector in 1960, then deputy under-secretary of state in 1965.

Rogstad served as Norway's ambassador to the Netherlands from 1967, was the chief executive of Norges Eksportråd from 1971 to 1979, before finishing his career as Norway's ambassador to Sweden from 1981 to 1984. He was decorated as a Commander of the Order of St. Olav. He died in June 2012, aged 96.

Civic offices
Preceded by Otto Christian Malterud	Director of the Norwegian Export Council; 1971–1979	Succeeded by Einar Magnussen
