= Einar Magnussen =

Norwegian politician (1931–2004)

Einar Magnussen (5 June 1931 – 27 March 2004) was a Norwegian economist and politician for the Labour Party. He was born in Ålesund.

In 1973, in the second cabinet Bratteli, Aune was appointed state secretary in the Ministry of Trade and Shipping. Between 1974 and 1976 he was acting Minister of Trade and Shipping.

Outside politics he graduated as cand.oecon. in 1957 and worked the rest of that year as a secretary in Statistics Norway. He then worked in Norges Bank, the Norwegian Ministry of Finance, the International Monetary Fund, the Bank of Tanzania and the World Bank. From 1979 to 1982 he was director of Norges Eksportråd; from 1983 to 1991 and 1992 to 1996 he was director of Norges Bank.

Political offices
Preceded by Jens Evensen	Norwegian Minister of Trade and Shipping (acting); 1974–1976	Succeeded by Hallvard Bakke
