= Ole Bae =

Norwegian civil servant

County Governor of Nord-Trøndelag
- In office 1964-1972
- Preceded by: Gustav Sjaastad
- Succeeded by: Leif Granli

Personal details
- Awards: Order of St. Olav; Commander of the Order of the Polar Star

Ole Bae (18 August 1902 – 28 September 1972) was a Norwegian civil servant.

He was born in Bremnes Municipality as a son of teacher Jakob Bae (1866–1963) and Anna Fladvad (1871–1954). He graduated from commerce school in 1921, and worked his entire career in county administration. He started in Finnmark from 1922 to 1924, then after spending the year 1925 in Spain he was hired as a civil servant at the Nord-Trøndelag County Governor's office in 1926.

During the latter part of World War II, Bae was, by order of the Home Front leadership, "illegal county governor of Nord-Trøndelag" after Håkon Five's death in 1944. Bae also collaborated with the acting county governor Bent Berger from May to December 1945.

He was County Governor of Nord-Trøndelag from 1964 to 1972. Unlike many County Governors, he had no background in national politics, but had been a member of the municipal council of Steinkjer Municipality.

He was a Commander of the Order of the Polar Star and the Royal Norwegian Order of St. Olav (1971).
