= Minister of Trade and Shipping =

Politicians of Norway

Minister of Trade and Shipping of Norway
- Handels- og sjøfartsministeren
- Ministry of Trade and Shipping
- Member of: Council of State
- Seat: Oslo
- Nominator: Prime Minister
- Appointer: Monarch with approval of Parliament
- Term length: No fixed length
- Constituting instrument: Constitution of Norway
- Precursor: Minister of Trade and Industry
- Formation: 6 December 1947
- First holder: Erik Brofoss
- Deputy: State secretaries at the Ministry of Trade and Shipping

The minister of trade and shipping (Norwegian: Handels- og sjøfartsministeren) was a councilor of state and chief of the Norway's Ministry of Trade and Shipping. The position was created on 6 December 1947 when the position of minister of trade and industry was split into a portfolio for trade and shipping, and a minister of industry. As a prelude, a separate minister of shipping had been created between 1942 and 1945 to lead the Ministry of Shipping. The minister of trade and industry had its own ministry until 1988, when the responsibility was taken over by the Ministry of Foreign Affairs. The position was abolished in 1997, when the portfolio was taken over by the minister of trade and industry.

== Key ==
The following lists the minister, their party, date of assuming and leaving office, their tenure in years and days, and the cabinet they served in.

Christian Democratic Party
Conservative Party
Labour Party
Liberal Party

== Ministers ==
Photo	Name	Party	Took office	Left office	Tenure	Cabinet	Ref
	Arne Sunde	Liberal	21 October 1942	25 June 1945	2 years, 247 days	Nygaardsvold	
	Erik Brofoss	Labour	6 December 1947	2 June 1954	6 years, 178 days	Gerhardsen II; Torp	
	Oscar Torp	Labour	2 June 1954	15 June 1954	13 days	Torp	
	Nils Langhelle	Labour	15 June 1954	22 January 1955	221 days	Torp	
	Arne Skaug	Labour	22 January 1955	13 January 1962	6 years, 356 days	Gerhardsen III	
	O. C. Gundersen	Labour	13 January 1962	28 August 1963	1 year, 227 days	Gerhardsen III	
	Kåre Willoch	Conservative	28 August 1963	25 September 1963	28 days	Lyng	
	Erik Himle	Labour	25 September 1963	20 January 1964	117 days	Gerhardsen IV	
	Trygve Lie	Labour	20 January 1964	12 October 1965	1 year, 265 days	Gerhardsen IV	
	Kåre Willoch	Conservative	12 October 1965	5 June 1970	4 years, 236 days	Borten	
	Otto Grieg Tidemand	Conservative	5 June 1970	17 March 1971	285 days	Borten	
	Per Kleppe	Labour	17 March 1971	18 October 1972	1 year, 215 days	Bratteli I	
—	Hallvard Eika	Liberal	18 October 1972	16 October 1973	363 days	Korvald	
	Jens Evensen	Labour	16 October 1973	27 September 1974	346 days	Bratteli II	
—	Einar Magnussen	Labour	27 September 1974	15 January 1976	1 year, 110 days	Bratteli II	
—	Hallvard Bakke	Labour	15 January 1976	8 October 1979	3 years, 266 days	Nordli	
	Reiulf Steen	Labour	8 October 1979	4 February 1981	1 year, 119 days	Nordli	
—	Kari Gjesteby	Labour	4 February 1981	14 October 1981	252 days	Brundtland I	
—	Arne Skauge	Conservative	14 October 1981	8 June 1983	1 year, 237 days	Willoch I	
—	Asbjørn Haugstvedt	Christian Democratic	8 June 1983	9 May 1986	2 years, 335 days	Willoch II	
—	Kurt Mosbakk	Labour	9 May 1986	13 June 1988	2 years, 35 days	Brundtland II	
	Jan Balstad	Labour	13 June 1988	16 October 1989	1 year, 125 days	Brundtland II	
	Kaci Kullmann Five	Conservative	16 October 1989	3 November 1990	1 year, 18 days	Syse	
—	Eldrid Nordbø	Labour	3 November 1990	15 November 1991	1 year, 12 days	Brundtland III	
	Bjorn Tore Godal	Labour	15 November 1991	24 January 1994	2 years, 70 days	Brundtland III	
—	Grete Knudsen	Labour	24 January 1994	25 October 1996	2 years, 275 days	Brundtland III	
