= Arne Skaug =

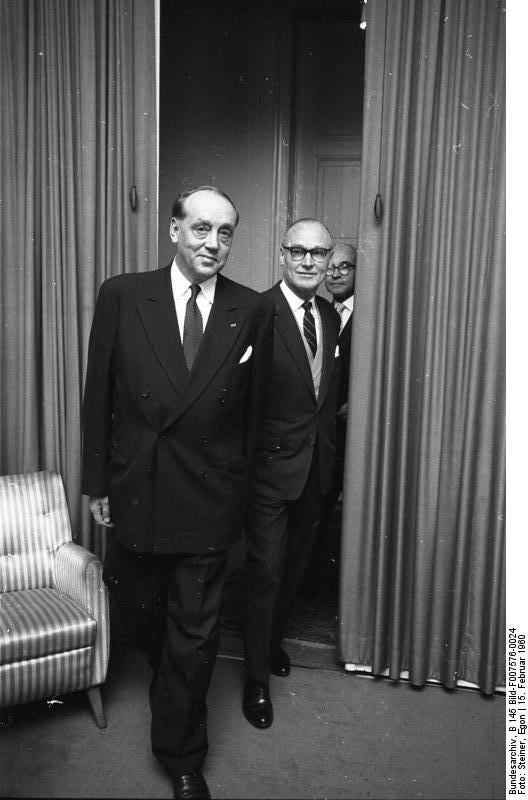
- Skaug visiting Germany in 1960.

Norwegian Ambassador to the United Kingdom
- In office 13 January 1962 – 16 February 1968
- Prime Minister: Einar Gerhardsen; Per Borten
- Preceded by: Erik Braadland
- Succeeded by: Paul Koht

Minister of Trade and Shipping
- In office 22 January 1955 – 13 January 1962
- Prime Minister: Einar Gerhardsen
- Preceded by: Nils Langhelle
- Succeeded by: O. C. Gundersen

Personal details
- Born: 6 November 1906 Horten, Norway
- Died: 4 March 1974 (aged 67) Copenhagen, Denmark
- Party: Labour

Arne Skaug (6 November 1906 – 4 March 1974) was a Norwegian economist, civil servant, diplomat and politician for the Labour Party. He is known as director of Statistics Norway from 1946 to 1948, Norwegian Minister of Trade and Shipping from 1955 to 1962 and later ambassador.

== Early life and career ==
He was born in Horten as a son of Johan Anton Skaug (1881–1956) and Jenny Lovise Olsen (1882–1917). He graduated with the cand.oecon. degree in 1930, and was hired as a secretary in Statistics Norway in the same year. He continued to work there, except for study leaves from 1935 to 1936 in London. In 1935 and 1936 he released two books: Tidens sosialøkonomi and Dør vi ut? Befolkningsspørsmålet og arbeiderbevegelsen, both written together with Aase Lionæs. In 1939 he was hired in the Ministry of Provisioning, and was a research fellow in economics. He then spent the war years in the United States; first with studies from 1939 to 1941 and as assisting professor at the University of Wisconsin, Madison from 1941. From 1942 to 1946 he worked for Norwegian government in New York City and Washington DC.

== Post-war career ==
In 1946 he returned to Norway to become the director of Statistics Norway. In May 1948 he left to become State Secretary in the Ministry of Foreign Affairs, becoming the first in the Ministry of Foreign Affairs to hold the State Secretary position, which had been introduced in 1947. He left this position in February 1949 to become the Norwegian ambassador to the Organisation for Economic Co-operation and Development in Paris. From January 1955 to January 1962 he served as the Minister of Trade and Shipping in Gerhardsen's Third Cabinet. He was also the acting Minister of Foreign Affairs from August to October 1957 and December 1960 to February 1961, when Halvard Lange had absences of leave. He was then the ambassador to the United Kingdom and Ireland from 1962 to 1968, and to Denmark from 1968 to 1974. He died in March 1974.

Skaug was heavily decorated. He was a Commander of the Greek Order of the Phoenix, and held the Grand Cross of the British Royal Victorian Order, the Swedish Order of the Polar Star, the Portuguese Order of Christ, the Siamese Order of the White Elephant, the Persian Order of the Lion and the Sun, the Danish Order of the Dannebrog, the Belgian Order of the Crown, the Icelandic Order of the Falcon , the Finnish Order of the Lion and the Royal Norwegian Order of St. Olav.

Political offices
Preceded by Nils Langhelle	Norwegian Minister of Trade and Shipping; 1955–1962	Succeeded by Oscar Christian Gundersen
Diplomatic posts
Preceded by Erik Braadland	Norwegian Ambassador to the United Kingdom; 1962–1968	Succeeded by Paul Koht
