= Eivind Øygarden =

Norwegian politician (1918–1979)

Eivind Øygarden (24 March 1918 – 18 October 1979) was a Norwegian politician for the Centre Party.

He served as a deputy representative to the Parliament of Norway from Telemark during the terms 1969–1973 and 1973–1977. In total he met during 84 days of parliamentary session. In October 1973, he even met as a regular representative, filling in for Hallvard Eika who was an outgoing member of Korvald's Cabinet. He worked as a schoolmaster in Vinje Municipality.
