= Norwegian Union of Meat Industry Workers =

Norwegian trade union

The Norwegian Union of Meat Industry Workers (Norwegian: Norsk Kjøttindustriarbeiderforbund, NKIF) was a trade union representing workers in abattoirs and butchers in Norway.

The union was founded in 1907, and it affiliated to the Norwegian Confederation of Trade Unions. By 1924, it had 524 members. In 1927, Lars Evensen became leader of the union, and its membership grew sharply.

By 1963, the union had 4,024 members. In 1970, it merged into the Norwegian Union of Food, Beverage and Allied Workers.

== Presidents ==
1927: Lars Evensen
1934: Henrik Henriksen
1945: Helmer Karlsson
c.1960: Henning Dahl
