= Nicolai Rygg =

Norwegian economist, Governor of the Central Bank of Norway (1872–1957)

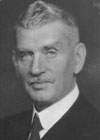
- Born: Nicolai Theodorius Nilssen Rygg; 29 February 1872; Stavanger, Norway
- Died: 27 September 1957 (aged 85)
- Known for: Governor of the Central Bank of Norway

Nicolai Theodorius Nilssen Rygg (29 February 1872 – 27 September 1957) was a Norwegian economist and Governor of the Central Bank of Norway.

== Biography ==
He was born in Stavanger as a son of shoemaker Ole Nilssen Rygg (1842–1908) and Ane Severine Larsdatter (1841–1913). He was a brother of journalist Andreas Nilsen Rygg. In 1910 he married physician's daughter Agnes Isidore Margrethe Sibbern Møller (1872–1963).

He finished his secondary education in 1889, and graduated from the Royal Frederick University with the cand.jur. degree in 1894. He was a deputy judge in Vesterålen District Court before studying economics in Göttingen and Genève in 1896 to 1897, later statistics in the United States from 1904 to 1905. He worked in Statistics Norway from 1898, and from 1907 he doubled as secretary in Statistics Norway and research fellow at the Royal Frederick University. His special field was social statistics, and he also chaired Norsk Forening for Socialt Arbeide from 1909 to 1915. From 1910 to 1913 he was a professor at the Royal Frederick University in economics and statistics. Important publications include Den norske Creditbank. 1857–1907 (with Ebbe Hertzberg, 1907) and Norges Banks historie. Del 1. 1816–1850 (1918), histories on Den norske Creditbank and the Central Bank of Norway.

From 1913 to 1920 he served as the director of Statistics Norway. In November 1920 he took over as Governor of the Central Bank of Norway. Norway experienced a serious financial and banking crisis during the 1920s. Rygg spearheaded the "par policy", in which the goal was to lead the kr value back to pre-World War I level. In 1928 the Norwegian krone was finally connected to the gold standard, but this only lasted until 1931. In 1931–1932, the Central Bank also averted a serious banking crisis. Rygg was regarded as an active financial politician, and as being a more independent bank governor than his successors. He is also known for pressuring opposition leader Johan Ludwig Mowinckel to file a vote of no confidence against the socialist Hornsrud's Cabinet in February 1928.

After retiring as Central Bank Governor at the age of 74, he returned to his academic writing. He released Norges Bank i mellomkrigstiden in 1950 and Norges Banks historie. Del II. 1850–1920 in 1954. He was a fellow of the Norwegian Academy of Science and Letters.

He was decorated as a Knight Grand Cross of the Order of the Polar Star and the Order of the White Rose of Finland, and Commander of the Order of St. Olav (1925), the Order of the Dannebrog, the Order of Vasa, the Order of the Falcon and the Order of the Nile.

Government offices
Preceded by Anders Nicolai Kiær	Director of Statistics Norway; 1913–1920	Succeeded by Gunnar Jahn
Preceded by Karl Gether Bomhoff	Central Bank Governor of Norway; 1920–1946	Succeeded by Gunnar Jahn
