= Ivar Lunde =

Norwegian diplomat (1908–1992)

Ivar Lunde (18 June 1908 – 18 July 1992) was a Norwegian diplomat.

He was born in Pavlovsk, and took the examen artium in 1927 and the cand.jur. degree in 1932. He started working for the Ministry of Foreign Affairs in 1933, and was stationed in Paris, Moscow, Teheran, Ankara and Lisbon. From 1946 to 1949 he was an assistant secretary in the Ministry of Foreign Affairs, before spending three years as a counsellor at the Norwegian United Nations embassy, legation counsellor and chargé d'affaires in Athens and Tel Aviv. He was stationed in Athens; a separate station in Tel Aviv was not opened until 1958.

He was then the Norwegian envoy to Thailand from 1952, then ambassador to Turkey from 1956. As such he also acted as the ambassador to Iraq, Iran and West Pakistan. He was the ambassador to Finland from 1962 to the Soviet Union (and Mongolia) from 1966 and to Austria from 1970 to 1977. Here he was also the Norwegian permanent delegate to IAEA, UNIDO and MBFR.

After 1977, he was a special adviser for the Ministry of Foreign Affairs. At the same time he worked as a lawyer for refugees in Norway, and took up translation. He was an authorized translator from the Polish language since 1978, and translated Czesław Miłosz among others. He died in 1992.

Diplomatic posts
Preceded by Frithjof Jacobsen	Norwegian ambassador to the Soviet Union; 1966–1970	Succeeded by Frithjof Jacobsen
