= Frithjof Jacobsen =

Norwegian diplomat (1914–1999)

Frithjof Halfdan Jacobsen (14 January 1914 – 14 March 1999) was a Norwegian diplomat.

He was born in South Shields to the shipmaster and navy captain Carl Gustav Jacobsen (1878–1941) and Frida Mørch (1878–1968). He returned to Norway, where he finished his secondary education in 1932 before studying law at the University of Oslo. He graduated with the cand.jur. degree in 1937 and studied at the London School of Economics before being hired in the Norwegian Ministry of Foreign Affairs in 1938. He served as an attaché at the Norwegian legation in Paris, and had to flee the country in June 1940. In October he reached London, where he worked for the Ministry of Foreign Affairs-in-exile during Norway's occupation by Germany. In October 1941 in London he married captain's daughter Elsa Tidemand Andersen.

After the war he worked in Norway and as embassy secretary in Moscow and London, before being hired as an assistant secretary in the Ministry of Foreign Affairs in 1950. He was then an embassy councillor in London from 1953 to 1955, deputy under-secretary of state in Norway from 1955 to 1959, Norway's ambassador to Canada from 1959 to 1961, and to the Soviet Union from 1961 to 1965. He then joined Borten's Cabinet as a non-partisan member, and was a State Secretary in the Ministry of Foreign Affairs from 1965 to 1970. He returned as ambassador to the Soviet Union from 1970 to 1974, then served as ambassador to the United Kingdom from 1975 to 1982.

He was decorated as a Commander of the Order of St. Olav in 1964. He died in March 1999 in Oslo.

Diplomatic posts
Preceded by Oscar Christian Gundersen	Norwegian Ambassador to the Soviet Union; 1961–1965	Succeeded by Ivar Lunde
Preceded by Ivar Lunde	Norwegian Ambassador to the Soviet Union; 1970–1974	Succeeded by Petter Graver
Preceded by Paul Koht	Norwegian Ambassador to the United Kingdom; 1975–1982	Succeeded by Rolf Trygve Busch
