= Norwegian Export Council =

Former Norwegian consultant organ

The Norwegian Export Council (Norwegian: Norges Eksportråd) was a Norwegian state-owned consultant organ established in 1945. Its role was to provide consultancy and advice for the Ministry of Foreign Affairs in export-related matters. Until 1994 the council was financed by a levy on exports, but from 1996 it was a foundation co-financed by the Ministry of Foreign Affairs and the Confederation of Norwegian Enterprise. It was superseded by Innovation Norway on 1 January 2004.

== Directors ==
- 1946–1948 Bjarne Børde
- 1948–1951 Thor Brodtkorb
- 1951–1952 Bjarne Børde
- 1953–1955 Nils Anton Jørgensen
- 1955–1971 Otto Christian Malterud
- 1971–1979 Gunnar Rogstad
- 1979–1982 Einar Magnussen
- 1983–1988 Arne Langeland
- 1988–1995 Kjell-Martin Fredriksen
- 1995–2001 Per Andreas Vogt
- 2002–2003 Arild H. Blixrud
