= Oscar Christian Gundersen =

Norwegian politician (1908–1991)

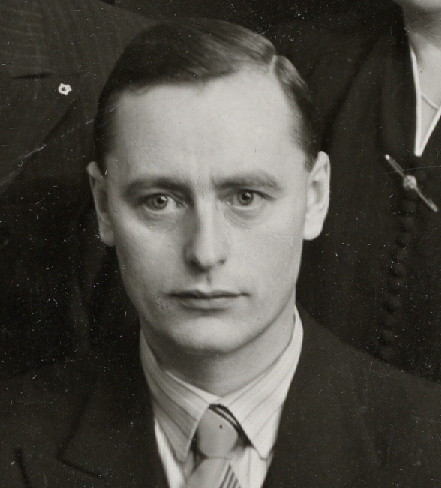
- Gundersen in ca. 1940

Minister of Justice
- In office 25 September 1963 – 12 October 1965
- Prime Minister: Einar Gerhardsen
- Preceded by: Petter Mørch Koren
- Succeeded by: Elisabeth S. Selmer
- In office 5 November 1945 – 20 December 1952
- Prime Minister: Einar Gerhardsen; Oscar Torp
- Preceded by: Johan Cappelen
- Succeeded by: Kai Birger Knudsen

Minister of Trade and Shipping
- In office 13 January 1962 – 28 August 1963
- Prime Minister: Einar Gerhardsen
- Preceded by: Arne Skaug
- Succeeded by: Kåre Willoch

Norwegian Ambassador to the Soviet Union
- In office 30 August 1958 – 2 September 1961
- Prime Minister: Einar Gerhardsen
- Preceded by: Erik Braadland
- Succeeded by: Frithjof Jacobsen

Personal details
- Born: 17 March 1908 Kristiania, Norway
- Died: 21 February 1991 (aged 82) Oslo, Norway
- Party: Labour
- Spouse: Ragna Lorentzen (m. 1937)
- Occupation: Politician, lawyer, judge and diplomat

Oscar Christian Gundersen (17 March 1908 – 21 February 1991) was a Norwegian politician for the Labour Party.

During his student days he was a member of Mot Dag. Gundersen graduated with the cand.jur. degree in 1931. During Gerhardsen's Second Cabinet he was appointed Minister of Justice and the Police, a post he held a year into the new Torp's Cabinet. He left in 1952 and became a Supreme Court Justice the next year. In 1958 he left that position to become Norwegian ambassador to the Soviet Union, a post he held until 1961.

He was then appointed Minister of Trade and Shipping from 1962 to 1963 during the third cabinet Gerhardsen. In August 1963 the cabinet Lyng assumed office, but a fourth cabinet Gerhardsen returned to power a month later. Gundersen was now Minister of Justice and the Police again, a post he held until the fourth cabinet Gerhardsen fell in 1965. He worked as a Supreme Court Justice for the second time, from 1967 to 1977.

From 1970 to 1973 he chaired the committee that delivered the Norwegian Official Report 18/1974, about State Secretaries. The work led to a new §14 and an altered §62 in the Constitution of Norway, leading to State Secretaries being eligible for general election and establishing the role as political. Propositions about granting access for State Secretaries to parliamentary debates without the ability to vote, to which Gundersen agreed, failed.

== Honours ==
- Knight Grand Cross of the Order of St Michael and St George, 1962

Political offices
Preceded by Johan Cappelen	Norwegian Minister of Justice and the Police; 1945–1952	Succeeded by Kai Knudsen
Preceded by Arne Skaug	Norwegian Minister of Trade and Shipping; 1962–1963	Succeeded by Kåre Willoch
Preceded by Petter Mørch Koren	Norwegian Minister of Justice and the Police; 1963–1965	Succeeded by Elisabeth Schweigaard Selmer
Diplomatic posts
Preceded by Erik Braadland	Norwegian ambassador to the Soviet Union; 1958–1961	Succeeded by Frithjof Jacobsen
