= Alf Frydenberg =

Norwegian civil servant

Alf Birger Frydenberg

Governor of Vest-Agder
- In office 1948–1954
- Preceded by: Hagbarth Lund
- Succeeded by: Lars Evensen

Governor of Hedmark
- In office 1954–1966
- Preceded by: Knut Monsen Nordanger
- Succeeded by: Erling Anger

Personal details
- Born: 2 May 1896 Furnes, Norway
- Died: 14 May 1989 (aged 93) Norway
- Citizenship: Norway
- Education: Cand.jur. (1921)
- Alma mater: Royal Frederick University
- Profession: Politician

Alf Birger Frydenberg (2 May 1896 – 14 May 1989) was a Norwegian civil servant.

He was born in Furnes as a son of Bernt Frydenberg (1868–1925) and Benedicte Charlotte Christiansen (1872–1953). In 1931 he married Major's daughter Marie Catharina Knap. He studied from 1917 and graduated from the Royal Frederick University with the cand.jur. degree in 1921. He worked in the Ministry of Social Affairs from 1921 to 1947, except for 1925 to 1926 when he was a deputy judge in Hadeland and Land District Court, and from 1939 to 1940 when he was a deputy under-secretary of state in the Ministry of Provisioning and Reconstruction. In the Ministry of Social Affairs he was a clerk from 1921, assistant secretary from 1936 and deputy under-secretary of state from 1940. As deputy under-secretary of state in the Ministry of Social Affairs. He was responsible for the proposition of deporting German-Norwegian war children to Australia. He was then the County Governor of Vest-Agder from 1948 to 1954 and the County Governor of Hedmark from 1954 to 1966.

He was active in the organizations Østlandsk reising and Østlandsk ungdomsfylking (chair from 1926 to 1927). From 1923 to 1926 he edited their magazine Østaglett. Their goal was to incorporate Eastern Norwegian spoken language into the country's official written language. While living in Vest-Agder, he chaired the Kristiansand branch of Foreningen Norden from 1951 to 1954. While living in Hedmark, he chaired Hedmark Museum and Domkirkeodden from 1955, and Hamar/Elverum Hospital from 1964 to 1968. He was a board member of Opplandskraft from 1954 to 1966. He was a member of several other councils during his career, and was involved in arbitration.

He died in May 1989 and was buried at Vestre gravlund.

Government offices
Preceded by Hagbarth Lund	County Governor of Vest-Agder; 1948–1954	Succeeded by Lars Evensen
Preceded by Knut Monsen Nordanger	County Governor of Hedmark; 1954–1966	Succeeded by Erling Anger
