= Sigurd Kalheim =

Norwegian politician

Sigurd Kalheim (4 April 1927 – 18 July 2007) was a Norwegian politician for the Liberal Party and the Liberal People's Party.

Kalheim, who was born in Hjelmeland Municipality in Rogaland county, Norway. He was never elected directly to the Parliament of Norway but served as a deputy representative for Telemark in the period 1969–1973. During this term he was brought in as a replacement representative for Hallvard Eika, who was appointed to the Cabinet at that time. In December 1972, Jakobsen joined the Liberal People's Party which split from the Liberal Party over disagreements of Norway's proposed entry to the European Economic Community. Kalheim sat through that term, but like most of the Liberal People's Party politicians he failed to be elected in the 1973 general election.

On the local level Kalheim was a member of the executive committee of municipal council for Skien Municipality during the terms 1967–1971, 1971–1975 and 1975–1979.

Outside politics he graduated with the cand.jur. degree in 1951. He was director of Skien Sparebank from 1964 to 1988.
