= Harald Wergeland (rector) =

Norwegian sports official

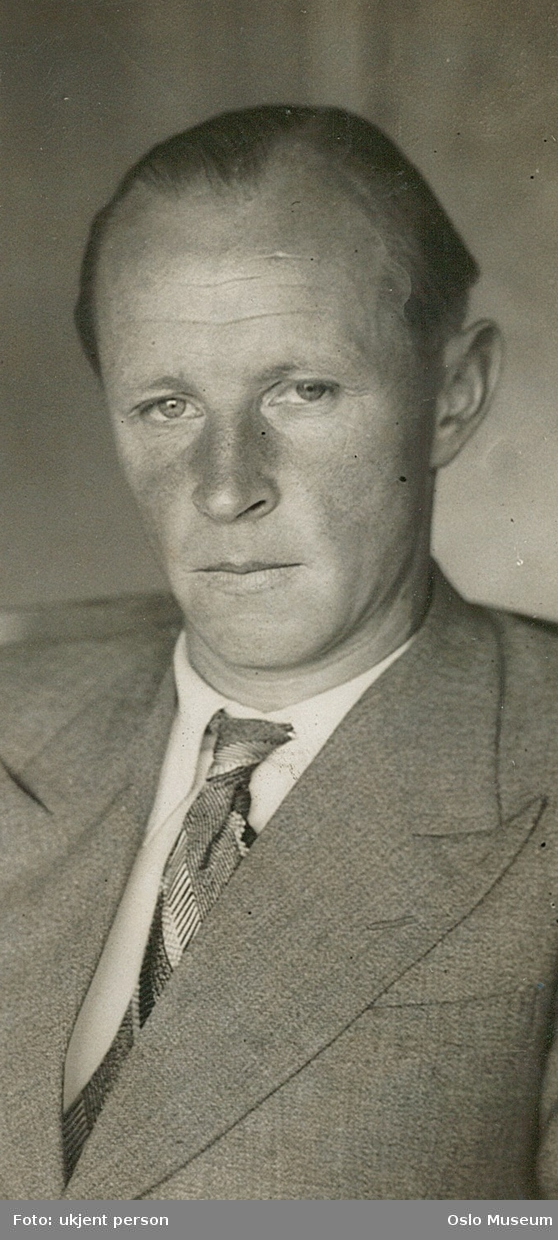
Norwegian gymnastic teacher, athletic and rector Harald Wergeland in 1930s

Harald Wergeland (7 May 1904 – 1989) was a Norwegian sports official.

He was born in Vardal Municipality as a son of rector Håkon Wergeland (1878–1971) and Wilhelmine Kathrine Kielland (1873–1962). In 1952 he married Helga Vogt. A sister of his was married to Kai Knudsen.

He finished his secondary education in 1923. He studied at the State School of Gymnastics, and also in a dozen European countries. He taught science and physical education in Notodden Municipality from 1929 to 1932, and then in Oslo from 1933 to 1934. In 1945 he was hired in Statens gymnastikkontor where he was a consultant and director. From 1947 to 1968 he served as the rector of the State School of Gymnastics. When it changed its name to the Norwegian School of Sport Sciences in 1968, he became a counsellor.

He headed the Norwegian gymnastics team at the 1952 Summer Olympics, and was a referee at the 1960 Summer Olympics. He issued several textbooks on gymnastics, physical education and handball, and edited the magazine Kroppsøving from 1950. He also served as chair of Landsnevnden for skoleidrett and president of the Norwegian Life Saving Society.

He resided in Jong. He died in 1989.
