= Erik Braadland =

Norwegian diplomat and politician

- Born: 21 November 1910; Idd
- Died: 14 July 1988 (aged 77)
- Occupation: Politician
- Spouse: Aase Rydtun

Erik Braadland (21 November 1910 – 14 July 1988) was a Norwegian diplomat and politician for the Centre Party.

He was born in Idd as a son of former Parliament member Birger Braadland (1879–1966) and Ragna Abigael Vogt Stang (1881–1972). He finished Oslo Commerce School in 1928 and then attended the Norwegian Military Academy for one year. He graduated with the cand.oecon. degree in 1932 and was hired in the Ministry of Foreign Affairs in 1934. He was first stationed in Hamburg, then from 1936 in Marseille. From 1940 to 1943 he was a secretary in the Ministry of Provisioning in occupied Oslo. He then fled to neutral Sweden, and served as a secretary in the Norwegian legation in Stockholm from 1943.

In 1945 he was promoted to assistant secretary in the Ministry of Foreign Affairs. He was a legation counsellor in West Berlin from 1947 to 1951, chargé d'affaires in Bonn from 1951 to 1952 and ambassador to SFR Yugoslavia from 1952 to 1954. He then served as the Norwegian ambassador to the Soviet Union from 1954 to 1958 and to both the United Kingdom and Ireland from 1959 to 1961.

He was elected to the Parliament of Norway from Østfold in 1961, and was re-elected on one occasion in 1965. During his two terms he was a member of the Standing Committee on Foreign Affairs and the Standing Committee on Finance respectively, for four years each. Parallel to this, he was a member of the Enlarged Committee on Foreign Affairs and Defence for eight years.

He was decorated as a Knight, First Class of the Order of Vasa in 1945, with the Grand Cross of the Order of the Yugoslav Flag in 1954, as a Commander of the Order of St. Olav in 1957 and Order of Merit of the Federal Republic of Germany in 1959.

From 1940 he was married to consul's daughter Aase Rydtun. He died in July 1988.

Diplomatic posts
Preceded by Jens Schive	Norwegian ambassador to the Soviet Union; 1954–1958	Succeeded by Oscar Christian Gundersen
Preceded by Per Preben Prebensen	Norwegian Ambassador to the United Kingdom; 1959–1961	Succeeded by Arne Skaug
