= Jens Schive =

Norwegian journalist and diplomat (1900–1962)

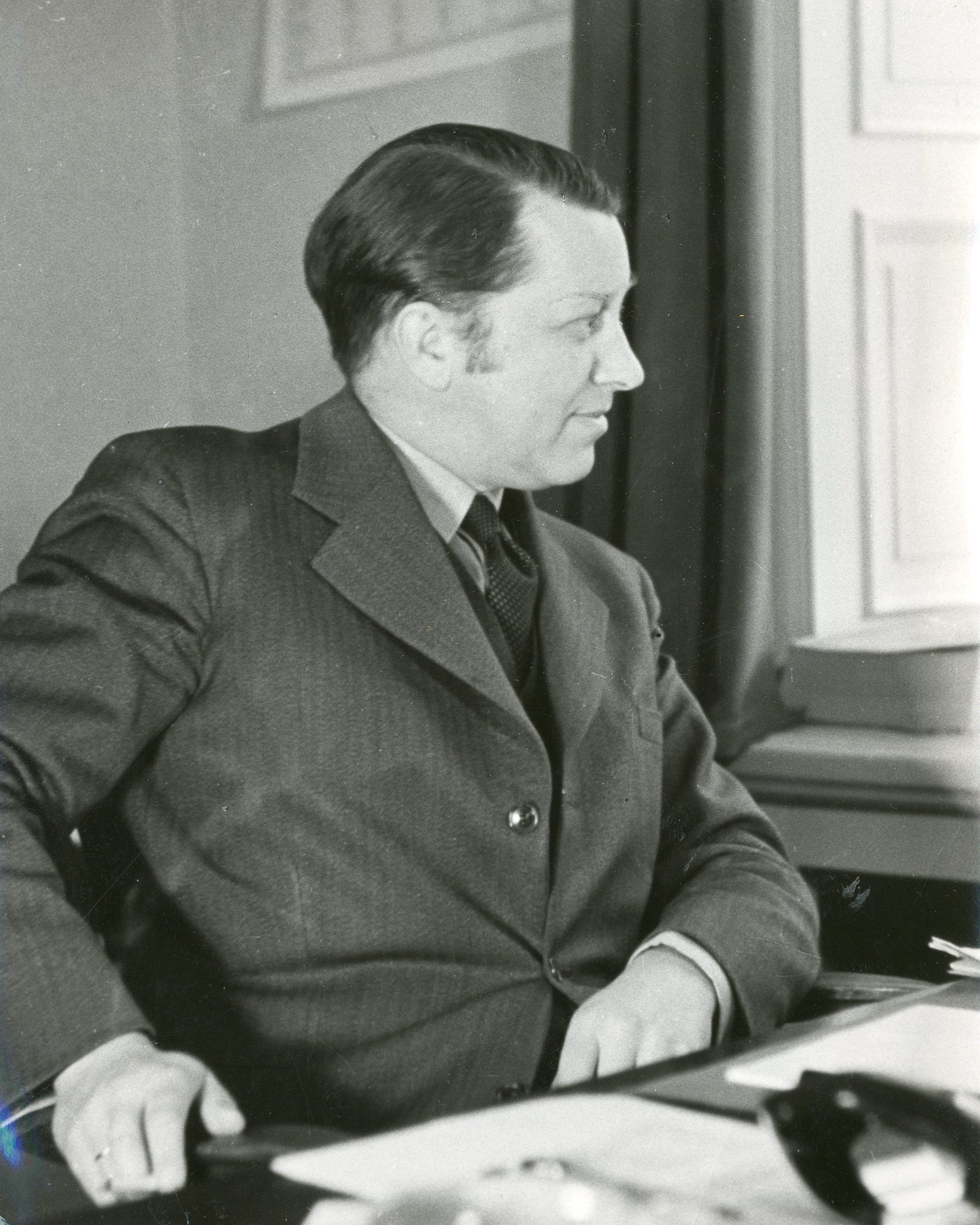
Jens Schive

Jens Schive (18 October 1900 – 17 December 1962) was a Norwegian journalist and diplomat.

== Biography ==
Schive was born in Grimstad, and finished his secondary education in 1918. The same year, however, he started working as a journalist in the newspaper Vestlandske Tidende. In 1920 he left to work for the Norwegian News Agency, where he was made director of the international news department in 1932.

In 1936 he became Morgenbladet's correspondent in Moscow, working from 1937 also for the Norwegian Broadcasting Corporation. In 1939 he accompanied Crown Prince Olav and his wife to the United States, an experience that led him to write the book Med Kronsprinsparet - for Norge! ("With the Crown Prince Couple - for Norway!"). During the German occupation of Norway, from 1940 to 1945, he was press attaché in Stockholm, where he published the newspaper Norges-Nytt.

From 1945 to 1948 he was media director in the Ministry of Foreign Affairs. From 1948 to 1951 he was Norway's representative at the new Indian government in Delhi. In 1951 he was appointed ambassador in Moscow, moving on to Sweden in 1953 and Switzerland in 1961. He died in December 1962, 12 years after his wife Kan Sooth's death (24 January 1950). They had a son together.

== Other sources ==
- Aftenposten (1952). Hvem Hva Hvor 1953 (in Norwegian). Oslo: Schibsted. p. 46.

Diplomatic posts
Preceded by Carsten Helgeby (Lars Jorstad acting)	Norwegian ambassador to the Soviet Union; 1951–1953	Succeeded by Erik Braadland
