= Finn Lied =

Norwegian politician

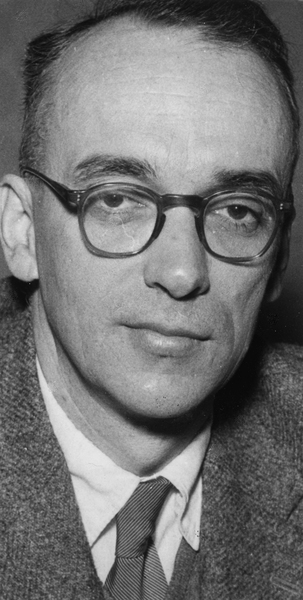
- Lied in 1970

Minister of Trade and Industry
- In office 17 March 1971 – 18 October 1972
- Prime Minister: Trygve Bratteli
- Preceded by: Sverre Walter Rostoft
- Succeeded by: Ola Skjåk Bræk

Personal details
- Born: 12 April 1916 Fana, Norway
- Died: 10 October 2014 (aged 98) Oslo, Norway
- Party: Labour Party

Finn Lied (12 April 1916 – 10 October 2014) was a Norwegian military researcher and politician for the Labour Party. He was particularly known for work on the establishment of the Norwegian state oil company Statoil. His effort to ensure that a large part of the revenues from the oil industry that explored the petroleum deposits under the Norwegian continental shelf was taxed by the Norwegian state was of great importance.

== Career ==
Finn Lied studied electrical engineering at the Norwegian Institute of Technology in Trondheim when Norway was attacked by Nazi-Germany in 1940. Lied fled to Sweden in 1941 and worked for one year with the Norwegian Military Attaché in Stockholm before he went to the United Kingdom. After an officer course, he was employed by the communications department at the Armed Forces High Command in London.

Lied spent almost his entire professional career at the Norwegian Defence Research Establishment (FFI), where he worked from 1946 to 1983, interrupted only by studying and ministerial posts. Lied was director of FFI from 1957 until he retired in 1983, and contributed greatly to shaping the institute. Lied was concerned with the technological importance of research for social development.

Lied was Labour Party politician and Cabinet Minister in the Ministry of Industry in Trygve Bratteli's government from 17 March 1971 to 18 October 1972. He was aware of other countries' experience with rapid oil money having harmful effect on the economy, allowing other businesses to suffer. He observed that in many countries the overwhelming proceeds from the oil industry went to an elite, while only a small part was used to the benefit of the population as a whole. The management scheme and the bold tax system he supported meant that most of the wealth remained in Norway, and the bolstering of the welfare state.

Lied was a driving force for the creation of state-owned oil company Statoil in 1972, where his undersecretary Arve Johnsen was the first CEO. Lied was Chairman of Statoil from 1974 to 1984. Statoil was the instrument of the "nationalization" and entered operational cooperation with major foreign companies had to obey the Norwegian government.

== Support for Israel ==
During the Yom Kippur War, Lied led the action committee Let Israel Live. Later, he was involved in the creation of the friendship association Friends of Israel in the Norwegian Labour Movement ( Norwegian: Venner av Israel i Norsk Arbeiderbevegelse (VINA). From 1978 to 1993 he was a member of the Norwegian Committee for the support of the Jerusalem Shaare Zedek Medical Center.

== Honours ==
In 1980, Lied was appointed commander of the Order of St. Olav. He was also the holder of the Defence Service Medal with Laurel Branch. In 1982 he was made an Honorary Knight Commander of the British Order Royal Victorian Order.

Political offices
Preceded by Sverre Walter Rostoft	Minister of Industry; 1971–1972	Succeeded by Ola Skjåk Bræk
Academic offices
Preceded by Fredrik Møller	Director of the Norwegian Defence Research Establishment; 1957–1983	Succeeded by Erik Klippenberg
Business positions
Preceded by position created	Chair of Statoil; 1974–1984	Succeeded by Inge Johansen
Non-profit organization positions
Preceded by Egil Abrahamsen	Chairman of the Norwegian Polytechnic Society; 1976–1978	Succeeded by Iacob Chr. Prebensen
