= Carl Wilhelm Hartmann =

Norwegian politician (1880–1957)

- Born: 3 July 1880; Kongsberg, Norway
- Died: 25 June 1957 (aged 76)
- Occupations: Public prosecutor Judge; Politician
- Relatives: Paul Ernst Wilhelm Hartmann (brother)

Carl Wilhelm Hartmann (3 July 1880 – 25 June 1957) was a Norwegian public prosecutor, judge and politician.

Hartmann was born in Kongsberg to physician Carl Christian Andreas Hartmann and Marie Sophie Sylow Thorne, and was a brother of Paul Ernst Wilhelm Hartmann. From 1928 to 1930, he served as mayor of Skien. He was elected representative to the Storting for the period 1931–1933 under the Liberal Party.

Hartmann died on 25 June 1957.
