= Ole Vries Hassel =

Norwegian jurist and civil servant

Ole de Vries Hassel (20 September 1894 – 24 July 1984) was a Norwegian jurist and civil servant who represented Nasjonal Samling during the Second World War.

He was born in Kristiania, being of German lineage on the paternal side, and grew up in Øvre Eiker Municipality and Sandar Municipality before finishing his secondary education in Larvik in 1912. He then took the cand.jur. degree in 1916, and after various deputy posts he was hired as a secretary in the Ministry of Justice. Settling in Oslo, he married in 1930 and had three children.

Hassel was promoted to assistant secretary in the Ministry of Justice in 1929, and on 1 July 1940 he was promoted further to deputy under-secretary of state, by decision of the Administrative Council. The Administrative Council had assumed authority, after the German invasion of Norway, but were soon ousted in favor of a government of the Fascist party Nasjonal Samling (NS). Hassel joined this party, and was transferred to the newly created Ministry of the Interior. During 1941, Hassel was responsible for an important part of the reforms that would produce the Fascist "New Order" in Norway: a restructuring of municipal government that successfully replaced all elected bodies with top-down rule by mayors, who either went over to the NS or were replaced by NS party members.

From 1942 to 1943 he served as the County Governor of Hedmark. He was also appointed as chairman of both the Union of Norwegian Cities and the Norwegian Association of Rural Municipalities, merging them into one association in 1942 which he also chaired, and represented Norway in the International Union of Local Authorities.

After the war, in 1948, Ole de Vries Hassel was convicted for treason and sentenced to three and a half years of forced labour. He was also banned indefinitely from the Ministry of Justice. After his release he worked as an attorney in Oslo from 1953, later in his native Sandar. He died in 1984.
