= List of diocesan governors of Hamar =

The diocesan governor of Hamar stiftamt in Norway was a government agency of the Kingdom of Norway. The title was Stiftamtmann before 1919, and in 1919 all stiftamt were abolished in favor of equal counties (Norwegian: fylker).

The stiftamt (principal county) of Hamar was established in 1864 by the king. It was split off from the large Christiania stiftamt and originally made up of two subordinate counties: Kristians amt and Hedemarkens amt. Hamar stiftamt was led by a stiftamtmann and the subordinate counties were led by an amtmann. The seat of the stiftamt was the city of Hamar. In 1919, there was a large county reorganization in Norway and every stiftamt was abolished and the counties were renamed fylker.

The diocesan governor is the government's representative in the diocese which was made up of multiple subordinate counties. The governor carries out the resolutions and guidelines of the Storting and government. This is done first by the governor performing administrative tasks on behalf of the ministries. Secondly, the diocesan governor also monitors the activities of the county governors and the municipalities and is the appeal body for many types of municipal decisions.

== List of diocesan governors ==
Hamar stiftamt has had the following governors:

County governors of Hamar stiftamt
Start	End	Name
1864	1890	Ludvig Kyhn (1817–1890); Served concurrently as Amtmann for Hedemarkens amt.
1890	1890	Truls Wiel Graff (1851–1918); Acting governor after Kyhn's death. Served concurrently as acting Amtmann for Hedemarkens amt.
1890	1897	Oscar Mørch (1845–1897); Served concurrently as Amtmann for Hedemarkens amt.
1897	1898	August Teilmann Wilhelmsen (1861–1906); Acting governor after Mørch's death. Served concurrently as acting Amtmann for Hedemarkens amt.
1898	1915	Gregers Winther Wulfsberg Gram (1846–1929); Served concurrently as Amtmann for Hedemarkens amt.
1914	1916	Johannes Irgens (1869–1939); Acting governor for Gram. Served concurrently as acting Amtmann for Hedemarkens amt.
1916	1918	Thorvald Løchen (1861–1943); Served concurrently as Amtmann for Hedemarkens amt.
Office abolished on 1 January 1919.
