= Hallvard Eika =

Norwegian politician

Minister of Trade and Shipping
- In office 18 October 1972 – 16 October 1973
- Prime Minister: Lars Korvald
- Preceded by: Per Kleppe
- Succeeded by: Jens Evensen

Minister of Agriculture
- In office 21 August 1970 – 17 March 1971
- Prime Minister: Per Borten
- Preceded by: Bjarne Lyngstad
- Succeeded by: Thorstein Treholt

Minister of Nordic Cooperation
- In office 18 October 1972 – 16 October 1973
- Prime Minister: Lars Korvald
- Preceded by: Per Kleppe
- Succeeded by: Bjartmar Gjerde

Member of the Norwegian Parliament
- In office 1 October 1969 – 30 September 1977
- Constituency: Telemark

Personal details
- Born: 5 December 1920 Torquay, Saskatchewan, Canada
- Died: 17 May 1989 (aged 68) Bø, Norway
- Party: Liberal
- Spouse: Aslaug Vethe (1959–1986; her death)

Hallvard Eika (5 December 1920 – 17 May 1989) was a Norwegian politician for the Liberal Party.

He was elected to the Norwegian Parliament from Telemark in 1969, and was re-elected on one occasion. During his first term he served twice in different cabinets. On 21 August 1970 he was appointed Minister of Agriculture during the centre-right cabinet Borten, replacing Bjarne Lyngstad. He held the position until the cabinet Borten fell in 1971. Meanwhile, Eika was busy with his appointment to the Borten cabinet, Sigurd Kalheim took his seat in Parliament.

When the next centrist government was formed in 1972 by Prime Minister Lars Korvald, Eika was appointed Minister of Trade and Shipping and again had to leave his seat in Parliament. Again he was replaced by Sigurd Kalheim, who then left the Liberal Party for the Liberal People's Party two months into his tenure. Eika was re-elected to Parliament at the 1973 general elections. He was still a member of the Korvald cabinet for some weeks, until Trygve Bratteli formed his second cabinet, upon which point Eika returned to serve as a Parliament representative. Eivind Øygarden had acted as replacement him during this short period.

Eika was mayor of Bø Municipality in 1967–1970, and then served as a municipal council member in the periods 1970–1971, 1975–1979 and 1979–1983.

Outside politics he graduated from the Norwegian College of Agriculture in 1946. From 1977 to 1985 he was director of agriculture in Telemark county.

| Preceded by Ole Rømer Aagaard Sandberg | Chairman of the Norwegian Agrarian Association; 1955–1966 | Succeeded by Johan A. Vikan |
| Preceded by Bjarne Lyngstad | Norwegian Minister of Agriculture; 1970–1971 | Succeeded by Thorstein Treholt |
| Preceded by Per Andreas Kleppe | Norwegian Minister of Trade and Shipping; 1972–1973 | Succeeded by Jens Ingebret Evensen |
