= Second Gerhardsen cabinet =

Government of Norway from 1945 to 1951

Gerhardsen's Second Cabinet
- Cabinet of Norway

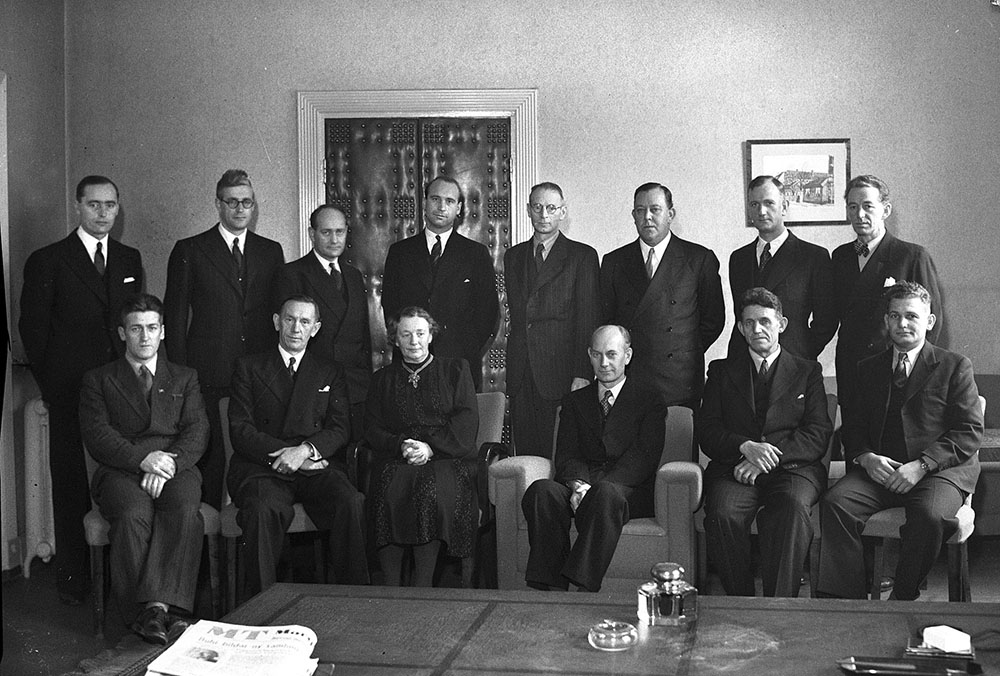
- Einar Gerhardsen's second cabinet, 1945
- Date formed: 5 November 1945
- Date dissolved: 19 November 1951

People and organisations
- King: Haakon VII of Norway
- Prime Minister: Einar Gerhardsen
- No. of ministers: 15
- Member party: Labour Party
- Status in legislature: Majority government

History
- Elections: 1945 parliamentary election 1949 parliamentary election
- Legislature terms: 1945-1949; 1949-1953
- Predecessor: Gerhardsen's First Cabinet
- Successor: Torp's Cabinet

Gerhardsen's Second Cabinet governed Norway between 5 November 1945 and 19 November 1951. The Labour Party (Ap) cabinet was led by Einar Gerhardsen.

In May 1948, Gerhardsen told Jens Chr Hauge, that he was considering resigning. Furthermore, as candidates for prime minister, Gerhardsen named Torp, Sverre Støstad and Lars Evensen.

On 17 June 1948 parliament started its deliberations about the Helset Case. Something Gerhardsen knew, but did not tell parliament, was that he had certain evidence, that "either at the US embassy or in the top leadership of Norway's Armed Forces there were people who were willing to leak top secret info about then minister of defence's conversations with US military attaché, winter and spring 1948, in an attempt to force" the defence minister out of office—with or without the knowledge of Olaf Helset. Later in 1948 Olaf Helset resigned.

== Cabinet members ==
Portfolio	Minister	Took office	Left office	Party
Prime Minister	Einar Gerhardsen	5 November 1945	19 November 1951	Labour
Minister of Foreign Affairs	Trygve Lie	5 November 1945	2 February 1946	Labour
Minister of Foreign Affairs	Halvard Lange	2 February 1946	19 November 1951	Labour
Minister of Finance and Customs	Erik Brofoss	5 November 1945	6 December 1947	Labour
Minister of Finance and Customs	Olav Meisdalshagen	6 December 1947	19 November 1951	Labour
Minister of Defence	Jens Christian Hauge	5 November 1945	19 November 1951	Labour
Minister of Justice and the Police	O. C. Gundersen	5 November 1945	19 November 1951	Labour
Minister of Transport and Communications	Nils Langhelle	22 February 1946	19 November 1951	Labour
Minister of Local Government and Labour	Ulrik Olsen	20 December 1948	19 November 1951	Labour
Minister of Education and Church Affairs	Kaare Fostervoll	5 November 1945	28 June 1948	Labour
Minister of Education and Church Affairs	Lars Moen	28 June 1948	19 November 1951	Labour
Minister of Labour	Nils Langhelle	5 November 1945	22 February 1946	Labour
Minister of Social Affairs	Sven Oftedal (Note: Leave of absence from 18 May 1948.)	5 November 1945	23 June 1948	Labour
Minister of Social Affairs	Aaslaug Aasland (Note: Acting minister from 18 May to 20 December 1948.)	20 December 1948	19 November 1951	Labour
Minister of Agriculture	Kristian Fjeld (Note: Olav Oksvik was acting minister from 6 December 1947 to 6 March 1948.)	5 November 1945	19 November 1951	Labour
Minister of Industry	Lars Evensen (Note: Arne Drogseth was acting minister from 29 June to 11 November 1951.)	6 December 1947	19 November 1951	Labour
Minister of Trade and Shipping	Erik Brofoss	6 December 1947	19 November 1951	Labour
Minister of Fisheries	Reidar Carlsen	1 July 1946	19 November 1951	Labour
Minister of Provisioning and Reconstruction	Oscar Torp	5 November 1945	10 January 1948	Labour
Minister of Provisioning and Reconstruction	Nils Hønsvald	10 January 1948	14 September 1950	Labour
Consulative Minister	Aaslaug Aasland	5 November 1945	20 December 1948	Labour
Consulative Minister	Peder Holt	5 November 1945	30 June 1948	Labour
Consulative Minister	Reidar Carlsen	5 November 1945	1 July 1946	Labour
