= Erling Anger =

Norwegian civil servant (1909–1999)

Erling Anger (17 April 1909 – 22 April 1999) was a Norwegian civil servant.

He was born in Kristiansund, and is a cand.jur. by education. He was hired as chief administrative officer of finances in Trondheim in 1950, and as County Governor of Møre og Romsdal in 1958. In 1965 he served as acting permanent under-secretary of state in the Ministry of Local Government and Labour, before serving as County Governor of Hedmark from 1966 to 1979. From 1980 to 1984 he chaired the Labour Court of Norway.

He was buried in Hamar.

Civic offices
Preceded by Olav Oksvik	County Governor of Møre og Romsdal; 1958–1966	Succeeded by Erling Sandene
Preceded by position created	Permanent under-secretary of state in the Ministry of Local Government; 1965–1966 (acting)	Succeeded by Kai Knagenhjelm
Preceded by Alf Frydenberg	County Governor of Hedmark; 1966–1979	Succeeded by Anfinn Lund
