= Kai Knudsen =

Norwegian judge and politician

Minister of Defence
- In office 15 June 1954 – 22 January 1955
- Prime Minister: Oscar Torp
- Preceded by: Nils Langhelle
- Succeeded by: Nils Handal

Minister of Justice
- In office 20 December 1952 (Note: Acting from 18 October 1952 until permanent from 20 December.) – 15 June 1954
- Prime Minister: Oscar Torp
- Preceded by: O. C. Gundersen
- Succeeded by: Gustav Sjaastad

Personal details
- Born: Kai Birger Knudsen; 25 June 1903 Vardø, Finnmark, Sweden-Norway
- Died: 3 March 1977 (aged 73)
- Party: Labour
- Spouse: Lilli Margrethe Wergeland (m. 1943)

Kai Birger Knudsen (25 June 1903 – 3 March 1977) was a Norwegian judge and politician for the Labour Party.

He was born in Vardø as a son of kemner Kai Angell Knudsen (1869–1944) and Julie Huse (1873–1952). He finished his secondary education in 1922, and graduated with the cand.jur. degree in 1926. He worked as an auditor in Haugesund 1926-1927, then deputy judge for the Heddal District Court from 1928-1930, and junior solicitor in Notodden Municipality 1930-1935. After the war he was acting district stipendiary magistrate (sorenskriver) of Tinn and Heddal District Court from 1945 to 1946, and also mayor of Notodden Municipality during the same period. As an elected politician he served in the position of deputy representative to the Parliament of Norway from the Market towns of Telemark and Aust-Agder counties during the term 1945–1949. He then worked in the Office of the State Conciliator of Norway from 1946 to 1948.

From 1948, he worked as a Secretary for the Prime Minister (from 1956 known as "State Secretary in the Office of the Prime Minister"). During Torp's Cabinet Knudsen became acting Minister of Justice and the Police from 18 October 1952 to 20 December 1952, then on a permanent basis until 15 June 1954. His successor Gustav Sjaastad studied law in the same period as Knudsen, from 1922 to 1926. Knudsen served as Minister of Defence until the cabinet change in 1955. In the new Gerhardsen's Third Cabinet Knudsen was appointed Secretary to the Prime Minister again, but left in late 1955.

Knudsen was then district stipendiary magistrate in Indre Follo District Court from 1955 to 1973. He chaired the board of the Norwegian Directorate of Labour from 1950 to 1975 as well as the National Wages Board from 1955 to 1968.

In 1943, he married Lilli Margrethe Wergeland, a sister of Harald Wergeland. He died in March 1977.

== Notes ==
Political offices
Preceded by O. C. Gundersen	Norwegian Minister of Justice and the Police; 1952–1954	Succeeded by Gustav Sjaastad
Preceded by Nils Langhelle	Norwegian Minister of Defence; 1954–1955	Succeeded by Nils Handal
