= Martha Larsen Jahn =

Norwegian activist

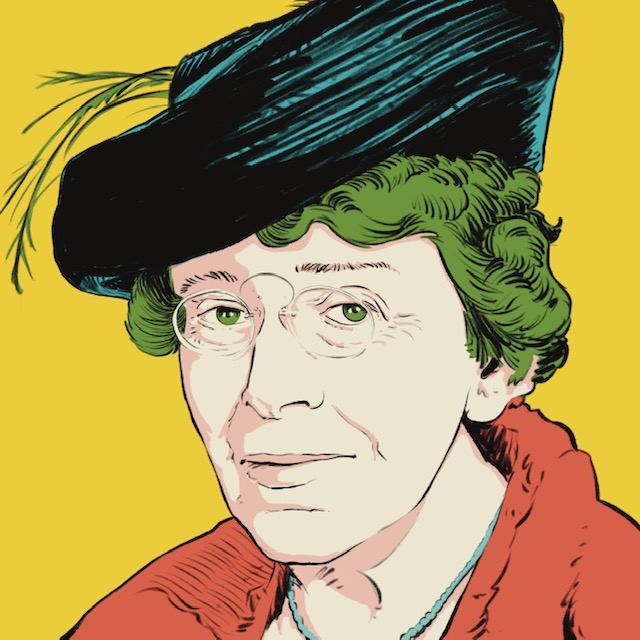
- Born: Martha Emily Larsen; 17 April 1875; Christiania, Norway
- Died: 2 August 1954 (aged 79); Oslo, Norway
- Occupation: Activist
- Spouse: Gunnar Jahn

Martha Emily Larsen Jahn (17 April 1875 – 2 August 1954) was a Norwegian peace and women's activist.

She was born in Christiania as a daughter of wholesaler Christian Larsen and Sanda Plate. In April 1911, she married Gunnar Jahn, politician and director of Statistics Norway.

After finishing her secondary education in 1895, she studied languages in Scotland and Germany from 1895 to 1896. She worked as an office clerk from 1897, then at the Deichman Library from 1898, completing a librarian's education at New York State Library School in 1902. She then worked at Trondhjem Public Library from 1902 to 1911, meeting and marrying her husband in the city, then as secretary at the Norwegian National Academy of Craft and Art Industry. From 1910 to 1913 she worked for the Ministry of Education and Church Affairs as an inspector of public libraries. After 1915, she held no paid job and devoted all her time to volunteer organizational work.

In 1915, she became a board member of Internasjonal kvinneliga for fred og frihet, the Norwegian branch of the Women's International League for Peace and Freedom which was founded in the same year. From 1919 to 1929, she was also a board member of the international organization, and from 1925 to 1934, she chaired the Norwegian branch. In 1949, she became an honorary member.

She was also a Norwegian delegate to the League of Nations from 1925 to 1927, working committee of the Norwegian Women's Public Health Association from 1925 and chair from 1935 to 1948. Significant results during her time as an activist include a signature campaign of 80,000 participants for a disarmament conference in 1932, and the doubling of Women's Public Health Association membership from about 100,000 to 200,000. Under Jahn's leadership, the Women's Public Health Association also managed to stay independent during the occupation of Norway by Nazi Germany.

She died in August 1954 in Oslo.

== See also ==
- List of peace activists
