= Jens Evensen =

Norwegian politician (1917–2004)

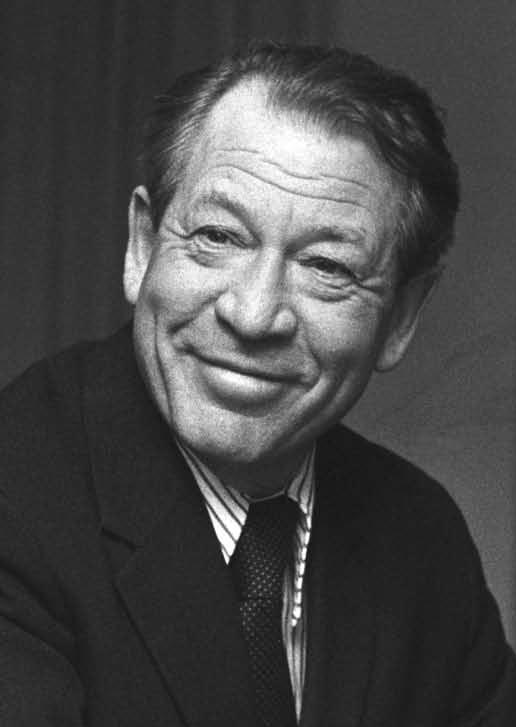
- Evensen in 1974

Minister of Trade and Shipping
- In office 16 October 1973 – 27 September 1974
- Prime Minister: Trygve Bratteli
- Preceded by: Hallvard Eika
- Succeeded by: Einar Magnussen

Minister of Maritime Law
- In office 27 September 1974 – 1 January 1979
- Prime Minister: Trygve Bratteli; Odvar Nordli
- Preceded by: Position established
- Succeeded by: Position abolished

Personal details
- Born: Jens Ingebret Evensen; 5 November 1917 Christiania, Norway
- Died: 15 February 2004 (aged 86) Asker, Norway
- Party: Labour
- Spouse: Sylvei Evensen
- Children: 2

Jens Ingebret Evensen (5 November 1917 – 15 February 2004) was a Norwegian lawyer, judge, politician (for the Labour Party), trade minister, international offshore rights expert, member of the International Law Commission and judge at the International Court of Justice in The Hague.

He negotiated Norway's trading deal with European Economic Community in 1972 as minister of commerce in which he served in the governments of both Trygve Bratteli and Odvar Nordli. He then served as maritime law minister until 1979. He worked to secure government income from Norwegian oil discoveries. The UN's oceans treaty (1982) is fundamentally based on Evensen's work.

== Early life ==
Evensen grew up in a labour environment in Oslo (called Kristiania until 1925). He was the son Jens Evensen (1877–1957) and Hanna Marie Victoria Bjerkås (1885–1958). His father was a successful butcher in Grønland. His father routinely gave out meat and sausages to the underprivileged on the east side of Oslo and Evensen himself helped out to support those who had no work or food. Evensen was originally to take over his father's butcher business

In 1936 Evensen enrolled in the University of Oslo Law School. His first job after he graduated was at the law firm Folkvard Bugge. The firm specialized in helping tenants to enforce their legal right to buy the apartments they lived in. Evensen helped the tenants, many of whom were illiterate, and explained the rights they had.

During the German occupation of Norway, Evensen volunteered in the Norwegian resistance movement, helping, among other things, to create false identity papers. After World War II, he was appointed attorney in fact and prosecutor a number of treasons trials the Norwegian government brought against collaborators during the post-war legal purge. Here he began the extensive work of finding what collaborationist leader Vidkun Quisling and his subordinates had stolen during the war. Nonetheless, Evensen distanced himself from the death penalty eventually handed to Quisling.

In 1947, he went to the United States to further his education. He was granted a scholarship by John D. Rockefeller Jr. and began his study at Harvard University. This was an international environment where he got to know and befriend many people from the oil business.

== Career ==
Evensen led the Norwegian Foreign Ministry's legal department from 1961 to 1973. Norway was unprepared when representatives from Phillips Petroleum in the US came to Norway in 1962 to request oil exploration rights in the North Sea. Evensen took up the challenge, and proceeded to develop the foundation for the country's legal claims to the Norwegian continental shelf. Former prime ministers Odvar Nordli and Kaare Willoch praised Evensen's work on securing Norway's rights to offshore resources, which, in turn, spawned the country's oil industry.

He later became a politician, campaigning against joining the European Economic Community. He also served as trade minister for the Labour Party. He was both respected and controversial and angered fellow Labour Party officials when he agreed to shared management of fishing resources in the Barents Sea with the Soviet Union.

His top aide, Arne Treholt, was later convicted of spying for the Soviet Union, and Evensen reportedly never got over the shock and disappointment.

Evensen also came into conflict with foreign minister Knut Frydenlund in 1980, when he supported a nuclear-free zone in the Nordic Countries.

== Later life ==
He remained an international expert on offshore rights and contributed to the creation of economic zones extending 200 nautical miles (370 km) out to sea. He later became a judge at the international court in The Hague, sitting until 1993.

He died in February 2004.

== Honors ==
- Swedish Order of the Polar Star
- Commander of the Royal Norwegian Order of St. Olav
- honorary Doctorate from Heriot-Watt University in 1974.

== Other sources ==
- Berit Ruud Retzer (1999) Jens Evensen: Makten, myten og mennesket : en uautorisert biografi (Oslo] : BBG Forl.) ISBN 978-8299506809

Political offices
Preceded by Hallvard Eika	Norwegian Minister of Trade and Shipping; 1973–1974	Succeeded by Einar Magnussen
