= Jakob Martin Pettersen =

Norwegian politician

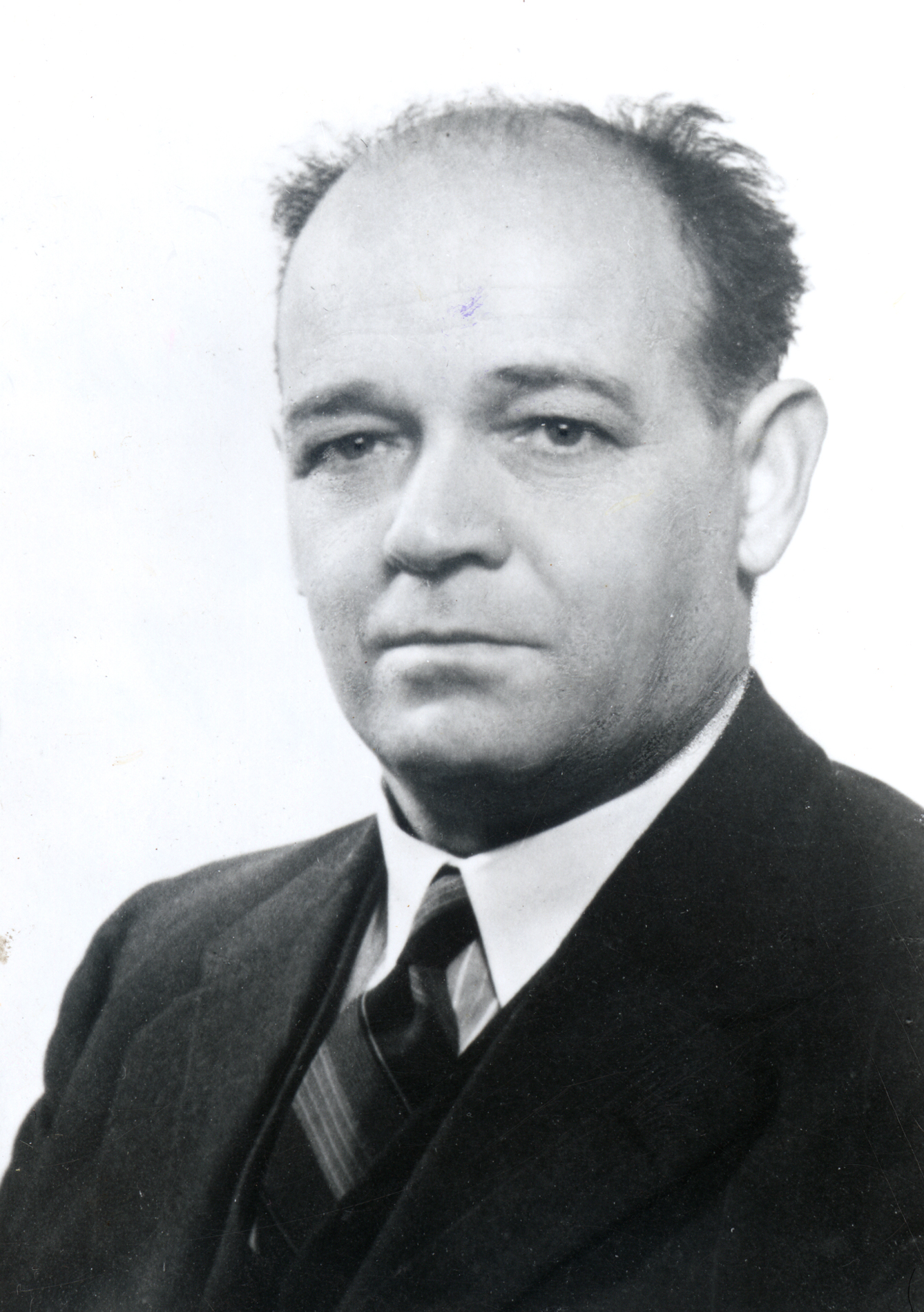

Vice President of the Odelsting
- In office 1 October 1959 – 30 September 1965
- President: Alv Kjøs; Per Borten
- Preceded by: Peder Leier Jacobsen
- Succeeded by: Hans Borgen

Minister of Transport and Communications
- In office 5 January 1952 – 22 January 1955
- Prime Minister: Oscar Torp
- Preceded by: Nils Langhelle
- Succeeded by: Kolbjørn Varmann

Member of the Norwegian Parliament
- In office 1 October 1945 – 30 September 1965
- Constituency: Hordaland

Personal details
- Born: 11 April 1899 Bergen, Norway
- Died: 8 February 1970 (aged 70) Wollongong, Australia
- Party: Labour Party

Jakob Martin Pettersen (11 April 1899 – 8 February 1970) was a Norwegian politician for the Labour Party and Minister of Transport and Communications 1952–1955.

Born in Bergen to a factory worker and his wife, Pettersen studied chemistry at Bergen tekniske skole (now part of Bergen University College). He started working in Odda in 1921; from 1924 to 1945 he worked as a chemist at Odda Smelteverk.

In 1928, he became a member of the municipal council of Odda and served as vice-mayor from 1932 to 1940. He was elected mayor in 1945 and held the position until 1947.

He was elected to the Parliament of Norway in 1945 and served until 1965; from 1959 as vice-president of Odelstinget. From 1952 to 1955, he was Minister of Transport and Communications.

He held leadership and other elected positions in several temperance organisations.

Preceded by Nils Langhelle	Norwegian Minister of Transport and Communications; 1952–1955	Succeeded by Kolbjørn Sigurd Werner Varmann
