= Gustav Sjaastad =

Norwegian lawyer and politician

County Governor of Nord-Trøndelag
- In office 1 October 1959 – 7 May 1964
- Prime Minister: Einar Gerhardsen; John Lyng
- Preceded by: Asbjørn Lindboe
- Succeeded by: Ole Bae

Member of the Norwegian Parliament
- In office 1 January 1958 – 30 September 1961
- Constituency: Nord-Trøndelag

Minister of Industry
- In office 22 January 1955 – 9 April 1959
- Prime Minister: Einar Gerhardsen
- Preceded by: Nils Handal
- Succeeded by: Kjell Holler

Minister of Justice
- In office 15 June 1954 – 22 January 1955
- Prime Minister: Oscar Torp
- Preceded by: Kai Birger Knudsen
- Succeeded by: Jens Chr. Hauge

Personal details
- Born: Gustav Adolf Sjaastad; 6 April 1902 Skogn Municipality, Nordre Trondheim, Sweden-Norway
- Died: 7 May 1964 (aged 62)
- Party: Labour

Gustav Adolf Sjaastad (6 April 1902 – 7 May 1964) was a Norwegian lawyer and politician for the Labour Party. He served as Minister of Justice from 1954–1955 and Minister of Industry from 1955–1959, and also as County Governor of Nord-Trøndelag from 1959–1964.

== Early life and career ==
He was born in Skogn Municipality as a son of farmer Olaf Herman Sjaastad (1869–1944) and Marta Fostad (1870–1933). He enrolled as a student in 1922, and graduated with the cand.jur. degree in 1926. He opened an attorney's office in Namsos in 1927. From 1933 he was a barrister, with access to work with Supreme Court cases. He was a member of the executive committee of the municipal council of Namsos Municipality from 1927 to 1934, representing the Liberal Party, whose local party chapter he chaired from 1927 to 1931.

In 1935 he opened a lawyer's office in Oslo. During World War II he was a member of the Norwegian resistance movement. He was arrested in December 1940 for "spying", and was imprisoned until May 1941 at Møllergata 19. In February 1944 he was arrested for the second time, this time for being involved in an illegal newspaper. He was imprisoned at Møllergata 19 again, before being transferred to Grini concentration camp, where he sat from May 1944 to the war's end on 8 May 1945.

== Political career ==
From 1945 to 1954 he was a legal consultant for the Workers' National Trade Union (named Norwegian Confederation of Trade Unions from 1957). He also became a member of several public committees in 1946 and 1947, including Arbeidstvistkomiteen av 1946, Ferielovkomiteen and Pris- og rasjonaliseringskomiteen. From 1954 to 1955, during Torp's Cabinet, Sjaastad was the Minister of Justice. Upon the cabinet change to Gerhardsen's Third Cabinet in 1955, he became Minister of Industry and held that post until 1959. He was elected to the Parliament of Norway from Nord-Trøndelag in 1958, and until 1959 his seat in parliament was taken by Hans Mikal Solsem. Sjaastad was not re-elected in 1961. His career ended with the post of County Governor of Nord-Trøndelag, which he held from 1959 to 1964. He died in May 1964.

Sjaastad was a member of the board of Nord-Trøndelag Elektrisitetsverk from 1959 to 1964, Norsk Hydro from 1946 to 1955, Folla from 1959 to 1964, Mosjøen Veveri from 1960 to 1964 and Det Norske Teatret. He was chairman of the board of Fylkesbilene from 1959 to 1964 and Tiden Norsk Forlag from 1947 to 1954. He was decorated as a Commander of the Order of the Polar Star in 1960.

Political offices
| Preceded by Kai Knudsen | Norwegian Minister of Justice; 1954–1955 | Succeeded by Jens Christian Hauge |
| Preceded by Nils Handal | Norwegian Minister of Industry; 1955–1959 | Succeeded by Kjell Holler |
Civic offices
| Preceded by Asbjørn Lindboe | County Governor of Nord-Trøndelag; 1959–1964 | Succeeded by Ole Bae |
