= List of county governors of Hedmark =

Hedmark coat of arms

Norway

The county governor of Hedmark county in Norway represented the central government administration in the county. The office of county governor is a government agency of the Kingdom of Norway; the title was Amtmann (before 1919) and then Fylkesmann (after 1919). On 1 January 2019, the office was merged with the County Governor of Oppland into the County Governor of Innlandet.

The large Akershus stiftamt was established in 1664 by the King and it had several subordinate counties (amt). On 11 April 1781, the large Kristians amt was divided into two: Hedemarkens amt (later named "Hedmark") in the east and Kristians amt (later named "Oppland") in the west. In 2020, Hedmark and Oppland counties were merged into Innlandet county.

The county governor is the government's representative in the county. The governor carries out the resolutions and guidelines of the Storting and Government. This is done first by the county governor performing administrative tasks on behalf of the ministries. Secondly, the county governor also monitors the activities of the municipalities and is the appeal body for many types of municipal decisions.

== Names ==
The word for county (amt or fylke) has changed over time as has the name of the county. From 1781 until 1918, the title was Amtmann i Hedemarkens amt. From 1 January 1919 until 1 January 2019, the title was Fylkesmann i Hedmark fylke.

== List of county governors ==
Hedmark county has had the following governors:

County governors of Hedmark
Start	End	Name
1781	1789	Ditlev von Pentz (1744–1821)
1789	1802	Andreas Høyer (1742–1817)
1802	1804	Nicolai Emanuel de Thygeson (1772–1860)
1804	1816	Claus Bendeke (1764–1828)
1817	1821	Lauritz Weidemann (1775–1856)
1821	1849	Fredrik Hartvig Johan Heidmann (1777–1850)
1849	1856	August Christian Manthey (1811–1880)
1856	1890	Ludvig Kyhn (1817–1890); Served concurrently as Stiftamtmann for Hamar stiftamt (1864-1890).
1890	1890	Truls Wiel Graff (1851–1918); Acting governor after Kyhn's death. Served concurrently as acting Stiftamtmann for Hamar stiftamt.
1890	1897	Oscar Mørch (1845–1897); Served concurrently as Stiftamtmann for Hamar stiftamt.
1897	1898	August Teilmann Wilhelmsen (1861–1906); Acting governor after Mørch's death. Served concurrently as acting Stiftamtmann for Hamar stiftamt.
1898	1915	Gregers Winther Wulfsberg Gram (1846–1929); Served concurrently as Stiftamtmann for Hamar stiftamt.
1914	1916	Johannes Irgens (1869–1939); Acting governor for Gram. Served concurrently as acting Stiftamtmann for Hamar stiftamt.
1916	1926	Thorvald Løchen (1861–1943); Served concurrently as Stiftamtmann for Hamar stiftamt (1916-1918).
1926	1935	Knud Iversen Øyen (1865–1942)
1935	1953	Knut Monssen Nordanger (1883–1965) (Imprisoned by WWII Occupied government in 1942.)
25 Jan 1942	1943	Ole Vries Hassel (1894–1984) (WWII Occupied government)
1943	1945	Halvor Pedersen Hektoen (1884–1960) (WWII Occupied government)
1954	1966	Alf Frydenberg (1896–1989)
1966	1979	Erling Anger (1909–1999)
1979	1981	Annfinn Lund (1926–2001)
11 March 1981	17 March 1994	Odvar Nordli (1927–2018)
1994	1996	Kjell Borgen (1939–1996)
1996	1997	Ola Skjølaas (1941–2006); Acting for Borgen
1 Oct 1996	31 Dec 2018	Sigbjørn Johnsen (1950–present)
April; 1997	October; 1997	Jon Arvid Lea (1948–present); Acting for Johnsen
October; 2009	February; 2010	Tormod W. Karlstrøm (1944–present); Acting for Johnsen
February; 2010	2013	Sylvia Brustad (1966–present); Acting for Johnsen
1 Jan 2019	31 Dec 2019	Knut Storberget (1964–present)
Office abolished on 1 January 2019. See List of county governors of Innlandet
