= Arne Drogseth =

Norwegian politician

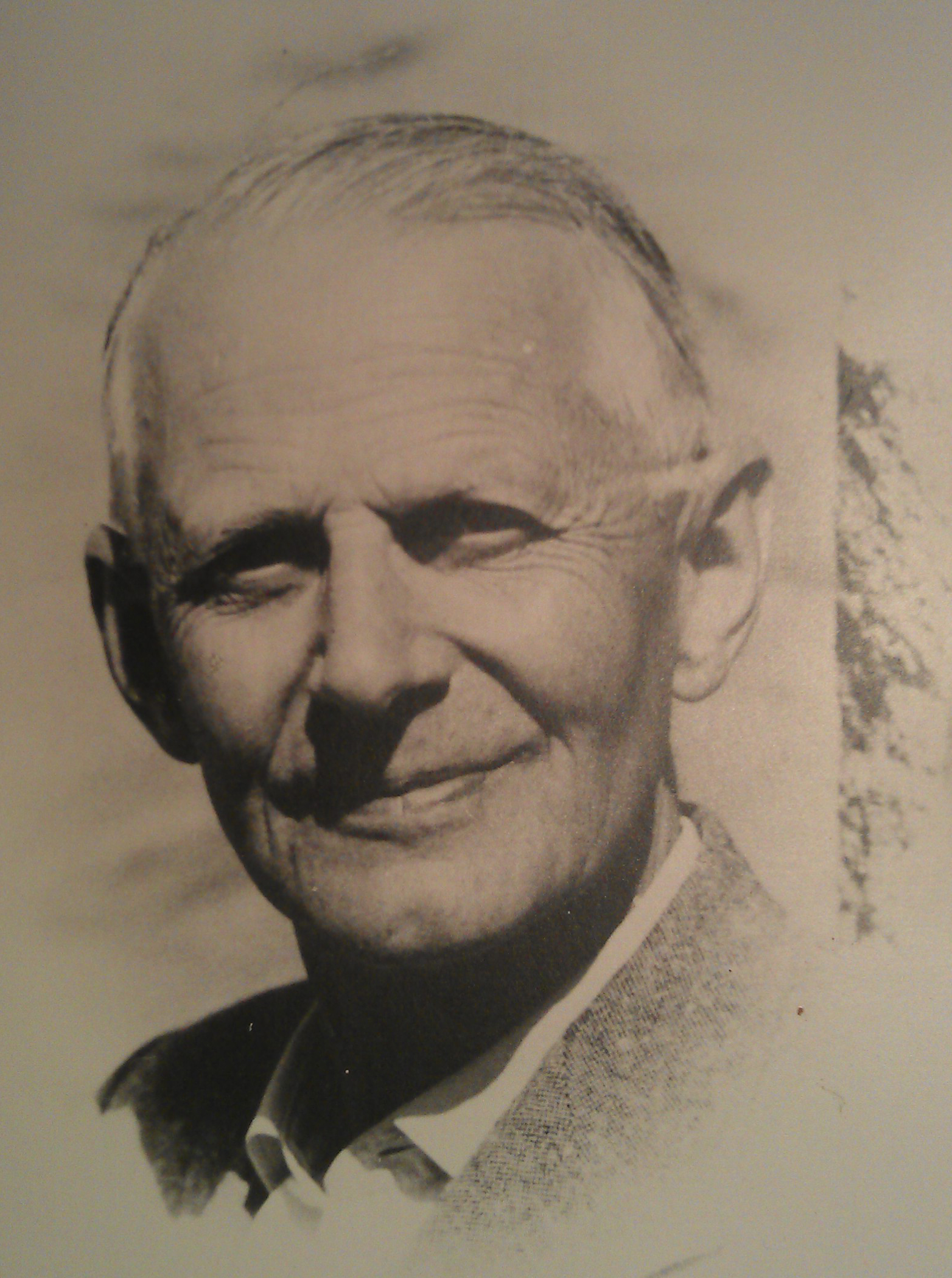
Arne Drogseth

Arne Gulbrand Drogseth (5 January 1893 – 11 February 1973) was a Norwegian politician for the Labour Party.

Drogseth started his national political career as a deputy member of the Parliament of Norway in the period 1937–45. He served as private secretary to the Minister of Trade 1946–1947, state secretary to the Minister of Trade in 1947, and state secretary to the Minister of Industry 1947–1951. On 29 June 1951, he was made acting Minister of Industry when Jens Evensen took leave of absence. His tenure was short, however, as the second cabinet of Einar Gerhardsen resigned on 19 November the same year.

Drogseth was a mining engineer by profession, and after his resignation from the government he served as manager of the mining company Norsk Bergverk until 1963.
