= Bergen Handelsgymnasium =

Upper secondary school in Bergen, Norway

Coordinates: 60.3905°N 5.3370°E

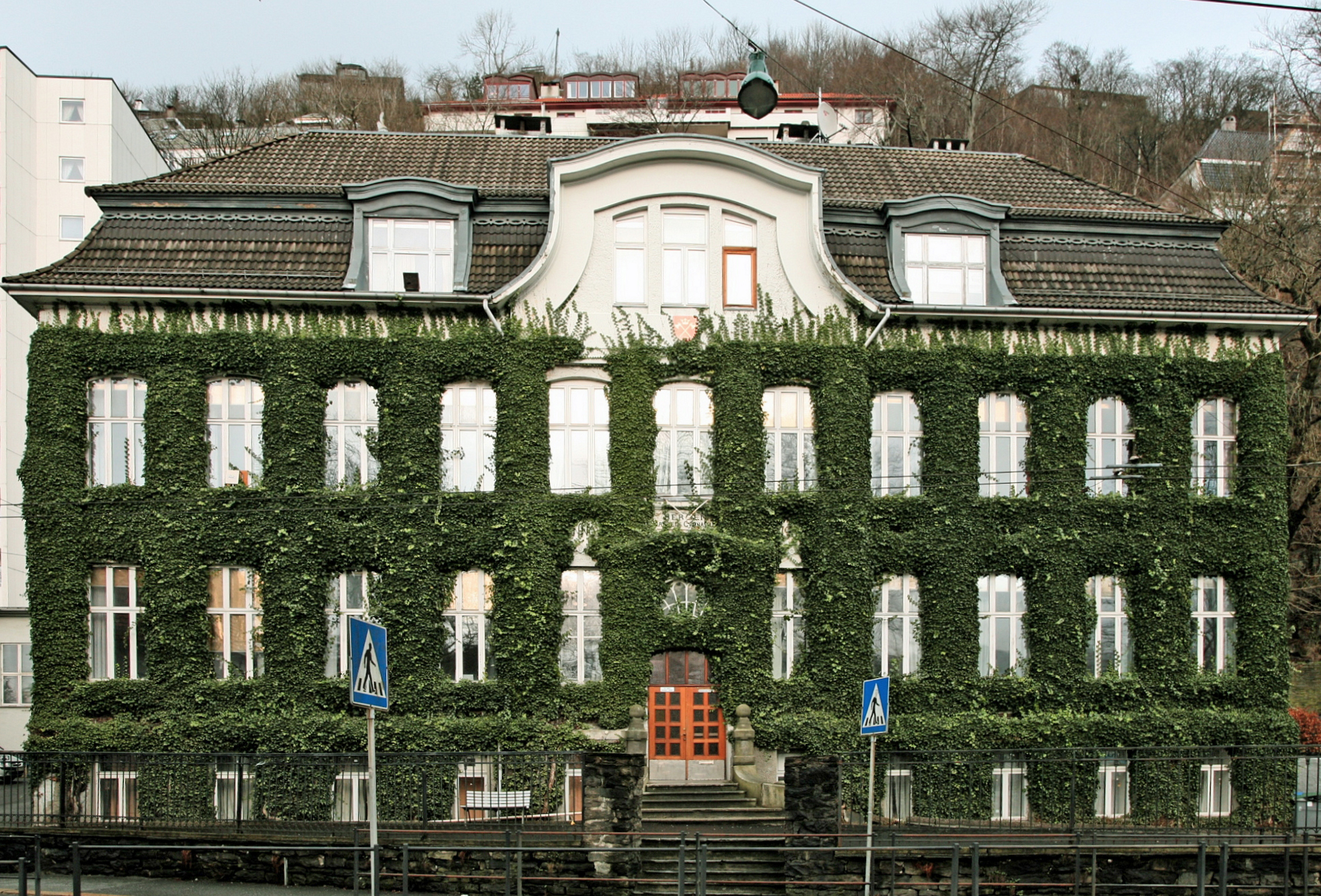

Information
- Established: 1904
- Closed: June 2014

Bergen Handelsgymnasium (BHG) was an upper secondary school in Bergen, Norway. Established in 1904, it was one of the oldest gymnasia in the country. The school was known to have high admission requirements and able pupils. Furthermore, the school was known for its projects regarding internationalization, differentiation and interdisciplinarity. It closed for good in June 2014.

== History ==
Bergens Handelsgymnasium was established in 1904. Its architect was Jens Zetlitz Monrad Kielland, a nephew of the novelist Alexander Kielland. In 1976, Hordaland County Council took over the running of the school.

In 2006, the school won a Holberg Prize, with a project on school lunches. The same year, the school was threatened with being shut down and merged into a new, larger school, but it was later decided that this will not be done. The Media and Communication study program at the school was one of the most popular in the county. Data from 2011 show that the school holds 275 girls and only 179 boys.

== Location ==
The school is one of three upper secondary schools in the inner-city of Bergen, situated about 100 meters from the Bergen Railway Station. It is recognized by the characteristic façade covered in ivy.

== School revue ==
Every year, a revue was arranged in the name of the pupils. Auditions were held, where only a few are picked. The revue is regarded as one of the large revues in upper secondary schools in Bergen. The revue had its own band, dancers, actors, technicians, photographers, script writers and financial managers.

== People ==
=== Alumni ===
- Herman Friele, politician
- Arne Skauge, politician
- Svein Alsaker, politician
- Audun Lysbakken, politician
- Sissel Kyrkjebø, singer

=== Staff ===
- Nils Handal, politician
- Ivar Navelsaker, military officer
