= Nils Handal =

Norwegian politician (1906–1992)

County Governor of Oppland
- In office 1961–1976
- Monarch: Olav V
- Prime Minister: Einar Gerhardsen; John Lyng; Per Borten; Trygve Bratteli; Lars Korvald; Odvar Nordli
- Preceded by: Hans Gabrielsen
- Succeeded by: Thorstein Treholt

Minister of Defence
- In office 22 January 1955 – 18 February 1961
- Prime Minister: Einar Gerhardsen
- Preceded by: Kai Knudsen
- Succeeded by: Gudmund Harlem

Minister of Industry
- In office 2 November 1953 – 22 January 1955
- Prime Minister: Oscar Torp
- Preceded by: Lars Evensen
- Succeeded by: Gustav Sjaastad

Mayor of Bergen
- In office 1 January 1946 – 31 October 1953
- Deputy: Jacob Askeland; Johs. J. Teigland; Knut Tjønneland
- Preceded by: Asbjørn Stensaker
- Succeeded by: Knut Tjønneland

Personal details
- Born: Nils Kristoffer Handal; 18 June 1906 Bergen, Hordaland, Norway
- Died: 28 December 1992 (aged 86) Oslo, Norway
- Party: Labour

Nils Kristoffer Handal (18 June 1906 – 28 December 1992) was a Norwegian politician for the Labour Party.

== Career ==
He was born in Bergen as a son of custodian Ole Monsen Handal (1876–1963) and Martha Malene Sjursen (1875–1965). He enrolled as a student in 1926 and graduated as candidatus philologiæ in 1932. He worked as a substitute teacher at a school in Bergen from 1933 to 1934, then as teacher at Bergen Handelsgymnasium from 1935 to 1961.

Handal became involved in local politics, and was Mayor of Bergen from 1945 to 1953. He was Norwegian Minister of Industry from 2 November 1953 to 22 January 1955 during Torp's Cabinet, and then Minister of Defence until 18 February 1961 during Gerhardsen's Third Cabinet. His career in politics ended with the post of County Governor of Oppland, which he held from 1961 to 1976.

Handal became a member of the board of the Union of Norwegian Cities in 1946, and was a board member of Kommunale Kinomatografers Landsforbund from 1947 to 1954 and Kommunenes Filmcentral from 1947 to 1954. He was also a board member of Årdal og Sunndal Verk from 1947 to 1956, Det Norske Luftfartsselskap from 1949 to 1962 and Norges Statsbaner from 1951 to 1968. When he moved to Oppland, he became a board member of Opplandskraft in 1964, served as vice chair from 1976 and then chair from 1980. He headed Ridderrennet from 1962, and was involved in Beitostølen Helsesportsenter. He sat on the supervisory board of Aulestad from 1964 to 1976, and as a board member of De Sandvigske Samlinger. He was also a board member of Norsk institutt for sykehusforskning from 1970 to 1976.

Handal was decorated as a Grand Knight of the Order of the Falcon in 1948 and Commander of the Royal Norwegian Order of St. Olav in 1981. He died in December 1992.

Political offices
Preceded by Asbjørn Stensaker	Mayor of Bergen; 1945–1953	Succeeded by Knut Tjønneland
Preceded by Lars Evensen	Norwegian Minister of Industry; 1953–1955	Succeeded by Gustav Sjaastad
Preceded by Kai Knudsen	Norwegian Minister of Defence; 1955–1961	Succeeded by Gudmund Harlem
Preceded by Hans Gabrielsen	County Governor of Oppland; 1961–1976	Succeeded by Thorstein Treholt
