= Paul Ernst Wilhelm Hartmann =

Norwegian politician

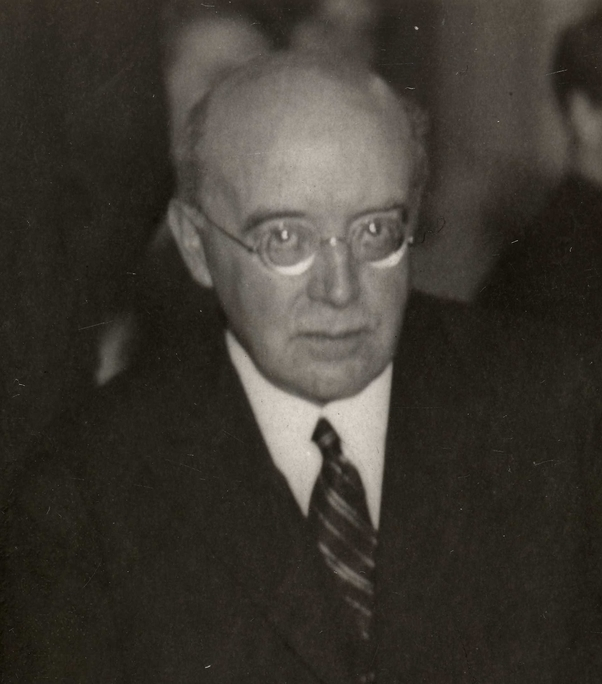
- Paul Hartmann between 1935 and 1940
- Born: 12 October 1878; Kongsberg, Norway
- Died: 5 December 1974 (aged 96)
- Occupation: Politician
- Relatives: Carl Wilhelm Hartmann (brother)

Paul Ernst Wilhelm Hartmann (12 October 1878 – 5 December 1974) was a Norwegian politician who served in the exile government of Johan Nygaardsvold during World War II. He was appointed councilor of state in 1941 and 1942, acting Minister of Finance 1941–1942 and 1942–1945, and member of the government delegation in Oslo in 1945, as head of the Ministry of Agriculture. After the war, he served as chairman of the board of Vinmonopolet (The Wine Monopoly) from 1945–53. In 1955, Hartmann published his memoires, titled Bak fronten; fra Oslo og London 1939–45 (Behind the Front, from Oslo and London 1939–45).

He was a brother of judge and politician Carl Wilhelm Hartmann.
