= Lise Skjåk Bræk =

Norwegian textile artist

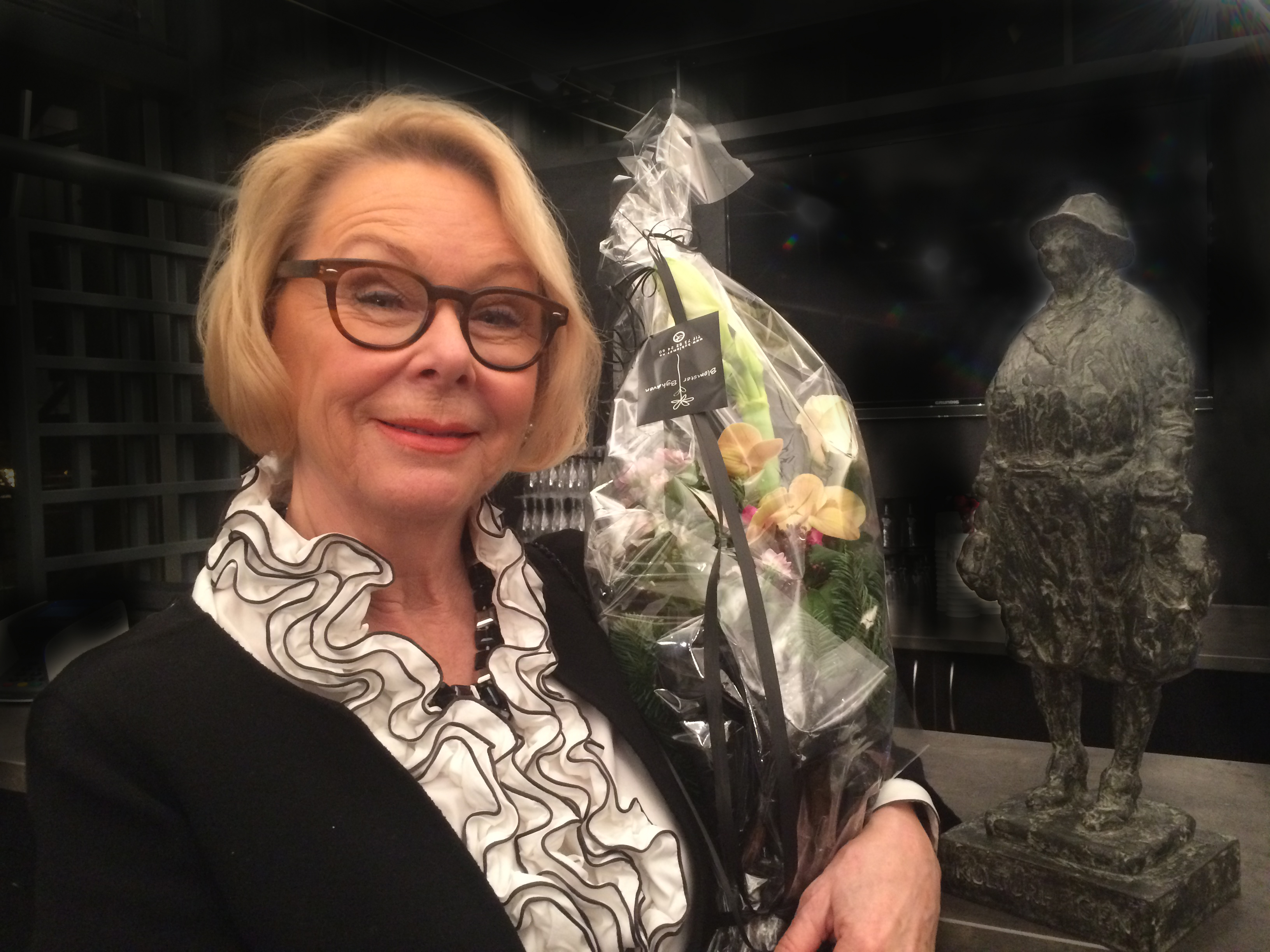

Lise Skjåk Bræk (born Marie Elisabeth Bræk, 7 November 1941) is a Norwegian textile artist, known for her works within ceremonial apparel, uniforms, costumes, rugs, and other textiles. She is a resident of Trondheim.

She is the daughter of former minister of industry in Norway, Ola Skjåk Bræk, and Ingeborg Bræk, a noted activist for humanitarian causes.
