= Ola Skjåk Bræk =

Norwegian banker and politician

Minister of Industry
- In office 18 October 1972 – 16 October 1973
- Prime Minister: Lars Korvald
- Preceded by: Finn Lied
- Succeeded by: Ingvald Ulveseth

Personal details
- Born: 4 February 1912 Eidsvoll, Norway
- Died: 26 December 1999 (aged 87) Trondheim, Norway
- Citizenship: Norwegian
- Party: Liberal Party (Norway)
- Spouse: Ebba Ingeborg ("Ingeborg") née Wergeland
- Children: Lise Skjåk Bræk, Gudmund Bræk, Leif Bræk
- Parent(s): Gudbrand Olsen Bræk, Elisabeth Hansdatter née Fischer
- Education: Candidate of Law
- Alma mater: University of Oslo
- Occupation: Banker
- Known for: Banking, politics

Ola Skjåk Bræk (4 February 1912 in Eidsvoll – 26 December 1999 in Trondheim) was a Norwegian banker and politician for the Liberal Party. He was Minister of Industry in 1972–1973.

Skjåk Bræk was born in Eidsvoll, the second child of the local banker Gudbrand Bræk and his wife Elisabeth Fischer. Gudbrand Bræk managed Eidsvoll Sparebank, the local savings bank, and was also a co-founder of Bøndernes Bank. Ola studied law at the University of Oslo and earned his cand.jur. degree in 1935. He married Ingeborg Wergeland, a noted peace activist. Among their children is Lise Skjåk Bræk, a fashion and costume designer. Ola Skjåk Bræk moved to Ålesund in 1950 to assume the presidency of Aalesund Nye Kreditbank, a savings and loan bank for the coastal region which eventually became merged into Sunnmørsbanken. He worked in this area - with leave for his time in the cabinet - until 1979, when he retired and moved to Trondheim.

He served in the position of deputy representative to the Norwegian Parliament from Møre og Romsdal during the terms 1965–1969 and 1973–1977. He became Minister of Industry in the coalition cabinet formed by Lars Korvald after Trygve Bratteli resigned his cabinet after a referendum defeated his proposal for Norway to join the European Union. Skjåk Bræk ended up on the anti-EEC side, and as such stayed in the Liberal Party after the party split in 1972. He played an active role in the post-World War II economic development in Western Norway and took political and professional interest in the appropriate use of Norway's natural resources.

Ola Skjåk Bræk published his memoirs Hva brast så høyt? (ISBN 82-90330-50-2) in 1990, expressing several concerns about Norwegian economic policy.

Government offices
Preceded by Finn Lied	Norwegian Minister of Industry; 1972–1973	Succeeded by Ingvald Ulveseth
