= Ministry of Trade and Shipping =

Former government ministry of Norway

The Royal Norwegian Ministry of Trade and Shipping (Norwegian: Handels- og skipsfartsdepartementet) was a Norwegian ministry that existed from 1947 to 1987.

It was established on 6 December 1947. It ceased to exist on 31 December 1987. Its tasks were mainly transferred to the Ministry of Foreign Affairs.

For the heads of the Ministry of Trade and Shipping, see the list of ministers of trade and shipping.

An unrelated Ministry of Shipping had existed from 1942 to 1945.
