= Erik Brofoss =

Norwegian sprinter and politician

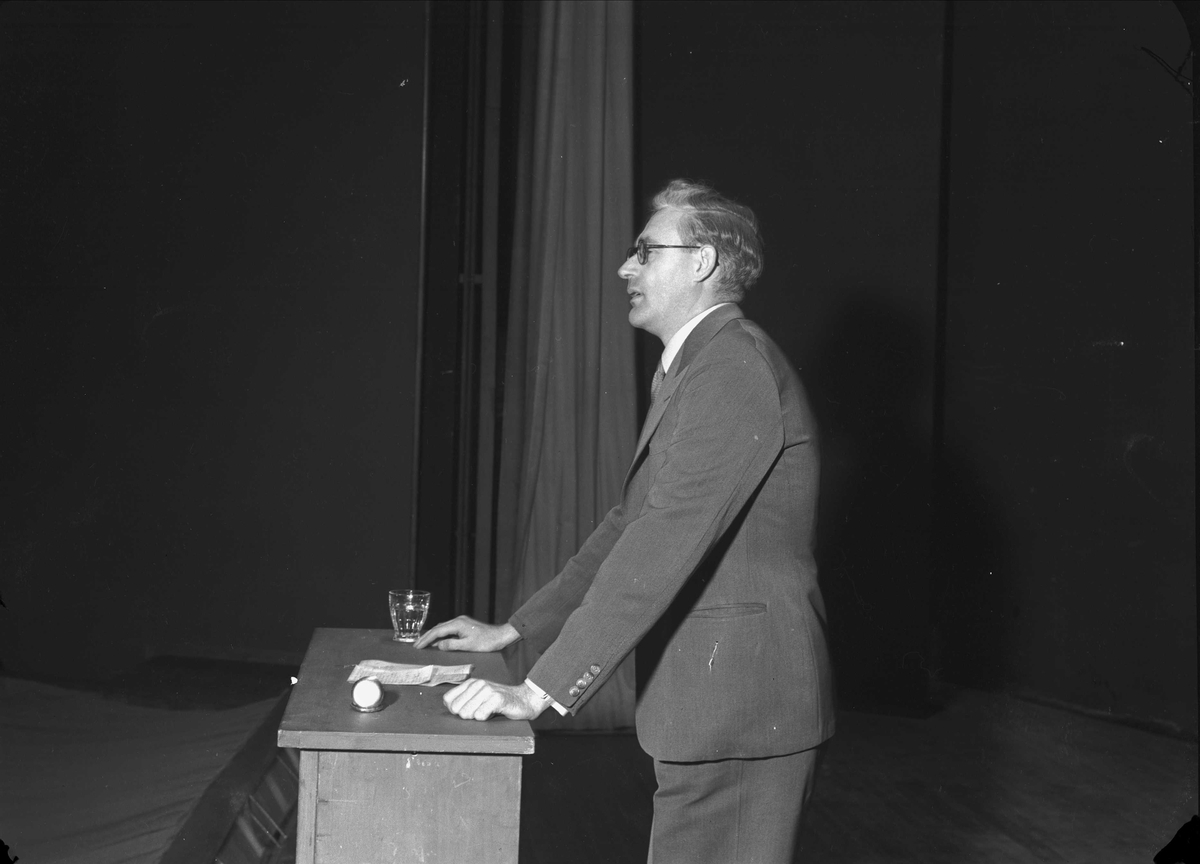
- Brofoss in 1946.

Governor of the Central Bank of Norway
- In office 1954–1970
- Preceded by: Gunnar Jahn
- Succeeded by: Knut Getz Wold

Minister of Trade and Shipping
- In office 6 December 1947 – 2 June 1954
- Prime Minister: Einar Gerhardsen; Oscar Torp
- Preceded by: Arne T. Sunde (1945)
- Succeeded by: Nils Langhelle

Minister of Finance
- In office 5 November 1945 – 6 December 1947
- Prime Minister: Einar Gerhardsen
- Preceded by: Gunnar Jahn
- Succeeded by: Olav Meisdalshagen

Personal details
- Born: 21 June 1908 Kongsberg, Norway
- Died: 7 May 1979 (aged 70) Oslo, Norway
- Party: Labour
- Spouse: Kirsten Marie Enlien (m. 1938)
- Children: Knut Brofoss
- Occupation: Politician; Economist; Jurist

Erik Brofoss (21 June 1908 – 7 May 1979) was a Norwegian economist and politician for the Labour Party.

Brofoss was born in Kongsberg. In his younger days he was an athlete who competed national level in the 100 metres. He represented Kongsberg IF, and won a silver medal at the Norwegian championships in 1928. His career best time in 100 m was 10.8 seconds, achieved in August 1931 in Kongsberg. He had 6.96 metres in the long jump, achieved in July 1928 at Bislett stadion.

He became Minister of Finance in 1945 and stayed in this position until 1947. He then helped found the Ministry of Trade and Shipping and headed it from 1947 to 1954. He was later a director of the Executive Board of the International Monetary Fund from 1970 to 1973.

Political offices
Preceded by position created	Norwegian Minister of Trade and Shipping; 1947–1954	Succeeded by Oscar Torp
Preceded by Gunnar Jahn	Norwegian Minister of Finance; 1945–1947	Succeeded by Olav Meisdalshagen
Government offices
Preceded by Gunnar Jahn	Central Bank Governor of Norway; 1954–1970	Succeeded by Knut Getz Wold
