= Nils Langhelle =

Norwegian politician

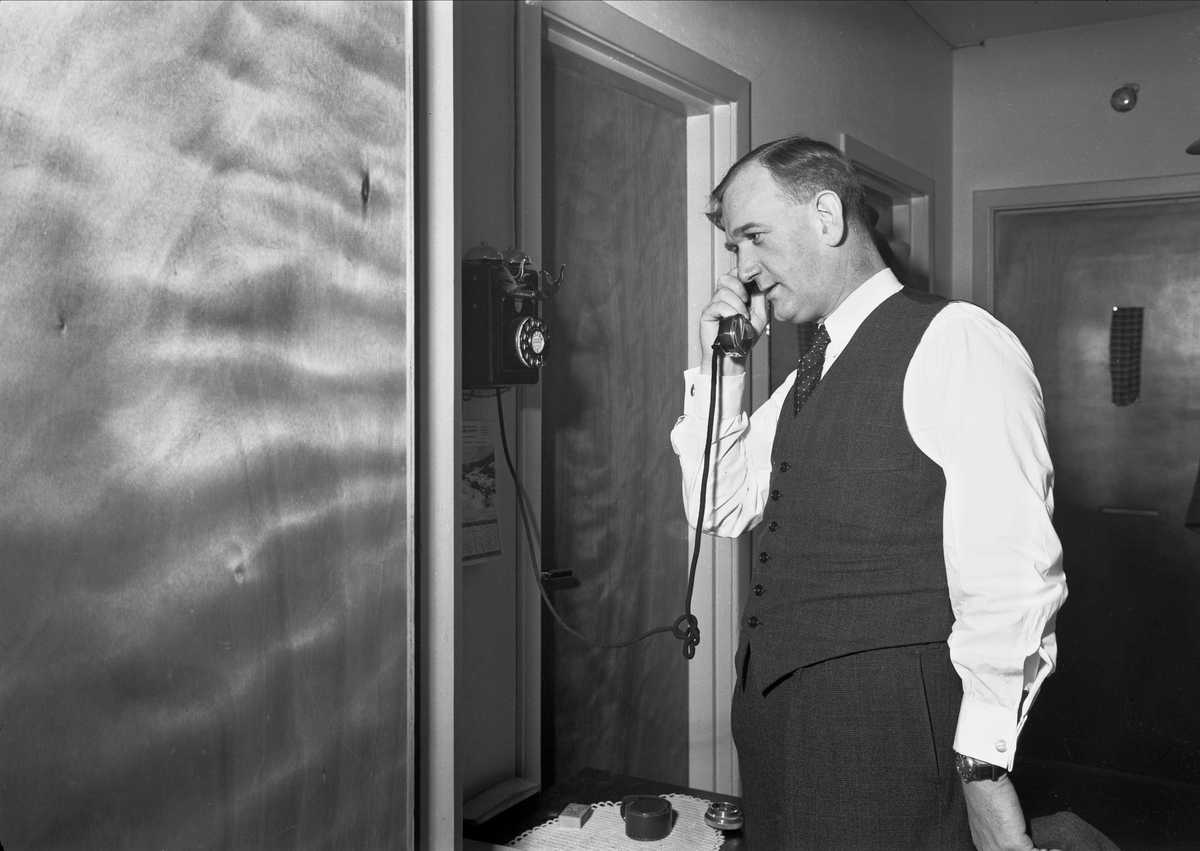
- Langhelle in 1947.

President of the Storting
- In office 8 May 1958 – 30 September 1965
- Prime Minister: Einar Gerhardsen; John Lyng
- Vice President: Nils Hønsvald; Alv Kjøs
- Preceded by: Oscar Torp
- Succeeded by: Bernt Ingvaldsen

Vice President of the Storting
- In office 8 October 1965 – 28 August 1967
- President: Bernt Ingvaldsen
- Preceded by: Alv Kjøs
- Succeeded by: Leif Granli
- In office 11 January 1957 – 8 May 1958
- President: Oscar Torp
- Preceded by: Johan Wiik
- Succeeded by: Nils Hønsvald

Minister of Trade and Shipping
- In office 15 June 1954 – 22 January 1955
- Prime Minister: Oscar Torp
- Preceded by: Oscar Torp (acting)
- Succeeded by: Arne Skaug

Minister of Defence
- In office 5 January 1952 – 14 June 1954
- Prime Minister: Oscar Torp
- Preceded by: Jens Christian Hauge
- Succeeded by: Kai Birger Knudsen

Minister of Transport and Communications
- In office 22 February 1946 – 5 January 1952
- Prime Minister: Einar Gerhardsen; Oscar Torp
- Preceded by: Position established
- Succeeded by: Jakob Martin Pettersen

Minister of Labour
- In office 5 November 1945 – 22 February 1946
- Prime Minister: Einar Gerhardsen
- Preceded by: Johan S. Johansen
- Succeeded by: Position abolished

Personal details
- Born: 28 September 1907 Bergen, Hordaland, Norway
- Died: 28 August 1967 (aged 59) Hol, Buskerud, Norway
- Party: Labour
- Spouse: Esther Engelsen

Nils Langhelle (28 September 1907 – 28 August 1967) was a Norwegian politician for the Labour Party and Minister of Labour 1945–1946, Norway's first Minister of Transport and Communications 1946-1951 and 1951–1952, Minister of Defense 1952–1954, Minister of Trade and Shipping 1954-1955 and President of the Storting from 7 May 1958 to 30 September 1965.

He was arrested on 29 January 1943 and imprisoned in Grini concentration camp from May to December 1943, then in Sachsenhausen concentration camp until the end of World War II.

Political offices
Preceded by Johan Strand Johansen	Minister of Labour; 1945–1946	Succeeded by none
Preceded by none	Minister of Transport and Communications; 1946–1952	Succeeded by Jakob Martin Pettersen
Preceded by Jens Chr. Hauge	Minister of Defence; 1952–1954	Succeeded by Kai Birger Knudsen
Preceded by Oscar Torp	Minister of Trade and Shipping; 1954–1955	Succeeded by Arne Skaug
Preceded by Oscar Torp	President of the Storting; 1958–1965	Succeeded by Bernt Ingvaldsen
Cultural offices
Preceded by Henning Bødtker	Chairman of Foreningen Norden in Norway; 1956–1959	Succeeded by Henrik Groth
