= Liberal Students of Norway =

Liberal Students of Norway Norges Liberale Studentforbund
- Chairperson: Jens Kristian Øvstebø
- Founded: 27 November 1908
- Headquarters: Oslo
- Ideology: Social liberalism Green liberalism
- Mother party: Venstre
- International affiliation: International Federation of Liberal & Radical Youth (IFLRY)
- European affiliation: European Liberal Youth (LYMEC)
- Website: liberalestudenter.no

The Liberal Students of Norway (Norwegian: Norges Liberale Studentforbund, often: NLSF and Liberale Studenter) is the political student organization of the Norwegian Liberal Party (Venstre), with chapters in the major university cities of Oslo, Bergen, Trondheim and Ås. It was founded in 1908, making it one of Norway's oldest student organizations.

The organization's name has changed several times. Originally named Social-radikale studenterforening (1908–1911), it has used other names such as Studentenes Venstreforening (1911–1924), Studentenes Venstrelag and Studentvenstrelaget.

NLSF used to publish the magazines Epoke (1947 – ?) and then Liberalt Perspektiv.

== History ==
There has previously been Den frisinnede studenterforening which is already mentioned in 1880. A delegation from Studentenes Venstreforening is also mentioned to have participated in a conference in Uppsala in 1901.

The current organization was founded in 1908 under the name Social-radikale studenterforening. The student society of Oslo was then led by the conservative C. J. Hambro and refused to pass a resolution condemning students who were breaking a strike among harbor workers. A committee led by Wilhelm Keilhau sought to gather all the "academical citizens who want radical policies in social matters". Ole Solnørdal was elected president under the constitutive assembly on 27 November 1908.

Studentenes Venstrelag contributed to the revival of Unge Venstre, Venstre's youth wing from 1920 to 1926. It functioned in 1936 as an affiliate of both the youth and mother organization.

The Trondheim chapter is founded in 1946-1947. The Bergen chapter is founded during the first half of the 1950s, it temporarily dissolved in 1970-1971 and transformed into the unaffiliated Populistiske Arbeidsgrupper.

== Chairpersons ==
Name	Years	Name	Years	Name	Years
Ole Solnørdal	1908 – 1909	Wilhelm Keilhau	1911	Toralv Øksnevad	1912
Gudbrand Østbye	1913	Magne Schjødt	1913	Arne Aas	1914
Torkell Løvland	1914	Ivar Moen	1914	Wilhelm Thagaard	1915
Finn Schjødt	1916	Conrad Falsen	1916	Nils Jøntvedt	1917
Ivar Rummelhoff	1917	Ragnar Kringlebotten	1918	Trygve Laake	1919
Ivar Myklebust	1919	Håkon Evjenth		Christian Stray	
Einar Korsvig-Rasmussen		Knut Anonsen	1924	Leif Røslie	1925
Anton Laurin (nn)	1926–1927	Peder Scheie	1927	Christian Oftedal	1928
Ragnar Vold	1928–1929	Carl Bundi	1930	Berge Øverland	1930
Christian A. R. Christensen	1931	Olav Børge-Ask	1932	Øyvind Hardeng	1933–1934
Trygve Jakobsen	1934–1935	Knut Getz Wold	1935	Hjørdis Tveterås	1936
Finn Jørgensen	1936	Rolf E. Rasmussen	1937	Aasmund Espeland	1937–1938
Steinar Skaar	1938	Helge Seip	1939–1945	Helge Rognlien	1946
Kristen Nygaard	1946–1947	Enevald Skadsem	1947	Odd Jakobsen	1948
John Lager	1948	Bjørn Dalan	1949	Knut Aspeland	1949
Per Torsvik	1950	Johan Kleppe	1950	Terje Herrem	1951
Gunnar Helge Carlsen	1951	Magne Leirheim	1952	Håkon Knudsen*	1952
Arne Eggesvik	1953	Lars Vilhelm Gjemdal**	1953	Olav Stokke	1954
Olav Myklebust	1954	Georg Stang	1955	Torstein Slungård	1955–1956
Torleiv Lid	1956	Sigurd Skirbekk	1957	Odd Rødseth	1957
Ørm Øverland	1958	Håvard Alstadheim	1958		
Halle Jørn Hanssen	1961–1962	Jostein Nerbøvik	1962–1964	Arne Bjørlykke	1964–1965
Kari Skrede	1965–1966	Arne Finborud	1966–1967	Olav Garvik	1967–1968
John M. Nygård	1969–1970	Jørund Soma	1970–?		

* Mari Evenrud and Magne Leirheim assumed the interim chairmanship due to Knudsen's disease

** Håkon Nygaard assumed the interim chairmanship during Gjemdal's military service

- Torgeir Anda ?–1979
- Anita Haugland ca. 1987
- Grete Line Simonsen 1991–?
- Morten Hagen 1995–1996
- Per Aage Pleym Christensen 1996–?

Name	Years	Name	Years	Name	Years
Trond Wathne Tveiten	2002–2003	Trond Enger	2003	Knud Berthelsen	2003–2005
Kjartan Almenning	2005–2009	Erling Gilhus Hillestad	2009–2010	Erik Nyman-Apelset	2010–2012
Daniel Heggelid-Rugaas	2012–2013	Erlend Kristoffer Schjelderup	2013–2013	Simen Eriksen	2014–2016
Marcus Pettersen Irgens	2016	Linn Skyum	2016–2017	Øyvind Dammerud	2017–2018
Amanda Haugnes Rygg	2018–2020	Jens Kristian Øvstebø	2020–		
