= Helge Sivertsen =

Norwegian discus thrower and politician

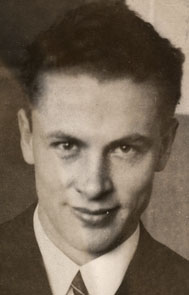
- Sivertsen in ca. 1935

Minister of Education and Church Affairs
- In office 25 September 1963 – 12 October 1965
- Prime Minister: Einar Gerhardsen
- Preceded by: Olaf Kortner
- Succeeded by: Kjell Bondevik
- In office 23 April 1960 – 28 August 1963
- Prime Minister: Einar Gerhardsen
- Preceded by: Birger Bergersen
- Succeeded by: Olaf Kortner

State Secretary for the Ministry of Education and Church Affairs
- In office 11 July 1947 – 5 October 1956
- Prime Minister: Einar Gerhardsen; Oscar Torp
- Minister: Kaare Fostervoll; Lars Moen; Birger Bergersen

Personal details
- Born: 12 June 1913 Mandal, Norway
- Died: 21 December 1986 (aged 73) Oslo, Norway
- Party: Labour
- Spouse: Merle Five (m. 1940)
- Sports career
- Height: 183 cm (6 ft 0 in)
- Weight: 87 kg (192 lb)
- Sport: Athletics
- Event: Discus throw
- Club: University of Oxford AC; Achilles Club; Studentenes Idrettslag

Helge Sivertsen (12 June 1913 – 21 December 1986) was a Norwegian school administrator and elected official. He was best known as a champion discus thrower in the 1936 Summer Olympics.

== Biography ==
He was born at Mandal in Vest-Agder, Norway. He was the son of Nils Sivertsen (1877-1955) and Martha Heddeland (1883-1962).

His father was a college teacher, and the family moved to Inderøy Municipality in 1926.

He attended folk school (Orkdal Landslymnas) and took artium in 1933. Sivertsen was a historian by education. He studied at the University of Oslo and became cand.philol. in 1940 with a history major. From 1938 to 1939, he studied history, politics and international relations at University of Oxford under a Norwegian Oxford Scholarship.

He represented Inderøy IL in athletics competitions. He became Norwegian champion in discus throw in 1934 and 1935. At the 1936 Summer Olympics in Berlin, he finished tenth in the discus final with a throw of 45.89 metres. His personal best throw was 47.72 metres, achieved in July 1936 at Bislett stadion in Oslo.

During the occupation of Norway by Nazi Germany (1940-1945), he was a member of Milorg. Sivertsen led the center's information service. After the liberation of Norway in 1945, he became secretary of the Military Investigation Commission of 1945 and wrote the history of Milorg activities during the war years.

His party affiliation was to the Labour Party. Sivertsen pursued a career in politics, and was secretary to the Prime Minister Einar Gerhardsen in 1947, state secretary to the Minister of Education and Church Affairs from 1947 to 1956, and Minister of Education and Church Affairs from 1960 to 1965 in the third and fourth cabinet Gerhardsen, only interrupted by the short-lived cabinet of Prime Minister John Lyng in 1963.

He was director of education in Oslo, Akershus and Østfold from 1956 to 1960, in Oslo and Akershus from 1966 to 1970 and in Oslo from 1971. He served as a member of the Board of the United States Educational Foundation in Norway from 1949 to 1956. He was chairman of the Teacher Education Council 1957-1960 and of the State Scholarship Council 1955–1960. He retired in 1981.

== Personal life ==
He was married in 1940 with Merle Five (1914–2003), daughter of Håkon Five (1880–1944) who served as a Member of Parliament from Nord-Trøndelag.

Political offices
Preceded by Birger Bergersen	Minister of Education and Church Affairs; 1960–1963	Succeeded by Olaf Kortner
Preceded by Olaf Kortner	Minister of Education and Church Affairs; 1963–1965	Succeeded by Kjell Bondevik
Awards
Preceded by Sigmund Skard	Recipient of the Norsk kulturråds ærespris 1984	Succeeded by Lars Brandstrup
