= Per Tore Woie =

Norwegian politician (1969–2019)

State Secretary in the Office of the Prime Minister
- In office 1997-2000
- Prime Minister: Kjell Magne Bondevik

Personal details
- Born: 26 April 1969
- Died: 19 November 2019 (aged 50)
- Party: Liberal Party

Per Tore Woie (26 April 1969 – 19 November 2019) was a Norwegian politician for the Liberal Party.

From 1992 to 1994 he was the leader of the Young Liberals of Norway, the youth wing of the Liberal Party.

He served as a State Secretary in the Office of the Prime Minister from 1997 to 2000, during the reign of Bondevik's First Cabinet. He has also worked as an adviser for the Liberal parliamentary caucus.

Party political offices
Preceded by Gunn-Vivian Eide	Leader of Young Liberals of Norway; 1992–1994	Succeeded by Helge Solum Larsen
