= Stefi Koht Krogh =

Norwegian athlete (1932–2019)

Stefi Koht Krogh (8 April 1938 – 18 September 2014) was a Norwegian discus thrower and practitioner of alternative treatment.

== Athletic career ==
In the mid-1950s, she participated in the multi-events, winning four bronze medals at the Norwegian Championships in 1956 and 1958: two in the triathlon event—100 metres, discus throw and high jump—as well as two in the high jump.

Discus throw became Koht's main event. Despite Edel Leverås holding the Norwegian record from 1958 to 1968, Koht managed to win two Norwegian Championships during this period. Koht first took bronze in 1958, followed by gold in 1959 and silver in 1960. Her best result then came at the 1961 Norwegian Championships, where she managed to beat Edel Leverås head-to-head with 40.98 versus 40.26 metres. Having married, Koht Krogh took two additional silver medals in 1963 and 1964. She also won bronze in the shot put at 1958 Norwegian Championships. She represented the club Kongsvinger IL. Koht Krogh was also involved in coaching locally.

== Professional career ==
Her initial education was at the State School of Gymnastics with a visiting semester at the German Sport University Cologne. She worked as a physical education teacher at Sentrum Upper Secondary School in Kongsvinger. In the 1970s, Koht Krogh studied alternative therapies in Stockholm. In 1979 she finished a four-year course in natural medicine, being called a nature therapist or "homiatrician" as a practitioner. Having graduated from the Yoga Light Center in Stockholm, she proposed for yoga to be more widespread in schools. She claimed that the state of public health in Norway was "abysmal", and wanted far more emphasis on Eastern medicine.

Koht Krogh was used as a therapist by the football team Kongsvinger IL, employing acupuncture, vegetarian and biodynamic diets, as well as an "electrical massage bench" in her clinic in downtown Kongsvinger. She made her diagnoses in part from analyses of the iris. In proposing tree hugging, Koht Krogh drew on experiences with qi gong. Koht Krogh stated that the "vibrations" of the birch had a diuretic effect and cleansed the blood, that the most heavy vibrations were found in the oak and could help with rheumatism and inflammation, and that the spruce was better for "people who stress a lot and mostly use the left brain hemisphere, the logic".

She also petitioned politicians to introduce more physical education in schools. Locally, she and her husband also spearheaded a campaign against a golf course, and she tried to protest the expansion of Kongsvinger Prison with a new branch at Vardåsen.

== Personal life ==
She was married to journalist Lars Jacob Krogh. Except for 12 years in Oslo until 1974, they resided in Kongsvinger, whereupon her husband commuted to Oslo the rest of his career to work in television. She died in September 2014, surviving her husband by four years.

One of their daughters married a Luxembourger man; their son Lars Krogh Gerson became a professional footballer who represented the national team of Luxembourg.
