= Ola H. Metliaas =

Norwegian politician (1943–2005)

Ola H. Metliaas (30 January 1943 – 5 April 2005) was a Norwegian civil servant and politician.

He was born in Orkdal Municipality, and had a background as chairman of the Young Liberals of Norway, the young wing of the Liberal Party, from 1966 to 1968. In 1972 he was the managing director of Ja til EF, an organization supporting Norwegian membership in the European Community. The issue was up for referendum in 1972, but the referendum failed, and Metliaas joined the Liberal People's Party which split from the Liberal Party due to this issue.

Metliaas was later director of Statens Attføringsinstitutt from 1979 to 1983, in the Norwegian Directorate of Labour from 1983 to 1988, of Ullevål University Hospital from 1989 to 1996, of the Norwegian Refugee Council from 1997 to 1999 and of Elverum Hospital from 1999 to his death.

Party political offices
Preceded by Halle Jørn Hanssen	Chairman of the Young Liberals of Norway; 1966–1968	Succeeded by Kjell G. Rosland
