= Olaf Kortner =

Norwegian politician

Minister of Education and Church Affairs
- In office 28 August 1963 – 25 September 1963
- Prime Minister: John Lyng
- Preceded by: Helge Sivertsen
- Succeeded by: Helge Sivertsen

Deputy Member of the Norwegian Parliament
- In office 1 October 1965 – 30 September 1973; Permanent representative for Helge Seip (12 October 1965 – 29 August 1970)
- Constituency: Oslo

Leader of the Young Liberals
- In office 1948–1950
- Preceded by: Helge Rognlien
- Succeeded by: Jon Ola Norbom

Personal details
- Born: Olaf Erling Kortner; 10 May 1920 Skien, Telemark, Norway
- Died: 26 January 1998 (aged 77) Oslo, Norway
- Party: Liberal

Olaf Erling Kortner (10 May 1920 – 26 January 1998) was a Norwegian politician for the Liberal Party.

He was born in Skien.

From 1948 to 1950 he was the leader of the Young Liberals of Norway, the youth wing of the Liberal Party.

He was a member of the municipal council for Strinda Municipality in the period 1951–1955. From August to September 1963 he served as the Minister of Education and Church Affairs during the short-lived centre-right cabinet of John Lyng.

He served in the position of deputy representative to the Norwegian Parliament from Oslo during the terms 1965–1969 and 1969–1973. During parts of these terms, from 1965 to 1970, he met as a regular representative for Helge Seip while he was appointed to the cabinet Borten.

A cand.philol. by education (1948), he worked as a teacher in Strinda and Oslo from 1950 to 1970. From 1971 to 1990 he headed the school administration in Akershus.

Party political offices
Preceded by Helge Rognlien	Chairman of the Young Liberals of Norway; 1948–1950	Succeeded by Jon Ola Norbom
Political offices
Preceded by Helge Sivertsen	Minister of Education and Church Affairs (Norway); August 1963–September 1963	Succeeded by Helge Sivertsen
