= Slungård =

Slungård is a Norwegian surname. Notable people with the surname include:

- Anne Kathrine Slungård (born 1964), Norwegian politician
- Torstein Slungård (1931–2009), Norwegian politician
