= Torsvik =

Torsvik is a Norwegian surname. Notable people with the surname include:

- Chand Torsvik (born 1982), Norwegian singer
- Jonas Torsvik (born 2005), Norwegian footballer
- Per Torsvik (1925–1998), Norwegian political scientist and media scholar
- Solveig Torsvik (born 1954), Norwegian politician
- Trond Helge Torsvik (born 1957), Norwegian professor of geophysics
