= Simen Skjønsberg =

Norwegian journalist and writer

Simen Skjønsberg (2 September 1920 – 26 December 1993) was a Norwegian journalist and writer.

He was born in Øyer Municipality in Oppland county, Norway. During the occupation of Norway by Nazi Germany he was arrested by the Nazi authorities following the 1943 University of Oslo fire. After being initially imprisoned in Stavern he was shipped to German camps, where he was incarcerated in Sennheim and Buchenwald until the liberation. He finally graduated as cand.mag. in 1950. He was hired as a journalist in Dagbladet in 1954, and was its cultural editor from 1959 to 1978. He was succeeded by Hans Fredrik Dahl.

He published several novels, including Der bommene senkes (1971), Fuglebrettet (1973), Gitter i lyset (1975) and Ingen friplass på karusellen (1977). He also wrote poetry, his collections including Vi er blitt fremmede (1965), Dag for reisende (1967), Dikt. Norwegian-German (translated and edited by Hans Däumling, 1969), Flyttedag (1969), I realismesalen (1984) and Grensevakter (1987). He was awarded the Mads Wiel Nygaards Endowment in 1970 and the Gyldendal's Endowment in 1984.

Party political offices
Preceded by Jon Ola Norbom	Chairman of the Young Liberals of Norway; 1952–1956	Succeeded by Odd Grande
