= Kortner =

Kortner is a surname. Notable people with the surname include:

- Fritz Kortner (1892–1970), Austrian stage and film actor and theatre director
- Olaf Kortner (1920–1998), Norwegian politician
