= Olav Myklebust =

Olav Myklebust (17 January 1932 – 1 November 2011) was a Norwegian civil servant, diplomat and politician for the Liberal Party.

He hailed from Sunnmøre and took the cand.psychol. degree in 1957. He worked in NAVF and the Norwegian Computing Center. From 1962 to 1964 he was the leader of the Young Liberals, the youth wing of the Liberal Party; and from 1964 to 1968 he was the secretary-general of the Liberal Party.

He was hired in the Norwegian Agency for Development Cooperation (Norad) in 1968, became Norad's representative in Tanzania in 1972 and advanced to head of department in 1976. In 1989 he became deputy under-secretary of state in the Ministry of Development Cooperation, continuing in the Ministry of Foreign Affairs when the two ministries were merged. Between 1992 and 1998 he was Norway's ambassador to Namibia, then Malawi. While serving in Namibia he was also posted as ambassador to Angola.

He was decorated as a Knight, First Class of the Order of St. Olav and died in November 2011.

Party political offices
Preceded by Magne Lerheim	Chairman of the Young Liberals of Norway; 1962–1964	Succeeded by Halle Jørn Hanssen
