= Birger Bergersen =

Norwegian diplomat and politician (1891–1977)

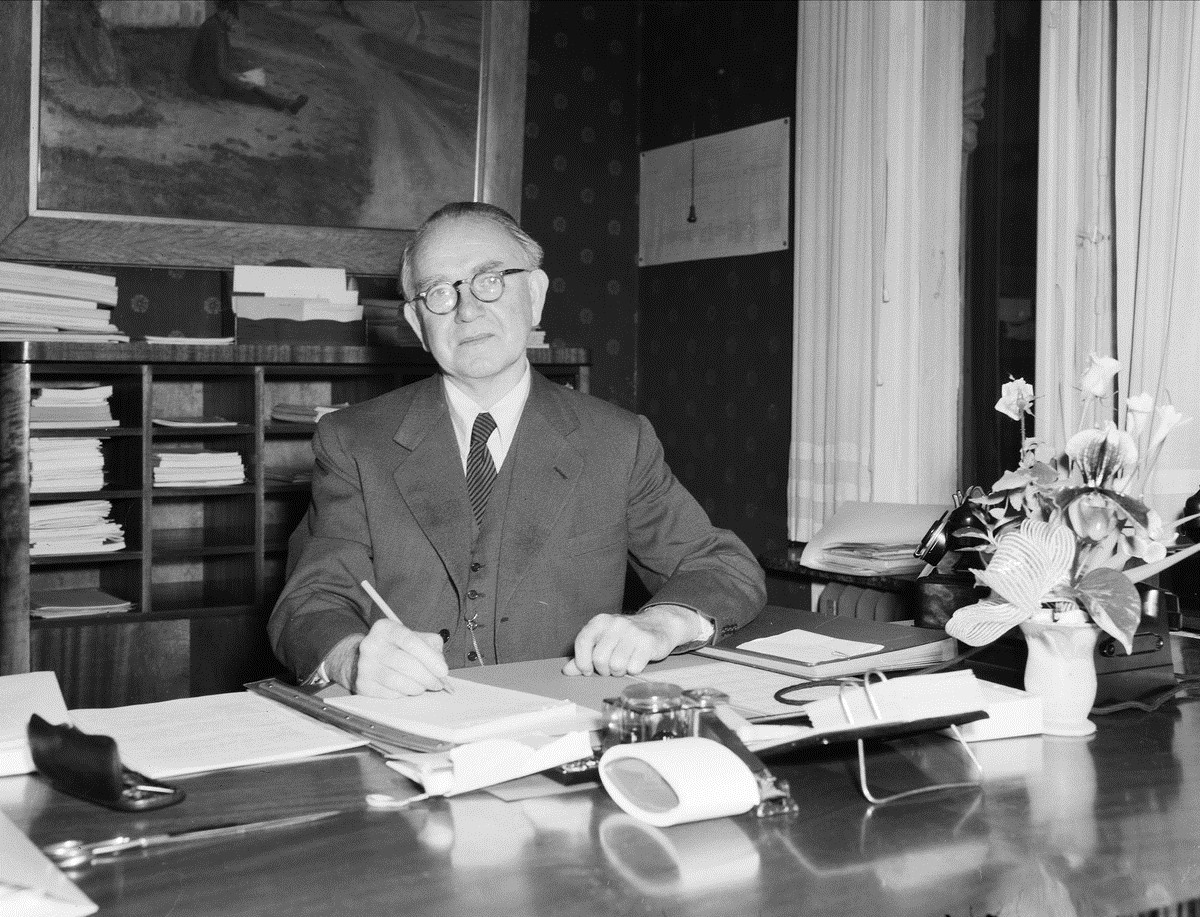
- Bergersen in December 1953.

Minister of Education and Church Affairs
- In office 9 December 1953 – 23 April 1960
- Prime Minister: Oscar Torp; Einar Gerhardsen
- Preceded by: Lars Moen
- Succeeded by: Helge Sivertsen

Norwegian Ambassador to Sweden
- In office 1 January 1946 – 8 December 1953
- Prime Minister: Einar Gerhardsen; Oscar Torp
- Preceded by: Jens Bull
- Succeeded by: Jens Schive

Personal details
- Born: Birger Martin Bergersen; 25 July 1891 Kvæfjord, Troms, Norway
- Died: 14 July 1977 (aged 85) Oslo, Norway
- Party: Labour
- Spouse: Benedicte Nicolaysen (m. 1930)

Birger Martin Bergersen (25 July 1891 – 14 July 1977) was a Norwegian anatomist and politician for the Labour Party. He notably served as a professor (1932–1947) and rector (1938–1945) of Norges tannlegehøgskole, Norway's ambassador to Sweden (1947–1953), Norwegian Minister of Education and Church Affairs (1953–1960) and chairman of the International Whaling Commission.

== Early life and education ==
He was born in Kvæfjord Municipality as a son of teacher Hans Christian Bergersen (1835–1925) and his wife Ingeborg Kristine Heitmann (1848–1938). He finished his secondary education in 1909, and was hired as a journalist in Social-Demokraten in 1910. He took a teacher's education in 1915, and after working one year as a teacher, he enrolled at the Royal Frederick University to study medicine. After two years he switched to zoology, and he graduated with the cand.real. degree in 1925. His advisor for the master's degree was Kristine Bonnevie, and his thesis was translated, shortened and issued in the German journal Zeitschrift für Zellforschung und mikroskopische Anatomie in 1926. Bergersen was a board member of the Norwegian Students' Society, and worked part-time as a curator and assistant at the university and its palaeontological museum.

== Academic and diplomatic career ==
Shortly after graduating, he was hired as a docent at Norges tannlegehøgskole. He conducted further studies, mostly at the Swedish Veterinary College, and took the dr.philos. degree in 1932 with the thesis Beiträge zur Kenntnis der Haut einiger Pinnipedien. This would be the pinnacle of his academic writings. He was appointed as a professor of anatomy at Norges tannlegehøgskole in the same year, and served as vice rector from 1933 to 1937.

In 1938 he was made rector of Norges tannlegehøgskole. In 1942 he had to flee to London because of World War II and the German occupation of Norway. In London he worked for the Norwegian Ministry of Provisioning and Reconstruction. Formally, he still held the position of rector, but only until 1945. In 1947 he left as professor as well, as he had become the Norwegian ambassador to Sweden.

Bergersen was also an activist, from the 1930s onwards, against the unsustainable hunting of whales in the Southern Ocean. This led to the creation of the International Whaling Commission, where Bergersen was the first chairman. He chaired Hvalrådet from 1936 to 1954.

He was a member of the Norwegian Academy of Science and Letters from 1936, the Royal Norwegian Society of Sciences and Letters from 1955 and the New York Academy of Sciences from 1960. He was an honorary member of the Norwegian Dental Association from 1950 and the Swedish Dental Society from 1956.

== Political career ==
Bergersen had been a member of Oslo city council from 1934 to 1940, and briefly in 1945 after the war's end. In December 1953, while still serving as ambassador, he joined the Cabinet of Oscar Torp as Minister of Education and Church Affairs. He served until April 1960, remaining in the post well into the Gerhardsen's Third Cabinet. In 1960 he was replaced with Helge Sivertsen.

Bergersen was also a board member of the Norwegian Maritime Museum from 1928 to 1967, of the Oslo municipal cinema from 1935 to 1940 and Kommunenes Filmcentral. He was a deputy board member of Norsk Film, and sat on the supervisory board of Oslo Sporveier.

Since 1930 he was married to Benedicte Nicolaysen (1897–1981). He died in July 1977 in Oslo.

== Select publications ==
- Beiträge zur Kenntnis der Haut einiger Pinnipedien, Ph.D. dissertation, 1931
- Om vern og utnyttelse av landpattedyr og fugl på Svalbard og Jan Mayen, 1938
- Liv og utvikling. Trekk fra biologiens historie, 1966
- Modningsår, 1969
- Hva USA skylder Hitler, 1973

Political offices
Preceded by Lars Magnus Moen	Norwegian Minister of Education and Church Affairs; 1953–1960	Succeeded by Helge Sivertsen
