= Odd Bye =

Norwegian politician

Odd Bye (27 February 1916 – 26 May 2010) was a Norwegian politician for the Centre Party.

Bye came from Horg Municipality in Sør-Trøndelag county. From 1945 he worked as a journalist in different newspapers including Nationen and Dagbladet Rogaland. He was also the editor-in-chief of the Centre Party's press office from 1948 to 1965. During Borten's Cabinet from 1965 to 1971 Bye held the position as State Secretary at the Office of the Prime Minister.

After the Borten cabinet resigned in 1971 Bye returned to his job as chief editor and continued in that job until he retired in 1984. Bye died on 26 May 2010, 94 years old.
