= Sveinung Rotevatn =

Norwegian politician

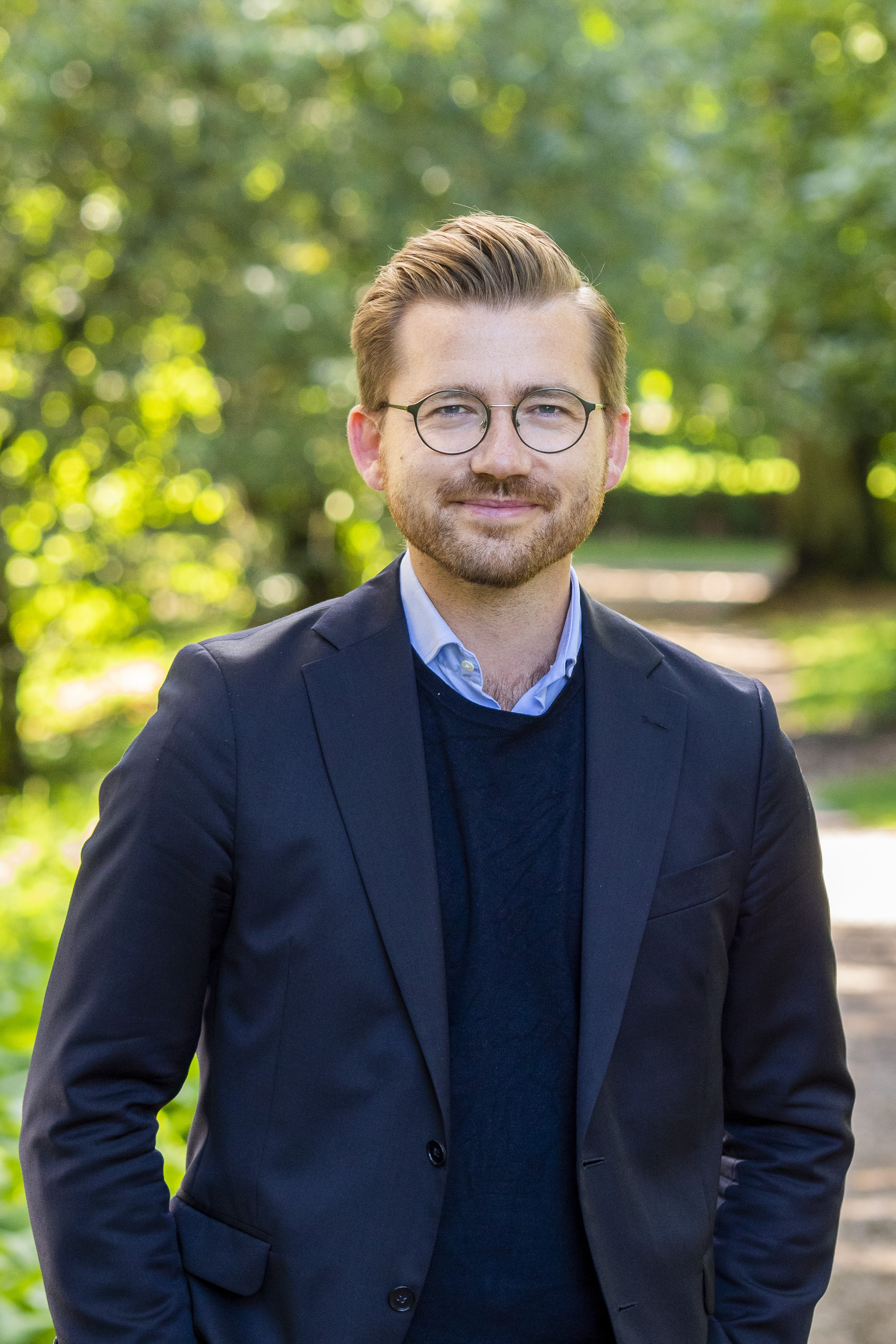
- Rotevatn in 2020

First Deputy Leader of the Liberal Party
- In office 26 September 2020 – 18 December 2025
- Leader: Guri Melby
- Preceded by: Ola Elvestuen
- Succeeded by: Ingvild Wetrhus Thorsvik

Minister of Climate and the Environment
- In office 24 January 2020 – 14 October 2021
- Prime Minister: Erna Solberg
- Preceded by: Ola Elvestuen
- Succeeded by: Espen Barth Eide

State Secretary for the Ministry of Climate and the Environment
- In office 12 October 2018 – 24 January 2020
- Prime Minister: Erna Solberg
- Minister: Ola Elvestuen

State Secretary for the Ministry of Justice and Public Security
- In office 17 January 2018 – 12 October 2018
- Prime Minister: Erna Solberg
- Minister: Sylvi Listhaug; Tor Mikkel Wara

Member of the Storting
- In office 1 October 2021 – 30 September 2025
- Deputy: Ane Breivik (2021)
- Constituency: Hordaland
- In office 1 October 2013 – 2 October 2017
- Constituency: Sogn og Fjordane

Leader of the Young Liberals
- In office 16 October 2010 – 26 October 2013
- Preceded by: Anne Solsvik
- Succeeded by: Tord Hustveit

Personal details
- Born: 15 May 1987 (age 38) Nordfjordeid, Sogn og Fjordane, Norway
- Party: Liberal

Sveinung Rotevatn (born 15 May 1987) is a Norwegian politician for the Liberal Party. Rotevatn comes from Nordfjordeid, Sogn og Fjordane, and has a master's degree in law from the University of Bergen. He served as Minister of Climate and the Environment from 2020 to 2021. Prior to that, he served as a state secretary at the same department from 2018 to 2020 under then minister Ola Elvestuen.

== Career ==
=== Young Liberals ===
Rotevatn became the leader of the Young Liberals of Norway, the Liberal Party's youth wing, in 2010 and was succeeded in October 2013 by Tord Hustveit.

=== Other ===
In 2013, Bergens Tidende called him the biggest political talent in Norway.

=== Parliament ===
Rotevatn was elected an MP from the Sogn og Fjordane county constituency in the 2013 Norwegian parliamentary election. He failed to win re-election in the 2017 election, but was later appointed State Secretary to the Department of Justice and Public Security when the Liberal Party went into coalition government with the Conservative Party and the Progress Party on 17 January 2018.

He was re-elected to the Storting in the 2021 election, this time from Hordaland.

In January 2022, both he and his successor as environment minister, Espen Barth Eide, agreed that Norwegian politicians had not done enough to fight climate change. Rotevatn stated: "I take responsibility for every ton of CO2 we emitted and did not emit when I was Minister of Climate. I'm glad the emissions went down when the Liberal Party ruled, but it has not gone down fast enough".

=== Minister of Climate and the Environment ===
On 24 January 2020, following the Progress Party's withdrawal from government, he was appointed Minister of the Environment.

=== Party deputy leader ===
In May 2020, he announced his intention to run for the party leadership in September to succeed outgoing leader Trine Skei Grande. At the time, he became the first person to announce his run for leader following Grande's decision to resign.

On 23 August, he was designated deputy leader of the party, with Abid Raja as second deputy and Melby as party leader, unanimously by the party's election committee.

At the party conference in September, he was elected first deputy leader, with Melby as leader and Raja as second deputy, unopposed.

The leadership trio were re-elected at the party convention in October 2022.

He resigned as deputy leader in December 2025 in order to become the new manager of the Bellona Foundation, a non-governmental environmental organisation. He was succeeded by Ingvild Wetrhus Thorsvik in March 2026.

Party political offices
Preceded by Ola Elvestuen	First Deputy Leader of the Liberal Party; 2020–2025	Succeeded by Ingvild Wetrhus Thorsvik
Preceded by Anne Solsvik	Leader of Young Liberals of Norway; 2010–2013	Succeeded by Tord Hustveit
Political offices
Preceded by Ola Elvestuen	Minister of Climate and the Environment; 2020–2021	Succeeded by Espen Barth Eide
