= Martin Fredrik Seip =

Norwegian physician

Martin Fredrik Seip (20 May 1921 – 6 May 2001) was a Norwegian physician.

He was the brother of politician Helge Seip. He took the dr.med. degree in 1953. He was appointed chief pediatrician at Rikshospitalet in 1968, and became a professor of medicine the same year. He chaired the Norwegian Medical Association from 1966 to 1969.

He resided at Blommenholm.

Preceded by Gerhard Larsen	President of the Norwegian Medical Association; 1966–1969	Succeeded by Axel Aubert
