= Anders Kirkhusmo =

Norwegian educator

Anders Kirkhusmo (17 December 1865 – 12 December 1949) was a Norwegian educator and union representative.

Anders Kirkhusmo was born at Ålen Municipality, in Søndre Trondhjem county, Norway. He was a teacher at the Klæbu Seminar 1885–1887. He worked in Røros from 1889 until 1892, then taught in elementary schools in Tolga, Brekken, Os, and Nord-Odal. He was a teacher at Elverum Seminar 1896–1902. He was a teacher at Vaterland in 1917 and in Majorstua from 1927 to 1935.

He was the first president of the Young Liberals of Norway, from 1909 to 1912. He was engaged in the party's newspapers Dagbladet and Østlendingen. He chaired the Norwegian Union of Teachers (Norges Lærerlag) for sixteen years, from 1917 to 1933. He was a member of several central committees, including chairman of two parliamentary school commissions. He published the memoirs Minner fra et langt arbeidsliv in 1945.
