= Jennie Johnsen =

Norwegian politician

Jennie Johnsen (born 3 December 1977 in Skien) is a Norwegian politician for the Liberal Party.

From 1998 to 2001 she was the leader of the Young Liberals of Norway, the youth wing of the Liberal Party. She was a vice leader of the Liberal Party from 2002 to 2004.

In 1995, at only 17 years of age, she was elected to serve in Skien city council. She held a seat in Oslo city council from 2003 to 2007.

She served as a deputy representative to the Norwegian Parliament from Oslo during the term 2005–2009.

Preceded by Sverre Molandsveen	Leader of the Young Liberals of Norway; 2003–2007	Succeeded by Monica Tjelmeland
