= Norway Scholarship =

Scholarship to study at Wadham College, University of Oxford

Norway Oxford Scholarship
- Name: Norway Scholarship
- Duration: 1920–present
- Present scholar: Mads Prøitz
- Notable alumni: Nordahl Grieg, P. A. Munch, Harald Sverdrup, Abid Q. Raja and Iver Neumann
- Amount: Approx. NOK 175,000

The Norway Scholarship is a scholarship to the University of Oxford that is awarded in Norway. Norway Scholars receive funding for one or two years of study and research at Oxford University, and the scholar always becomes a member of Wadham College.

The first Norway Scholarship was awarded in 1920. Since then, one Norway Scholar has been selected annually, except for a few periods, such as during the Second World War. The scholarship is highly competitive, and is awarded to a current student, or recent graduate of Oslo University. Past Norway Scholars have included Nordahl Grieg, Peter A. Munch and Harald Sverdrup.

== History ==
The idea for a scholarship fund enabling students from Royal Frederik University, (now University of Oslo) to study for one year at Wadham College in Oxford was conceived in 1919 by a young alumnus of the college, who during the war years 1914–18 had held the post of British vice-consul at Kristiansund in Møre og Romsdal, Norway. Arthur Ivor Garland Jayne (1882-1958) was a son of Francis Jayne (1845–1921) Lord Bishop of Chester. Arthur Jayne had married Fredrikke Marie Cathrine von Munthe af Morgenstierne, daughter of Professor Bredo Henrik von Munthe af Morgenstierne (1851–1930), Rector of the University of Oslo (1912–1918). As with famous Polar explorer Fridtjof Nansen, he gave NOK 5000.- towards the establishment of a Norwegian Oxford Scholarship Fund. Altogether Jayne succeeded in raising NOK. 60 000.- or approximately GBP 2780. Jayne spent his later life as a lecturer in English at the University of Oslo.

Arthur Jayne retrospectively explained his initiative in a letter dated 14. October 1945 to Professor Didrik Arup Seip (1884–1963), then Rector of Oslo University, in the following words:

At the time of the first world war – - – a considerable amount of ‘Allied’ propaganda material, sent to Norway and intended to inform Norwegian opinion about the war, proved ill-adapted to enlist the understanding sympathy of those who had previously had cultural or business contacts with the nations in conflict with the Allies. The experience seemed to indicate the great importance of any educational facilities which would bring the youth of Norway and Britain into really close association with each other. It struck me that one useful step in that direction could be some permanent arrangement which would enable Norwegian students to participate in the typically English form of university life that exists in the college system of Oxford and Cambridge. Without actual residence in a college this is impossible. But whereas foreign students have been able to attend courses at English universities, it has always been very difficult for them to obtain permission to reside at a college, sharing to the full all that the college environment can offer.

From 1920, with the exception of the years 1926–27 and the war years 1940–44, Norwegian students were awarded the Norway Scholarship for studies of the most varied description. However, as the basic funding of the scholarship proved inadequate, the scholars soon became dependent on supplementary grants from other university funds, but from the late 1970s even this arrangement proved inadequate to meet rising costs. For some years no scholars were appointed at all. The basic foundation capital had by then shrunk to only NOK. 130 000.- (about GBP 6500.- at the current rate of exchange).

In the late 1970s Alf Bøe (Wadham. 1952) as head of the Committee, called on Andor Birkeland (Wadham. 1946) of the Norwegian Broadcasting Corporation, accountant Sven Guldberg (Wadham. 1937) and former Minister for Culture Helge Sivertsen (Wadham. 1938). With the help of the College and of William Bentley, British Ambassador to Norway, they were able to raise NOK 1 170 000 (around GBP 117 000). In the 1990s Bøe formed a new committee consisting of Michael Benskin (St. Peter's. 1965), Haakon Melander (Balliol. 1966) and Erik Rudeng (Norway scholar. 1969). Iver B. Neumann (Norway Scholar. 1988) was recruited in 1993. When Bøe retired in 2003, Neumann took over as chair. Bjørn Blindheim (Norway Scholar. 1992) and Neumann formed a Norwegian chapter of the Oxford Society, with Blindheim as chair. Since 1981 the Committee has organised an annual dinner with a guest of honour from Oxford University, who has also given one or more lectures locally in Oslo. King Harald V of Norway (Balliol College.1960) often participates at the grand dinner of Norway Scholars that is held each year in Oslo by the Oxford University Society Norway.

== Past Norway Scholars ==
Year	Scholar	Degree subject
1920	G. Astrup-Hoel	Law
1921	Bjarne Hamre	English
1922	Christian Lasson Brun	Economics
1923	Johan Nordahl Brun Grieg	English History and Literature
1924	Erling Groth	Languages and Social-Economic Studies
1925	Hallvard Langeland	Maritime Law
1926–1927	No award given	
1928	Halfdan Olaus Christophersen	Dissertation work on the 18th century Danish-Norwegian philosopher Ludvig Holberg and his relations to the philosophy of John Locke
1929	Paul Quale	Audit studies
1930	Georg E. Pettersen	Philology
1931	Christian Brinch	Languages, Literature and Finance
1932	Trygve Leivestad	Old English Law
1933	Peter A. Munch	Studies in the Old Testament
1934	Arne Grieg	Medicine
1935	Fredrik Christian Stoud Platou	Law
1936	Kåre Birkelund	English Language and Literature
1937	Sven Dalhoff Guldberg	Social economy (part of an Audit studies examination), and British Culture
1938	Helge Sivertsen	English History, Politics and International Relations
1939	Harald Brinchmann	Studies in English
1940–1944	No scholarships awarded during the War	
1945	Just Faaland	Audit studies
1946	Andor Birkeland	Modern English social history
1947	Arne Aasgaard	Modern English social history
1948	Harald Ulrik Sverdrup	
1949	Per Fuglum	
1950	Jan Fredrik Marstrander	English Literature
1951	Jan Fredrik Marstrander	English Literature
1952	Alf Bøe	B.Litt. on Theories of Victorian design
1953	Alf Bøe	B.Litt. on Theories of Victorian design
1954	Ivar Johnsen	History of Literature
1955	Leif Mevik	
1956	Magne Malmanger	Early 19th century English landscape painting
1957	Tor Neumann	Russian, and comparative studies in English and German literature
1958	Knut Nordli	English language
1959	Hjalte Lymann	English law, particularly maritime law
1960	Lars Jacob Krogh	English language and literature
1961	No award given	
1962	Jørgensen, Nils-Johan	
1963	No award given	
1964	Dag Christopher Wold	
1965	Jostein Stokkeland	Studies for Thesis, Cand.Philol. on subjects English and William Tyndale.
1966	Tryggve Gjesdal	B.A. in Philosophy, Politics and Economics
1967	John Arthur Jayne Skard	Independent studies in Physics
1968	Jon Haakstad	English Literature
1969	Erik Rudeng	B.A. in Modern History
1970	Erik Rudeng	
1971	Ulf Andenæs	
1972	Frode Haverkamp	Diploma in History of Art
1973–1975	No award given	
1976	Jon M. S. Haarberg	Classical Philology
1977	No award given	
1978	Trond B. Hansen	English Literature
1979	No award given	
1981 & 1982	Widar Halén	Studies for D.Phil. on Victorian designer Christopher Dresser
1983	Sverre Rustad	English Literature
1984	Pål Foss	Industrial Relations
1985	No scholar	
1986	Martin Hoftun	Studies for a D.Phil. on the history of Nepal
1987	No award given	
1988	Iver B. Neumann	International Relations, M.Phil. 1989
1989	Kirsti Kvaløy	D.Phil. in Biochemistry (Genetics)
1990	Alexandra Bech	International Law
1991	Nils A. Nissen	English Literature
1992	Bjørn Blindheim	Economics
1993	Jonas Jølle	Greek
1994	Haakon Skaaner	Theoretical chemistry, quantum mechanics
1995	Kristin Joachimsen	Studies in the Prophet Jesaiah
1996	Grete Synnøve Foss	Analysis of amoloid light chagin protein (AL-protein) isolated from the spleen of the patient
1997	Ole-Reinert Abildsnes	History of Ideas and of Literature
1998	Anne Hammerstad	Studies for D.Phil. in International Relations
1999	Røttingen, Jon Arne	Studies at Department of Zoology, Mcc Course in Epidemiology, Evolution and Control
2000	Nilsen, André	Industrial Relations
2001	No award given	
2002	Otterholt, Tor	Studies for M.Phil in Russian and East European studies.
2003	Abid Q. Raja	Law
2004–2005	No award given	
2006	Guri Rosén	Studies for MSc in Sociology
2007	No award given	
2008	Sara Shah	Medicine
2009	Kristian Alfsnes	Medicine
2010	Bedeho Mender	D.Phil. in Computational Neuroscience
2011	Knut Aukland	MSt in Oriental Studies
2012	Bjørnar Sverdrup-Thygeson	MSc in Modern Chinese Studies
2013	Mats Julius Stensrud	MSc in Applied Statistics (in Medicine)
2014	Louisa Layne	DPhil English Literature
2015	Jan Henrik Wiik; Kjølv Egeland	MSc in Mathematics and Foundations of Computer Science; DPhil in International Relations
2016	Julia Kristine Kotthaus	DPhil in Archaeology
2017	No award given	
2018	No award given	
2019	Simen Olav Njaa Sopp	DPhil in Materials
2020	Dennis Christensen; Peder Skjelbred	MSc Mathematical Sciences; BPhil Philosophy
2021	No award given	
2022	No award given	
2023	Lene Anika Gödde	DPhil Chemistry
2024	Mia Dobbing; Edvard Syse	DPhil Oncology; MSt History
2025	Mads Prøitz	DPhil Classical Archaeology
