= Olav Gullvåg =

Norwegian playwright, novelist, poet and editor

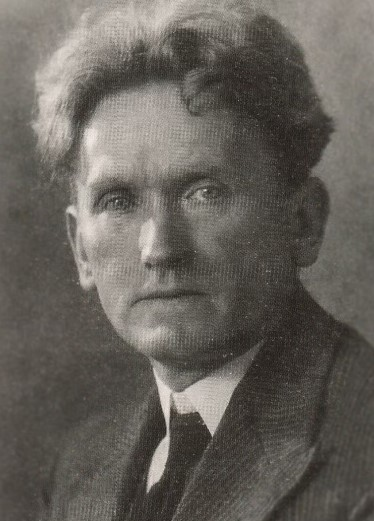
Olav Gullvåg

Olav Gullvåg (31 December 1885 – 25 September 1961) was a Norwegian playwright, novelist, poet, and editor. He was born in Trondheim. He worked as editor-in-chief of Søndmøre Folkeblad from 1911 to 1912, Norig from 1912 to 1921, and Gula Tidend from 1921 to 1929. From 1920 to 1926 he was the chairman of the Young Liberals of Norway, the youth wing of the Liberal Party.

He published several novels, plays and poems, including The Saint Olav Drama composed in 1930 and staged annually in Stiklestad since 1954. His novels include the cycle of books from the history of the Telemark county which take place in the 18th century; these were extraordinarily successful especially abroad (they were translated into Swedish, Danish, Icelandic, Norwegian, German, Russian, Dutch, French, Czech, Hungarian, Italian and Latvian). In 1938 he was awarded the Melsom Prize for his first Telemark novel Det byrja ei jonsoknatt.

His son was the philosopher Ingemund Gullvåg (1925–1998).

Preceded by Torkell Løvland	Chairman of the Young Liberals of Norway; 1920–1926	Succeeded by Anton Laurin
