= Ola Thorleif Ruud =

Norwegian politician

Ola Thorleif Ruud (6 September 1926 – 25 February 2018) was a Norwegian politician from the Conservative Party.

He was born in Ål, and moved to Oslo to study. He graduated with the cand-.jur. degree in 1951, worked as a deputy judge in Alta, Norway|Alta from 1954 to 1955 before moving back to Ål. Here he opened his own lawyer's office, which he operated until 1997.

Ruud was a member of the executive committee of Ål municipal council from 1955 to 1959, served as mayor from 1959 to 1967 and was again a member from 1971 to 1975. From 1959 to 1967 and 1975 to 1979 he was also a member of Buskerud county council. He chaired the county party chapter from 1961 to 1969. He was appointed State Secretary in the Ministry of Transport and Communications from 1966 to July 1969 and October 1969 to 1971, during the cabinet Borten. The hiatus came because he ran for general election in 1969, and incumbent State Secretaries are not eligible for election per the Norwegian Constitution. He never won a seat in a general election, but served as a deputy representative in the Norwegian Parliament from Buskerud during the terms 1958–1961, 1961–1965, 1965–1969 and 1969–1973.

Ruud chaired the board of directors of Hallingdal Kraftlag from 1981 to 1994, the regional insurance company from 1957 to 1994 and the local savings bank from 1970 to 1983. He was a board member of the local power plant from 1955 to 1975, of Norwegian Automobile Federation from 1978–1994 and of Gjensidige.
