= Gudmund Saxrud =

Norwegian civil servant and diplomat

Gudmund Saxrud (27 January 1920 – 15 January 2003) was a Norwegian civil servant and diplomat.

He was born in Stange in Hedmark county. Having graduated as cand.oecon. in 1948, he was hired as an assisting secretary in the Ministry of Trade, and worked there until 1958. From 1963 to 1965 he worked at the European Free Trade Association Secretariat in Geneva, only to return to the Norwegian Ministry of Trade. He was Vice a sub-director in the Ministry of Foreign Affairs from 1970 to 1972, Vice Secretary-General of the Nordic Council of Ministers from 1972 to 1977, and Secretary-General of the Nordic Council from 1977 to 1982. After this he has worked as an advisor.

Diplomatic posts
Preceded by Helge Seip	Secretary-General of the Nordic Council; 1977–1982	Succeeded by Ilkka-Christian Björklund
