= Leiv Magnus Vidvei =

Norwegian economist, civil servant and politician

Leiv Magnus Vidvei (11 September 1923 – 15 October 2016) was a Norwegian economist, civil servant and politician for the Liberal Party.

He was born in Time Municipality as a son of teacher Tor Vidvei (1888–1969) and Olga Gudmestad (1895–1972). In 1954 he married Alfhild Stene.

He finished his secondary education in 1943 and took Stavanger Commerce School in 1944. In 1950 he graduated with the cand.oecon. degree from the University of Oslo. He was hired as a secretary in Statistics Norway in 1949 and was promoted to acting assisting secretary in 1954 before moving on to become head of department in the Bank of Norway in 1955.

He was a member of Riksskattestyret from 1967 to 1971, and also deputy member of the municipal council of Bærum Municipality during the same period. From 1970 to 1971 he was appointed to Borten's Cabinet as a State Secretary in the Ministry of Finance and Customs. He has also worked in NATO and the International Monetary Fund.

He resided in Bekkestua and died in October 2016 at the age of 93.
