= Kjell Hanssen =

Norwegian politician (1932–2014)

Kjell Hanssen (30 April 1932 – 25 December 2014) was a Norwegian politician from the Conservative Party.

He was appointed State Secretary in the Ministry of Trade and Shipping from 1969, during Borten's Cabinet. He lost the position in 1971 when Borten's Cabinet fell. He also served as a deputy representative in the Parliament of Norway from Akershus during the term 1969–1973. In total he met during 56 days of parliamentary session.

Hanssen was a member of the Broadcasting Council from 1980 to 1985.
