= Jan Tore Odegard =

Norwegian consultant and politician

Jan Tore Odegard (born 14 October 1940) is a Norwegian consultant and politician for the Conservative Party.

He was born in Oslo as a son of chief physician Jan Nicolai Thorstein Odegard and Bergljot Lysholm Bugge. He finished his secondary education at Oslo Cathedral School in 1958, and also graduated from Oslo Commerce School in 1963 and the Norwegian School of Economics in 1966. While studying here he presided over the Students' Parliament of Bergen in 1965. In 1965 he married Kristin Houge, her too a daughter of a physician.

He was a consultant, and had several shorter director jobs in his early career. In 1967 he was director of finance at Den Nationale Scene, and in 1969 he was hired as head of department in Dyno Industrier. He was soon promoted to secretary for the board. In January 1971 he was appointed to Borten's Cabinet as a State Secretary in the Ministry of Defence. He remained so until the cabinet fell on 17 March. He also chaired the Conservative Party branch in Vestre Bærum from 1970 to 1971.

After losing his government position, he had a brief tenure as director in Nationaltheatret before moving to London in 1971 to work as a consultant for McKinsey & Co. He left in 1973 to become director in the companies O. Ditlef-Simonsen Jr. and Scandinavian Petroleum until 1975. From 1977 he was a head of division in Norcem, and after serving as vice chief executive for one year he established his own consultant firm in 1983.

He was a board member of the Norwegian UNICEF committee from 1967 to 1971, and through his consulting business he has also been a board member of Bedriftsøkonomisk Institutt, Sparebanken NOR, Det Norske Veritas, Unitor, Universitetsforlaget, Bokredit, Petter Olsen AS, Fred. Olsen, Timex and Norsk Film.
