= Trygve Leivestad =

Norwegian judge

- Born: 29 January 1907; Tromsø, Norway
- Died: 14 December 1994; Oslo, Norway
- Education: University of Oslo; Oxford University
- Occupation: Judge
- Relatives: Ragnar Leivestad (brother)

Trygve Leivestad (29 January 1907 – 14 December 1994) was a Norwegian deputy judge.

== Early life and education ==
He was born in Tromsø as a son of lawyer Ludvig Bernhard Leivestad (1878–1955) and Valborg Dorothea, née Skouge (1880–1957). His brother was theologian Ragnar Leivestad (1916–2002). He took his examen artium in 1925 and graduated with the cand.jur. degree in 1931. During 1932, he studied old English law at University of Oxford under a Norwegian Oxford Scholarship.

== Career ==
From 1934, Leivestad was a deputy judge for the Vadsø District Court. He was a secretary in the Ministry of Justice from 1937, research fellow at the University of Oslo from 1939, assistant secretary in the Ministry of Justice from 1942 and deputy under-secretary of state from 1945. In 1947, Leivestad was appointed presiding judge in Hålogaland Court of Appeal. He was named Supreme Court Justice in 1958, serving until 1977 when he retired.

He was a board member of NRK from 1963, and chaired the board 1968–1971. He was also a member of the municipal council of Tromsøysund Municipality, representing the Christian Democratic Party. He was affiliated with Moral Re-Armament, the Christian Peace Association and the Anti-Slavery Society, and was also an anti-tobacco activist.

He died in December 1994.
