= Jon Ola Norbom =

Norwegian economist and politician (1923–2020)

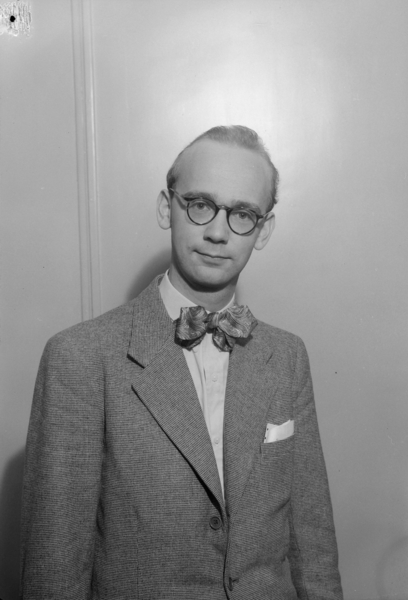
- Norbom in 1950

Minister of Finance
- In office 18 October 1972 – 16 October 1973
- Prime Minister: Lars Korvald
- Preceded by: Ragnar Christiansen
- Succeeded by: Per Kleppe

State Secretary for the Ministry of Finance
- In office 13 February 1967 – 16 October 1969
- Prime Minister: Per Borten
- Minister: Ole Myrvoll

Leader of the Young Liberals
- In office 1950–1952
- Preceded by: Olaf Kortner
- Succeeded by: Simen Skjønsberg

Personal details
- Born: Jon Ola Haguer Norbom; 15 December 1923 Bærum, Akershus, Norway
- Died: 12 April 2020 (aged 96) Suwanee, Georgia, U.S.
- Party: Liberal
- Spouse: Ellen Ann Hook (m. 1954)

Jon Ola Hauger Norbom (15 December 1923 – 12 April 2020) was a Norwegian economist and politician.

== Biography ==
During World War II, in 1942, Norbom was imprisoned for a brief time at Grini concentration camp. Then, in November 1943, he was among the students who were arrested by the German occupying forces in Norway as part of a general imprisonment of all male, non-NS students at the University of Oslo. He was imprisoned in the German concentration camp Buchenwald.

From 1950 to 1952, he was the leader of the Young Liberals of Norway, the youth wing of the Liberal Party. He was State Secretary in the Ministry of Finance from 1967 to 1969, during Borten's cabinet, and became Minister of Finance from 1972 to 1973 during the Korvald's cabinet. Norbom never held elected political office.

He graduated as cand.oecon. from the University of Oslo in 1949, and studied international economics and European integration at the College of Europe in Bruges from 1952 to 1953. He subsequently worked as a researcher with the National Bureau of Economic Research, the United Nations and the General Agreement on Tariffs and Trade (GATT) during the 1950s and 1960s. He was director in the International Trade Centre Unctad/Gatt from 1973 to 1984, the Permanent Secretary in the Norwegian Ministry of Health and Social Affairs from 1984 to 1993, and member of the United Nations Social Policy Committee from 1987 to 1990.

Norbom died in Suwanee, Georgia on 12 April 2020, aged 96.

Party political offices
Preceded by Olaf Erling Kortner	Chairman of the Young Liberals of Norway; 1950–1952	Succeeded by Simen Skjønsberg
Political offices
Preceded by Ragnar Christiansen	Minister of Finance (Norway); 1972–1973	Succeeded by Per Kleppe
