= Gunn-Vivian Eide =

Norwegian politician (born 1964)

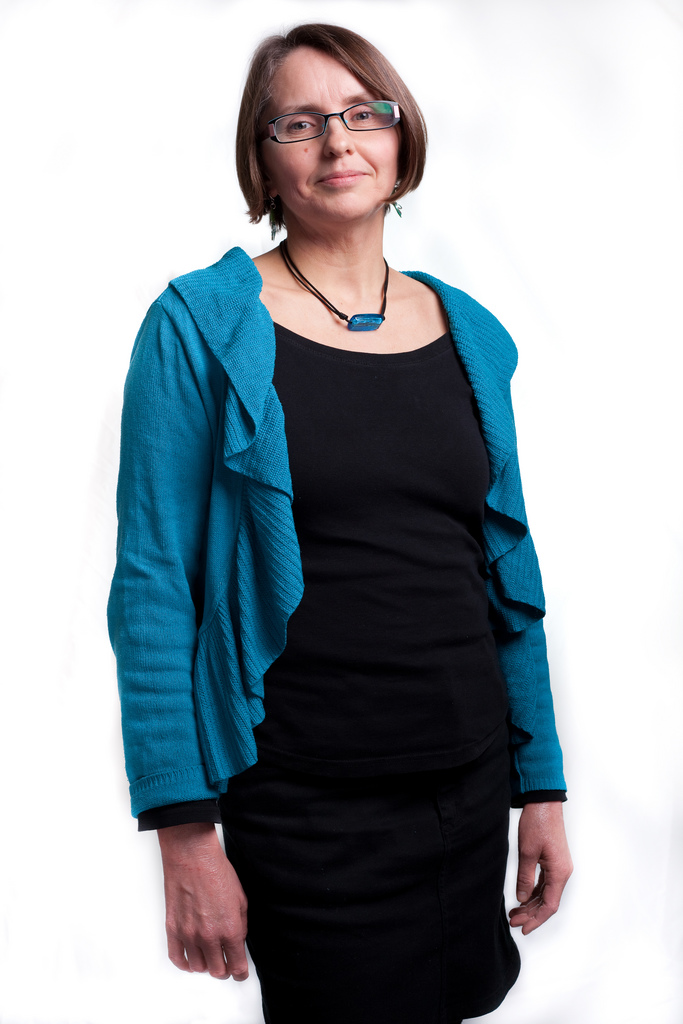
Gunn-Vivian Eide

Gunn-Vivian Eide (born 21 May 1964) is a Norwegian politician for the Liberal Party.

From 1990 to 1992 she was the leader of the Young Liberals of Norway, the youth wing of the Liberal Party.

She served as a deputy representative to the Parliament of Norway from Hordaland during the term 1997–2001. In total she met during 3 days of parliamentary session. From 1995 to 1999 she was the municipal councillor (kommunalråd) of Bergen.

Party political offices
| Preceded by Atle Hamar | Leader of Young Liberals of Norway; 1990–1992 | Succeeded by Per Tore Woie |
