= Ragnar Leivestad =

Norwegian theologian (1916–2002)

Ragnar Skouge Leivestad (27 June 1916 – 14 January 2002) was a Norwegian theologian.

He was born in Strinda Municipality to judge Ludvig Bernhard Leivestad and Valborg Dorothea Skauge, and was a brother of Supreme Court Justice Trygve Leivestad.

He took the dr.theol. degree in 1954, and was a professor at the University of Oslo from 1966 to 1983. His specialty was the study of the New Testament. English releases include Christ the Conqueror, Ideas of Conflict and Victory in the New Testament (1954) and Christ in His Own Respect (1987, Norwegian version 1982).

He was married and had three children, Kristin, Bjørn, and Valborg.
