= Anne Solsvik =

Norwegian politician (born 1981)

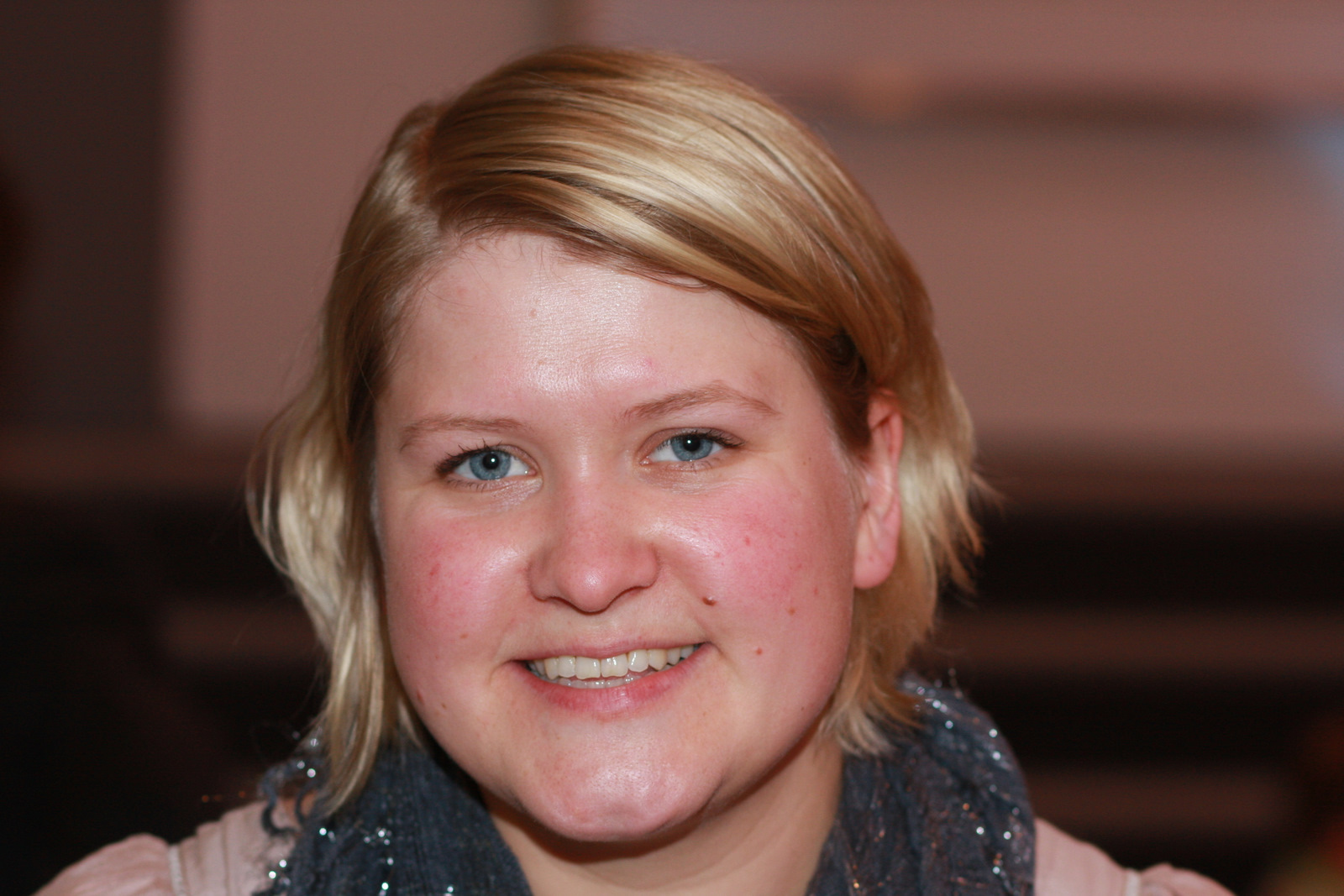
Anne Solsvik in 2009.

Anne Tørå Solsvik (born 25 February 1981) is a Norwegian politician for the Liberal Party (Venstre). She became State Secretary at Ministry of Education and Research in 2020; until 2020 she was a partner at First House.

Between 2007 and 2010 she was the leader of the Young Liberals of Norway, the youth wing of the Liberal Party. Upon her election she stated that her most important goal was to work for Norwegian membership in the European Union.

Solsvik is also a member of the city council in her home town Arendal.

From October 2020 she served as a State Secretary in the Ministry of Education. She left when Solberg's Cabinet fell in October 2021.

Party political offices
Preceded by Lars-Henrik Michelsen	Leader of Young Liberals of Norway; 2007–2010	Succeeded by Sveinung Rotevatn
