= Ingvild Wetrhus Thorsvik =

Norwegian politician (born 1991)

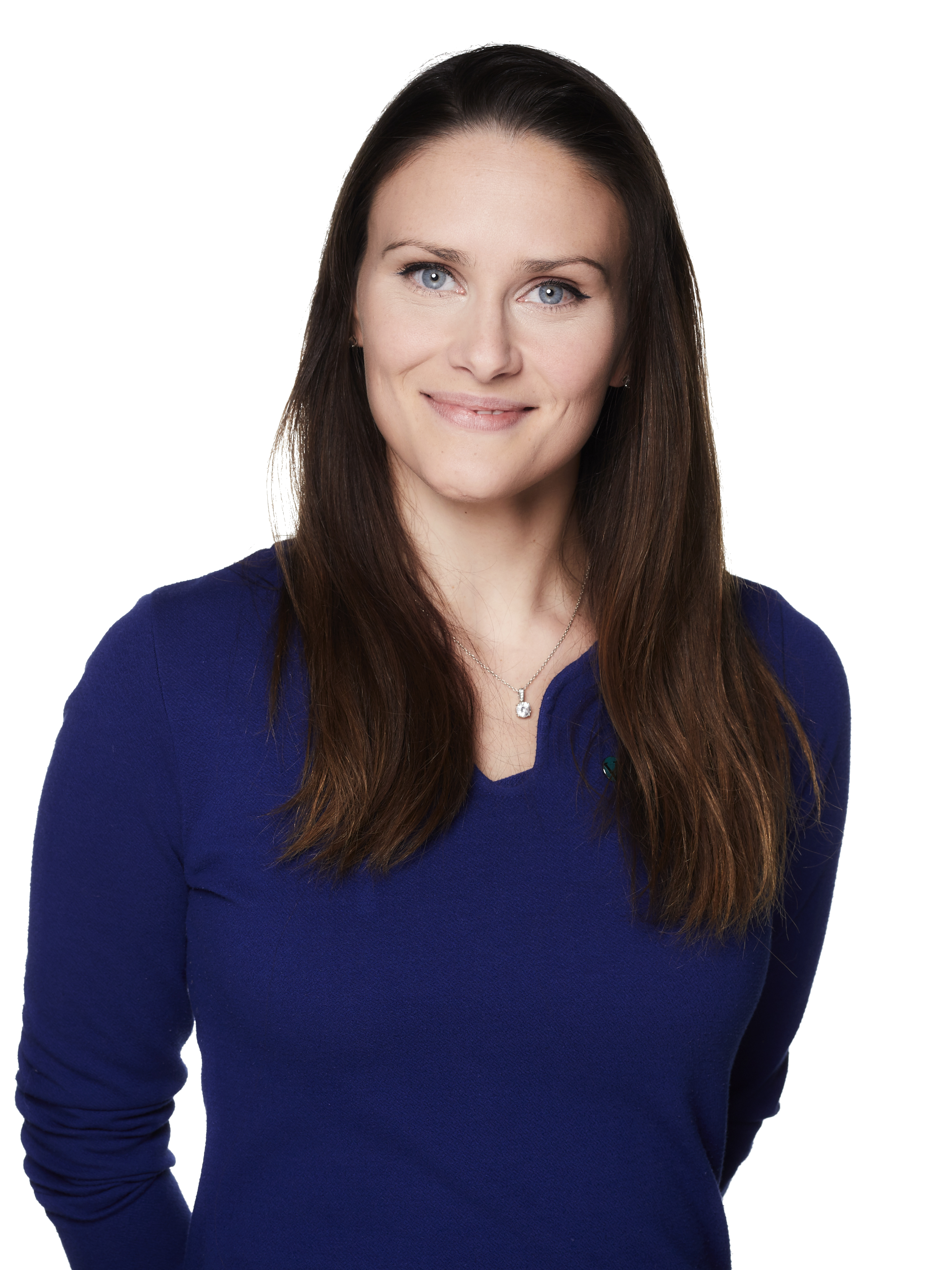
- Thorsvik in 2016

First Deputy Leader of the Liberal Party
- Incumbent
- Assumed office 18 March 2026
- Leader: Guri Melby
- Preceded by: Sveinung Rotevatn

Member of the Storting
- In office 1 October 2021 – 30 September 2025
- Constituency: Vest-Agder

Personal details
- Born: 19 November 1991 (age 34)
- Party: Liberal
- Education: University of Oslo
- Occupation: Politician

Ingvild Wetrhus Thorsvik (born 19 November 1991) is a Norwegian politician. She served as a member of parliament for Vest-Agder from 2021 to 2025 and has been serving as the first deputy leader of the Liberal Party since 2026.

She was elected representative to the Storting from the constituency of Vest-Agder for the period 2021–2025, for the Liberal Party. She was a member of the Justice Committee and the Preparatory Credentials Committee for the period 2021–2025. She lost her seat at the 2025 election.

In January 2026, she announced her candidacy for the deputy leadership of the Liberal Party in the wake of Sveinung Rotevatn's resignation in December 2025. The party's election committee officially designated her as Rotevatn's successor two weeks before the extrodinary convention. She was formally elected at the convention held on 18 March.

In local politics, she was a member of the Mandal municipal council from 2011 to 2019 and served as the municipality's deputy mayor from 2015 to 2019.
