= Ottar Fjærvoll =

Norwegian politician

Personal details
- Born: April 9, 1914
- Died: November 28, 1995 (aged 80–81)
- Party: Centre Party

Ottar Fjærvoll (9 April 1914 - 28 September 1995) was a Norwegian politician from the Centre Party.

He was appointed State Secretary in the Ministry of Fisheries from 1966 to 1968, during the cabinet Borten. He served as a deputy representative in the Norwegian Parliament from Hordaland during the term 1954–1957.
