= Helge Solum Larsen =

Norwegian politician (1969–2015)

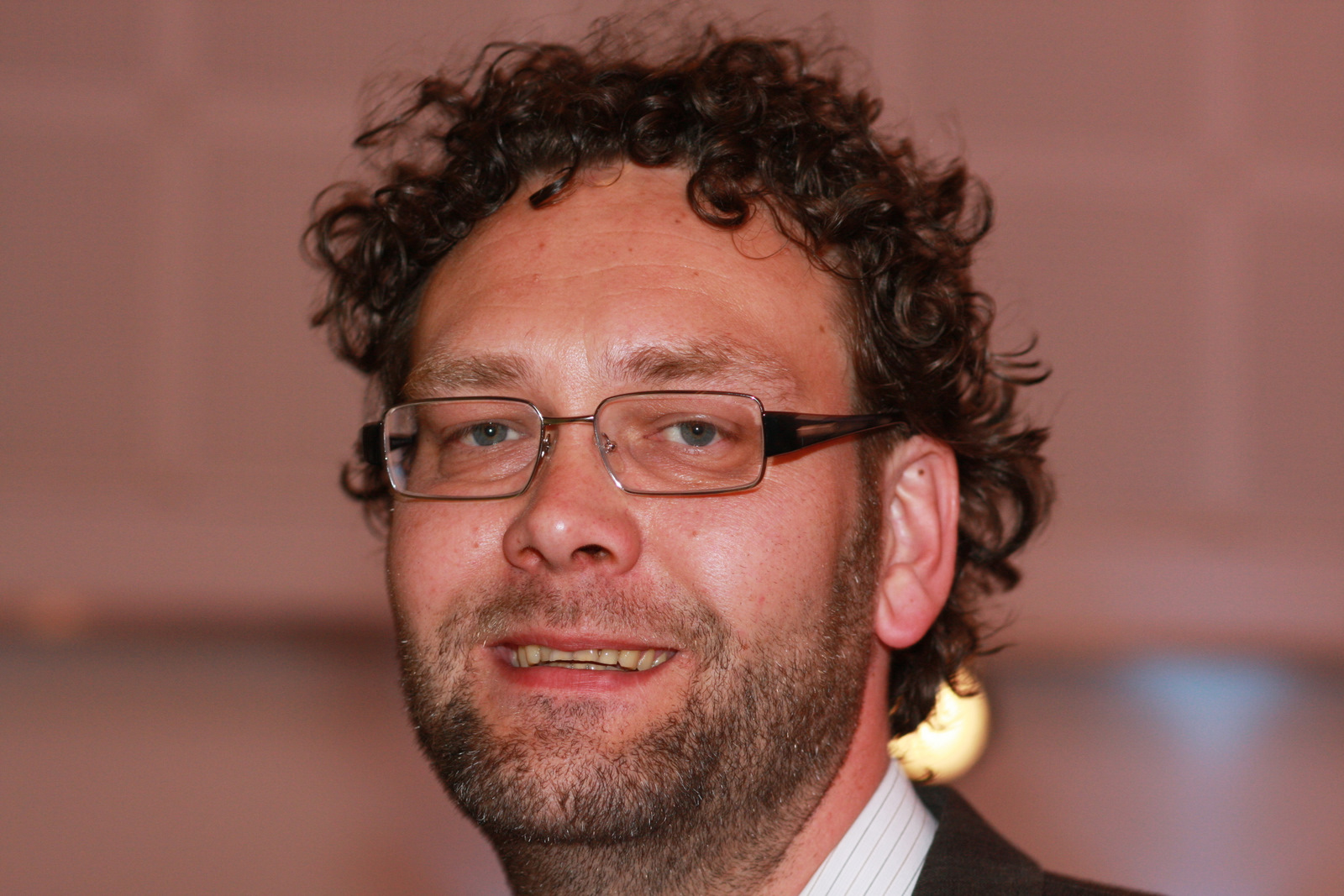
- Solum Larsen in 2009

First Deputy Leader of the Liberal Party
- In office 17 April 2010 – 7 February 2012
- Leader: Trine Skei Grande
- Preceded by: Position created
- Succeeded by: Ola Elvestuen

Personal details
- Born: 14 January 1969 Stavanger, Rogaland, Norway
- Died: 18 December 2015 (aged 46) Oslo, Norway
- Party: Liberal
- Children: 2

Helge Solum Larsen (14 January 1969 – 18 December 2015) was a Norwegian businessman and politician for the Liberal Party. He served as deputy leader of the party from 2010 to 2012.

== Early life and education ==
Solum Larsen was a goldsmith by education.

== Political career ==
From 1994 to 1997 he was leader of the Young Liberals of Norway, the youth wing of the Liberal Party. He served as a deputy representative to the Parliament of Norway from Rogaland during the terms 1997–2001 and 2005–2009.

In local politics he served several terms on the municipal council of Stavanger Municipality, beginning as an alternate in 1987 and a full representative in 1991. He chaired the city's Liberal Party chapter from 2000 to 2005 and the countywide party chapter from 2005 to 2010. In 2008 he was elected to the national party board. He was elected deputy leader of the Liberal Party at the 2010 party convention.

In February 2012, Solum Larsen resigned from all his party positions after a 17-year-old girl accused him of raping her at the Rogaland Liberal Party's annual congress in Suldal; he said that only consensual sex had occurred, and was briefly admitted to the psychiatric clinic at Stavanger University Hospital. In October the Rogaland public prosecutor declined to pursue the case. The decision was appealed, but in January 2013, the Norwegian Prosecuting Authority also declined to prosecute, effectively dismissing the charges due to lack of evidence. He left the Liberal Party, but returned to politics in January 2014 and continued to serve on the Stavanger city council as an independent until October 2015.

== Political positions ==
In local politics, Solum Larsen worked for integration and job opportunities for immigrants and for treatment-based policies towards drug addicts. He actively defended the wooden buildings of Stavanger. He was largely responsible for averting the digging up of Nytorget, and demolition of several of these, for the construction of an underground carpark. In the area of development and transport, he was an advocate for railways who was largely responsible for the national government's decision in 2005 to double-track the railway in the Stavanger/Sandnes urban region, and argued for light rail being central in the regional transport plan. He was also involved in the discussions concerning the Ryfast tunnel connection and the new E39; he was influential in routing tunnels to benefit residents of Hundvåg, but his proposal for lengthening an E39 tunnel to reduce the impact on Tasta was rejected.

== Personal life and death ==
Solum Larsen had two children. He died from a cerebral haemorrhage on 18 December 2015.

Preceded by Per Tore Woie	Leader of Young Liberals of Norway; 1994–1997	Succeeded by Sverre Molandsveen
