= Halfdan Olaus Christophersen =

Norwegian historian, literature researcher and non-fiction writer

- Born: 13 December 1902; Drammen, Norway
- Died: 27 May 1980 (aged 77)
- Occupation: Historian

Halfdan Olaus Christophersen (13 December 1902 – 27 May 1980) was a Norwegian historian, literature researcher and non-fiction writer.

== Personal life ==
Christophersen was born at Drammen in Buskerud, Norway. He was the son of Tollef Christophersen (1878–1949) and Emma Langager (1880–1962). After graduating artium in Arendal in 1921 he began studying philology at the University of Kristiania.

== Career ==
Christophersen attended Wadham College at Oxford University under a Norwegian Oxford Scholorship. His doctorate thesis at Wadham College, Oxford was a treatment of John Locke (A Bibliographical Introduction to the Study of John Locke 1932). Christophersen became a Rockefeller Fellow in 1932 and was able to visit universities in Germany, Switzerland and the Netherlands before finishing at Stanford University in California.

From 1936 he became engaged as secretary at the Institute of Higher International Studies in Paris. From 1940 Christophersen was a staff member of the Chr. Michelsen Institute in Bergen, Norway.

During the occupation of Norway by Nazi Germany he was a central member of the Norwegian resistance movement. From late 1944 he lived undercover as an active member of Hjemmefrontens Ledelse. After World War II, he served as director of the Department of Information Science and Media Studies at the University of Bergen (1946–1954).

He was editor of the three volumes of Den store krigen, published from 1946 to 1949. Among his other works are biographies of Marcus Jacob Monrad, Eilert Sundt and Niels Treschow. He wrote several books on the history of travelling and tourism, and World War II memoirs Fra nød til seir.

== Publications ==
- A bibliographical introduction to the study of John Locke. Franklin, New York. 1968. OCLC 11010.
- Eilert Sundt : en dikter i kjensgjerninger (in Norwegian). Gyldendal Norsk forlag, Oslo. 1962. OCLC 11472257.
- Pa ̇gamle veier og nye stier i Oslomarka (in Norwegian). Gyldendal Norsk forlag, Oslo. 1972. ISBN 9788205054325. OCLC 35367819.
- Niels Treschow, 1751-1833 : en tenker mellom to tidsaldrer (in Norwegian). Grøndal, Oslo. 1977. OCLC 4191928.
- Marcus Jacob Monrad; et blad av norsk dannelses historie i det 19. århundre (in Norwegian). Gyldendal, Oslo. 1959. OCLC 11253668.
