= Lars-Henrik Paarup Michelsen =

Norwegian politician

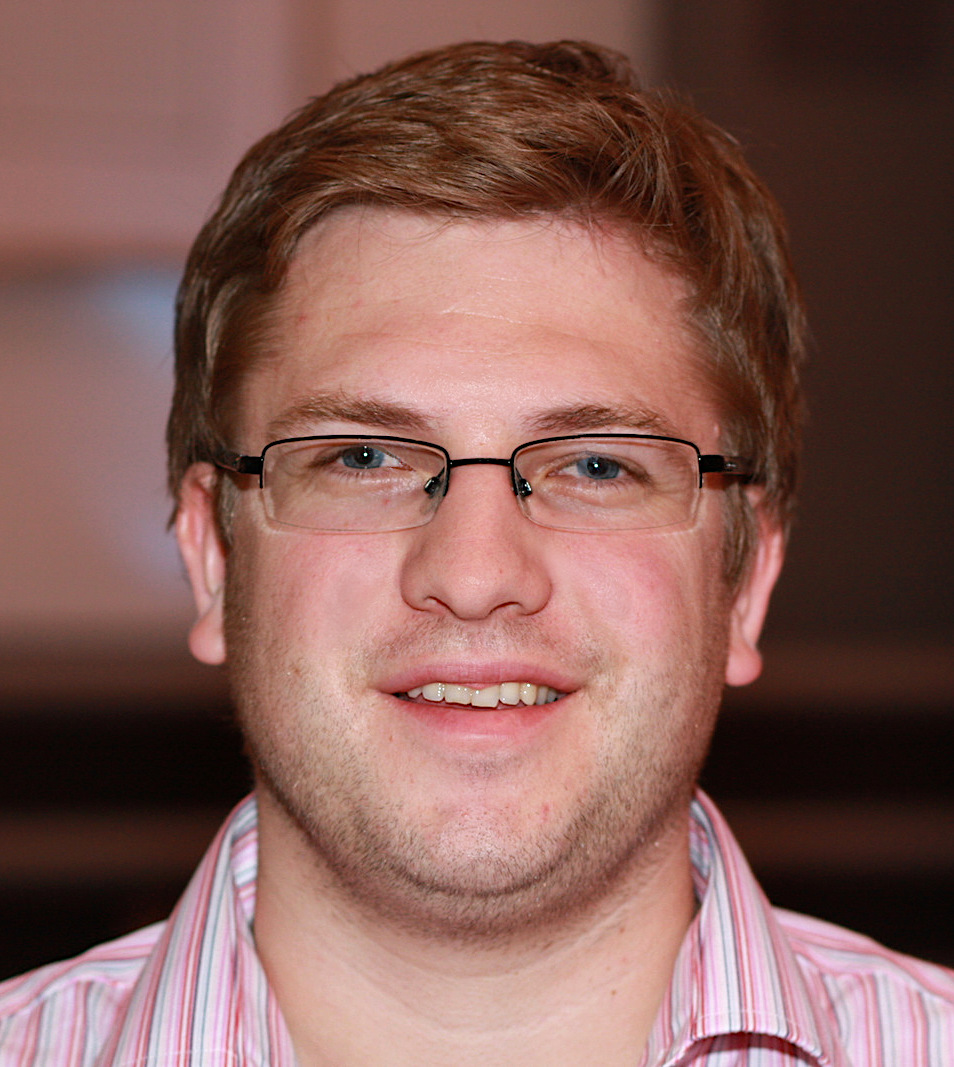

Leader of the Young Liberals of Norway
- In office 2003–2007
- Preceded by: Monica Tjelmeland
- Succeeded by: Anne Solsvik

Personal details
- Born: 23 April 1981 (age 44)
- Party: Liberal

Lars-Henrik Paarup Michelsen (born 23 April 1981) is a Norwegian politician for the Liberal Party. He was leader of the party's youth wing, Young Liberals of Norway, from 2003 to 2007.

He served as deputy representative to the Norwegian Parliament from Hordaland during the term 2005–2009.

== Background ==
Michelsen hails from Austevoll municipality in Hordaland on the south-western coast of Norway. He has studied comparative politics at the University of Bergen. For one year he worked as a volunteer for the Strømme Foundation in Uganda. He has served his civilian service for Bergen Turlag, a member organization of the Norwegian Trekking Association.

== Political career ==
Between 2002-2003 Michelsen was the international secretary for the Young Liberals. In 2006 he was a youth delegate to the United Nations General Assembly. He has previously been a candidate for the Storting, the last time in 2009 when he was second candidate, following Lars Sponheim.

As leader of Young Liberals of Norway Michelsen supported the entry of Norway into the European Union, although the parent party did not. As of 2005, Michelsen worked towards modernising the Young Liberals by introducing blogging, house-visiting and telephone-calling to get a more direct contact with the politicians. These methods are not yet considered normal for political parties in Norway.

As of February 2010 he is also the leader of the cross political campaign Stopp Datalagringsdirektivet (fighting to reject EU's Data Retention Directive) and works for the Norwegian Data Inspectorate.

Michelsen was elected to the board of the Norwegian branch of the World Federalist Movement (Norwegian: Én Verden) in 2010.

Preceded by Monica Tjelmeland	Leader of the Young Liberals of Norway; 2003–2007	Succeeded by Anne Solsvik
