= Ane Breivik =

Norwegian politician (born 1998)

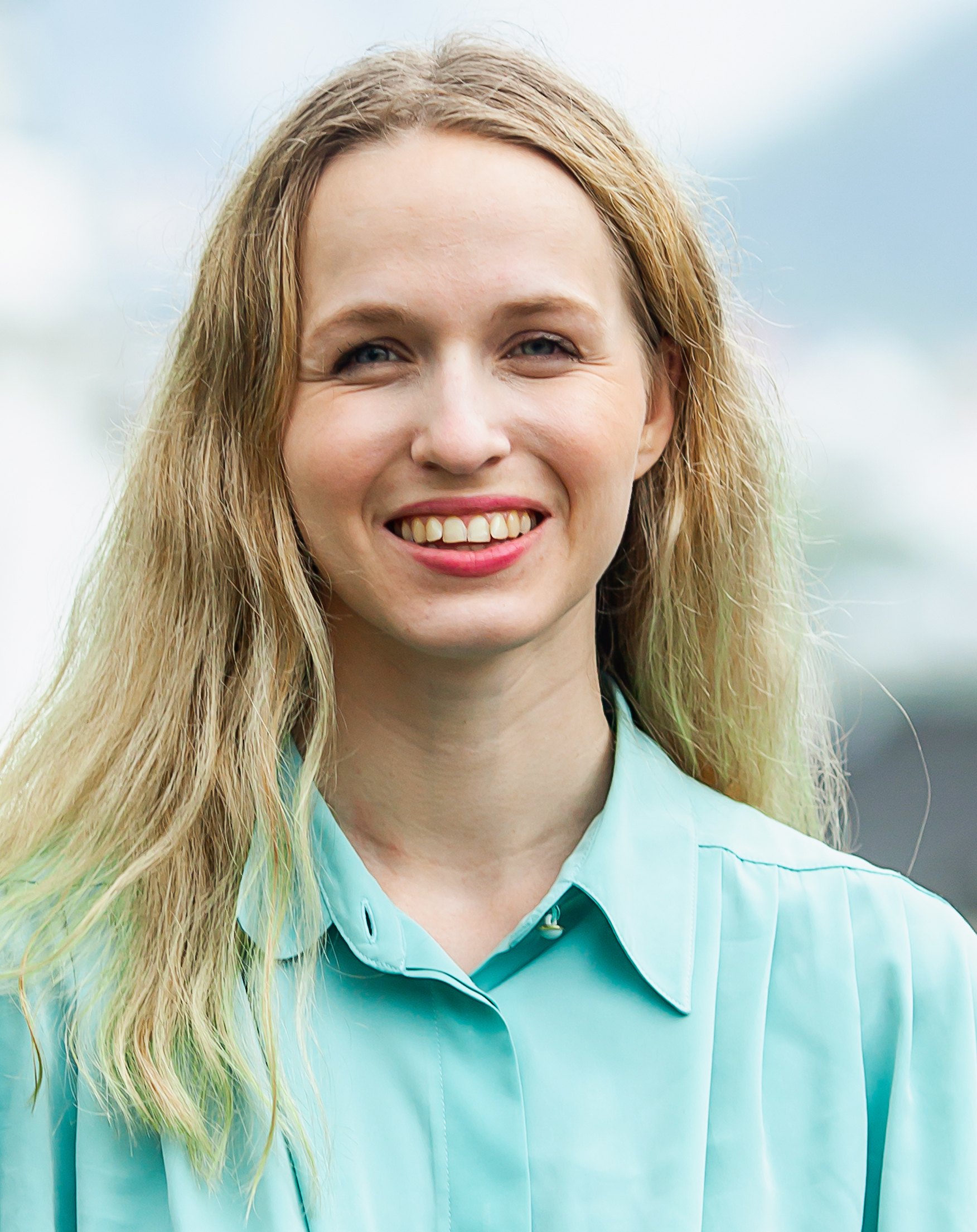

Leader of the Young Liberals
- In office 7 November 2021 – 26 October 2024
- Preceded by: Sondre Hansmark
- Succeeded by: Omar Svendsen-Yagci

First Deputy Leader of the Young Liberals
- In office 1 November 2019 – 7 November 2021
- Leader: Sondre Hansmark
- Preceded by: Kjersti Konstanse Løfors
- Succeeded by: Timo Nikolaisen

Personal details
- Born: 3 July 1998 (age 28) Bærum, Akershus, Norway
- Party: Liberal
- Education: United World College Maastricht; University of Bergen

Ane Breivik (born 3 July 1998 in Bærum) is a Norwegian politician for the Liberal Party.

== Early life and education ==
Breivik was born on 3 July 1998.

She studies law at the University of Bergen and has previously attended the United World Colleges in Maastricht.

== Political career ==
=== Young Liberals ===
She was the first deputy leader of Young Liberals of Norway from 2019 to 2021, and was leader from 2021 to 2024. She was re-elected in 2023. In May 2024, she announced that she wouldn't be seeking re-election at the next party convention, and instead aim to be elected to the Storting from the Akershus constituency at the next parliamentary election. She was succeeded by her deputy, Omar Svendsen-Yagci at the 2024 convention.

In 2020 she was one of the signatories of the "Call for Inclusive Feminism," a document which led to the establishment of the Initiative for Inclusive Feminism.

=== Parliament ===
Breivik was elected as a deputy member of the Storting from the constituency Hordaland following the 2021 election. She deputised for Sveinung Rotevatn between 1 and 14 October 2021 when he was in government.

== Political positions ==
In January 2022, around the time of Princess Ingrid Alexandra of Norway's 18th birthday, Breivik expressed that the Norwegian monarchy is "outdated" and "undemocratic" and argued that the country eventually should transition into becoming a republic.
