= Helge Rognlien =

Norwegian politician

Minister of Local Government
- In office 29 August 1970 – 17 March 1971
- Prime Minister: Per Borten
- Preceded by: Helge Seip
- Succeeded by: Odvar Nordli

Leader of the Liberal Party
- In office 1972–1974
- Preceded by: Helge Seip
- Succeeded by: Eva Kolstad

Leader of the Young Liberals
- In office 1946–1948
- Preceded by: Aasmund Næs
- Succeeded by: Olaf Kortner

Personal details
- Born: 14 January 1920 Kristiania, Norway
- Died: 15 July 2001 (aged 81)
- Party: Liberal
- Occupation: Politician; Judge

Helge Rognlien (14 January 1920 – 15 July 2001) was a Norwegian politician for the Liberal Party.

He was born in Oslo. At the outbreak of World War II, Rognlien was a student at the University of Oslo. After the German occupation of Norway in 1940, he was a member of the new governing body of the Norwegian Students' Society, which included students from all political groups, except the National Socialists. Rognlien represented the Liberal Student Association. A troubled relationship with the Nazi regime ensued until 15 October 1943, when 63 prominent students were arrested, and Rognlien was one of them. After a time in Bredtveit and Berg concentration camps until 8 December 1943, he spent the rest of the war years in captivity in Sennheim in Alsace and Buchenwald concentration camp in Germany.

Having graduated as cand.jur. in 1945, his career began with a one-year tenure as civil servant in the Ministry of Justice and the Police. From 1946 to 1948 he was the leader of the Young Liberals of Norway, the youth wing of the Liberal Party.

On 29 August 1970 he was appointed Minister of Local Government during the centre-right cabinet Borten, replacing Helge Seip. Rognlien held the position until the cabinet Borten fell in 1971. In 1972 he again replaced Helge Seip, this time as party chairman of the Liberal Party. He held this position until 1974, when Eva Kolstad took over as the first female party leader in Norway.

Rognlien was a member of Bærum municipality council from 1955 to 1960 and 1967 to 1979, and also of Akershus county council from 1963 to 1975. He never served in the national parliament.

He was a member of the Norwegian Nobel Committee from 1966 to 1973. In 1973, the committee decided to award that year's Nobel Peace Prize to Henry Kissinger and Lê Đức Thọ. Rognlien strongly disagreed with this choice, and resigned from the committee in protest, along with fellow committee member Einar Hovdhaugen.

Political offices
Preceded by Helge Seip	Norwegian Minister of Local Government; 1970–1971	Succeeded by Odvar Nordli
Party political offices
Preceded by Aasmund Næs	Chairman of the Young Liberals of Norway; 1946–1948	Succeeded by Olaf Erling Kortner
Preceded by Helge Seip	Chairman of the Liberal Party of Norway; 1972–1974	Succeeded by Eva Kolstad
