= Lars Magnus Moen =

Norwegian politician

Minister of Education and Church Affairs
- In office 28 June 1948 – 9 December 1953
- Prime Minister: Einar Gerhardsen; Oscar Torp
- Preceded by: Kaare Fostervoll
- Succeeded by: Birger Bergersen

Member of the Norwegian Parliament
- In office 1 January 1928 – 31 December 1957
- Constituency: Oppland

Personal details
- Born: Lars Magnus Moen; 29 November 1885 Lesja, Oppland, Sweden-Norway
- Died: 22 April 1964 (aged 78) Dovre, Oppland, Norway
- Party: Labour
- Spouse: Kristine Dieseth (m. 1911)

Lars Magnus Moen (29 November 1885 – 22 April 1964) was a Norwegian politician for the Labour Party who served as Minister of Education and Church Affairs from 1948 to 1953. He also served in the Storting from 1928 to 1957, spanning 30 years.

== Biography ==
Moen was born in 1885 in Lesja Municipality in Oppland, to Tore Ingebrigtsen Moen and Marie Larsdotter Dale. When he was four, the family moved to the square Moen, and it was from here he had his name. After primary and secondary school, Lars traveled to Lillehammer to attend tailoring. It was probably here that he first met the young workers' movement who had come here in connection with the development of the railway.

After some time at Elverum, where Moen found his wife, he came to Dombås as a tailor in 1911. He resided there for the rest of his life. He was central to the construction of labour movements in Gudbrandsdalen, initially as a tenant of the local labour union, and as a tenant of the circuit party in Nord-Gudbrandsdalen. In 1932, he became chairman of the Gudbrandsdalen Labour Party, a position in which he held until 1949.

As minister, he earned a lot of respect, which was gained from his actions of establishing central cultural institutions, such as Riksteatret and Norsk Bygdekino, and his proposal for ninth grade schooling. He resigned as minister after suffering a stroke in 1953, but he remained active in parliament until the end of the 1953–1957 term.

Political offices
Preceded by Kaare Fostervoll	Minister of Education and Church Affairs; 1948–1953	Succeeded by Birger Bergersen
