= Borten cabinet =

Government of Norway from 1965 to 1971

Borten's Cabinet
- Cabinet of Norway

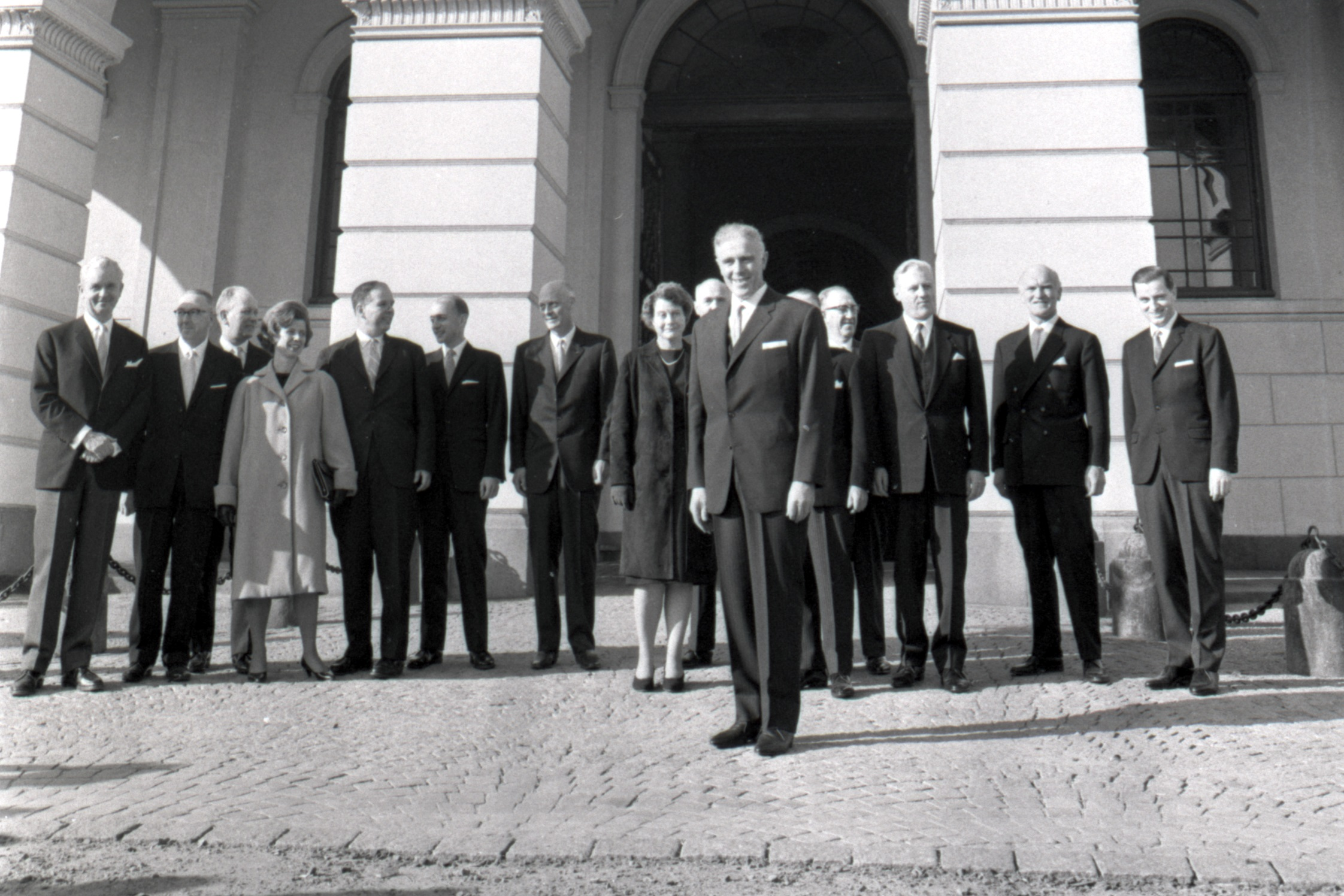
- Prime Minister Borten with his cabinet on 21 October 1965 outside the Royal Palace.
- Date formed: 12 October 1965
- Date dissolved: 17 March 1971

People and organisations
- King: Olav V of Norway
- Prime Minister: Per Borten
- Total no. of members: 15
- Member parties: Centre Party; Conservative Party; Christian Democratic Party; Liberal Party
- Status in legislature: Coalition (majority)

History
- Elections: 1965; 1969
- Legislature terms: 1965–1969; 1969–1973
- Predecessor: Gerhardsen's Fourth Cabinet
- Successor: Bratteli's First Cabinet

Borten's Cabinet governed Norway between 12 October 1965 and 17 March 1971. The cabinet was led by Per Borten and consisted of the Conservative Party, the Centre Party, the Liberal Party and the Christian Democratic Party. It had the following composition:

== Cabinet members ==
Cabinet
Portfolio	Minister	Took office	Left office	Party
Prime Minister	Per Borten	12 October 1965	17 March 1971	Centre
Minister of Foreign Affairs	John Lyng	12 October 1965	22 May 1970	Conservative
Minister of Foreign Affairs	Svenn Stray	22 May 1970	17 March 1971	Conservative
Minister of Defence	Otto Grieg Tidemand	12 October 1965	5 June 1970	Conservative
Minister of Defence	Gunnar Hellesen	5 June 1970	17 March 1971	Conservative
Minister of Industry	Sverre Walter Rostoft	12 October 1965	17 March 1971	Conservative
Minister of Finance and Customs	Ole Myrvoll	12 October 1965	17 March 1971	Liberal
Minister of Pay and Prices	Dagfinn Vårvik	12 October 1965	17 March 1971	Centre
Minister of Local Government and Labour	Helge Seip	12 October 1965	29 August 1970	Liberal
Minister of Local Government and Labour	Helge Rognlien	29 August 1970	17 March 1971	Liberal
Minister of Social Affairs	Egil Aarvik	12 October 1965	17 March 1971	Christian Democratic
Minister of Transport and Communications	Håkon Kyllingmark	12 October 1965	17 March 1971	Conservative
Minister of Trade and Shipping	Kåre Willoch	12 October 1965	5 June 1970	Conservative
Minister of Trade and Shipping	Otto Grieg Tidemand	5 June 1970	17 March 1971	Conservative
Minister of Fisheries	Oddmund Myklebust	12 October 1965	8 November 1968	Centre
Minister of Fisheries	Einar Moxnes	8 November 1968	17 March 1971	Centre
Minister of Agriculture	Bjarne Lyngstad	12 October 1965	21 August 1970	Liberal
Minister of Agriculture	Hallvard Eika	21 August 1970	17 March 1971	Liberal
Minister of Justice and the Police	Elisabeth Schweigaard Selmer	12 October 1965	3 October 1970	Conservative
Minister of Justice and the Police	Egil Endresen	3 October 1970	17 March 1971	Conservative
Minister of Family and Consumer Affairs	Elsa Skjerven	12 October 1965	17 March 1971	Christian Democratic
Minister of Education and Church Affairs	Kjell Bondevik	12 October 1965	17 March 1971	Christian Democratic

== State Secretaries ==
Ministry	State Secretary	Period (Note: Unless otherwise noted, the period was from 12 October 1965 to 17 March 1971.)	Party
Office of the Prime Minister	Odd Bye	29 October 1965 –	Centre
Office of the Prime Minister	Emil Vindsetmo	26 January 1966 –	Independent
Ministry of Foreign Affairs	Frithjof Jacobsen	8 February 1966 – 23 May 1970	Conservative
Ministry of Foreign Affairs	Kjell Colding	13 June 1970 –	Conservative
Ministry of Finance and Customs	Magne Lerheim	14 February 1966 – 30 April 1967	Liberal
Ministry of Finance and Customs	Jon Ola Norbom	13 February 1967 – 16 October 1969	Liberal
Ministry of Finance and Customs	Leiv Magnus Vidvei	20 February 1970 –	Liberal
Ministry of Defence	Arne Gunnar Lund	15 October 1965 – 1 October 1968	Conservative
Ministry of Defence	Thor Knudsen	26 January 1970 – 31 January 1971	Conservative
Ministry of Defence	Jan Tore Odegard	25 January 1971 –	Conservative
Ministry of Industry	Sigmund Kjos	25 October 1965 – 30 June 1970	Conservative
Ministry of Industry	Sverre Kongshavn	1 April 1970 –	Conservative
Ministry of Local Government and Labour	Torstein Slungård	12 November 1965 – 19 August 1969; 4 October 1969 –	Liberal
Ministry of Social Affairs	Kåre Kristiansen	15 October 1965 – 31 December 1968	Christian Democratic
Ministry of Social Affairs	Per Høybråten	1 November 1968 –	Christian Democratic
Ministry of Transport and Communications	Henrik Johan Lisæth	13 November 1965 – 28 September 1966	Conservative
Ministry of Transport and Communications	Ola Thorleif Ruud	15 November 1966 – 31 July 1969; 29 October 1969 –	Conservative
Ministry of Trade and Shipping	Kjell Hanssen	17 November 1969 –	Conservative
Ministry of Fisheries	Ottar Fjærvoll	1 July 1966 – 31 May 1968	Centre
Ministry of Fisheries	Knut Vartdal	15 July 1968 –	Centre
Ministry of Agriculture	Hans Kristian Seip	22 August 1966 – 30 June 1967	Liberal
Ministry of Agriculture	Johan Kleppe	1 January 1968 – 31 July 1969	Liberal
Ministry of Agriculture	Per E. Vale	8 December 1969 –	Liberal
Ministry of Justice and Police	Jan P. Syse	1 November 1970 –	Conservative
Ministry of Church Affairs and Education	Henrik Bargem	25 October 1965 – 15 October 1969	Christian Democratic
Ministry of Church Affairs and Education	Arnfinn Sørensen	11 November 1969 –	Christian Democratic
