= Helge Seip =

Norwegian politician

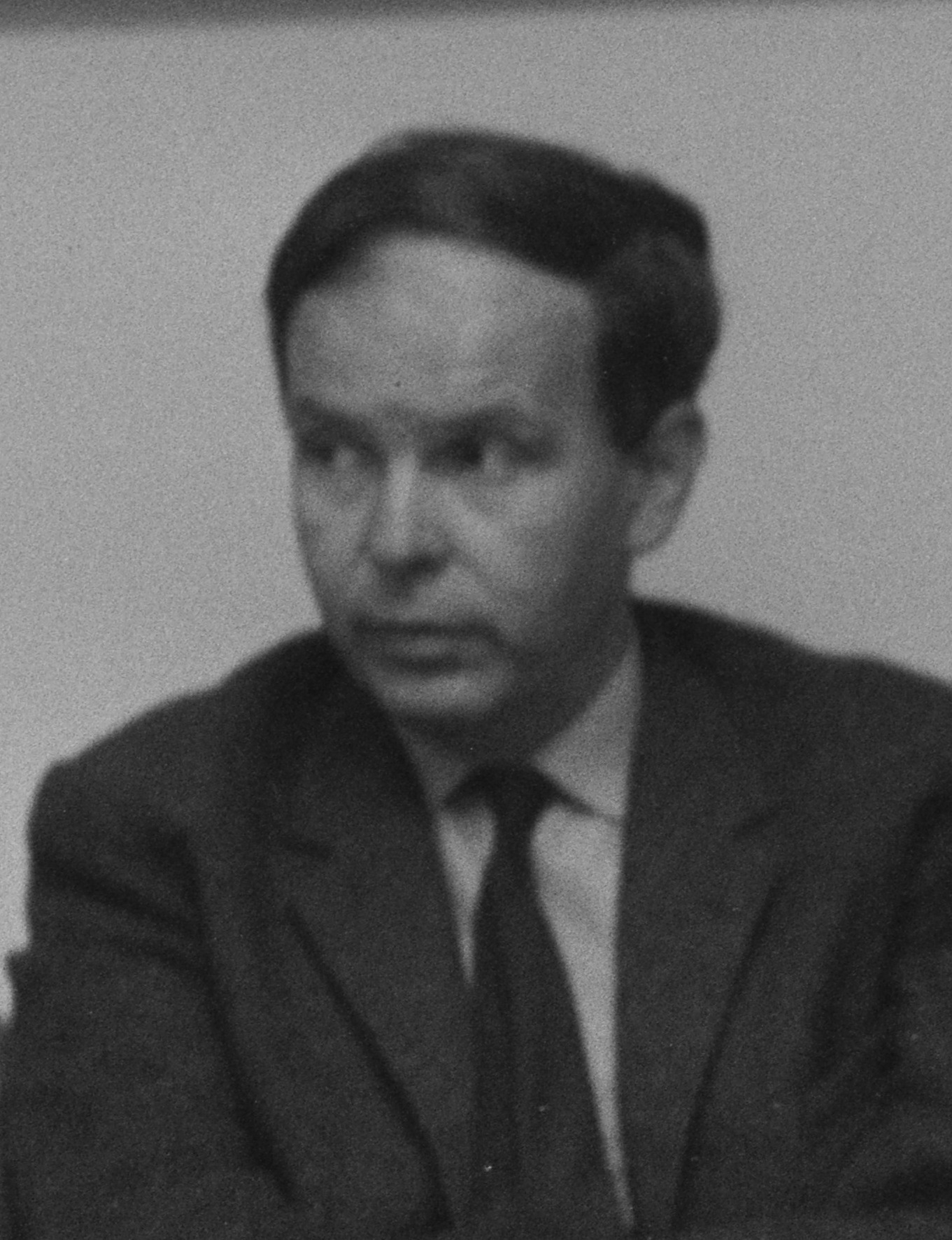
- Seip in 1963.

Minister of Local Government
- In office 12 October 1965 – 29 August 1970
- Prime Minister: Per Borten
- Preceded by: Jens Haugland
- Succeeded by: Helge Rognlien

Member of the Norwegian Parliament
- In office 1 January 1954 – 30 September 1961
- Constituency: Oslo
- In office 1 October 1965 – 30 September 1973
- Constituency: Oslo

Leader of the Liberal People's Party
- In office 1972–1973
- Preceded by: Position established
- Succeeded by: Magne Lerheim

Leader of the Liberal Party
- In office 1970–1972
- Preceded by: Gunnar Garbo
- Succeeded by: Helge Rognlien

Personal details
- Born: Helge Lunde Seip; 5 March 1919 Surnadal Municipality, Møre og Romsdal, Norway
- Died: 29 January 2004 (aged 84) Bærum Municipality, Akershus, Norway
- Party: Liberal People's; Liberal
- Spouse: Therese Holth (m. 1943)
- Relatives: Martin Fredrik Seip (brother)

Helge Lunde Seip (5 March 1919 – 29 January 2004) was a Norwegian politician for the Liberal Party and later the Liberal People's Party.

He was born in Surnadal Municipality. At a young age he became involved in the Young Liberals, the youth wing of the Liberal Party. In the local chapter of Oslo he was a member of the board from 1937 to 1939, and deputy chairman from 1939 to 1945. From 1945 to 1947 he was a board member of their national organization. In 1948 he became a deputy member of the Liberal Party national board, advancing to a regular board member in 1952. He continued in this position, becoming national party leader in 1970.

He was elected to the Parliament of Norway from Oslo in 1953, and was re-elected on three occasions in 1957, 1965 and 1969. In between he headed the Liberal ballot in the 1961 election, but the Liberals had no MPs elected. In 1965 he was appointed Minister of Local Government in the centre-right Borten's Cabinet. He left in 1970, and was replaced by Helge Rognlien.

During his fifth term as parliament member, in December 1972, Seip joined the Liberal People's Party which split from the Liberal Party over disagreements of Norway's proposed entry to the European Economic Community. He was again succeeded by Helge Rognlien, this time as party leader of the Liberal Party. Instead, Seip became the first leader of the Liberal People's Party. However, Seip was not re-elected to parliament in 1973, thus disappearing from national politics.

On the local level Seip was a member of Oslo city council from 1945 to 1947, and later of the municipal council of Bærum Municipality from 1951 to 1967, serving as deputy mayor from 1951 to 1955, and later another tenure from 1979 to 1991.

Outside politics, Seip graduated from the University of Oslo as cand.oecon. in 1941 and cand.jur. in 1942. Among his jobs before becoming a cabinet member were consultant in the Ministry of Finance from 1946 to 1948, lecturer at the University of Oslo from 1947 to 1955, assistant secretary in the Ministry of Trade from 1948 to 1952, the same position at Statistics Norway from 1952 to 1954 and political chief editor in the newspaper Dagbladet from 1954 to 1965. In 1951 the idea of appointing Seip as a State Secretary in the Ministry of Finance was discussed, but it did not happen.

He was secretary general of the Nordic Council from 1973 to 1977, and editor-in-chief of Norges Handels- og Sjøfartstidende (renamed Dagens Næringsliv in 1987) from 1977 to 1980. In 1980 he was appointed director of the newly created Norwegian Data Inspectorate. He left in 1989 to become Data Protection Commissioner for the Council of Europe, a position he held until his retirement in 1995.

His brother Martin Fredrik Seip was a noted physician and professor of medicine.

Political offices
Preceded by Jens Haugland	Norwegian Minister of Local Government; 1965–1970	Succeeded by Helge Rognlien
Party political offices
Preceded by Gunnar Garbo	Leader of the Liberal Party; 1970–1972	Succeeded by Helge Rognlien
New post	Leader of the Liberal People's Party; 1972–1973	Succeeded by Magne Lerheim
Diplomatic posts
Preceded by Emil Vindsetmoe	Secretary-General of the Nordic Council; 1973–1977	Succeeded by Gudmund Saxrud
Media offices
Preceded by Einar Skavlan	Chief editor of Dagbladet; 1954–1965 (joint with Gunnar Larsen 1954–1958, Roald Storsletten 1959–1965)	Succeeded by Roald Storsletten
Preceded by Terje Baalsrud	Chief editor of Dagens Næringsliv; 1977–1980	Succeeded by Arne Hartmark
Cultural offices
Preceded by Reidar Carlsen	Chairman of Foreningen Norden in Norway; 1981–1987	Succeeded by Reidar Østgård
Civic offices
New post	Director of the Data Inspectorate; 1980–1989	Succeeded by Georg Apenes
