= Lars-Jacob Krogh =

Lars-Jacob Krogh (26 September 1938 – 14 April 2010) was a Norwegian anchorman and television presenter.

== Biography ==
He was born at Nes in Akershus, Norway. Krogh studied at the University of Oslo in 1958-63. He earned his Master's degree in English language and literature after studying at Wadham College, University of Oxford which he attended under a Norwegian Oxford scholarship from 1960-61. He attended the College of Europe at Bruges 1964-1965 (Robert Schuman promotion).

Krogh started working for the Norwegian Broadcasting Corporation (NRK) in 1965, where he covered, among other things, the European Community membership referendum in 1972. Krogh worked for TVNorge in the period 1994-96. Back in NRK he was one year in NRK Sport in 1997 before he was back in the news department. From 2003 he was the editor of Radio Kongsvinger. In 2008 he received The King's Medal of Merit (Kongens fortjenstmedalje) in gold.

Krogh died from amyotrophic lateral sclerosis. Krogh was diagnosed with Lyme disease in the fall of 2009, but this was based on a test that was not scientifically validated.
