= Kaare Fostervoll =

Norwegian politician

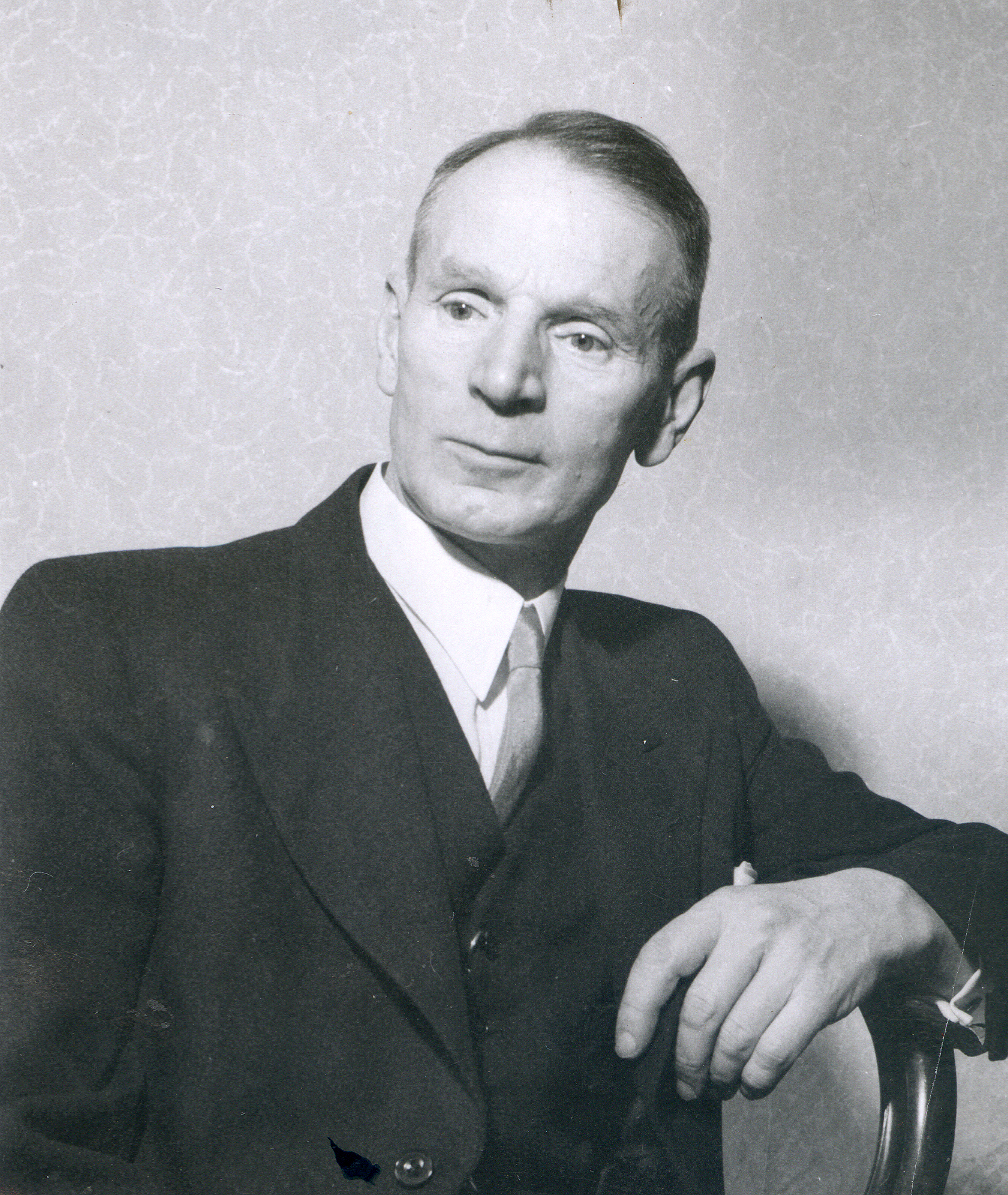
- Kaare Fostervoll, politician and director-general of the Norwegian Broadcasting Corporation

Director-General of the Norwegian Broadcasting Corporation
- In office 1948–1962
- Preceded by: Knut Tvedt
- Succeeded by: Hans Jacob Ustvedt

Minister of Education and Church Affairs
- In office 25 June 1945 – 28 June 1948
- Prime Minister: Einar Gerhardsen
- Preceded by: Nils Hjelmtveit
- Succeeded by: Lars Moen

Personal details
- Born: 3 December 1891 Kristiansund, Møre og Romsdal, Sweden-Norway
- Died: 6 July 1981 (aged 89) Oslo, Norway
- Party: Labour
- Spouse: Herbjørg Rannei Torjuul (m. 1928)

Kaare Fostervoll (3 December 1891 – 6 July 1981) was a Norwegian educator and politician for the Labour Party. From 1949 to 1962 he was the director-general of the Norwegian Broadcasting Corporation (NRK).

== Early career ==
He was born in Kristiansund as a son of school manager Kristen Fostervoll (1856–1920) and Anna Karoline Kvande (1863–1941). He took the examen artium in 1910, graduated from Volda Teacher's College in 1912, and worked as a teacher at various schools from 1912 to 1927. In 1927 he got the cand.philol. degree, and in the same year he became principal of Firda Upper Secondary School, a position he held until 1938 when he got the same position in Ålesund. At Firda he was Norway's youngest principal.

While studying he was chairman of Studentmållaget from 1919 to 1920 and the Norwegian Students' Society in 1923. He became chairman of the Students' Society because of a coalition with Mot Dag. He later denounced Mot Dag's revolutionary tendencies, but remained an anti-militarist, opposing NATO in the 1940s. Becoming involved in politics in the 1920s, he was a secretary of the Socialist Youth League of Norway from 1923 to 1925, and vice chairman from 1925 to 1927. In the same year, this youth wing of the Social Democratic Labour Party ceased to exist because the party was incorporated into the Norwegian Labour Party. Fostervoll was later a board member of Noregs Mållag from 1931 to 1932 before returning to politics as local chapter leader of the Labour Party in Gloppen from 1934 to 1938. In the same period he was secretary for the county chapter.

During the occupation of Norway by Nazi Germany, Fostervoll was fired as principal by Nazi authorities in 1941. His family retreated to a small farm which the family possessed, and lived here until 1945.

== Politics and broadcasting ==
After the Second World War, Fostervoll was drafted into Gerhardsen's First Cabinet as Minister of Education and Church Affairs. He remained so in Gerhardsen's Second Cabinet, but left in 1948. He had been elected to the Parliament of Norway for the Market towns of Møre og Romsdal county in the 1945 election, and while Gottfred Hoem had taken his seat while he was a cabinet minister, Fostervoll now assumed his seat in Parliament and chaired the Standing Committee on Education and Church Affairs for the rest of the term. During his time as a Minister, some important reforms went through, including the foundation of the Norwegian State Educational Loan Fund and the University of Bergen.

He was not re-elected, as he had been hired as Director-General of the Norwegian Broadcasting Corporation in competition with Toralv Øksnevad. He served in this job from 1948 to 1962, the major achievement being the introduction of television in Norway (experimental broadcasts from 1954 and full service from 1960). He was a co-founder of the European Broadcasting Union, and represented Norway in the organization. He was also a board member of Foreningen Norden from 1949 to 1962 and of the Nansen Foundation from 1930 to 1962. As a pensioner he released two books; Mot rikare mål. Den norske folkehøgskulen 1864–1964 in 1964 and Norges sosialdemokratiske Arbeiderparti 1921–1927 in 1969.

In December 1928 he had married telegrapher Herbjørg Rannei Torjuul (1902–1996). They had the daughter Kari Fostervoll (1930–2006) who married sculptor Fritz Røed. Kaare Fostervoll died in July 1981 in Oslo.

Political offices
Preceded by Nils Hjelmtveit	Minister of Education and Church Affairs; 1945–1948	Succeeded by Lars Magnus Moen
Media offices
Preceded by Olav Midttun	Director-General of the Norwegian Broadcasting Corporation; 1948–1962	Succeeded by Hans Jacob Ustvedt
