= Halle Jørn Hanssen =

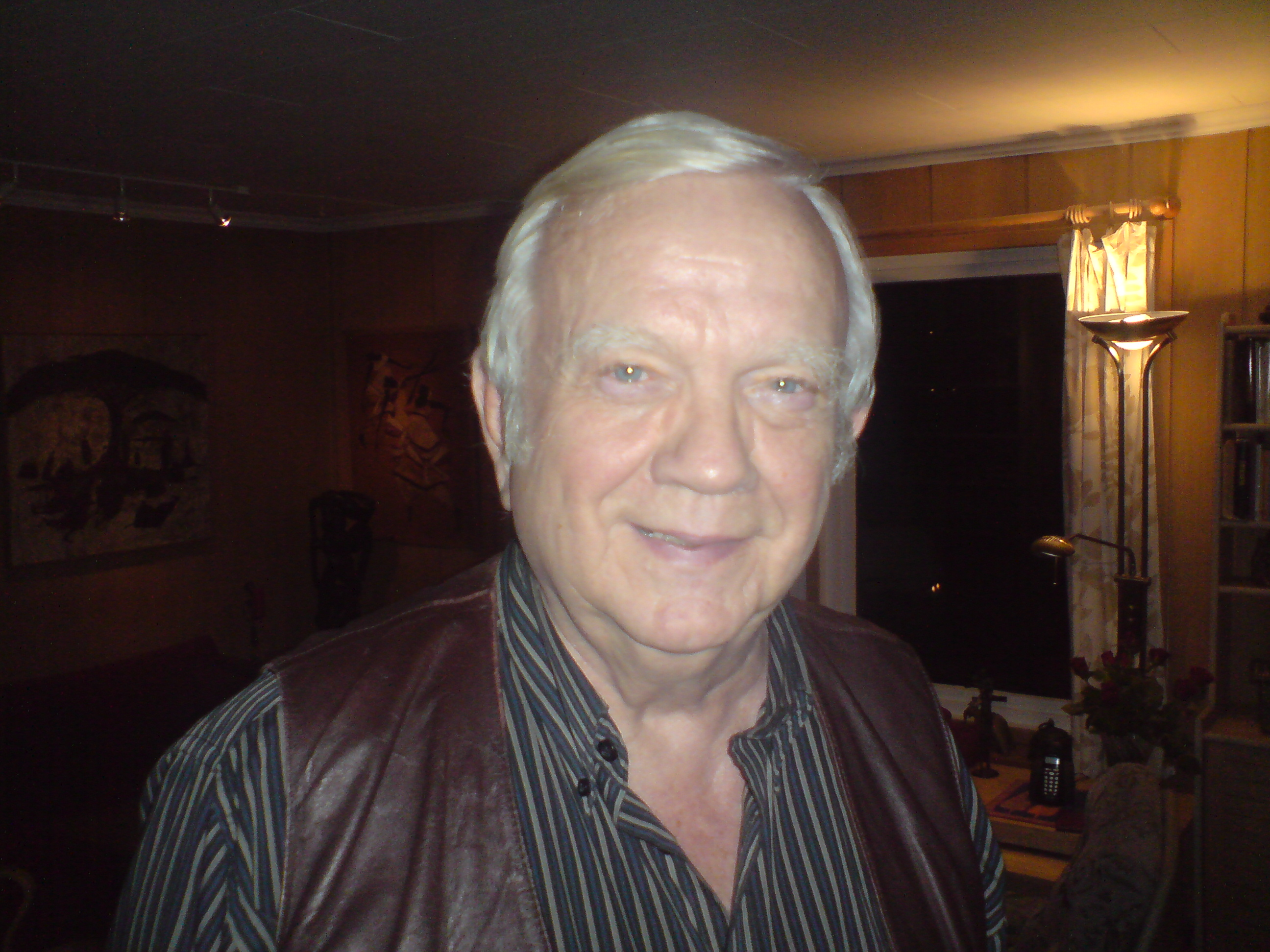
Halle Jørn Hanssen, 2007

Halle Jørn Hanssen (born 18 February 1937) is a Norwegian television correspondent, development aid administrator and politician.

He was born in Brønnøy Municipality, and worked as a teacher in Vinje Municipality before enrolling at the University of Oslo. He graduated with the cand.mag. degree in 1964, and worked as a researcher at the Norwegian Institute of International Affairs from 1965 up to and including 1968. Having been the chairman of the Young Liberals of Norway from 1964 to 1966, in early 1969 he was hired as secretary for the Liberal Party. Immediately after the 1969 election he was hired in the Norwegian Broadcasting Corporation. In 1978 he became the first correspondent for Africa in the Norwegian Broadcasting Corporation, which was the only television station in Norway at that time. As a correspondent he was stationed in Nairobi.

Hanssen left the Liberal Party in 1972, as the party split over disagreements of Norway's proposed entry to the European Economic Community. He joined the Labour Party instead, and served three terms as a local politician on the municipal council for Bærum Municipality.

In 1982 he left his job in the Norwegian Broadcasting Corporation, and was hired in the Norwegian Agency for Development Cooperation. In 1992 he was hired in the Norwegian People's Aid, becoming secretary general in 1994. He left in 2001, and has since worked as a freelance writer, lecturer and advisor. Among other topics, he has advised the Norwegian People's Aid about democracy building in Sudan.

Hanssen has also been involved in Inter Press Service, Eurostep, the Panos Network, Attac Norway and the Norwegian Forum for Environment and Development. He resides at Høvik.

Party political offices
Preceded by Olav Myklebust	Chairman of the Young Liberals of Norway; 1964–1966	Succeeded by Ola H. Metliaas
