= Torstein Slungård =

Norwegian politician

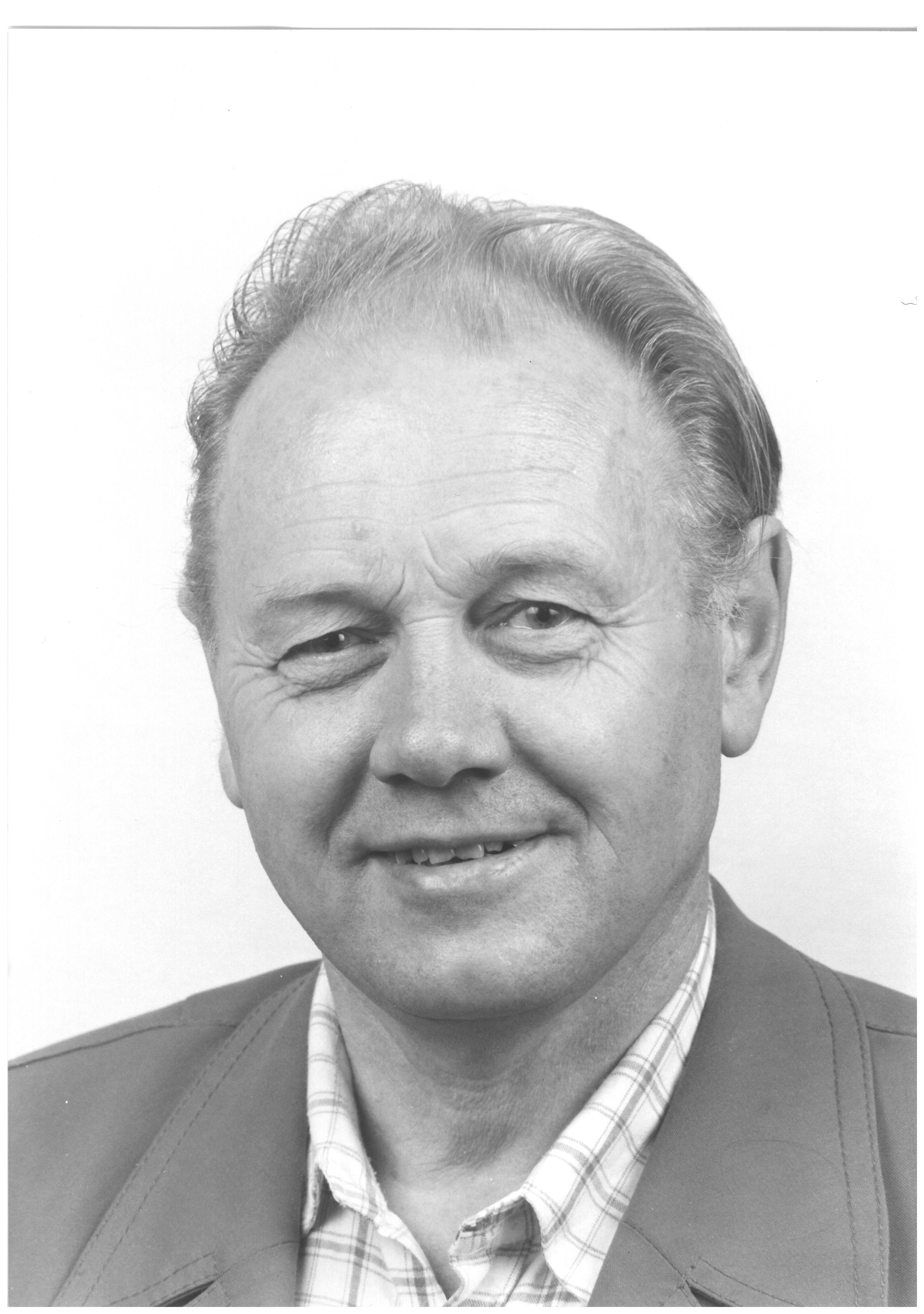
Torstein Slungård

Torstein Slungård (5 September 1931 – 14 August 2009) was a Norwegian politician from the Liberal Party.

He was appointed State Secretary in the Ministry of Local Government and Labour from 1965 to August 1969 and October 1969 to 1971, during the cabinet Borten. The hiatus came because he ran for general election in 1969, and incumbent State Secretaries are not eligible for election per the Norwegian Constitution. He did not win a seat in the election, but served as a deputy representative in the Norwegian Parliament from Akershus during the terms 1965–1969 and 1969–1973.

He was a member of the municipal council of Nittedal Municipality for seven terms (28 years) and serving as mayor there from 1976 to 1977,. He was also a member of the Akershus county council and chairman of the regional party chapter. He was also deputy chairman of the national party.

He was board chairman of the Norwegian Institute for Urban and Regional Research, Akershus Energi and Fylkeskraft Østlandet, and a board member of the Norwegian Association of Local and Regional Authorities. He lived his later life in Dovre Municipality, and died in 2009.
