= Per Torsvik =

Norwegian political scientist and media scholar

Per Torsvik (30 November 1925 – 1998) was a Norwegian political scientist and media scholar.

He held the mag.art. degree in political science, but is better known for founding media research in Norway. In 1958 he co-founded the Department of Press Research at the University of Oslo, and was the only employee for many years. He was later hired at the University of Bergen, at a "secretariat for media research" which was founded following a 1968 report written by Torsvik, Stein Rokkan and Leif Holbæk-Hanssen. The three wrote the book Medieforskning in 1972, and Torsvik also co-wrote a chapter in Rokkan's 1970 book Citizens, Elections, Parties and a chapter in the 1968 book Det norske samfunn. In 1978 Torsvik was promoted to docent in communication, and later promoted to professor.
