= Young Liberals of Norway =

Youth wing of the Liberal Party

Young Liberals of Norway Norges Unge Venstre (NUV)
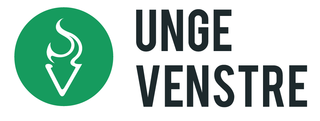
- Leader: Omar Svendsen-Yagci
- Vice President: Tejn Rolland and Emma Strandbakke
- Secretary General: Dina Bovim
- Headquarters: Møllergata 16; 0179 Oslo
- Membership: ▲1,437 (2017)
- Ideology: Liberalism
- Mother party: Venstre
- International affiliation: International Federation of Liberal Youth (IFLRY)
- European affiliation: European Liberal Youth (LYMEC)
- Nordic affiliation: Association of Young Nordic Social Liberals (SNUS)
- Website: www.ungevenstre.no

Young Liberals of Norway (Norwegian: Unge Venstre) (NUV) is the youth league of the Norwegian political party Venstre. Young Liberals was founded on 27 January 1909, with Anders Kirkhusmo as the first leader. The current president is Omar Svendsen-Yagci, since 2024. Vice presidents are Tejn Rolland and Emma Strandbakke, and the International Officer is Hans Fredrik Jacobsen. It advocates a more liberal version of the mother party's social liberal ideology.

Young Liberals of Norway is a member of the international liberal youth organizations:

- European Liberal Youth (LYMEC)
- International Federation of Liberal Youth (IFLRY)

== Name ==
The Norwegian name 'Unge Venstre' has historical reasons, and although it literally translates as 'Young Left' in English, Young Liberals of Norway are not socialists, but in fact liberals. To avoid confusion, the official English-language name of the party is 'Young Liberals of Norway'. Proposals to change the name of Unge Venstre to 'Liberal Ungdom' ('Liberal Youth') have been defeated in successive congresses.

== Policies of Young Liberals of Norway ==
- The Young Liberals are strongly in favour of fighting climate change, calling it "the greatest threat of our time" on their website. As a result, the Young Liberals are in favour of helping renewable energy become competitive through subsidies, but believe that the market rather than politicians should determine which technology is best. The Young Liberals oppose the construction gas power stations without Carbon capture and storage, and opposes subsidies for polluting industries. The Young Liberals are also in favour of other types of environmental protection, such as hindering oil exploration of the coast of Lofoten due to the fragility of the environment.
- The Young Liberals are in favour of free trade, especially the removal of tariffs on the products of developing nations. This is seen as an integral part of achieving global economic justice rather than a threat to it.
- The Young Liberals are arguably the most pro-immigration political group in Norway, and advocate free labour immigration. The Young Liberals supports compulsory classes in Norwegian as a prerequisite for gaining citizenship.
- The Young Liberals are in favour of Norwegian membership in the European Union, and criticise the European Economic Area agreement as undemocratic because Norway is not represented when decisions regarding it are taken.
- The Young Liberals have recently become especially prominent in the debate on drug policy, and is advocating harm reduction policies. It is calling for legalization and regulation of all drugs. The youth party also advocates administration of clean heroin to drug addicts who have not succeeded in other means of rehabilitation. Furthermore, the party stresses that more resources must be spent on rehabilitation, health care and follow-ups for both previous and existing drug addicts.
- The Young Liberals of Norway defines itself as inclusive feminist and supports LGBT+ rights. It was among the signatories of a 2025 call for an inclusive feminism with nearly 30 organizations, including the Liberal Party's women's network.

== Relationship with Venstre ==
Young Liberals of Norway are independent of Venstre but co-operates closely with them, for example the leader of Young Liberals is automatically a member of the central governing body (Sentralstyret) of Venstre. Venstre and Young Liberals have different opinions on some matters, most prominently in that Young Liberals of Norway supports Norwegian entry into the European Union while Venstre opposes this. The Young Liberals of Norway failed to make Venstre pro-EU during Venstre's party congress in April 2009.

The Young Liberals are generally more liberal in their views than the mother party, both on social and economic issues. They aim to influence Venstre views so that they accords more with those of the Young Liberals. Notable recent victories include convincing Venstre to support heroin prescription in the treatment of addiction, to consider drug decriminalization and to support intellectual property reform.

== Organisation ==
Young Liberals of Norway is organized into 19 regional branches, with local clubs in about 50 municipalities. The highest decision-making body of the organisation is the yearly national congress. Between the national congresses, the organisation is governed by a national board and an executive board.

The executive board members of the Norwegian Young Liberals are:

- Omar Svendsen-Yagci (President)
- Tejn Rolland (1. Vice President)
- Emma Strandbakke (2. Vice President)
- Hanna Bakkelund
- Petra Engelien
- Iver Flyum-Bjørlo
- Thyra Håkonsløkken
- Sondre Undheim Lokøy
- Eric Monsen
- Brage Kåsa Skarstein
- Hans Fredrik Jacobsen

Secretary:

- Dina Bovim (secretary general)
- Daniel Wessel Grindflek

== Leaders of Young Liberals of Norway ==
- 2024- Omar Svendsen-Yagci
- 2021-2024 Ane Breivik
- 2017–2021 Sondre Hansmark
- 2013–2017 Tord Hustveit
- 2010–2013 Sveinung Rotevatn
- 2007–2010 Anne Solsvik
- 2003–2007 Lars-Henrik Michelsen
- 2001–2003 Monica Tjelmeland
- 1998–2001 Jennie Johnsen
- 1997–1998 Sverre Molandsveen
- 1994–1997 Helge Solum Larsen
- 1992–1994 Per Tore Woie
- 1990–1992 Gunn-Vivian Eide
- 1988–1990 Atle Hamar
- 1986–1988 Guro Fjellanger
- 1985–1986 Hege Berg-Nielsen
- 1983–1985 Erling Moe
- 1981–1983 Jesper W. Simonsen
- 1980–1981 Øystein Heggen
- 1979–1980 Torgeir Anda
- 1976–1979 Olav Ljøsne
- 1975–1976 Ottar Grepstad
- 1975–1976 Jørn Rattsø
- 1972–1974 Carl Johan Sverdrup
- 1970–1972 Odd Einar Dørum
- 1968–1970 Kjell G. Rosland
- 1966–1968 Ola H. Metliaas
- 1964–1966 Halle Jørn Hanssen
- 1962–1964 Olav Myklebust
- 1960–1962 Magne Lerheim
- 1956–1960 Odd Grande
- 1955–1956 Ragnar Sem (during Skjønsberg's stay abroad)
- 1952–1956 Simen Skjønsberg
- 1950–1952 Jon Ola Norbom
- 1950 Helge Røed (during Kortner's stay abroad)
- 1948–1950 Olaf Kortner
- 1946–1948 Helge Rognlien
- 1934–1946 Aasmund Næs
- 1930–1934 Johannes Teigland
- 1926–1930 Anton Laurin
- 1920–1926 Olav Gullvåg
- 1916–1920 Torkell Løvland
- 1914–1916 Toralv Øksnevad
- 1912–1914 Hans Hope
- 1909–1912 Anders L. Kirkhusmo
