= Gjestvang =

Gjestvang is a Norwegian surname. Notable people with the surname include:

- Alv Gjestvang (1937−2016), Norwegian speed skater
- Per Gjestvang (1915–2002), Norwegian veterinarian, resistance member, military officer, and politician
