= Andelva =

River in Norway

Coordinates: 60°19′N 11°16′E

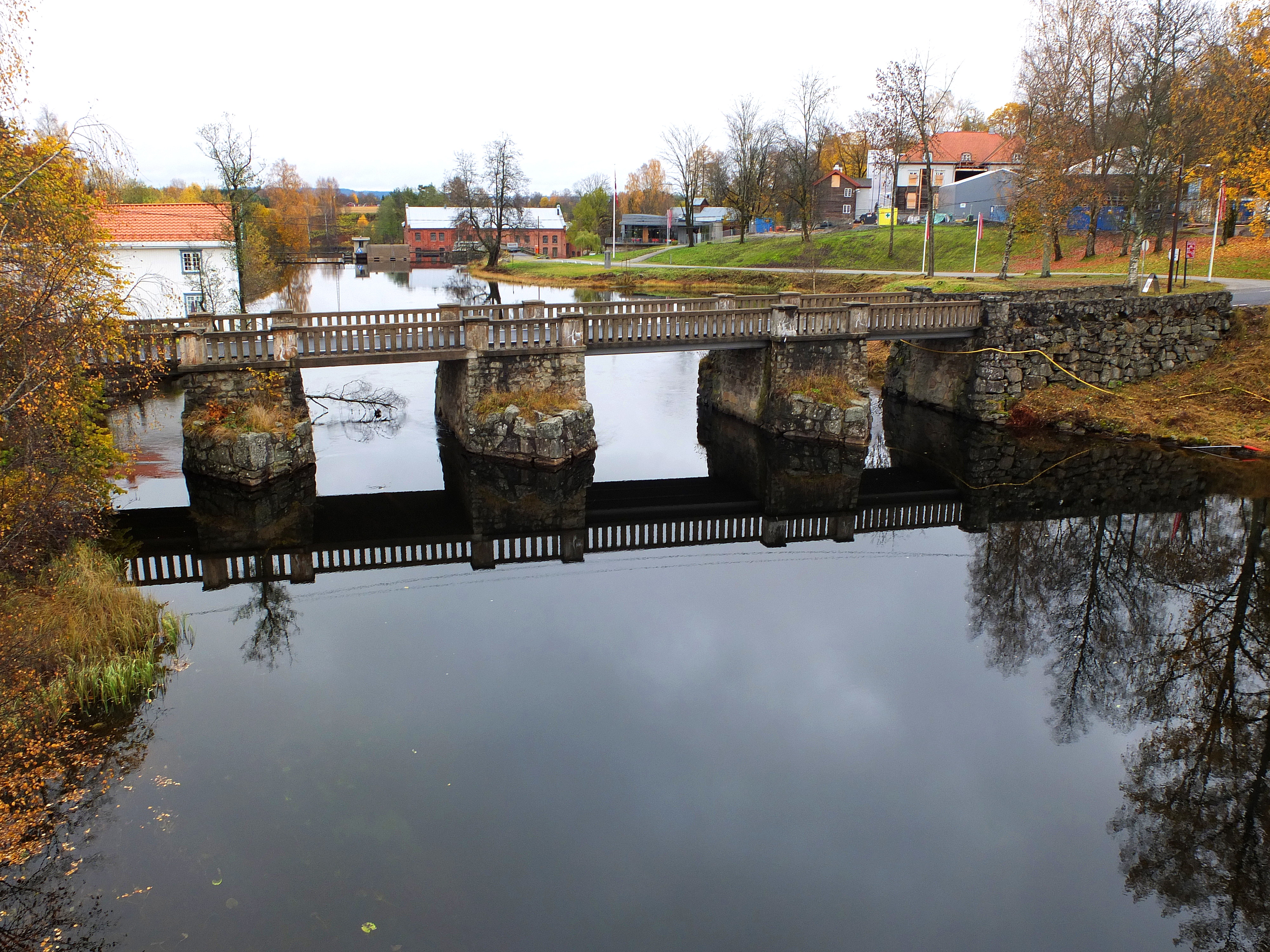
The bridge over the Andelva on County Road 506 at Eidsvoll Verk

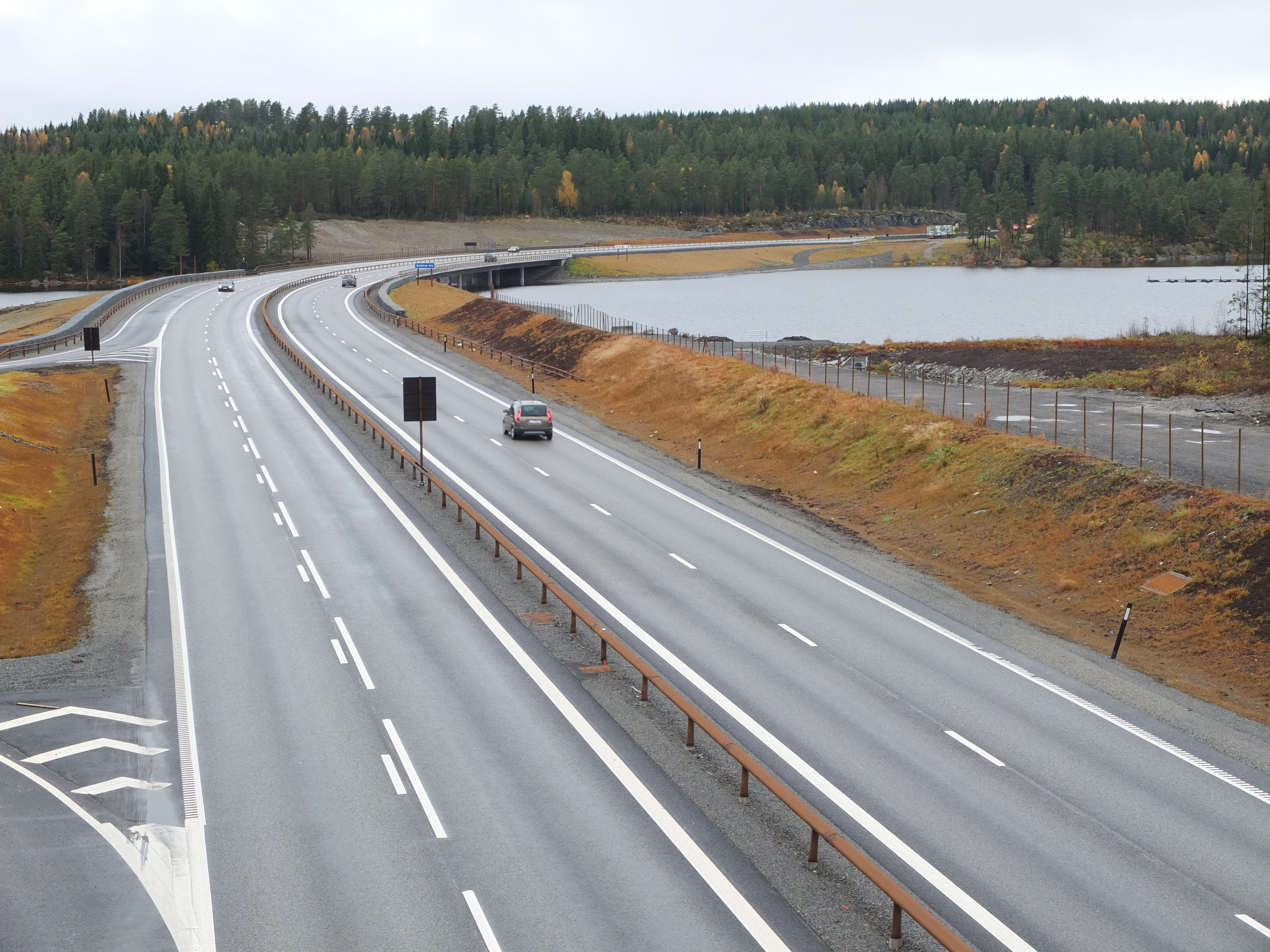
The E6 crosses the Andelva just after the river starts at Hurdalssjøen

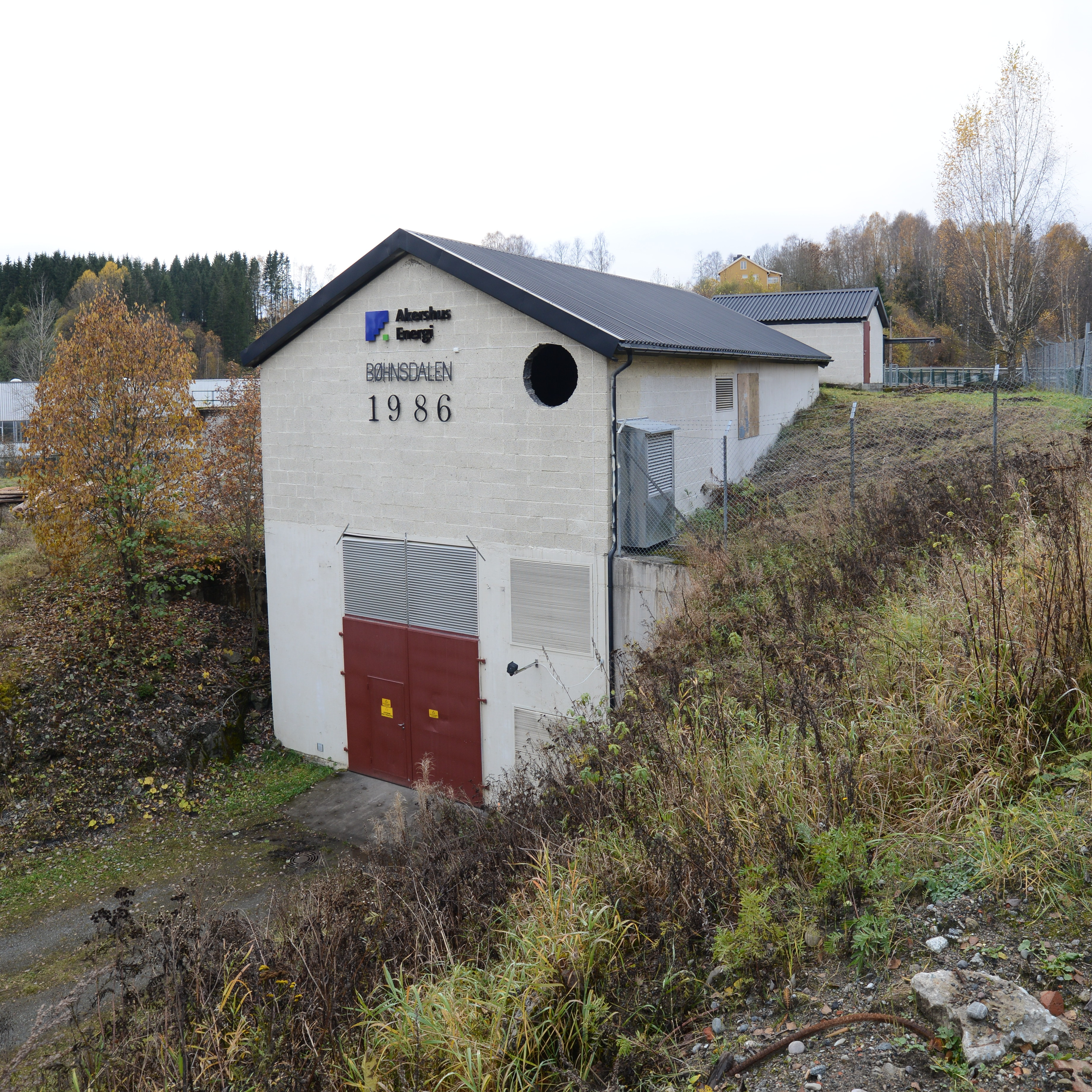
Bønsdalen hydroelectric power plant on the Andelva

The Andelva is a 15-kilometre (9 mi) river that runs through Eidsvoll, Norway. It flows from the lake Hurdalssjøen at Eidsvoll Verk to the river Vorma in the town center of Eidsvoll.

There are fifteen fish species registered in the river, with good fishing possibilities. The river is protected from 15 September to 1 May.
