= Vorma =

River in Norway

Coordinates: 60°08′40″N 11°27′45″E

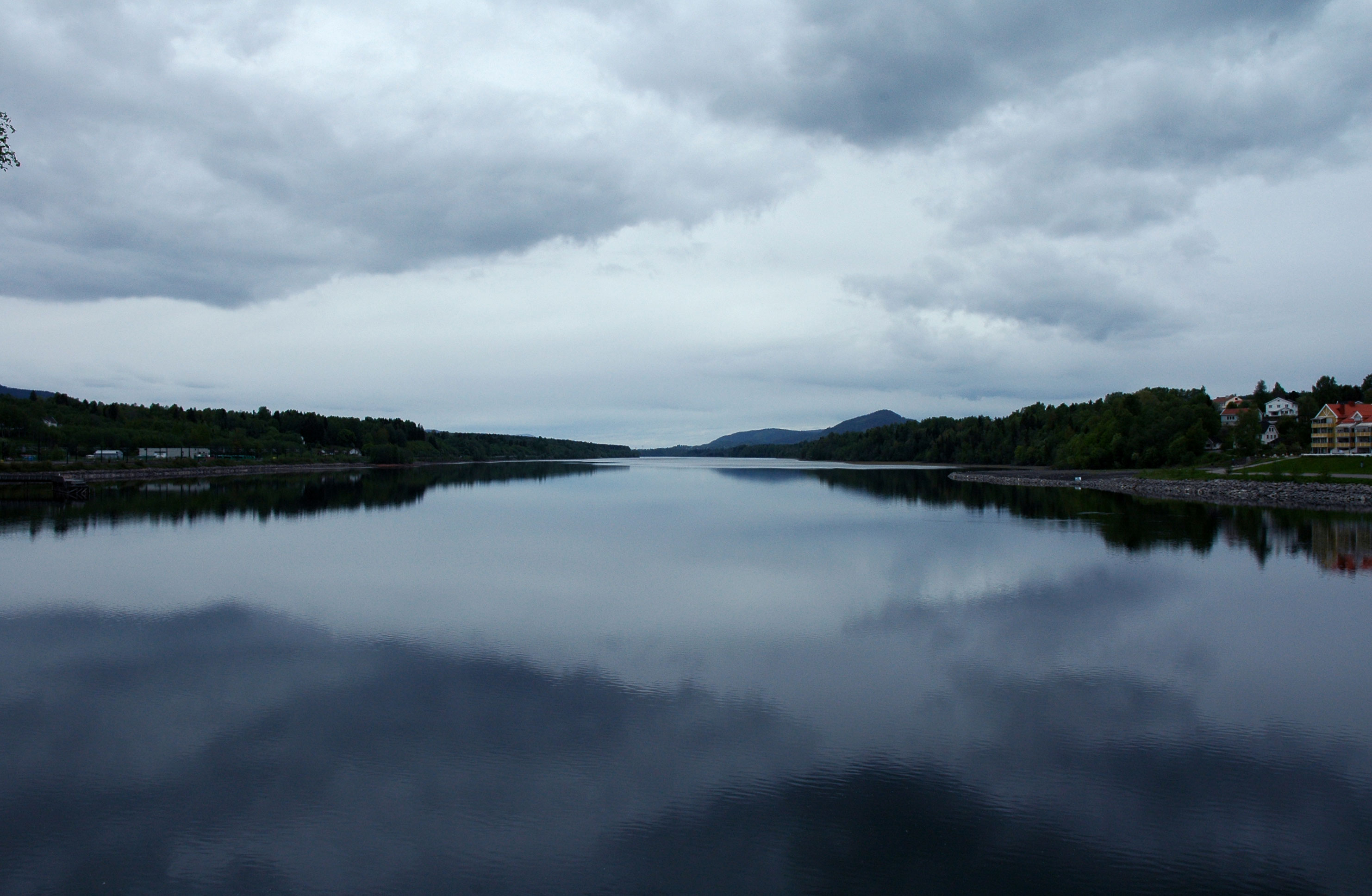
- The Vorma from the Eidsvoll train station looking north

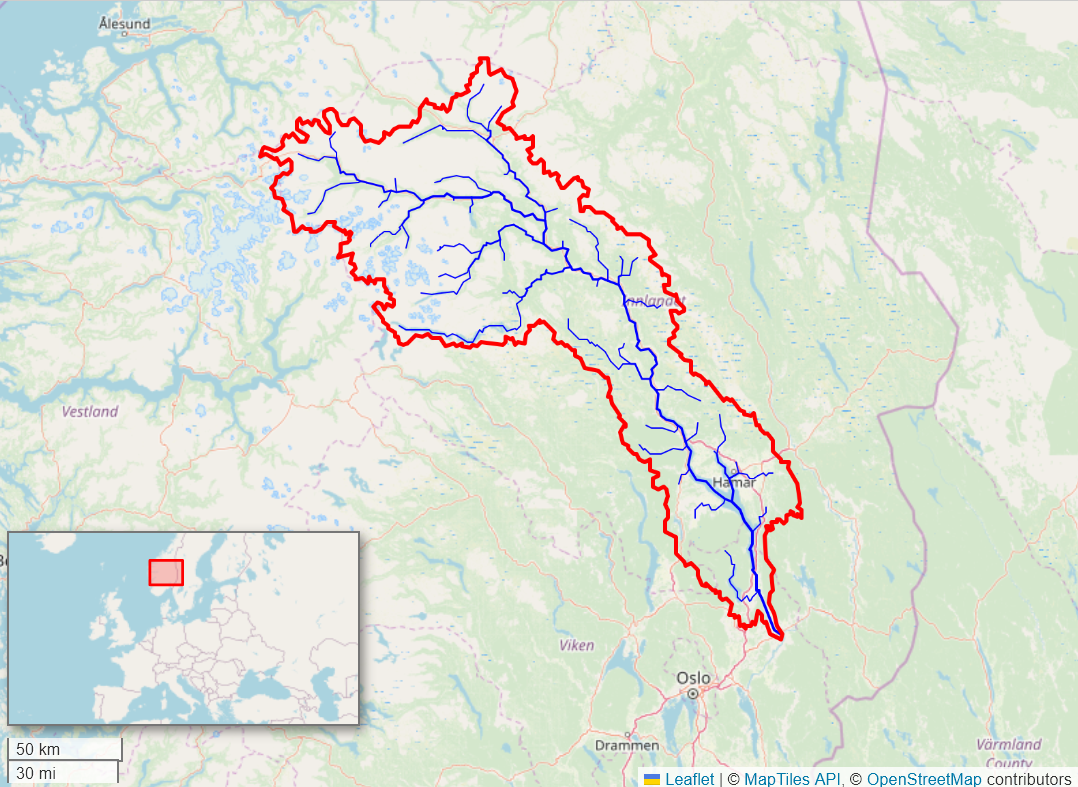
- Map of the Vorma River watershed

Location
- Country: Norway

Physical characteristics
- Source
  - location: Mjøsa
- Mouth
  - location: Glomma, Årnes
- Length: 30 km (19 mi)
- Basin size: 17,000 km^{2}

The Vorma is a river in Norway that brings water from lake Mjøsa into the Glomma river. The Vorma is 30 kilometres (19 mi) long and flows through the town of Eidsvoll. The Vorma flows from Lake Mjøsa at the village of Minnesund to join with the Glomma just north of Årnes.

Vorma was so named because it was a "warm" river that never froze over, while both the Glomma and the Gudbrandsdalslågen routinely freeze in the winter. The junction of the Vorma with the Glomma at Årnes and Nes is the site of the Funnefoss on the Glomma, a 10-metre (33 ft) fall.

== History ==
The junction of the Minnesund and the Vorma, Eidsvoll, served as an ancient 'ting' place - or meeting place for the local council or parliament - for Romerike during the period when travel by boat was much easier than by land. The "Eidsivating" was, according to tradition, founded by Halvdan Svarte, and served as the 'ting' place for all of the Opplands and Viken. Saint Olav also held a ting there and built a church at this site in 1017.

In 1795 a landslide totally blocked the Vorma at Disen for 111 days, completely drying the riverbed. A channel was cut around it to prevent a major overflow, with accompanying downstream damage.

On the Vorma, south of Eidsvoll, lies the Svanfoss where the water level in Lake Mjøsa is regulated. A 6-by-60-metre (20 by 197 ft) lock, which bypassed the Svanfoss, lifting boats 3 metres (10 ft) to allow the bypassing of the fall, opened in 1906.

== Geology ==
The Vorma discharges from Lake Mjøsa at the village of Minnesund on the southern lakeshore. The southern shore of Lake Mjøsa is a terminal moraine deposit formed by a pause in the glacial ice retreat (the Minnesund pause) that occurred ~9,400 years before the present. The terminal moraine is characterized by substantial clay, sand and gravel deposits. The Vorma has eroded through these deposits, leaving steep banks with many high gradient tributaries forming cascades as they join the Vorma. The river cut down until it met the less-easily eroded intrusive sill (part of the Oslo Graben) at the town center of Eidsvoll where it formed the Svanfoss. Falls are also found where the Vorma meets the Glomma - the Funnefoss.

The glacial deposits also dammed up a side valley, forming lake Hurdalssjøen. The Hurdalssjøen discharges to the Vorma river at Eidsvoll via the tributary Andelva river. Other tributaries include the Julsrudåa, the Jøndalsåa, and the Holtåa.

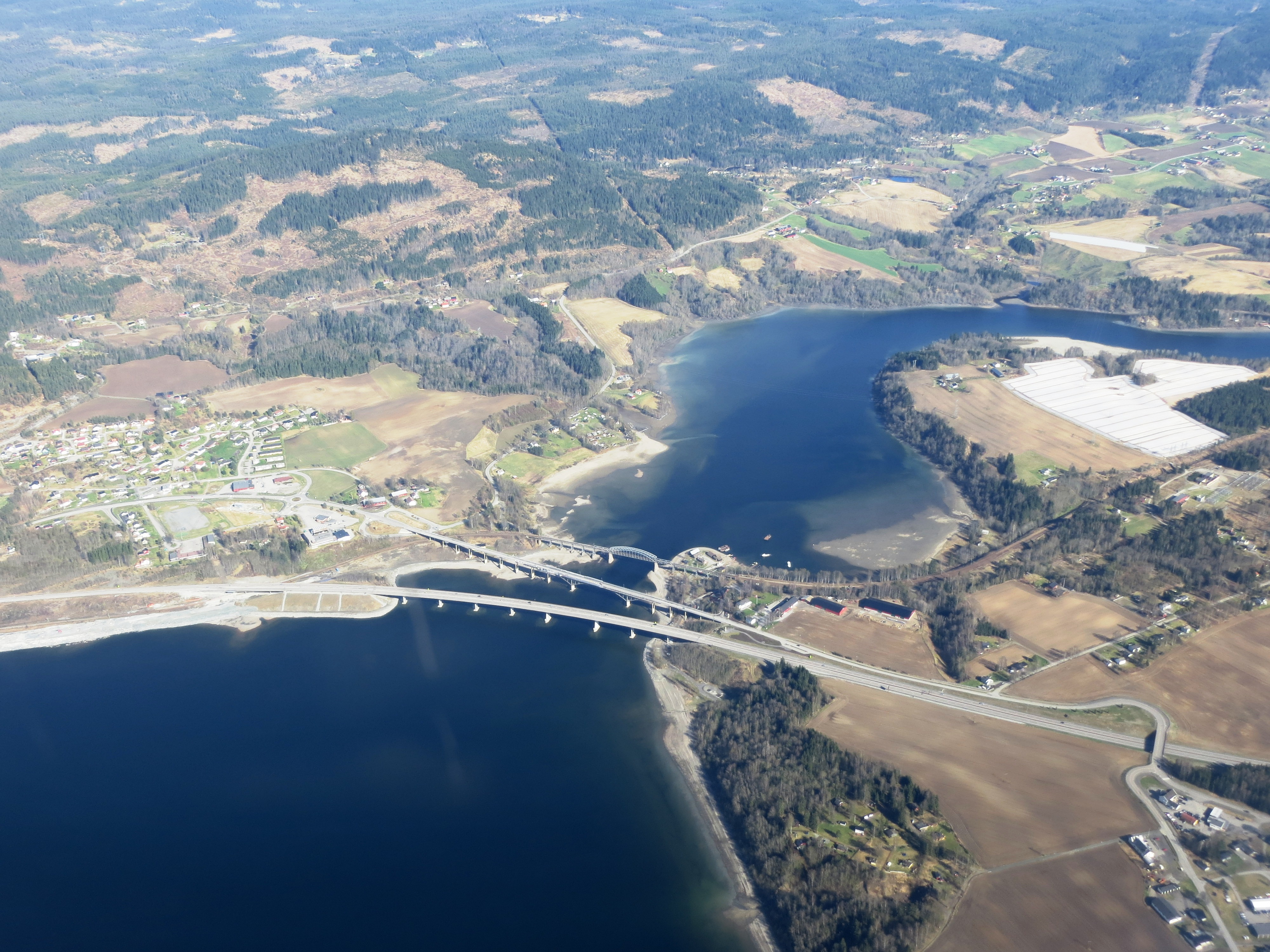
Head of the Vorma at Minnesund

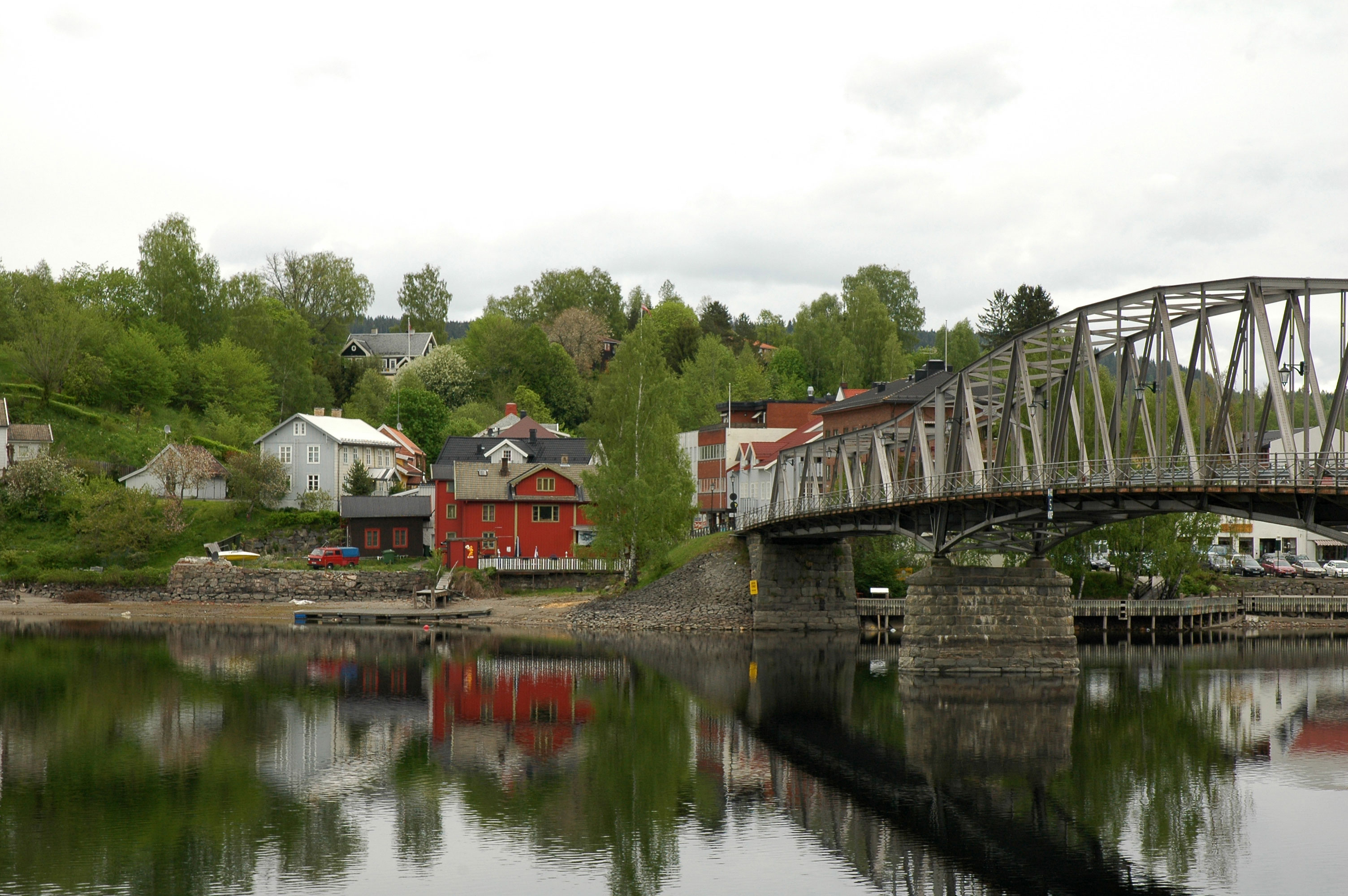
At Eidsvold

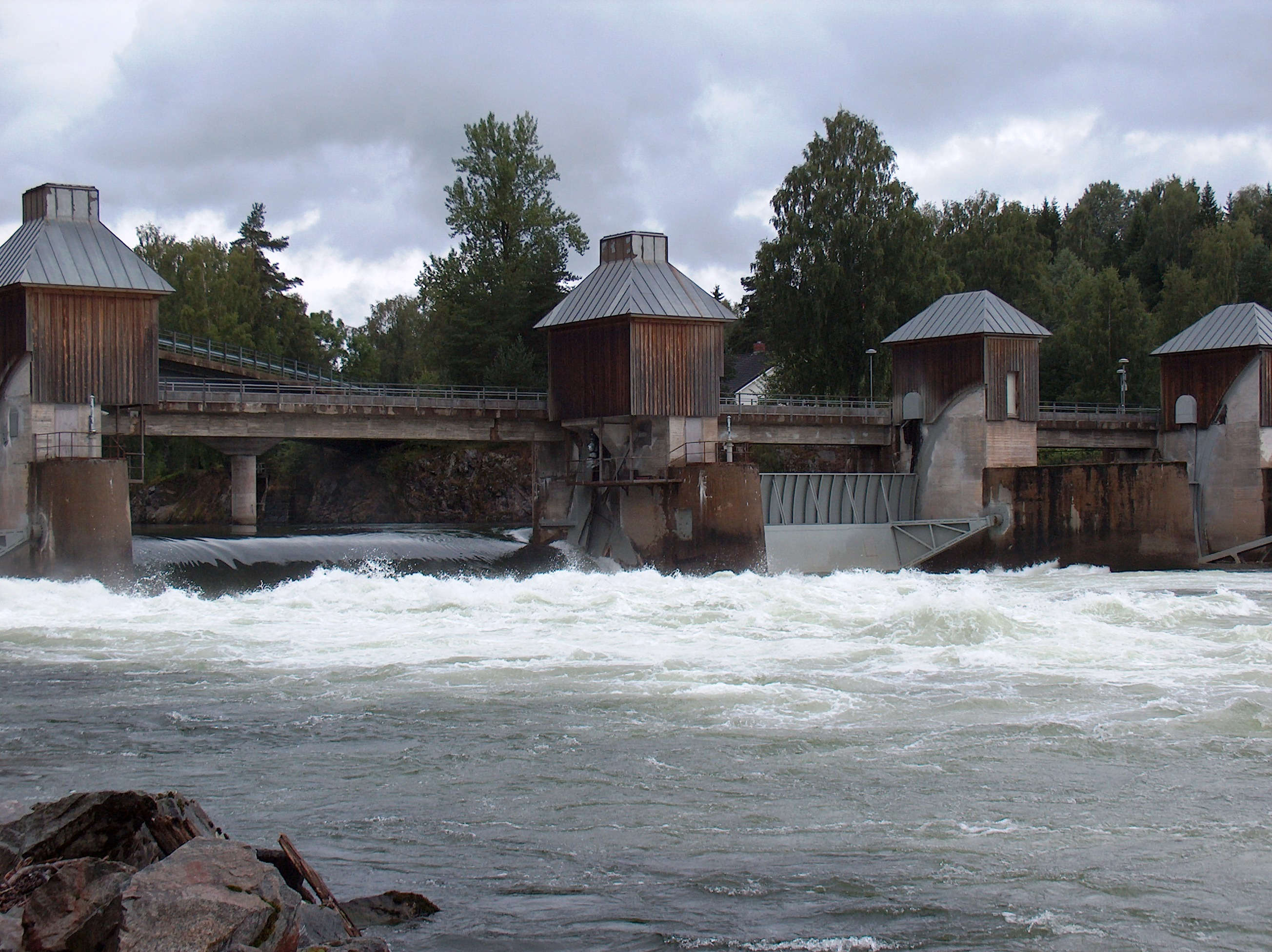
Svanfossen falls

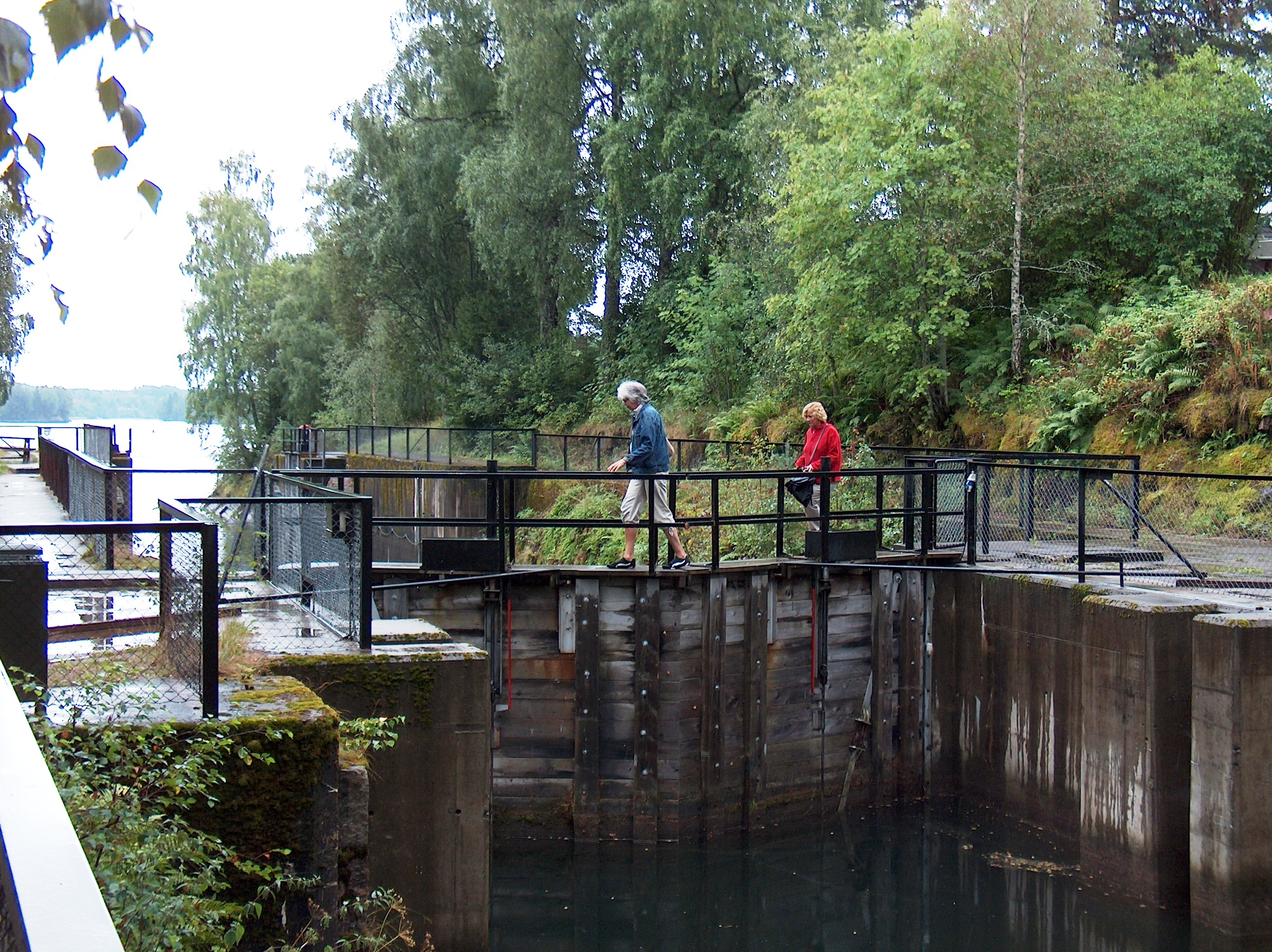
Svanfoss locks

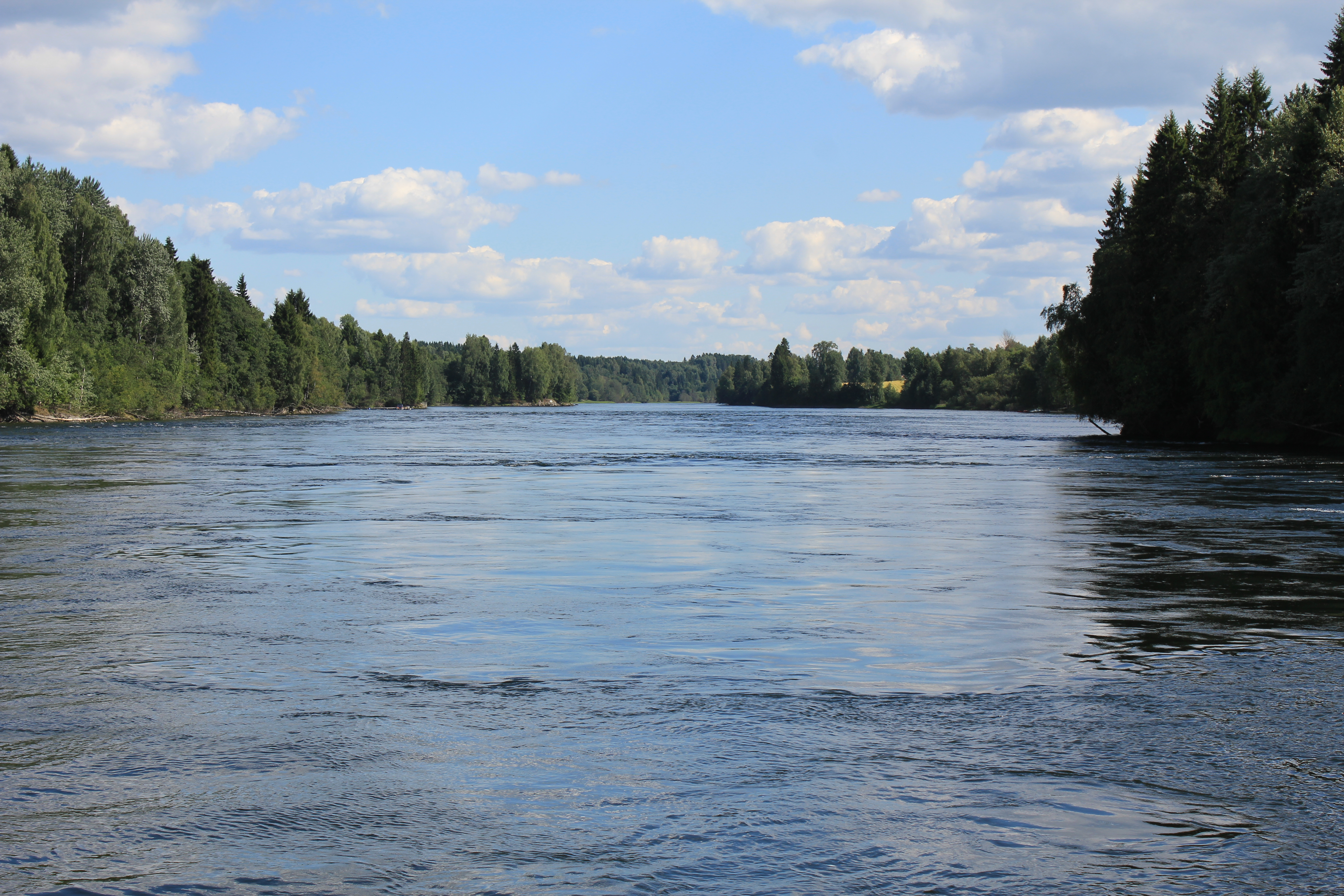
Below Svanfoss

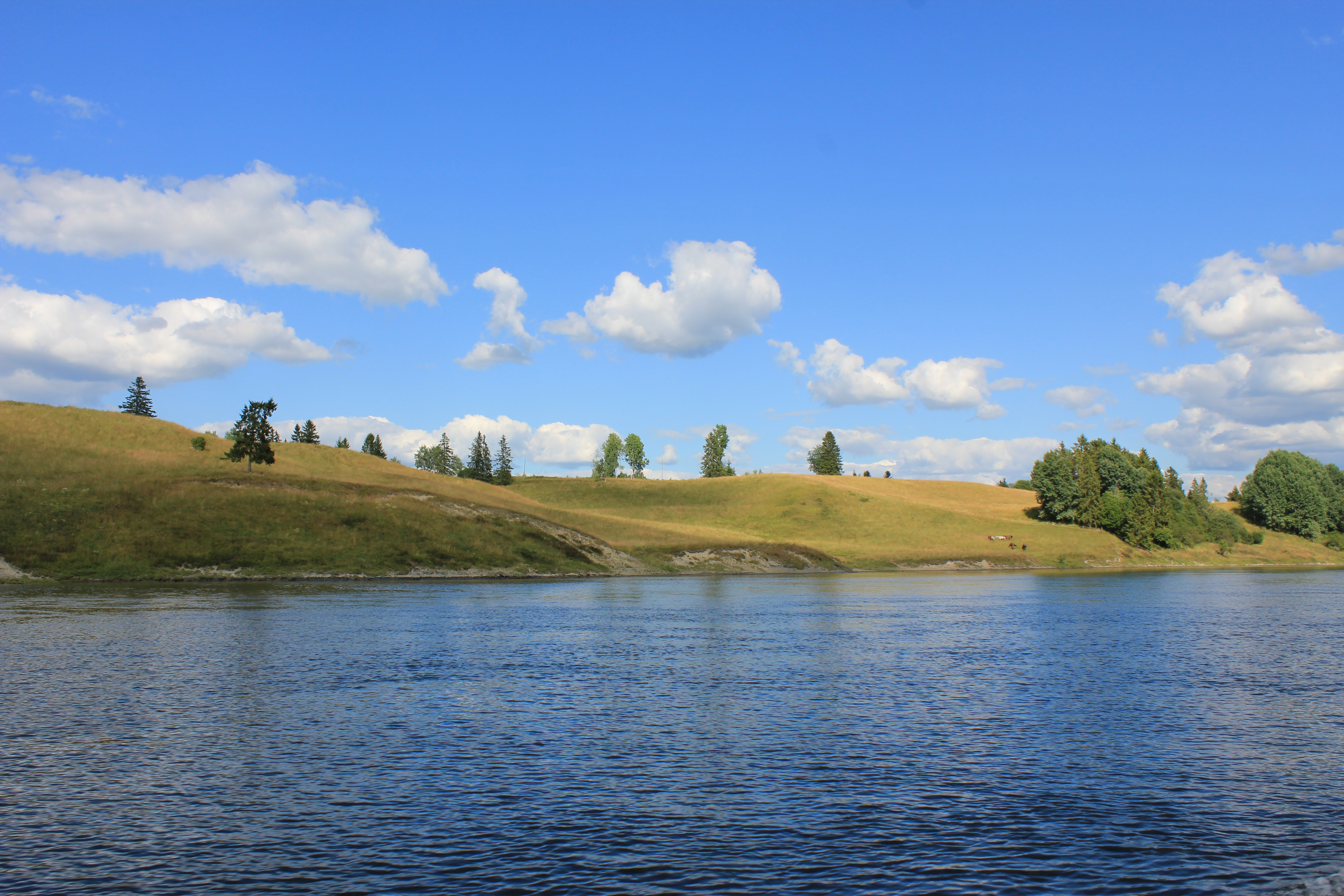
Landscape of the Vorma

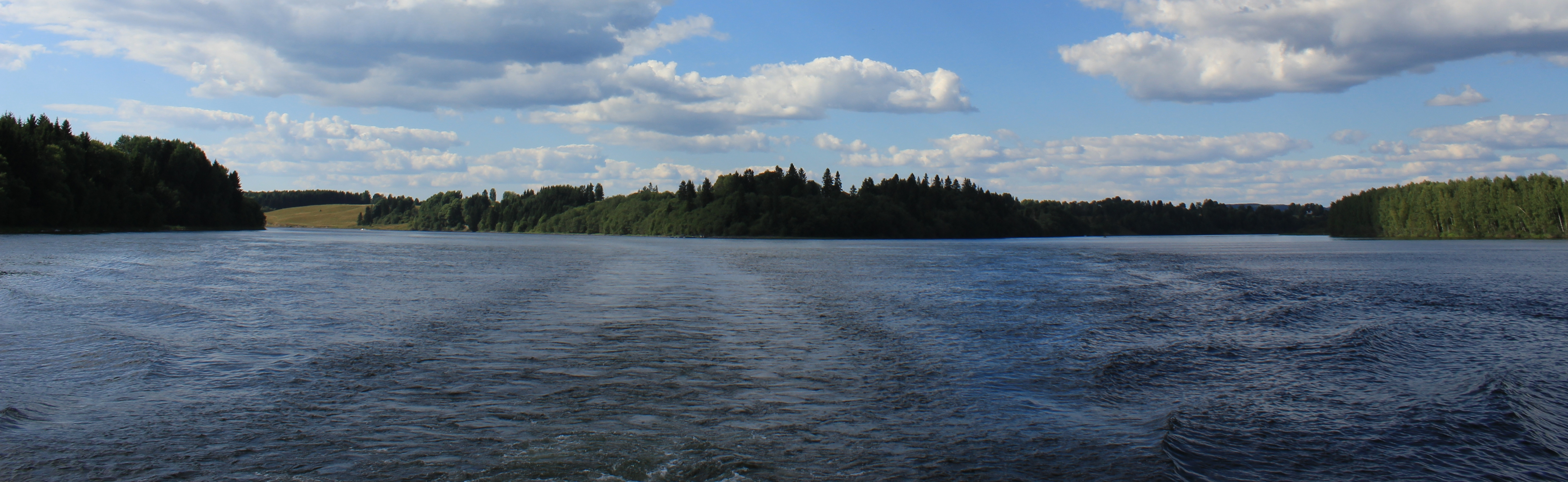
Confluence with the Glomma

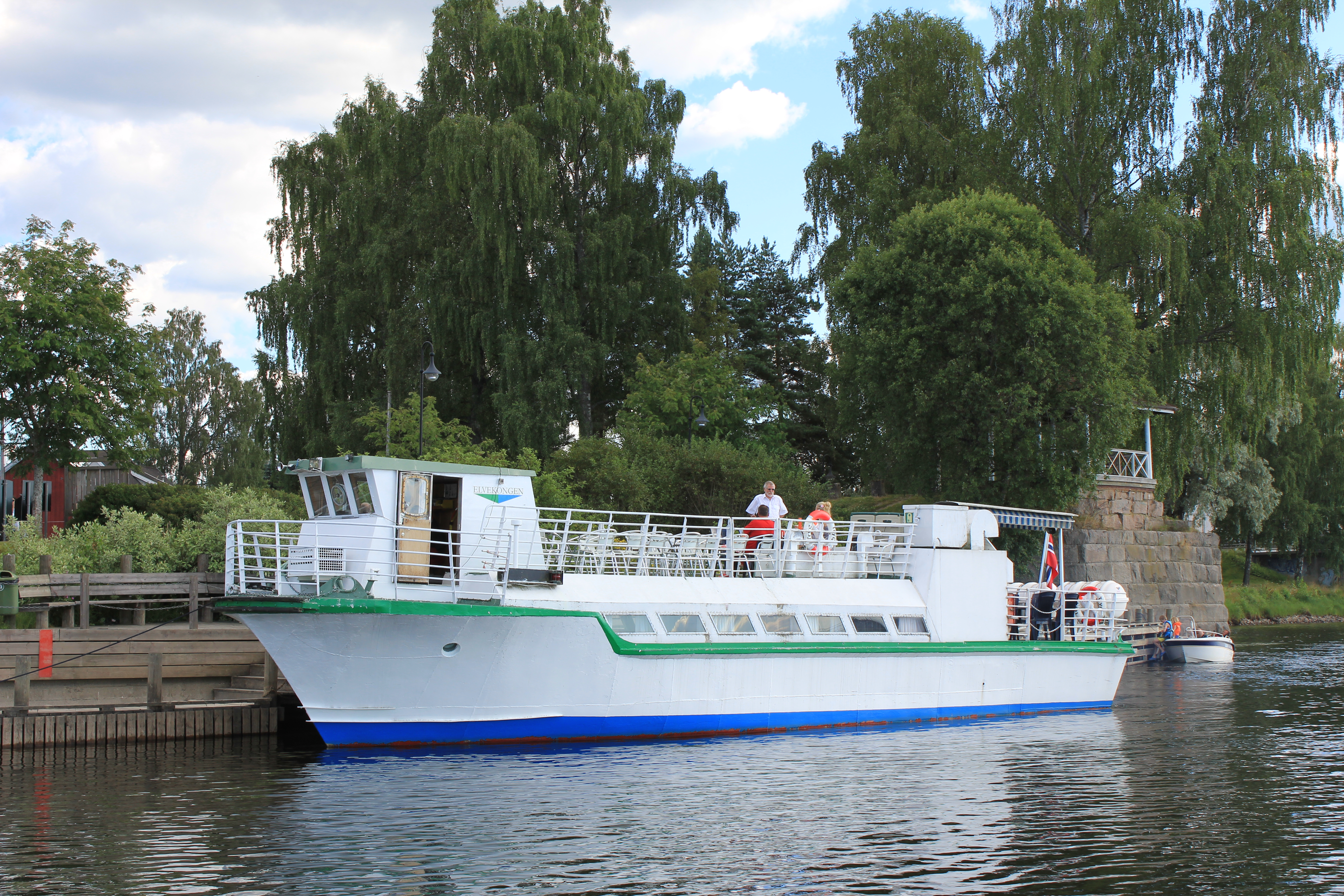
The Elvekongen (the river king) travels up the Vorma to Svanfoss in the summer.
