= Eidsvoll Verk =

- Village
- Location in Akershus
- Coordinates: 60°18′N 11°10′E
- Country: Norway
- Region: Østlandet
- County: Akershus
- District: Eidsvoll
- Time zone: UTC+01:00 (CET)
  - Summer (DST): UTC+02:00 (CEST)

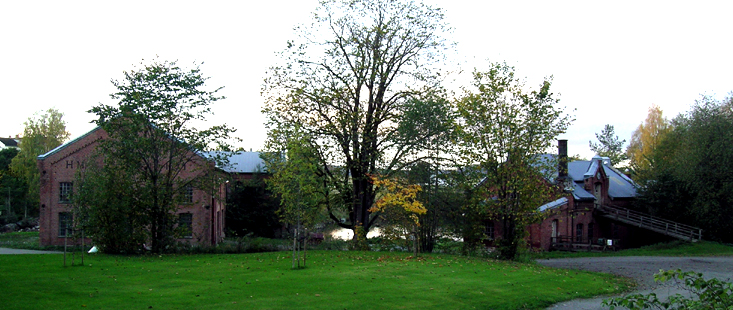
The old mill at Eidsvoll Verk

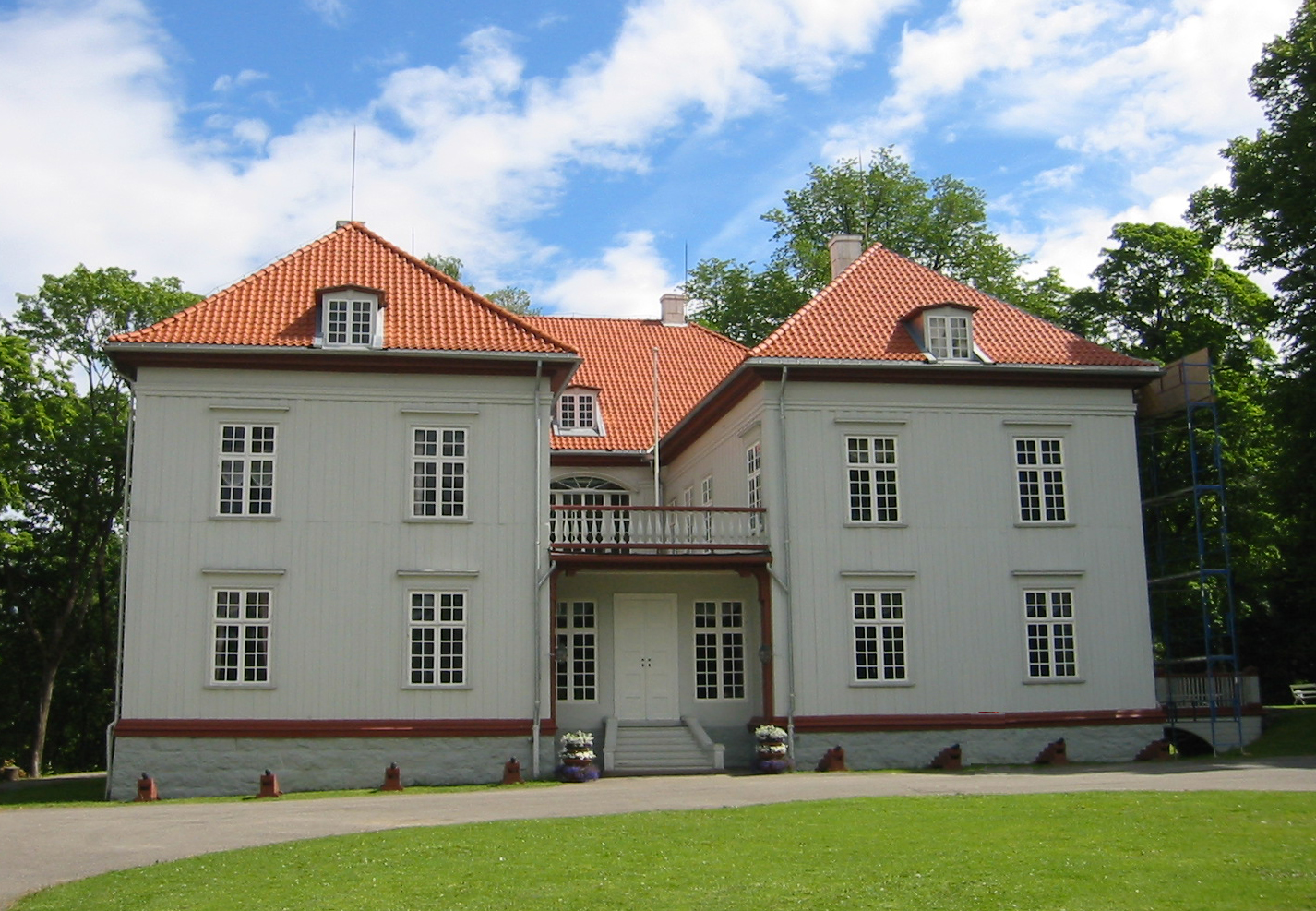
Eidsvoll Manor

Eidsvoll Verk is a village in Eidsvoll, in Akershus County, Norway. It is served by Eidsvoll Verk Station on the Gardermoen Line. It was the site of the former Eidsvold Iron Works. It is also the site of the Eidsvoll Manor, where the Constitution of Norway was signed in 1814.

== Eidsvold Iron Works ==
Eidsvold Iron Works (Eidsvoll Jernverk) was a former ironworks which was in operation from 1624 to 1822. Eidsvold Verk was opened by King Christian IV in 1624 as a foundry for iron, driven by water power from Andelva River. After 1634 Eidsvold Verk belonged to Gabriel Marselis, King Frederick III and Hannibal Sehested. In 1660, Duke Jacob of Courland purchased Eidsvold Iron Works from King Frederik III and had 120 artisans relocated. The iron works was its best era of operation under Heinrich von Schlanbusch (1688-1705) who received the property as the gift of King Christian V and his son Georg Theodor (1705-1750). Carsten Anker bought the Eidsvold Iron Works in 1794 and settled on site in 1811.

== Eidsvoll Manor ==
Eidsvoll Manor (Eidsvollsbygningen) is a historic Manor House. The building was first constructed ca. 1770. As it stands today, the manor is the result of an extensive renovation and modernization in the years around 1800 by Carsten Anker. He took residence in Eidsvoll in 1811, rebuilding the house which is now the Eidsvoll Manor. When the building was finished, it was one of the largest and most modern private residences in the country. Inspiration had been received from the then-modern Danish and French architecture. The building bears stylistic stamp of classical architecture. The total floor area of the building is over 2,000 square meters.

In 1814, the Constitution of Norway was signed at Eidsvoll on May 17, now known as Norwegian Constitution Day. Carsten Anker went bankrupt in 1822 and the estate was sold at auction in 1823. A group of private citizens by Henrik Wergeland organized a fundraiser that allowed them to buy the building with the pavilion and the garden. In 1851 the Parliament of Norway took over Eidsvoll Manor. Eventually the property was preserved and operated as a public museum. For the centennial of the Norwegian Constitution in 1914, the national government allocated resources to restore the building to its historical figure from 1814. The government conducted for an additional restoration for the 150-anniversary of the Constitution in 1964.

== Other source ==
- Eidsvoll 1814 - rikspolitisk senter (2002) Mitt stolte Eidsvold" - en guide til Eidsvollsbygningen (Eidsvoll: RK Grafisk)
- Holmsen, Andreas (1950 ) Eidsvoll Bygds Historie (Oslo: Eidsvoll Bygdebokkomite)
