= Strømnes =

Strømnes is a Norwegian surname. Notable people with the surname include:

- Åsmund L. Strømnes (1927–2009), Norwegian educationalist
- Steinar Strømnes (born 1987), Norwegian footballer
