= Rognhaugen =

Mountain in Innlandet, Norway

- Interactive map of the mountain

Highest point
- Elevation: 720 m (2,360 ft)
- Prominence: 171 m (561 ft)
- Parent peak: Lushaugen
- Isolation: 4.9 km (3.0 mi)
- Coordinates: 60°24′19″N 10°52′42″E

Geography
- Location: Innlandet, Norway

Rognhaugen is a mountain in Eastern Norway. The mountain lies along the border of Gran Municipality in Innlandet county and Hurdal Municipality in Akershus county. The 720-metre (2,360 ft) tall mountain is located about 16 kilometres (9.9 mi) east of the village of Jaren and about 9 kilometres (5.6 mi) west of the lake Hurdalsjøen.

== See also ==
- List of mountains of Norway by height
