= Eidsvoll =

Eidsvoll Municipality Eidsvoll kommune
- Municipality
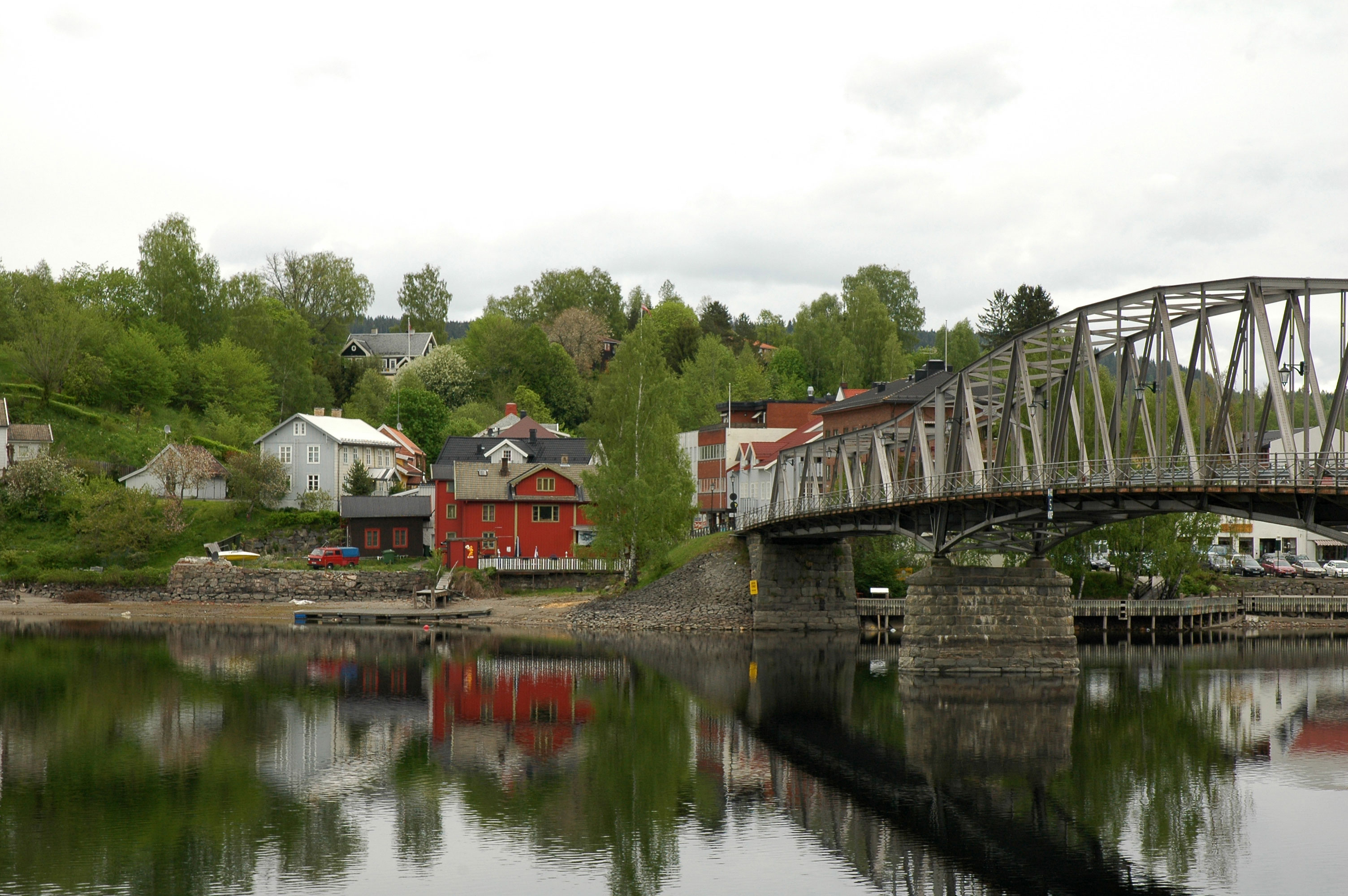
- Sundet, the municipal center, with the old bridge

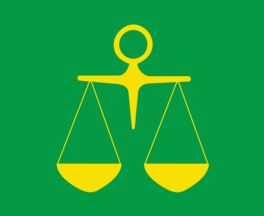
- Flag Coat of arms

- Akershus within Norway

- Eidsvoll within Akershus
- Coordinates: 60°21′N 11°15′E
- Country: Norway
- County: Akershus
- District: Romerike
- Administrative centre: Sundet

Government
  - Mayor (2023): Nina Kristengård (Høyre)

Area
  - Total: 457 km^{2} (176 sq mi)
  - Land: 385 km^{2} (149 sq mi)
  - Rank: #222 in Norway

Population (2004)
  - Total: 24,647
  - Rank: #46 in Norway
  - Density: 54/km^{2} (140/sq mi)
  - Change (10 years): ▲ +9.4%
- Demonym: Eidsvolling

Official language
  - Norwegian form: Bokmål
- Time zone: UTC+01:00 (CET)
  - Summer (DST): UTC+02:00 (CEST)
- ISO 3166 code: NO-3240
- Website: Official website

Eidsvoll (pronounced [ˈæ̀ɪdsvɔɫ]; sometimes written as Eidsvold) is a municipality in Akershus county, Norway. It is part of the Romerike traditional region. The administrative centre of the municipality is the village of Sundet.

== General information ==
=== Etymology ===
The first element is the genitive case of the word eid (Old Norse: eið) and the last element is voll (Old Norse: vǫllr) which means "meadow" or "field". The meaning of the word eid in this case is "a road passing around a waterfall". People from the districts around the lake (Mjøsa) who were sailing down the river Vorma, and people from Romerike sailing up the same river, both had to enter this area by passing the Sundfossen waterfall. Because of this, the site became an important meeting place long before the introduction of Christianity. Prior to 1918, the name was spelled "Eidsvold". The town of Eidsvold in Queensland, Australia and Eidsvold Township, Lyon County, Minnesota, United States still use this old spelling.

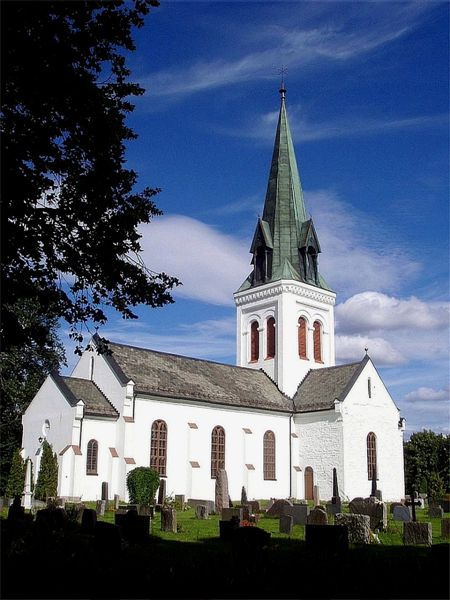
Eidsvoll Church

=== Eidsvoll Church ===
Eidsvoll Church (Eidsvoll Kirke) is a cruciform church from approx 1200. It is part of the Norwegian Church and belongs to Øvre Romerike deanery in the Diocese of Borg. The Romanesque building is in stone. Eidsvoll church is repeatedly burned and rebuilt. The old church records were lost in a fire. The altarpiece in Eidsvoll church is from 1765. It is a wooden structure with three floors, decreasing towards the top, where each floor concludes with gilded pilasters with capitals and rococo decor on each side of a painting. The altarpiece was restored after a fire in 1883, the next restoration occurred in 1915 and a third restoration occurred late 1960s. Access to the church is a well traveled tourist destination is via Rv181 and Fv502 / Rv177. Pilegrimsleden goes through Eidsvoll. Eidsvoll church is one of the more prominent stops along the path, which was officially opened on 16 June 2002.

=== Coat-of-arms ===
The coat-of-arms is from modern times. They were granted on 20 November 1987. The arms show a balance as a symbol of justice. In the early Middle Ages a local court was established in Eidsvoll.

Ethnic minorities (1st and 2nd generation) by country of origin, 2017
Country of origin	Number
Poland	559
Lithuania	236
Sweden	187
Pakistan	179
Afghanistan	137
Thailand	134
Philippines	132
Denmark	104
Iraq	97
Russia	96

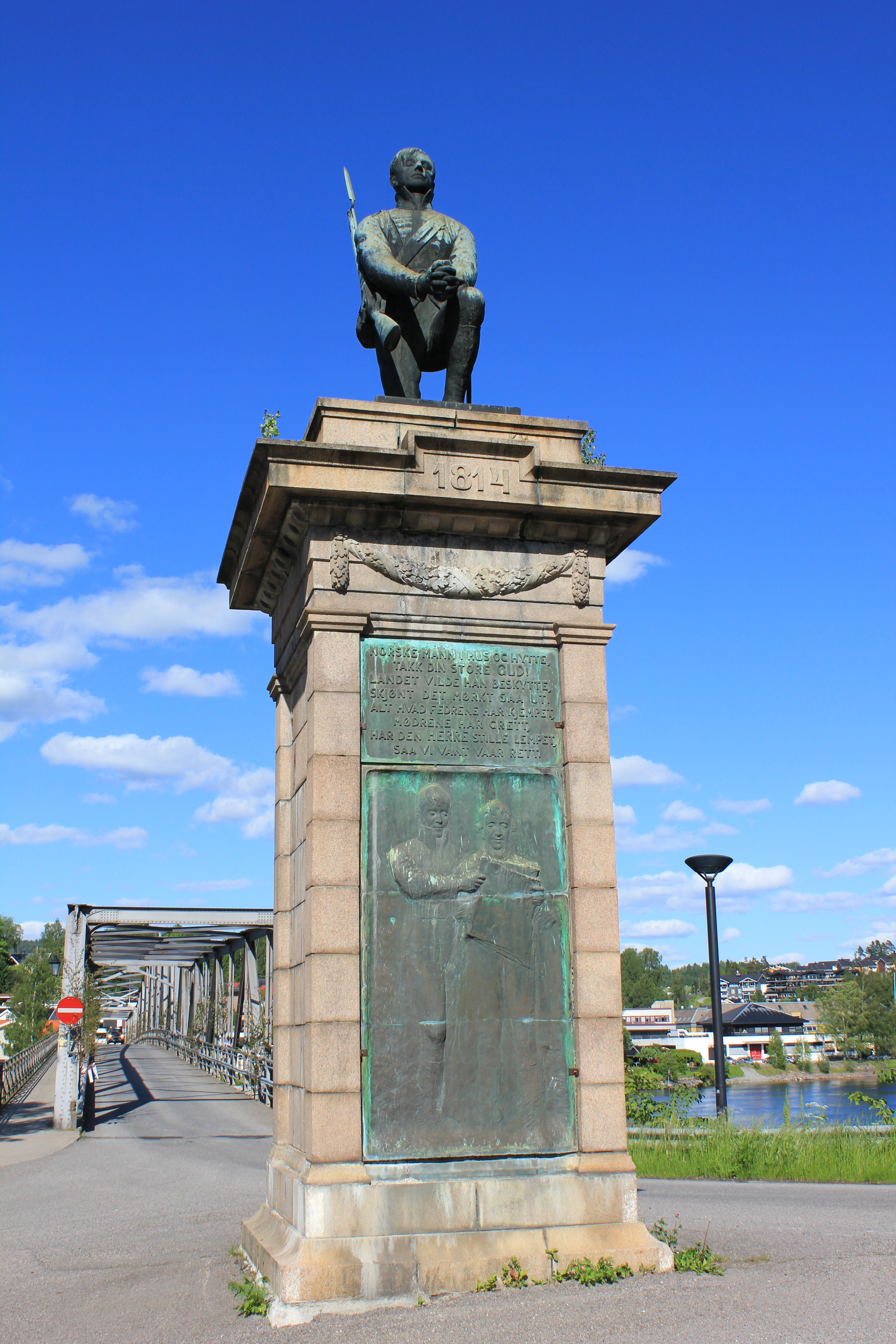
Memorial statue to the constitutional assembly at Eidsvoll in 1814

== History ==
The parish of Eidsvold was established as a municipality on 1 January 1838 (see formannskapsdistrikt). The municipality of Feiring was merged with Eidsvoll on 1 January 1964.

Eidsvoll is mentioned in Old Norse manuscripts. In the 11th century, it became the site of court and assembly (ting) for eastern parts of Norway, replacing Vang, now a part of Hamar in Hedmark. Because of its access to the river Vorma and the lake Mjøsa, Eidsvoll has long provided a thoroughfare to northern parts of inland Norway. Historically the main industry of Eidsvoll was agriculture, though the soil is rich in clay. Eastern parts of Eidsvoll were for a short time the site of a minor gold rush when gold was found in 1758, and these areas are still known as Gullverket.

Eidsvoll Verk was opened to smelt iron ore by King Christian IV of Denmark in 1624, relying on the excellent water power from the Andelva river. In 1688, it was owned by the director of the Kongsberg Silver Mines, Schlanbusch, and remained in his family until 1781. Carsten Anker came into possession of works in 1794, at which time it was in decay since many of the surrounding forests required for charcoal had been depleted. He restored it and set up the production of stoves and similar iron goods. He also took residence in Eidsvoll in 1811, rebuilding the manor house which is now the Eidsvollsbygningen, the site where the constitutional assembly met to draft and sign the Constitution of Norway on 17 May 1814. Eidsvollsbygningen is today a famous museum.

In 1854, Eidsvoll became the end point for the first railroad line in Norway from Oslo. This became the transit point for travel with the steamship Skibladner to Hamar, Gjøvik, and Lillehammer on the lake Mjøsa. In addition to the historic Eidsvoll Church, Eidsvoll is the site of the Langset Church (Langset kirke) which dates to 1859 and the Feiring Church (Feiring Kirke) which dates to 1875.

== Eidsvoll gallery ==
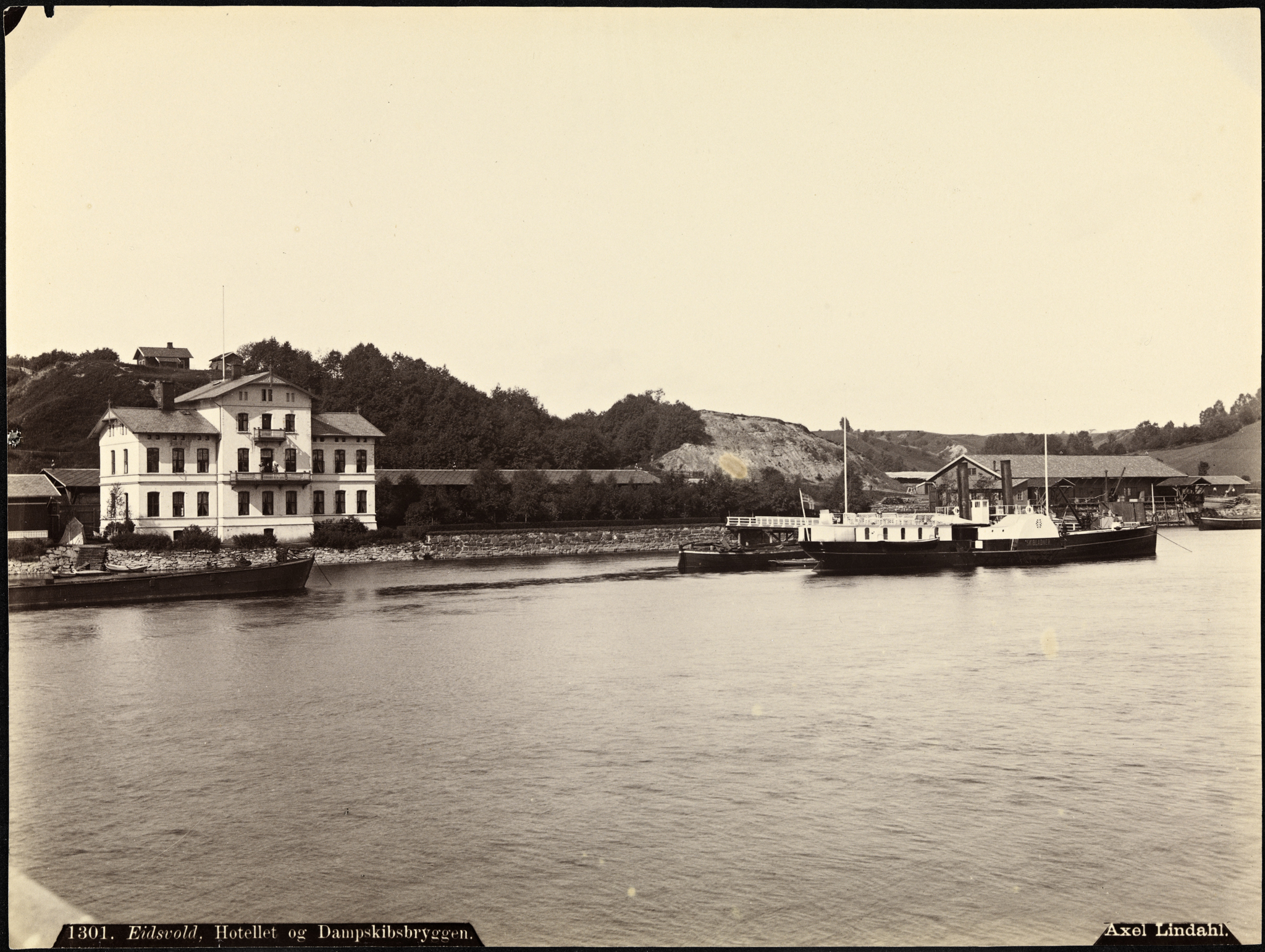
Steamer Skibladner, Dampskibsbryggen and Eidsvold Hotel

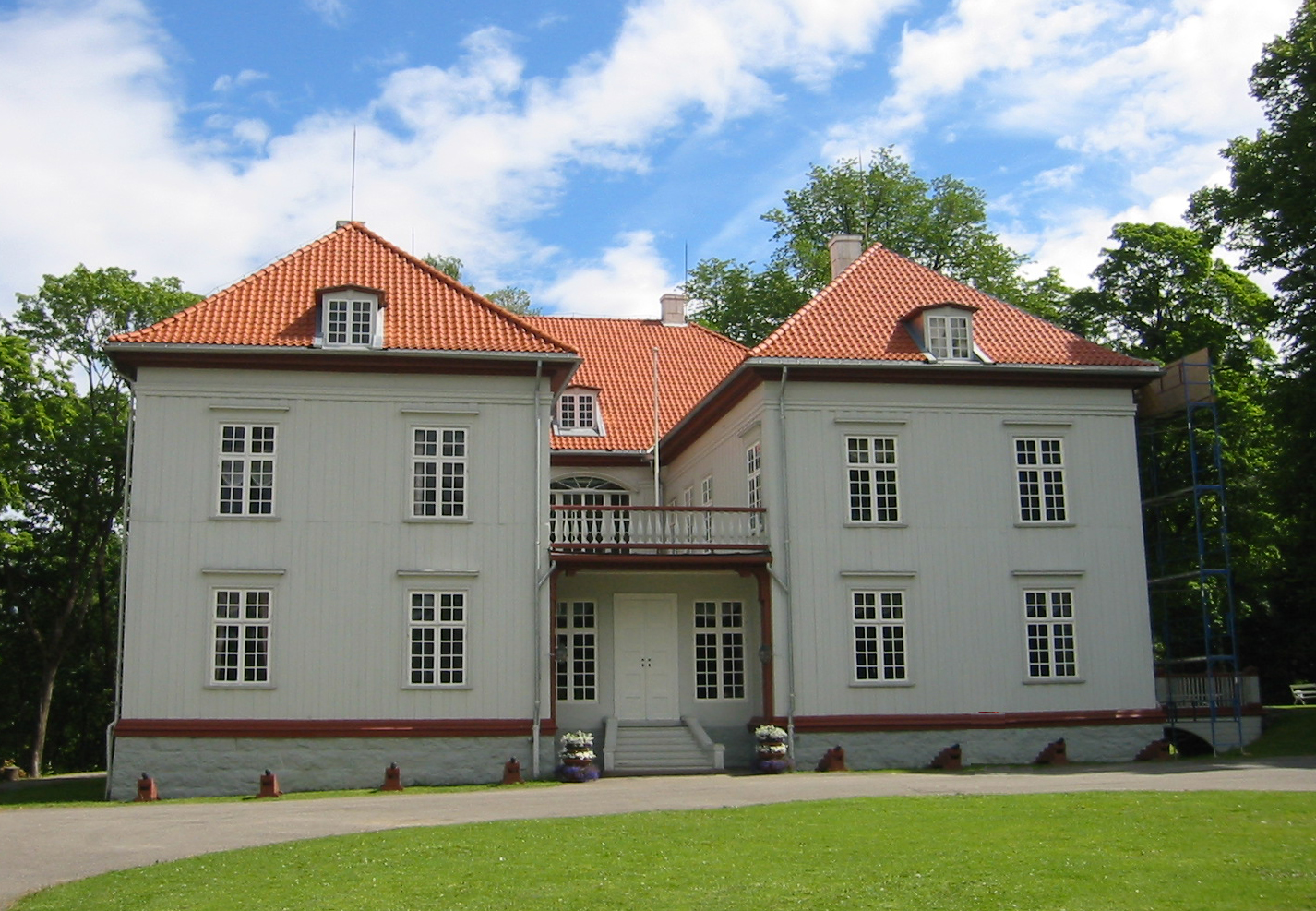
Eidsvollsbygningen at Eidsvoll Verk, site of the constitutional assembly

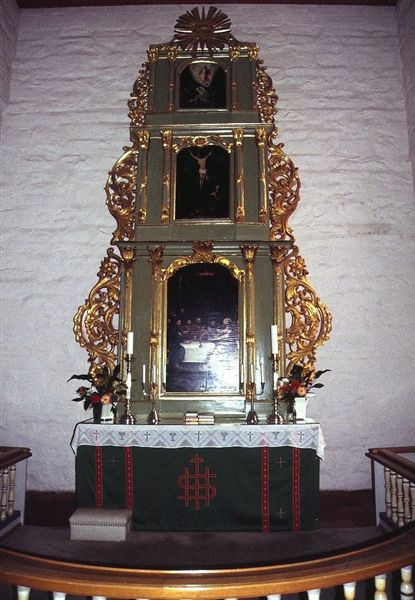
Eidsvoll Church altar

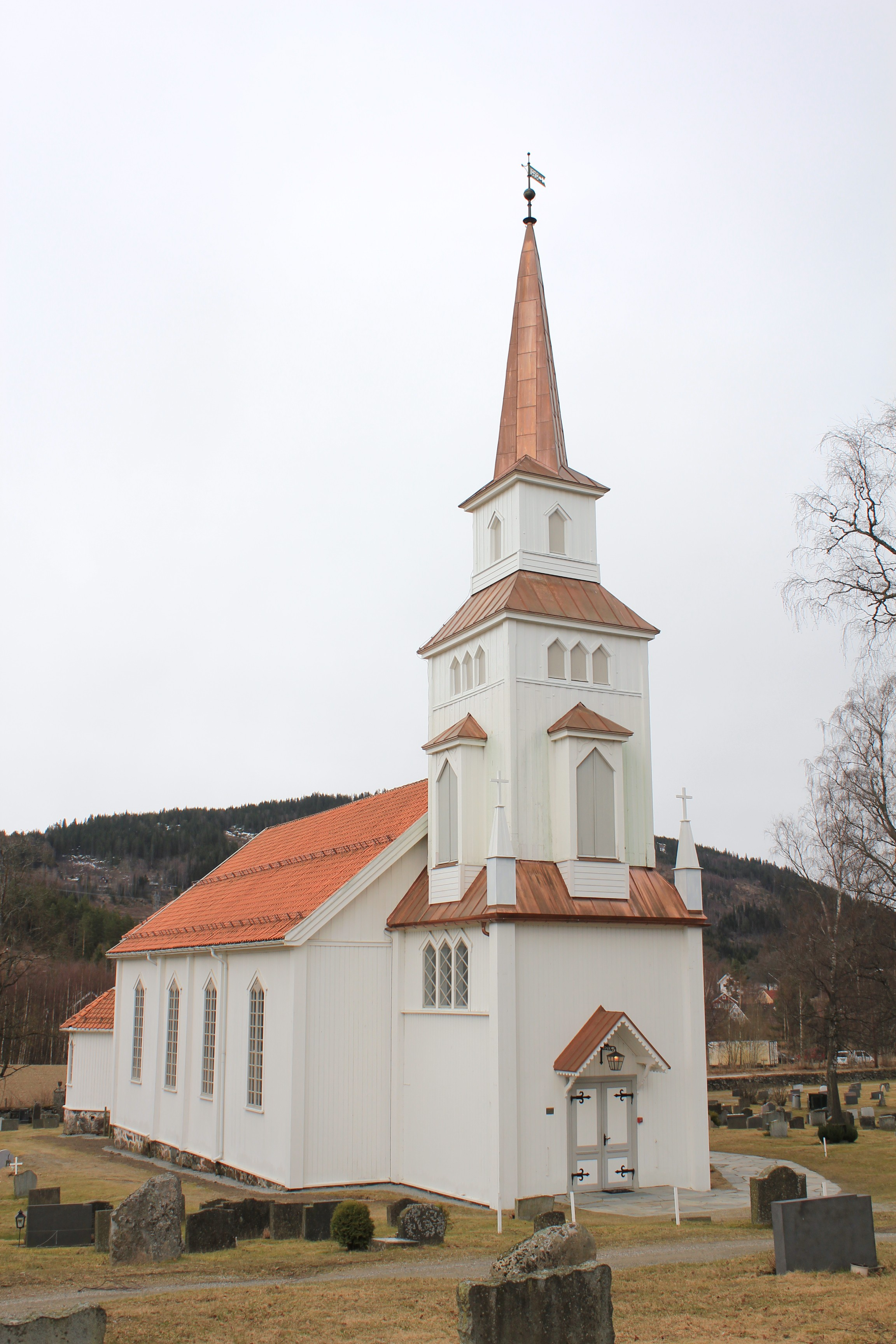
Langset Church

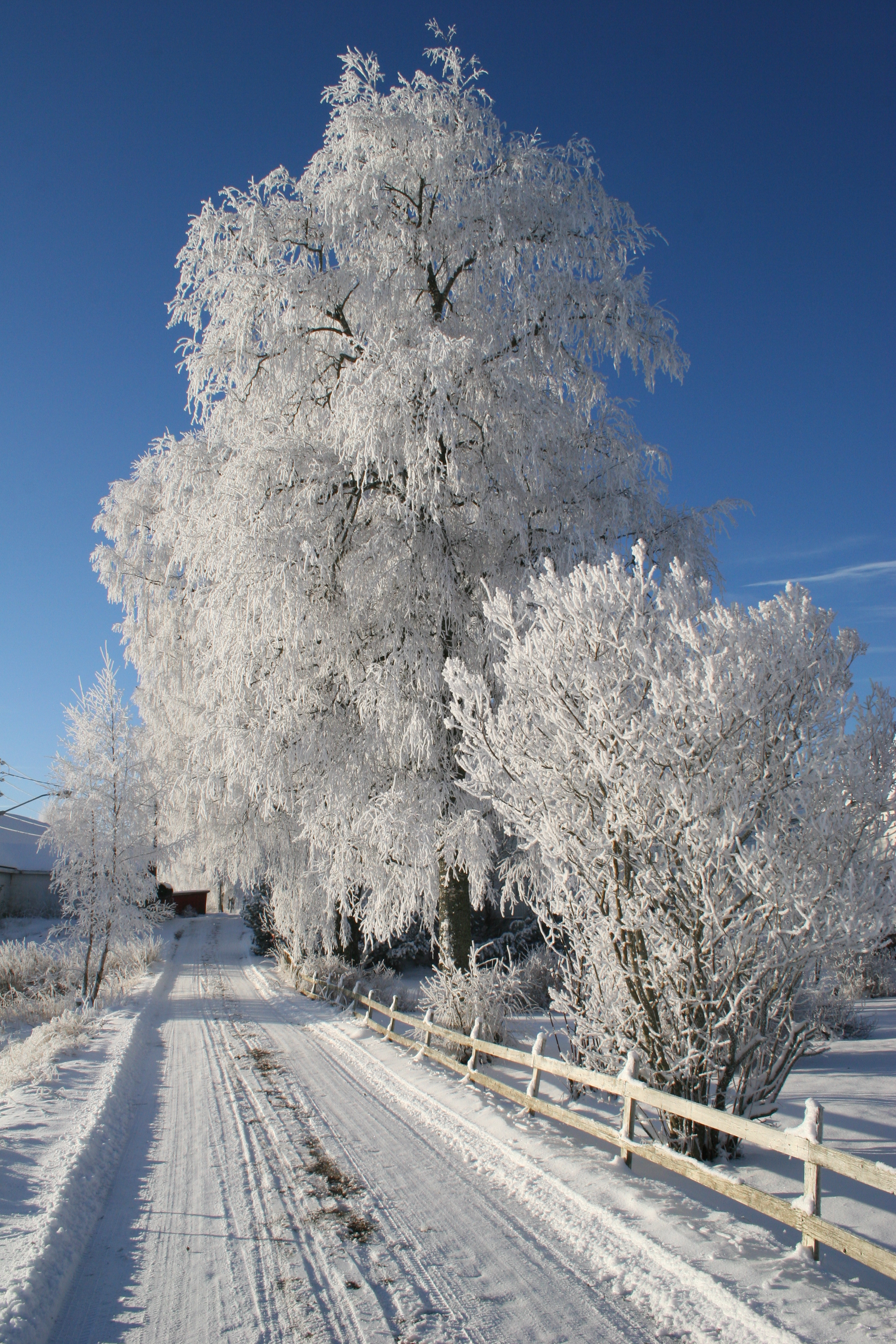
Winter at Bøn in Eidsvoll

== Geography ==
Eidsvoll Municipality is located in Akershus county, along the border with Innlandet county to the north and east. It is bordered on the north by Østre Toten Municipality (in Innlandet county on the west side of lake Mjøsa) and by Stange Municipality (on the east side of the lake) and to the east by Nord-Odal Municipality (both in Innlandet county). To the southeast lies Nes Municipality, to the south lies Ullensaker Municipality, and to the west lies Nannestad Municipality and Hurdal Municipality (all in Akershus county).

In addition to being a commuter town for Oslo, it also has agriculture and forestry industries. The main population and commercial centres are Sundet and Råholt.

== Notable residents ==
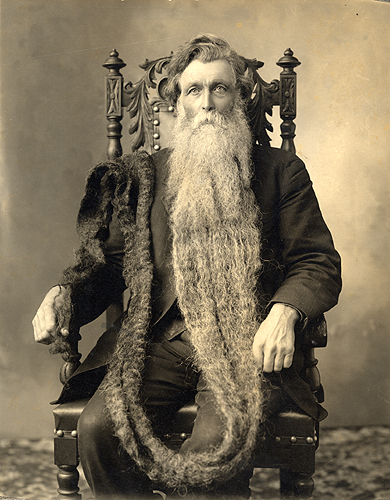
Hans Langseth, 1912

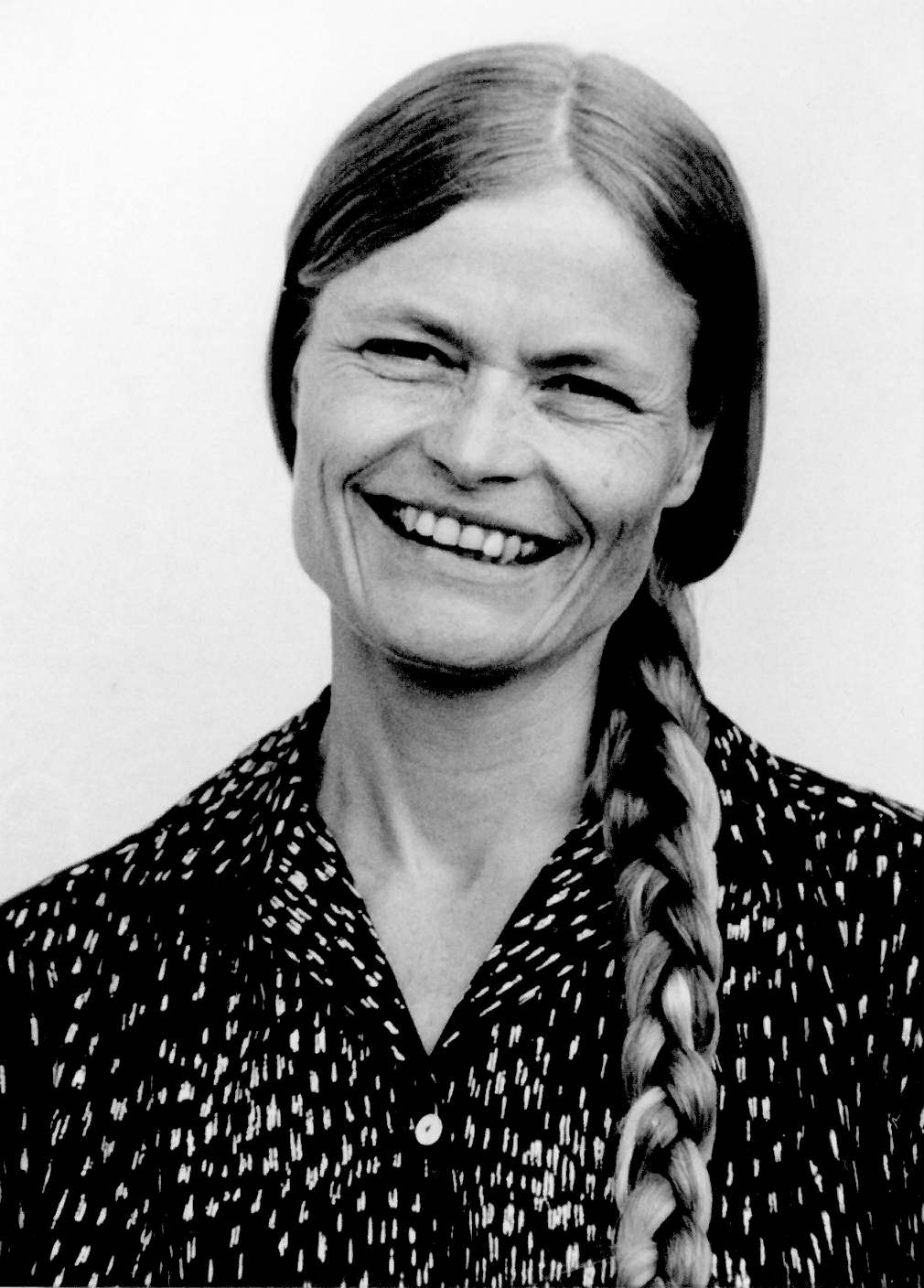
Drude Berntsen, 2013

- Henrik Wergeland (1808–1845), poet, writer and playwright; brought up in Eidsvoll; son of Professor Nicolai Wergeland (1780–1848)
- Alf Collett (1844–1919), Norwegian writer, genealogist and historian
- Hans Langseth (1846–1927) Norwegian-American world record holder for the longest beard
- Gyda Gram (1851–1906), painter
- Cecilie Thoresen Krog (1858–1911), feminist pioneer, first female university student in Norway
- Fredrikke Waaler (1865–1952) composer, violinist and proponent for women's rights
- Maja Flagstad (1871–1958) a pianist, choral conductor and répétiteur
- F. Melius Christiansen (1871–1955) Lutheran choral conductor in Marinette, Wisconsin
- Arne Ekeland (1908–1994), artist, lived and worked in Bøn his entire life
- Ola Skjåk Bræk (1912–1999), minister of industry, born and raised in Eidsvoll
- Per Gjestvang (1915–2002) a veterinarian, resistance member, military officer and politician
- Dagmar Lahlum (1923–1999), resistance worker in WWII, fiancée of Eddie Chapman
- Åsmund Lønning Strømnes (1927–2009), professor of education; lived in Eidsvoll
- Leif Johansen (1930–1982) an economist and professor
- Sivert Donali (1931–2010) a Norwegian sculptor, lived in Feiring from 1973
- Drude Berntsen (born 1939) a computer scientist, director of Norwegian Computing Center
- Kari Hag (born 1941) mathematician, researched complex analysis on quasicircles
- Siv Stubsveen (born 1968) a Norwegian model, saleswoman and media personality
- Stian Carstensen (born 1971) a multi-instrument jazz musician, member of Farmers market
- Jan Gunnar Røise (born 1975) a Norwegian theatre and film actor.
- Stella Mwangi (born 1986) a Kenyan-Norwegian singer, musician, songwriter and rapper
- Alexandra Rotan (born 1996) a singer for Norway in the Eurovision Song Contest 2019

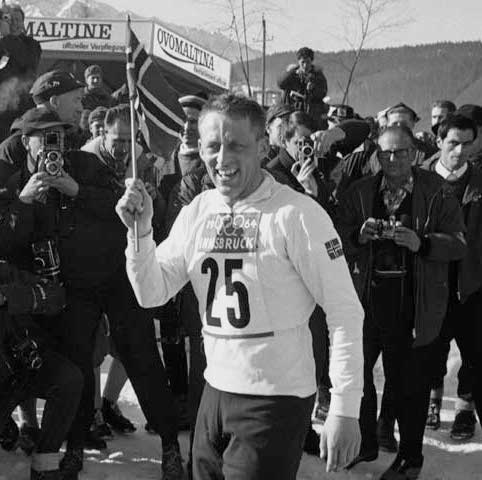
Tormod Knutsen, 1964

=== Sport ===
- Tormod Knutsen (1932-2021) a retired Nordic combined skier, silver and gold medallist at the 1960 & 1964 Winter Olympics
- Ole Einar Martinsen (born 1967) a retired footballer with 300 club caps and two with Norway
- Henning Berg (born 1969) a football manager and former player with 422 club caps and 100 with Norway
- Espen Aarnes Hvammen (born 1988) a Norwegian champion speed skater
- Henrik Furuseth (born 1996) a Norwegian racing driver

== Sister cities ==
The following cities are twinned with Eidsvoll:

- - Egilsstaðir, Iceland
- - Skara, Västra Götaland County, Sweden
- - Sorø, Region Sjælland, Denmark
- - Suolahti, Länsi-Suomi, Finland
