= Per Gjestvang =

Per Oluf Gjestvang (17 March 1915 – 26 January 2002) was a Norwegian veterinarian, resistance member, military officer, and politician for the Conservative Party.

He was born in Eidsvoll, and finished his secondary education in 1934. He then took a military education in the engineer corps, and tutored at the camp at Hvalsmoen. He also attended the Norwegian School of Veterinary Science from 1935, and graduated with the cand.med.vet. degree in 1941. During the occupation of Norway by Nazi Germany he was a member of Milorg, as "pioneer leader" in District 13.

He worked as an assistant veterinary in Lesja Municipality and Dovre Municipality in 1942 before returning to the Norwegian School of Veterinary Science. He worked as a research assistant from 1942 to 1945, an associate professor from 1946 to 1953 and then docent from 1954 to 1955 before being hired as chief veterinary in the Norwegian Defence Forces in 1955. He remained here until retirement in 1980. He held the degree Colonel from 1969.

Gjestvang was also a secretary-general of the Norwegian Veterinary Association from 1945 to 1948, and was a member and chairman (from 1958) of the central board from 1954 to 1966. He chaired the Norwegian Equestrian Federation from 1976 to 1982, Dyrenes Beskyttelse from 1982 to 1986 and was a vice president in Norges Dyrebeskyttelsesforbund from 1984 to 1988. He was also involved in the Norwegian Red Cross and Rotary, and was a member of the municipal council for Stange Municipality from 1972 to 1983. He was chosen as leader of the local Conservative Party branch in 1993.

Gjestvang was decorated with the Defence Medal 1940–1945 in 1945, the Order of the Dannebrog in 1963, the Forsvarsmedaljen in 1983 and the HM The King's Medal of Merit in 1995. He was an honorary member of the Norwegian Veterinary Association from 1977 as well as its Swedish and Finnish counterparts from 1965 and 1977 respectively. He died in January 2002.
