= Drude Berntsen =

Norwegian computer scientist (born 1939)

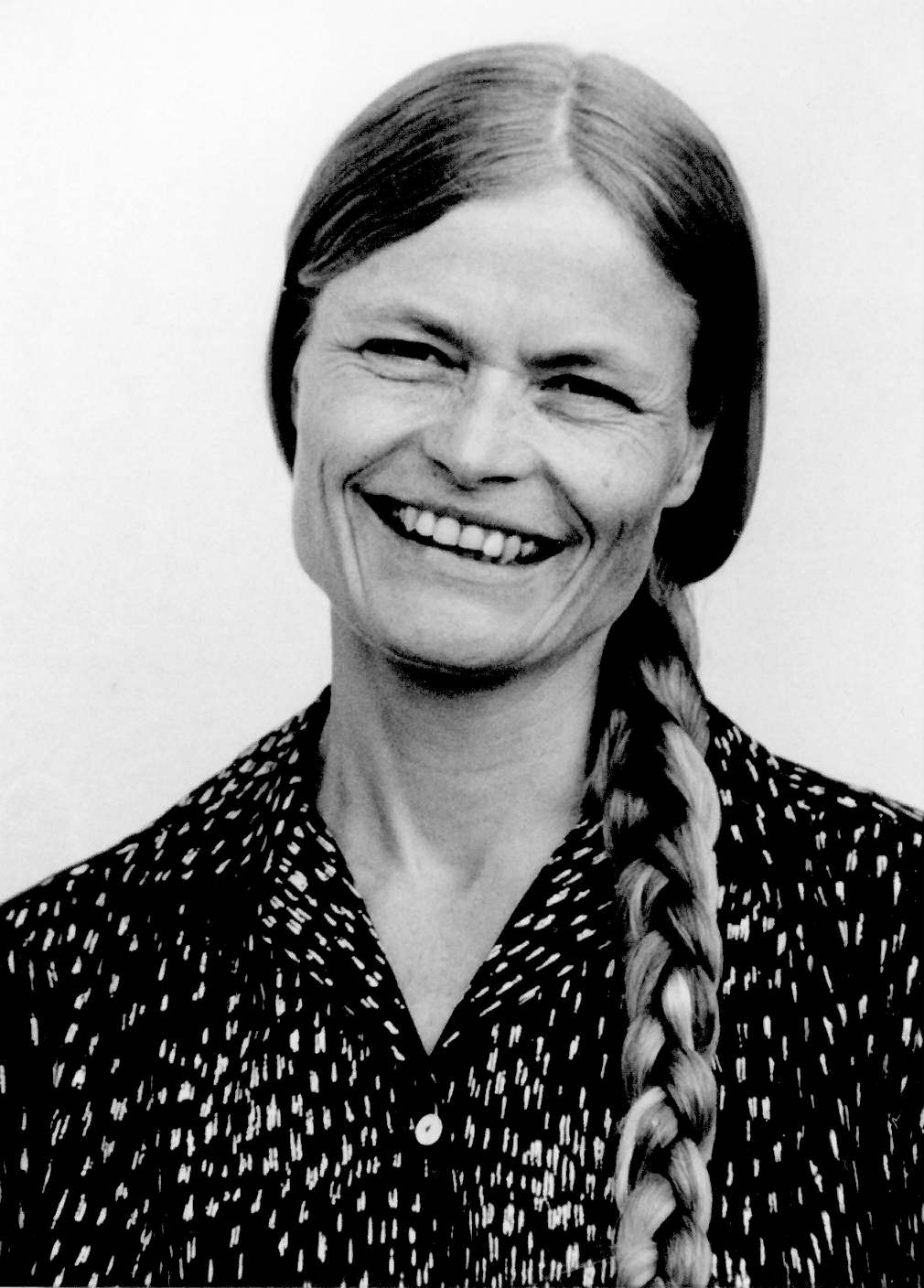
- Born: 21 February 1939 (age 87); Halden, Norway
- Education: University of Oslo
- Occupation: Computer scientist

Drude Elisabeth Berntsen (born 21 Feb 1939) is a Norwegian computer scientist who was director of the Norwegian Computing Center (Norsk Regnesentral) from 1970 to 1990. It was unusual for a woman to hold such a high-ranking position at a time of male dominance in computing.

== Biography ==
Berntsen grew up in Halden, southern Norway and studied mathematics, physics, and chemistry at the University of Oslo. In 1962, she was hired to be a programmer at the Norwegian Computing Center (NCC), a research institute established by the Norwegian Research Council for Science and Technology in 1952. Initially, she worked in administrative data processing and programmed banking systems. She was also known to be among the first programmers in Norway to use the COBOL language.

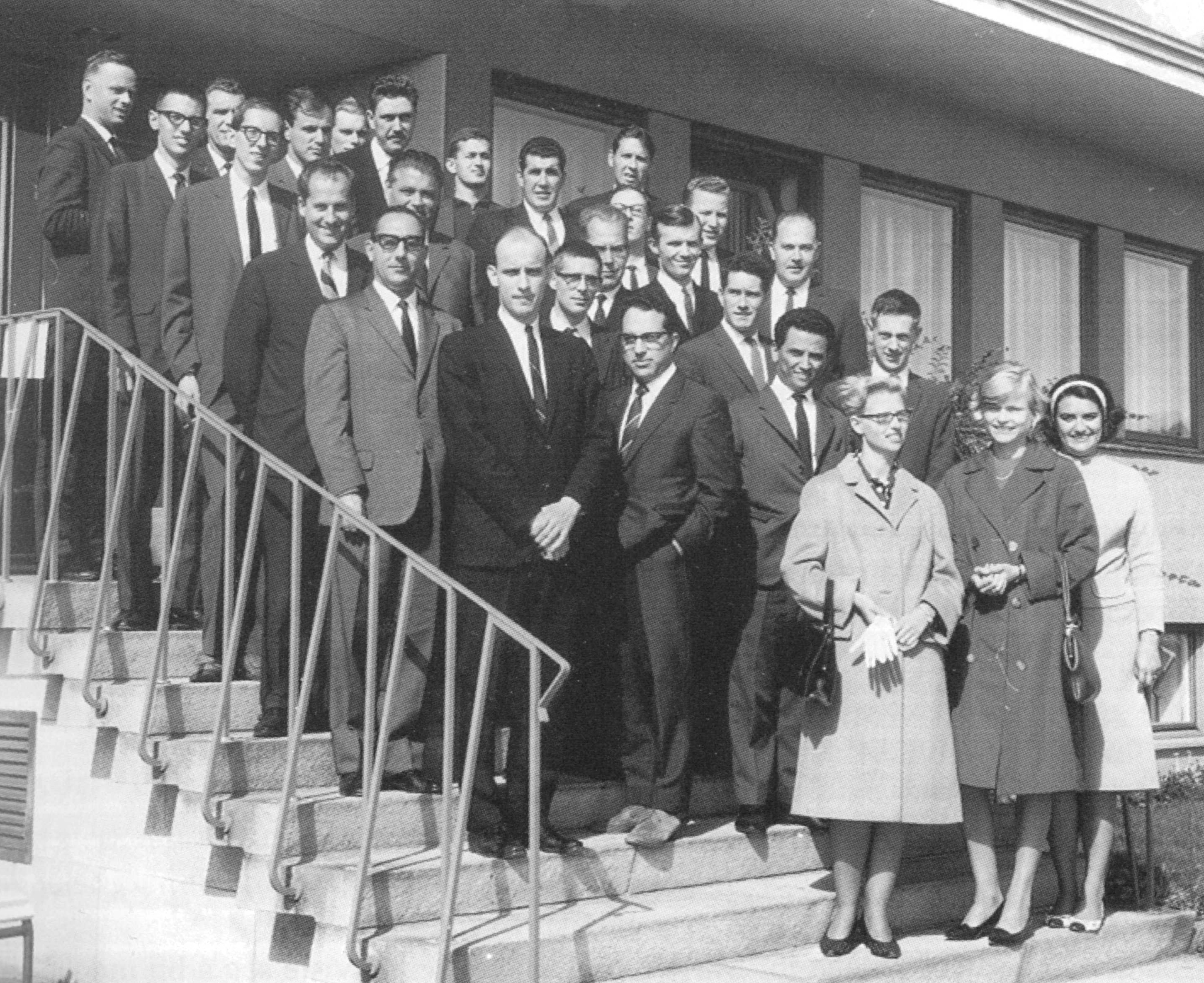
Visit to the Norwegian Computer Science Centre's UNIVAC 1107 from the USA and several European countries, summer 1964. First from the left in the top row is Kristen Nygaard, second from the right in the bottom row is Drude Berntsen.

In 1968, she was selected to head NCC’s Department for Administrative Data Processing, only six years after starting work there as a programmer. The following year, she was nominated by the staff to fill the post of Director of the NCC. She successfully acquired that post and continued to lead the organization for more than two decades.

In 1990, Berntsen became director of the Council for Natural Science Research in the Norwegian Research Council for Science and the Humanities (NAVF), with responsibility for the system that allocates funds to basic natural science research in Norway. She contributed to the upgrading of information technology to a separate discipline in NAVF. In 1993, Berntsen took over as Director of the Research Department at the National Insurance Administration, with responsibility for statistics, research and analysis, as well as budgeting for the National Insurance Scheme.

== Selected works ==
- Berntsen, Drude. "The pioneer era in Norwegian scientific computing (1948–1962)." In IFIP Conference on History of Nordic Computing, pp. 23-32. Boston, MA: Springer US, 2003.
- Berntsen, Drude. The Many Dimensions of Kristen Nygaard, Creator of Object-Oriented Programming and the Scandinavian School of System Development.
