= Eidsvollsbygningen =

Coordinates: 60°18′04″N 11°10′18″E

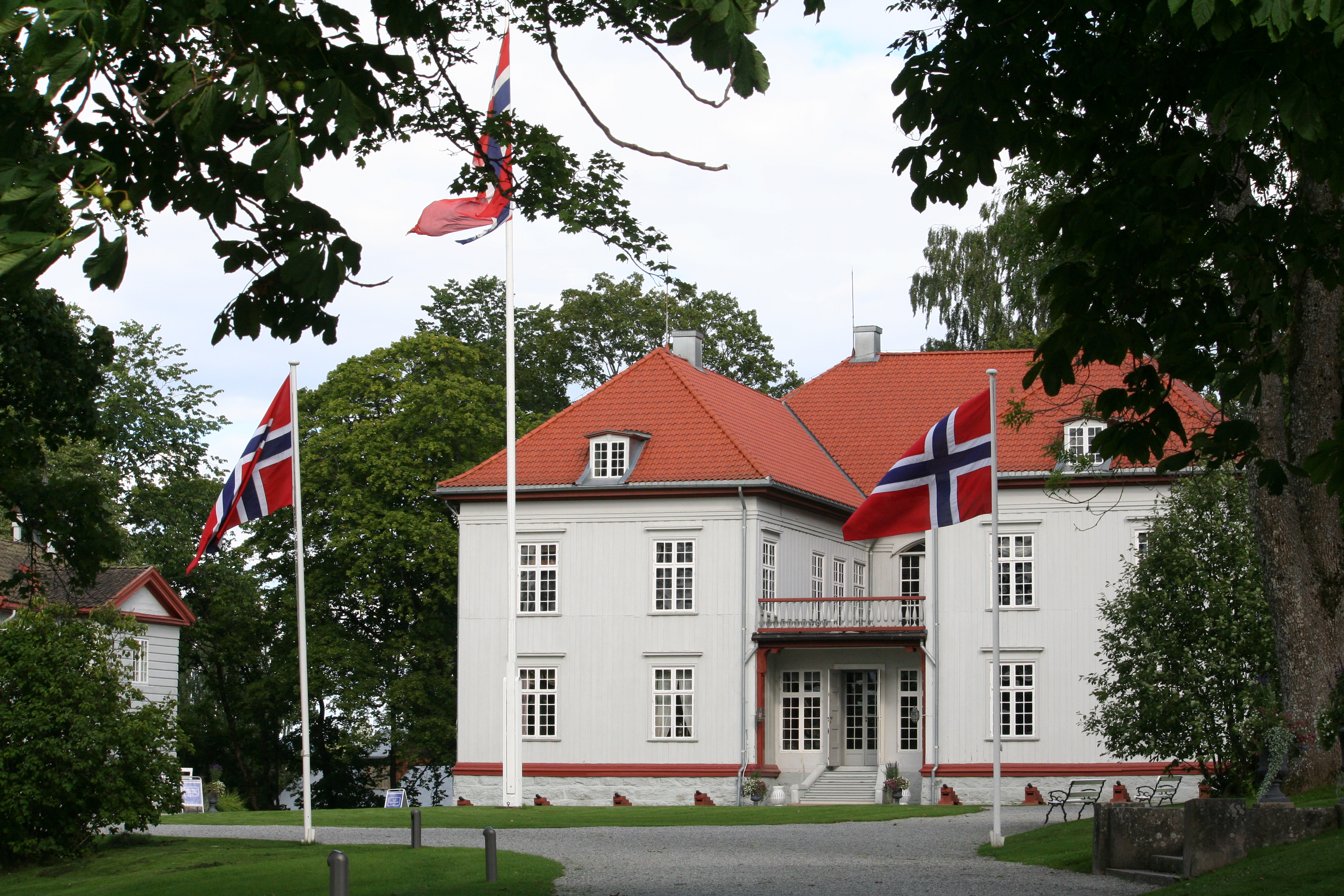
- Eidsvollsbygningen at Eidsvollsparken

General information
- Town or city: Eidsvoll
- Country: Norway
- Construction started: 1770
- Completed: 1811
- Owner: 1794-1823: Carsten Anker, 1823-1851: British creditors, 1851-present: The Norwegian Government

Eidsvollsbygningen (Literally: The Eidsvoll building) is a historic manor house located at Eidsvoll in Akershus county, Norway. The building is where the Constitution of Norway was signed on 17 May 1814. The estate is now owned by The State of Norway and is an official national monument, as well as a museum.

== History ==
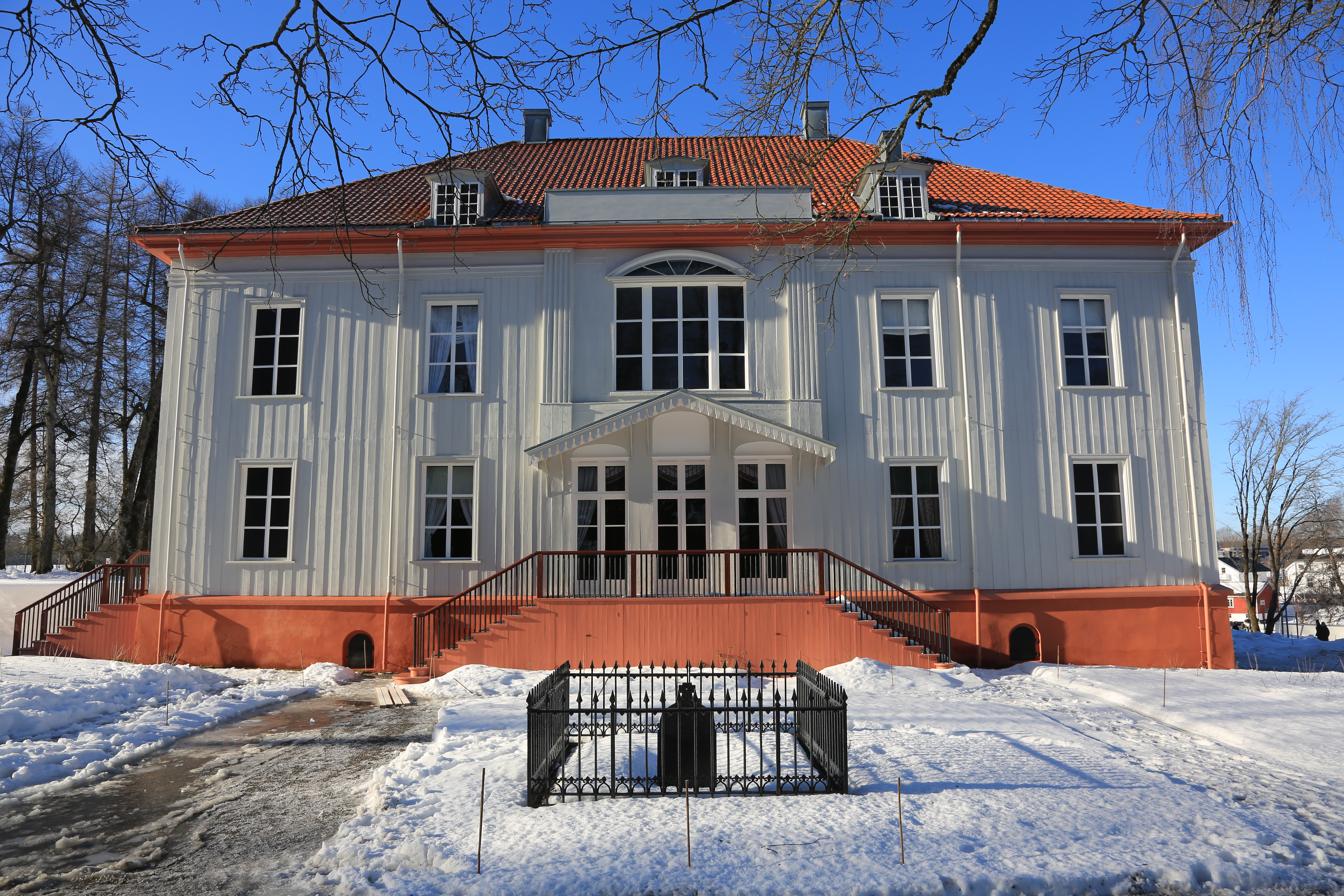
Eidsvollbygningen Winter 2014

The building was first constructed in 1770 with a total floor area of over 2000 square metres. Around 1800 Carsten Anker bought the building. He renovated the manor house and he and his family were living there when the Constitution was signed. Carsten Anker went bankrupt in 1822 and the ownership of the estate was transferred to various British creditors in 1823. A group of private citizens led by Henrik Wergeland organized a fundraiser that allowed them to buy the building with the pavilion and surrounding garden (Eidsvollsparken). After the purchase was finalized in 1851, the group donated the property to the Norwegian State.

== Renovations ==
The manor has been renovated since Carsten Anker and his family lived there and now has become a museum. In 1895, there was a major effort with repairs and maintenance for the 100th anniversary of the signing of the constitution (100 års-jubileet for Grunnloven). In 1964, plans were made for a new restoration for the 150th anniversary celebration of the Constitution (150-årsjubileet for Grunnloven). Both renovations had the objective of furnishing Eidsvollbygningen in the style of its appearance in 1814.

A new renovation and restoration was started in 2011 by Statsbygg on behalf of the Ministry of Culture. The aim of the renovation was to have the building laid out and redesigned to make it look as close as possible to what it looked like in 1814 to further immerse the audience in a more authentic experience. The project was completed for the 200th Jubilee of the Constitution (Grunnlovsjubileet) in 2014.

== Gallery ==
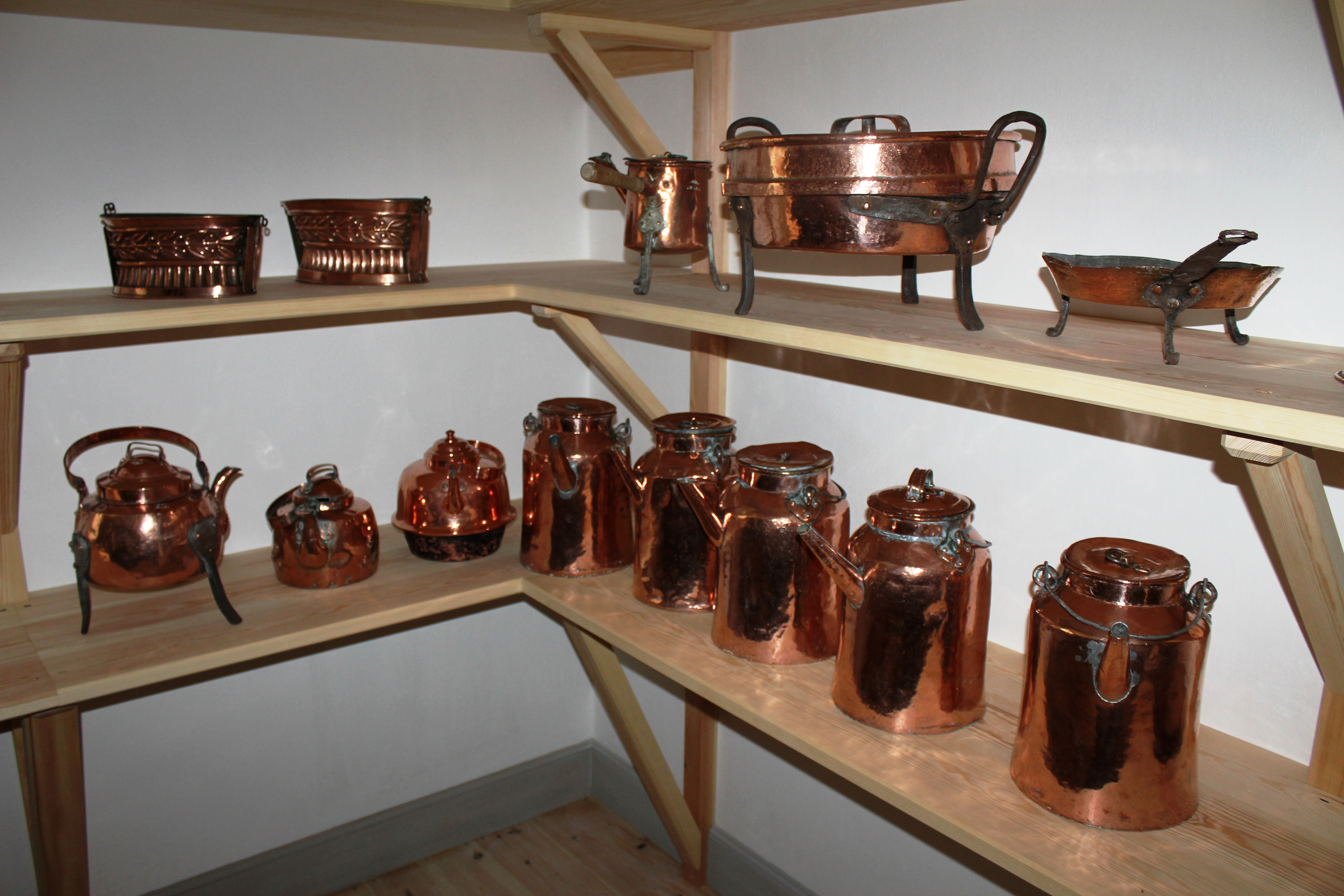
Copper cookware

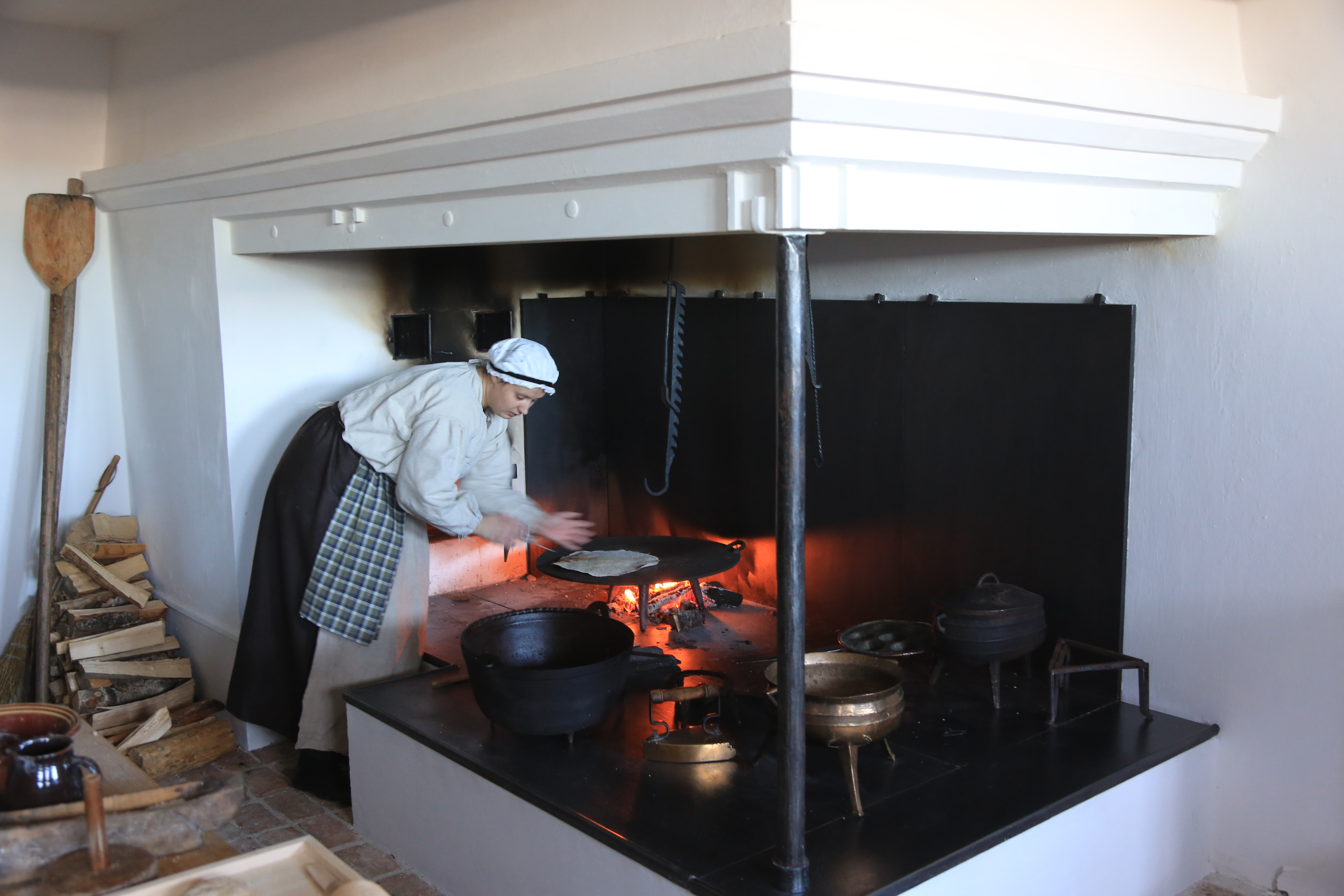
Kitchen of Eidsvollsbygningen

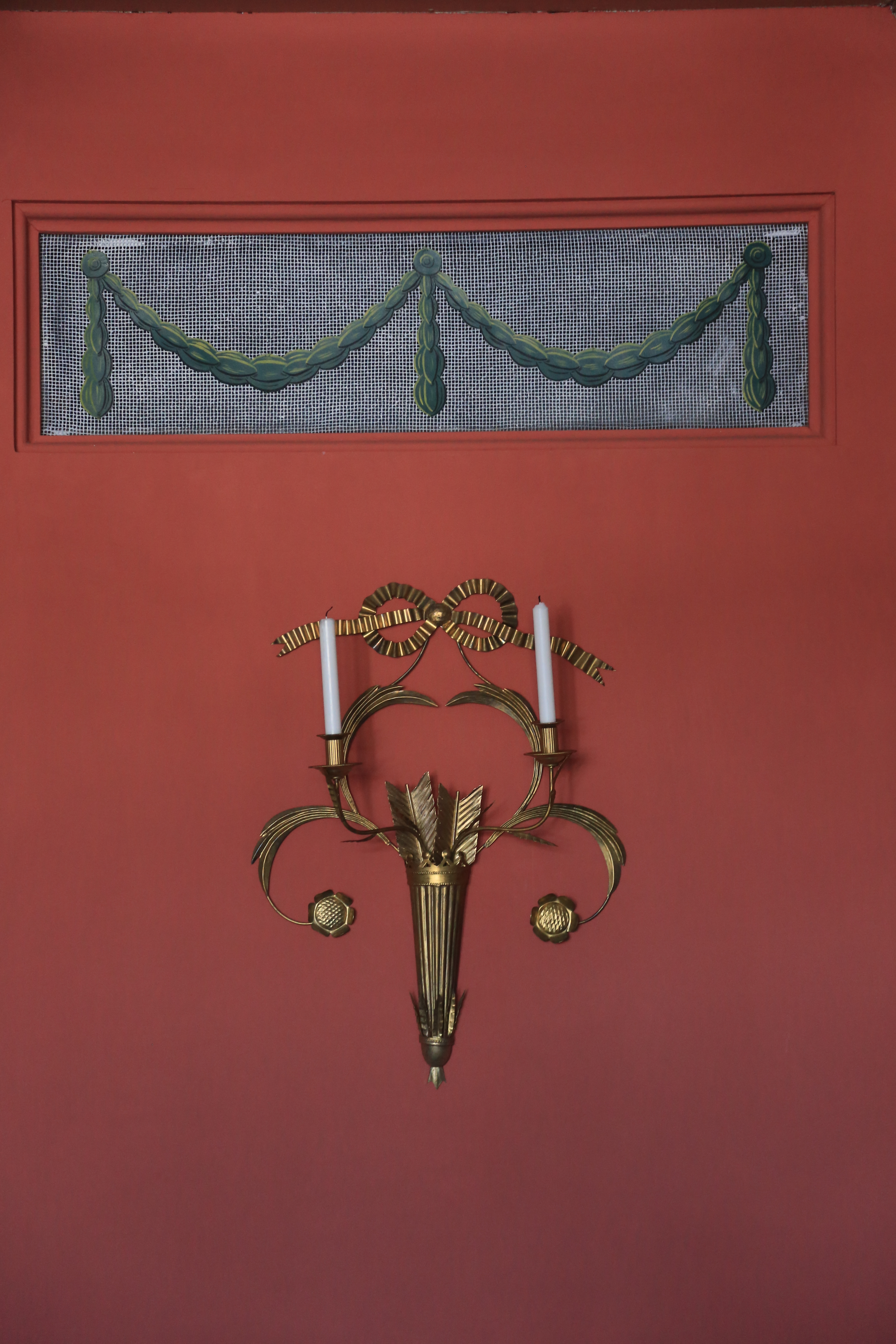
Candles in the entrance hall

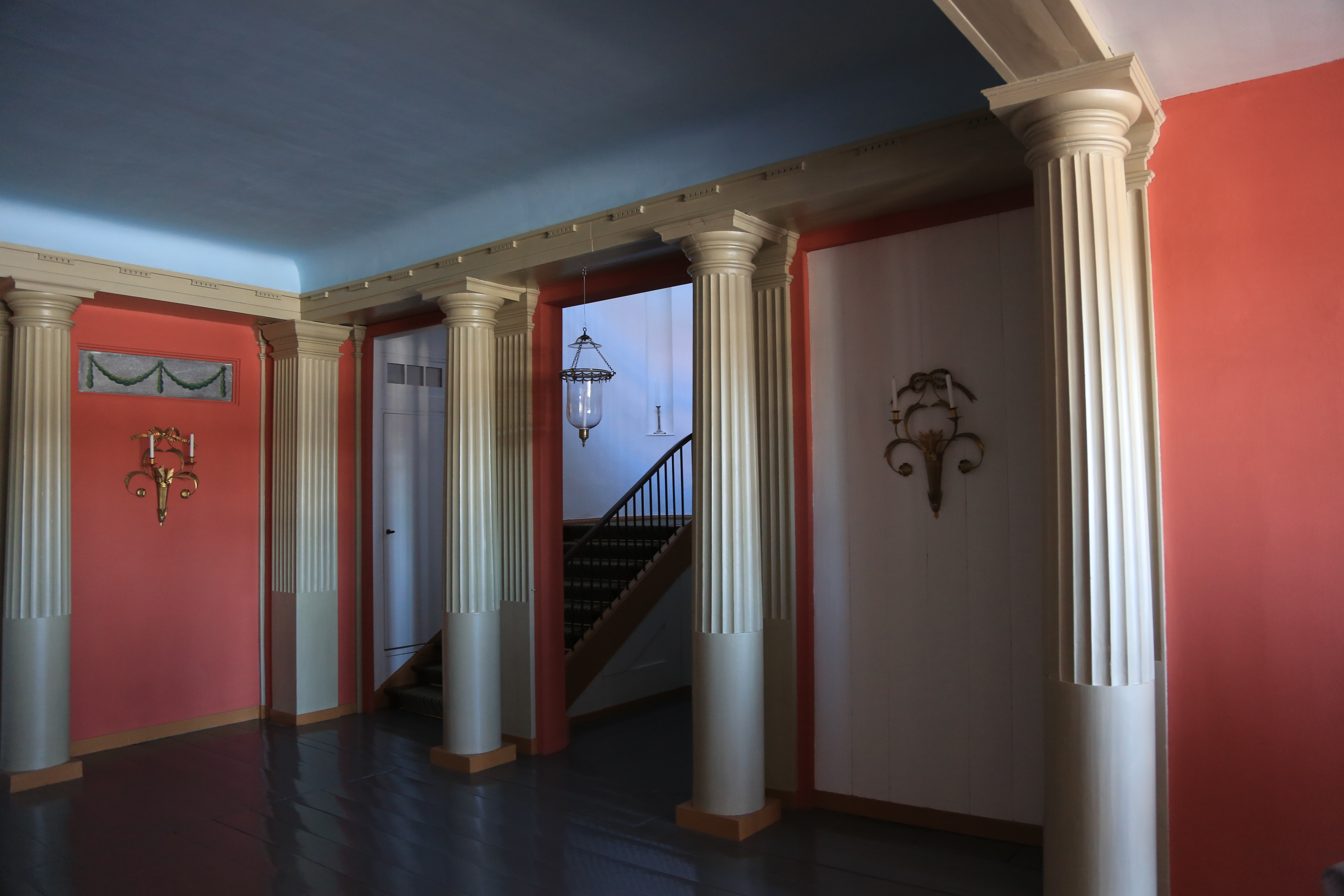
Entrance hall

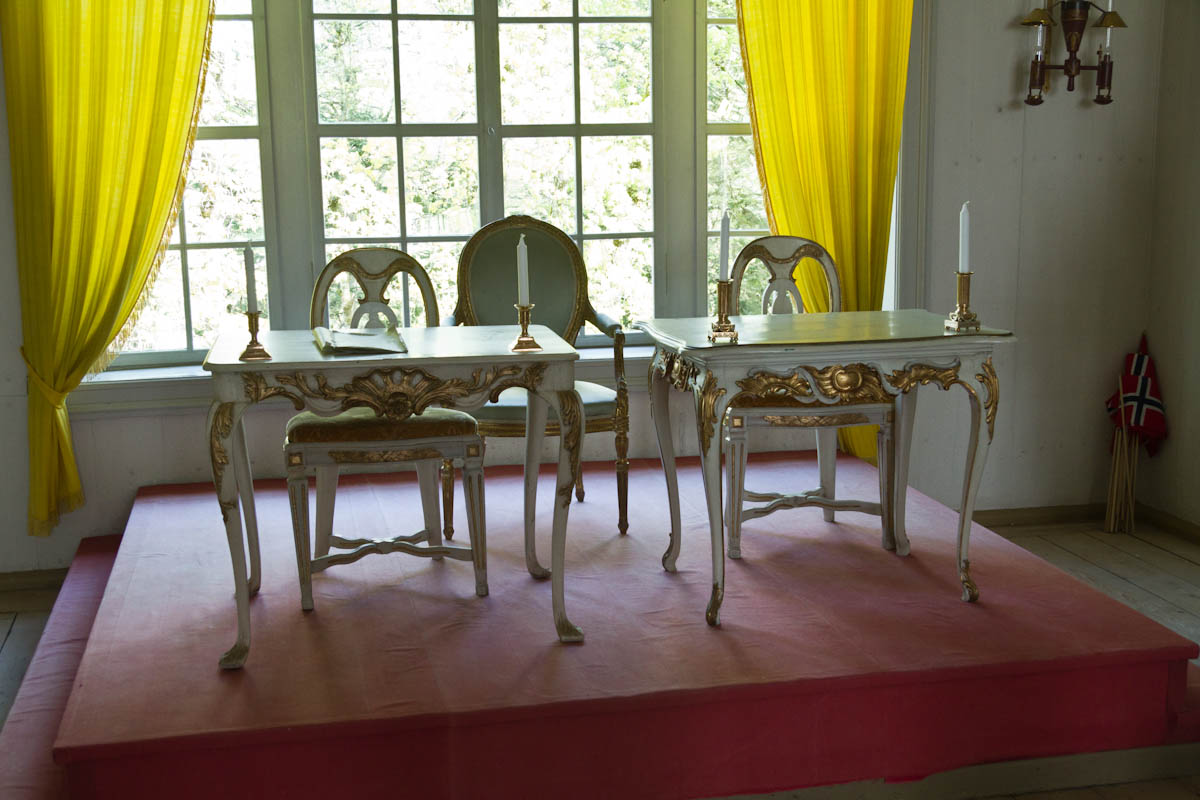
Table on the podium at the National Assembly

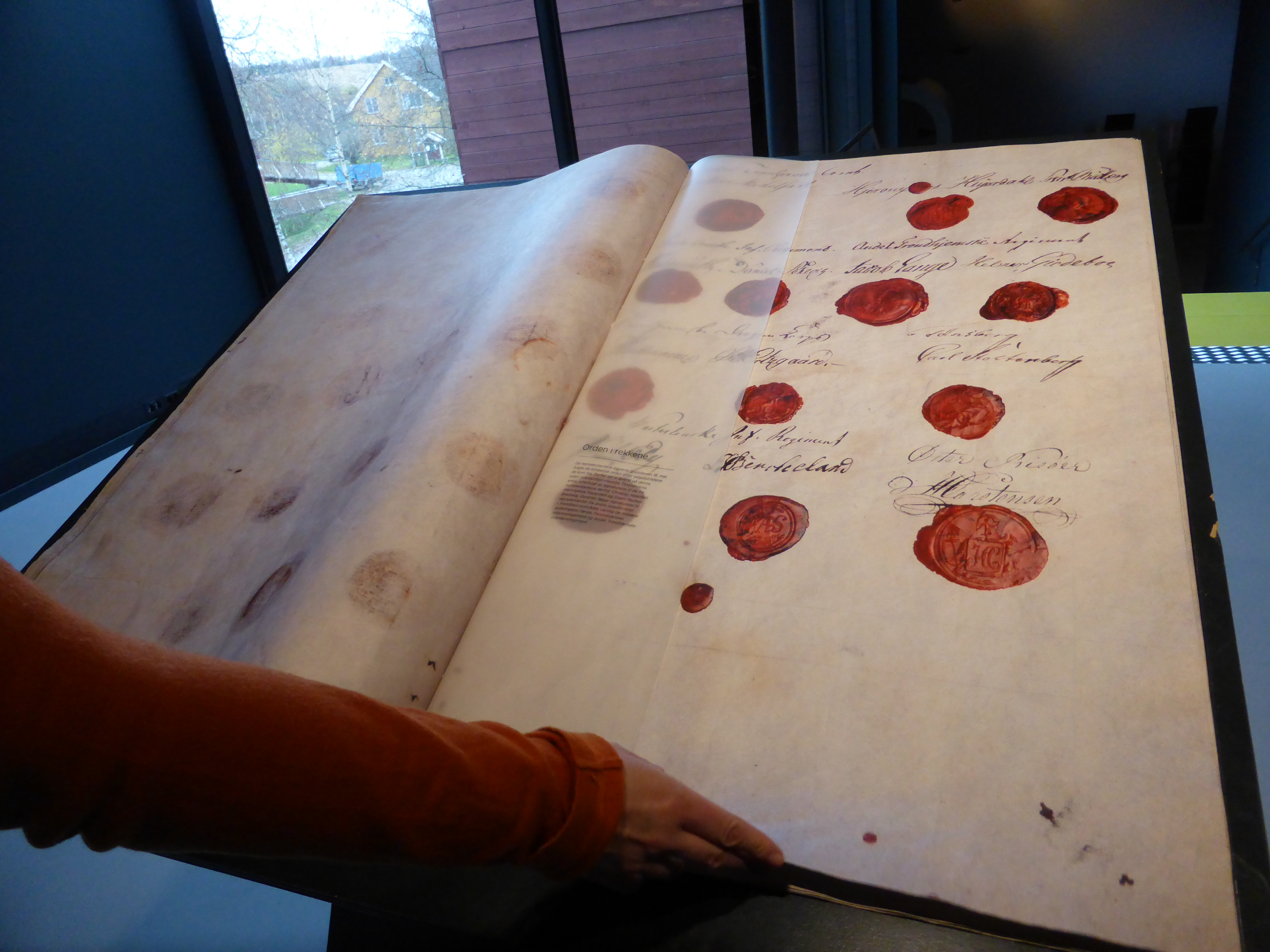
Facsimile copy of Norway's 1814 Constitution on display at Eidsvollsbygningen

== Other sources ==
- Risåsen, Geir Thomas (2005) Eidsvollsbygningen: Carsten Anker og Grunnlovens hus (Oslo: Damm forlag) ISBN 82-04-09489-2
- Holme, Jørn (2014) De kom fra alle kanter - Eidsvollsmennene og deres hus (Oslo: Cappelen Damm) ISBN 978-82-02-44564-5
