= Carsten Anker =

Norwegian businessman, civil servant and politician

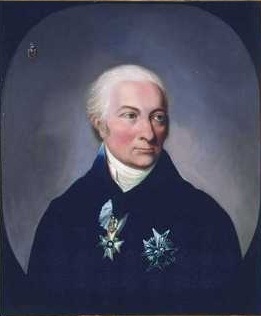
Portrait of Carsten Anker, 1869

Carsten Tank Anker (17 November 1747 – 13 March 1824) was a Norwegian businessman, civil servant, politician and one of the Fathers of the Constitution of Norway. He was the owner of the manor house in Akershus at which the original National Assembly (Riksforsamlingen) of Norway was held. The manor house has since then been given the name Eidsvollsbygningen.

== Early years ==
Born in Frederikshald, he was the son of the trader Erik Ancher (1709–1785) and cousin of Bernt Anker. In 1759 Carsten left on a journey abroad that was to last for several years, together with his brother Peter and four cousins from Christiania. From 1771 to 1772 he was an envoy from several of the major Norwegian trading companies in Stockholm to negotiate better conditions for the timber trade on the river Klarälven, without much success. While in Sweden, however, there arose suspicion that he was also working with a secret, political agenda, and when Gustav III conducted his coup d'état, Anker was asked by the government in Copenhagen to return.

== Civil service career ==
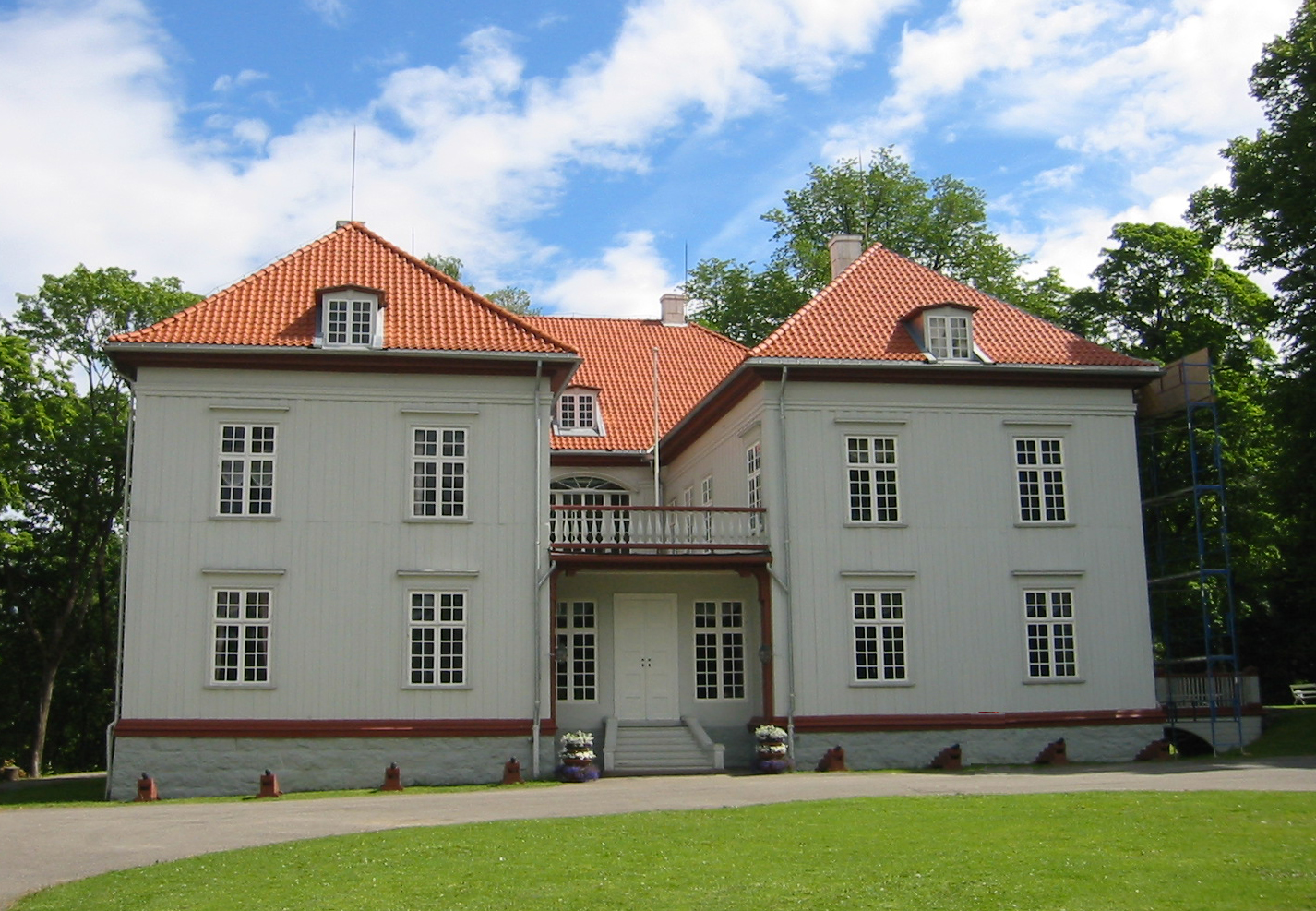
Eidsvoll Manor in Akershus

He then started his career as a civil servant. On 10 May 1774 he was appointed secretary in the General-Landøkonomi- og Kommercekollegiet (College of General Rural Economy and Commerce), in 1776 he was made justisråd, in 1781 third deputy of the Bjærgværksdirektoiret (Mining Directory) and in 1784 second deputy. He was given the (mostly honorary) titles of etatsråd and konferensråd in 1779 and 1784 respectively, and on 14 January 1779 he was also made a member of the nobility. When Bjærgværksdirektoiret was dissolved by royal resolution on 28 January 1791, Anker was given a pension, but kept a position as first director of the so-called Realisations-Kommission (Realisation Committee). This position entailed among other things special responsibility for the government's Norwegian glassmaking companies. In 1792 he was made first director of the Danish Asia Company, a position he held until 1811. He also acquired considerable property in Norway by buying the historic Eidsvoll Ironworks (Eidsvoll Verk). He was elected a Fellow of the Royal Society in 1804.

== Time abroad ==
As an envoy of the Danish Asia Company, he stayed in London from January 1805 to take care of the company's business affairs vis-à-vis the English East India Company. This task he seems to have performed in an excellent manner. In 1807 he carried out a large transaction of money for the government in Hamburg, and finalised a deal in ship timber for the navy. In 1811 he took up permanent residence at Eidsvoll Ironworks.

== Friendship with Christian Frederik of Denmark ==
During his stay in Copenhagen, he had become an intimate acquaintance of the heir presumptive to the throne, Christian Frederik. When the prince arrived in Norway as stattholder in 1813, Anker was immediately made one of the prince's closest advisors. After the Treaty of Kiel the prince held a meeting at Eidsvoll during his journey to Trondheim, and on the way back he convened the Meeting of Notables of Eidsvoll on 16 February 1814, where it was decided that Norway should declare its independence, and that a National Assembly should be convened, also to be held at Eidsvoll.

== National Assembly of 1814 ==
Before the National Assembly gathered, Anker had left Norway, and could therefore not take up his position in the new Norwegian government, where he was appointed councillor of government for the 5th Ministry (economy) on 2 March, and councillor of state on 19 May. In March 1814 he crossed the North Sea to promote Norway's interests in England; he worked to put the interests of Sweden and the great powers up against each other, but achieved little. In 1815 he was dismissed as councillor of state, and returned to Norway, where he developed a close relationship to the crown prince Karl Johan.

== Last years ==
In the last years of his life Anker's finances were not good; the ironworks was virtually closed down. Yet he continued to administer the government's glassmaking companies, and died during a visit to the glassworks at Biri. He had literary interests, acted as a patron, and had a large collection of manuscripts and books. In 1784 he married Hedvig Caroline Ernestine Christine Wegener (1763–1846).
