= Dyrebeskyttelsen Norge =

Norwegian animal welfare charity

Logo.

Dyrebeskyttelsen Norge ("The Norwegian Society for Protection of Animals") is a charity in Norway that promotes animal welfare.

It was established as Foreningen til Dyrenes Beskyttelse ("Association for Animal Protection") on 17 October in 1859. In 1985 it incorporated Foreningen Dyrenes Beskytter ("Association Animal protector") (founded 1893) and changed its name to Dyrenes Beskyttelse ("Animal Protection"). in 1992 it incorporated Norges Dyrevernforbund ("Norway's Animal Welfare Association") and changed its name to Dyrebeskyttelsen Norge ("The Norwegian Society for Protection of Animals"). Chair of the board is Anne-Lise Skoie Risøen, and the organizational headquarters are in Gamle Oslo.
