= Åsmund L. Strømnes =

Norwegian educationalist

Åsmund Lønning Strømnes (14 October 1927 – 3 December 2009) was a Norwegian educationalist.

He was born in Trondenes, and graduated from Volda Teacher's College in 1951. He worked ten years as a teacher before enrolling at the University of Oslo. He has a Doctor of Philosophy degree from the University of Oslo (1968), and worked as a docent there from 1970 to 1973. He was a professor at the University of Tromsø from 1973 to 1985 and at the University of Trondheim (from 1996: Norwegian University of Science and Technology) from 1985 to 1997. He was a dean during his time in Tromsø. He was given the honorary degree at Uppsala University in 2007, and was a fellow of the Royal Norwegian Society of Sciences and Letters. From 1985 to 2008 he edited the Scandinavian Journal of Educational Research.

Strømnes was a co-founder of the Norwegian Social Science Data Services, and was its first chairman of the board from 1971 to 1974. He has also been a member of the council NAVF. After retiring, he moved to Eidsvoll where he worked with local history. He died on 3 December 2009.
