= Hurdalsjøen =

Lake in Akershus county, Norway

Hurdalssjøen
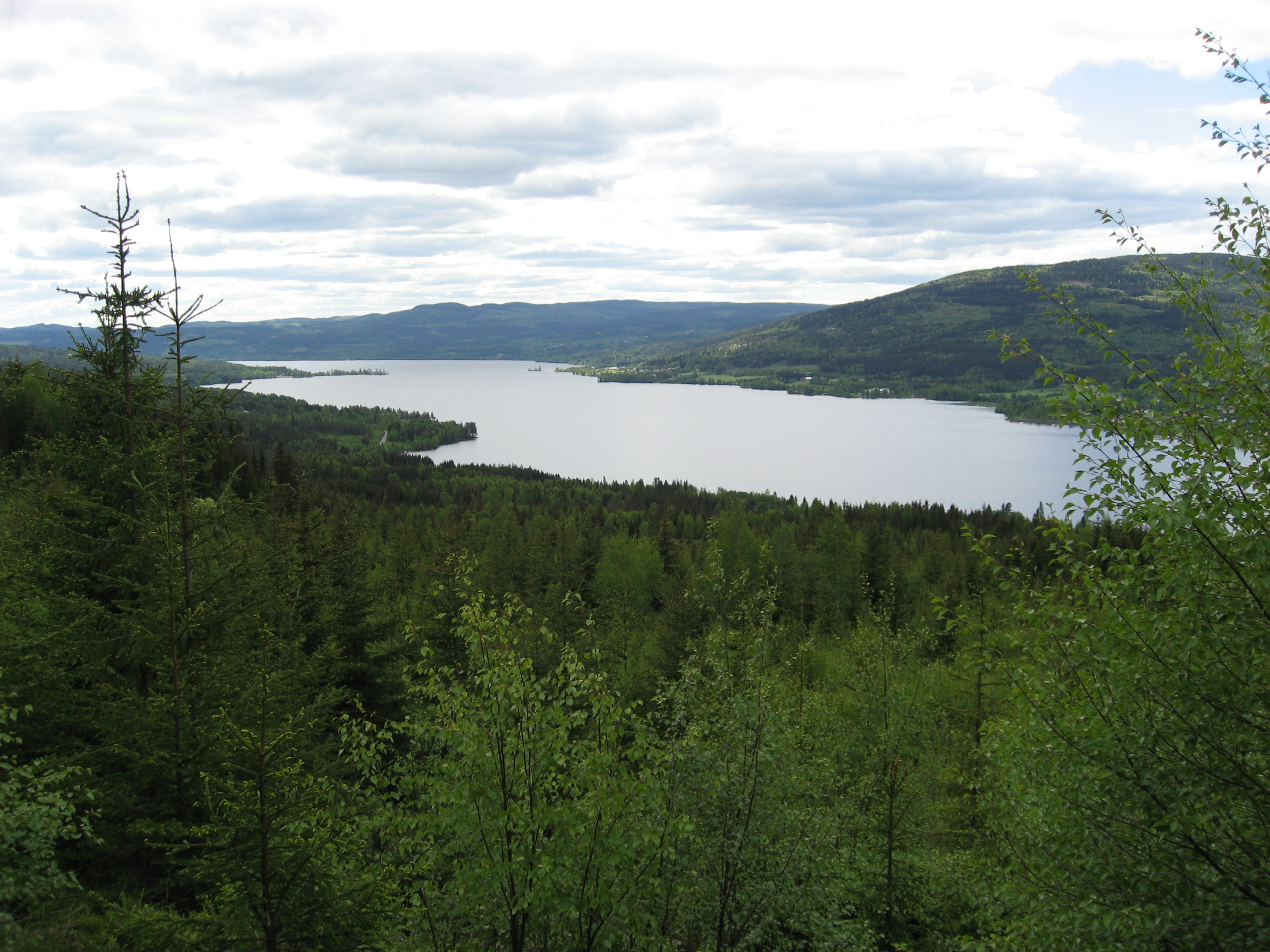

- Location within Norway
- Location: Hurdal, Eidsvoll, Nannestad
- Coordinates: 60°18′36″N 11°6′16″E
- Type: glacier lake, moraine-dammed
- Primary inflows: Gjødingelva, Hegga, Horna, Hurdalselva and Steinsjøelva
- Primary outflows: Andelva
- Catchment area: 584.74 km^{2} (225.77 sq mi)
- Basin countries: Norway
- Max. length: 19.2 km (11.9 mi)
- Max. width: 3 km (1.9 mi)
- Surface area: 33.20 km^{2} (12.82 sq mi)
- Average depth: 26 m (85 ft)
- Max. depth: 60 m (200 ft)
- Water volume: 0.862 km^{3} (0.207 cu mi)
- Shore length^{1}: 45 km (28 mi)
- Surface elevation: 176 m (577 ft)
- References: NVE
- ^{1} Shore length is not a well-defined measure.

Hurdalssjøen is a lake in the municipalities of Hurdal, Eidsvoll and Nannestad in Akershus county, Norway.

== See also ==
- List of lakes in Norway
