= Sundt =

Sundt is a Norwegian surname. Notable people with the surname include:

- Arthur Sundt (1899–1971), Norwegian politician;
- Egil Sundt (1903–1950), Norwegian lawyer and civil servant;
- Eilert Sundt (1817–1875), Norwegian theologist and sociologist;
- Guy Sundt (1898–1955), American athlete, coach and athletics administrator;
- Halfdan Sundt (1873–1951), Norwegian physician and politician;
- Harald Sundt (1873–1952), Norwegian businessman;
- Michael Andreas Sundt, Norwegian politician;
- Morten Ludvig Sundt (1809–1891), Norwegian farmer and politician;
- Petter C. G. Sundt (1945–2007), Norwegian businessman;
- Vigleik Trygve Sundt (1873–1948), Norwegian lawyer, genealogist and politician.

== See also ==
- Carl Sundt-Hansen (1841–1907), Norwegian-Danish painter
- Sundt Air, a Norwegian airline
