= Hoffstad =

Hoffstad is a surname of Norwegian origin. Notable people with the surname include:

- Arne Hoffstad (1900–1980), Norwegian newspaper editor and politician
- Einar Hoffstad (1894–1959), Norwegian encyclopedist, newspaper editor, writer and economist
- Olaf Alfred Hoffstad (1865–1943), Norwegian botanist, writer, educator and politician
