= Leif Rode =

Norwegian rower (1885–1967)

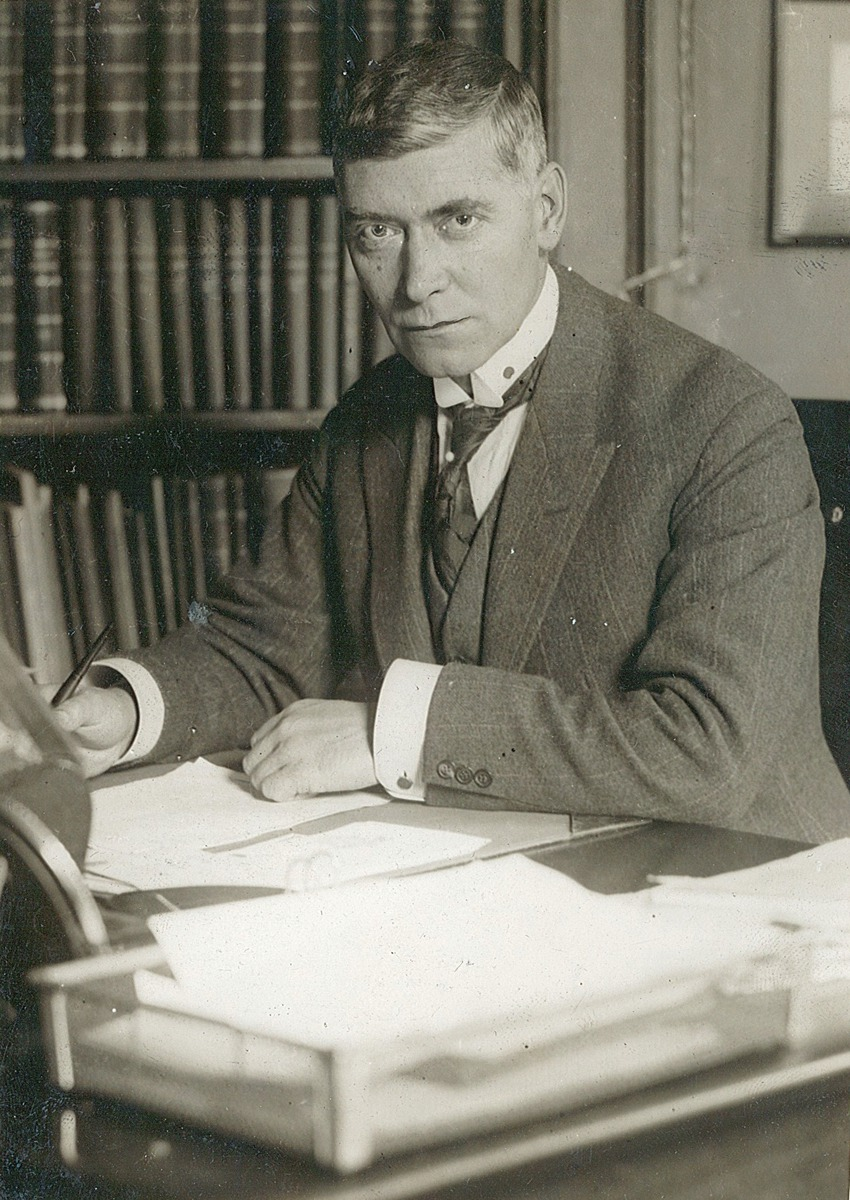
- Rode in the 1930s
- Born: 27 January 1885; Kristiania, Norway
- Died: 2 November 1967 (aged 82)
- Occupations: competitive rower, jurist, sports official, poet and playwright

Leif Sundt Rode (27 January 1885 – 2 November 1967) was a Norwegian competitive rower, jurist, sports official, poet and playwright.

== Personal life ==
Rode was born in Kristiania as the son of physician Emil Ferdinand Rode (1825–1921) and Ragna Louise Drejer Sundt (1857–1909). He was a maternal grandson of Lauritz Sundt, and thus a great-grandnephew of Eilert Sundt and first cousin once removed of Harald, Halfdan and Vigleik Sundt.

He married Anna Sundt Bøckmann Puntervold Falkenberg, a maternal granddaughter of Tønnes Puntervold, in 1911. He died in Oslo in November 1967.

== Career ==
Rode finished his secondary education in 1903, and graduated with the cand.jur. degree in 1908. While a student he joined the sports club Norske Studenters RK. He became a competitive rower, and competed in coxed fours at the 1912 Summer Olympics in Stockholm. At the end of his active career he served as a sports administrator, as chairman of his club from 1913, and board member of the National rowing federation from 1914. He was president of Norges Riksforbund for Idræt from 1918 to 1919, and of Norges Landsforbund for Idræt from 1925 to 1930. He chaired the Association for the Promotion of Skiing from 1951 to 1953.

He was a barrister at the Eidsivating Court of Appeal from 1933 to 1945. During the German occupation, in his role as a barrister, he appeared at the defence in German courts-martial. He contributed to the civil resistance through the establishment of the "sports front". After the war he took part as defender in the legal purge, and was a barrister at the Supreme Court of Norway from 1945 to 1955.

Rode published a song book in 1928, the poetry collection Men det steg en grotid in 1945, and the non-fiction book Forsvareren i praksis in 1949. His audio play Bevisbyrden was aired in 1950.

Sporting positions
Preceded by Johan Sverre	Chairman of the Norges Riksforbund for Idræt; 1918–1919	Succeeded by Hjalmar Krag
Preceded by Hjalmar Krag	Chairman of the Norges Landsforbund for Idræt; 1930–1932	Succeeded by Jørgen Martinius Jensen
Preceded by Ole Bøhn	Chairman of the Association for the Promotion of Skiing; 1951–1953	Succeeded by Carl Chr. Lange
