= Halfdan Sundt =

Norwegian physician and politician (1873–1951)

Halfdan Sundt (12 August 1873 – 18 January 1951) was a Norwegian physician and politician. He was the president of the Norwegian Medical Association.

== Personal life ==
He was born in Farsund as a son of consul Peter Ingvard Sundt (1841–1917) and his wife Anna Christiane Salvesen. He was a triplet brother of physician Vigleik Trygve Sundt. He was a grandnephew of Eilert Sundt, nephew of Lauritz Sundt, first cousin once removed of Karen and Einar Sundt, first cousin of Harald Sundt and third cousin of Arthur Sundt.

In September 1903 in Eidsvoll he married merchant's daughter Rebekka Heitmann.

== Career ==
He finished his secondary education in 1892, and graduated with the cand.med. degree in 1900. He was a municipal physician in Gol Municipality from 1903 to 1908, physician in Vadsø Municipality from 1908 to 1911, then from 1911 to 1943 chief physician in Stavern. In 1920 he took the dr.med. degree with a thesis on the Legg–Calvé–Perthes syndrome. He was a freelance researcher after his retirement from the hospital in Stavern. From 1933 to 1935 he was the president of the Norwegian Medical Association, and from 1937 to 1945 he chaired Nationalforeningen mot tuberkulose.

He was a city council member for Vadsø Municipality, and from 1914 to 1922 in Stavern. He was also a member of Stavern school board for 15 years. He died in January 1951 in Stavern.
