= Vigleik Trygve Sundt =

Norwegian attorney, genealogist and politician

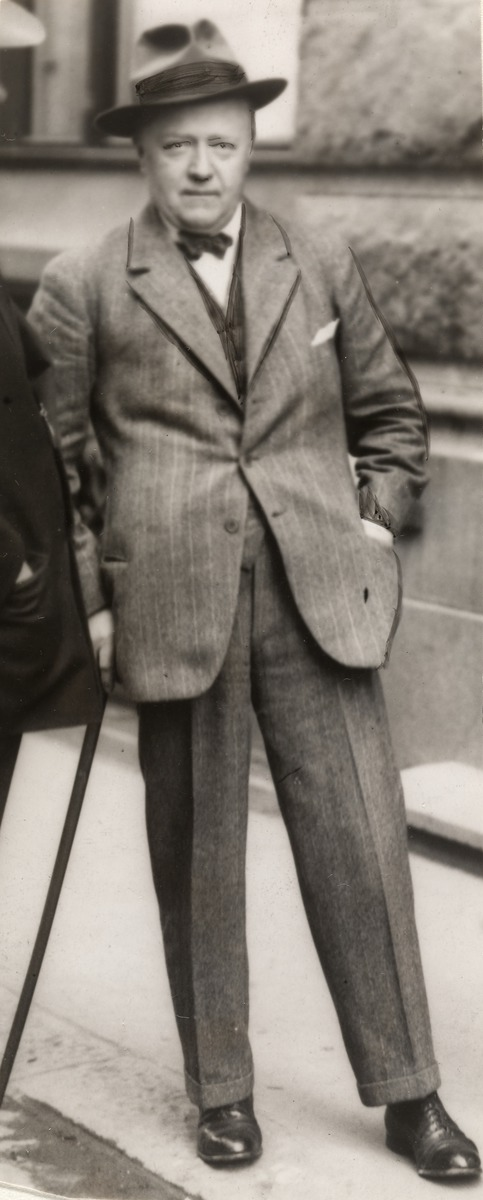
Vigleik in the 1930s

Vigleik Trygve Sundt (12 August 1873 – 23 August 1948) was a Norwegian attorney, genealogist and politician for the Liberal Party.

== Personal life ==
He was born in Farsund as a son of consul Peter Ingvard Sundt (1841–1917) and his wife Anna Christiane Salvesen. He was a triplet brother of physician Halfdan Sundt. He was a grandnephew of Eilert Sundt, nephew of Lauritz Sundt, first cousin once removed of Karen and Einar Sundt, first cousin of Harald Sundt and third cousin of Arthur Sundt.

In March 1905 in Fredrikshald he married major's daughter Alethe Elisabeth Anker (1874–1932).

== Career ==
He finished his secondary education in 1892, and graduated with the cand.jur. degree in 1897 together with his brother Bjarne. After serving as a deputy judge in Nordre Østerdalen from 1898 to 1900 and junior solicitor in Kristiania from 1900 to 1902, he opened the law firm Sundt & Sundt together with his brother in 1902. After Bjarne died in 1906, Vigleik took his younger brother Rolf on board as partner in the firm. Rolf left in 1930. In 1931 the company Sundt & Sundt was dissolved and he continued on his own. He was also a legal consultant for LKAB from 1904 to 1915.

He was a Southern Norway patriot, a national romantic strongly rooted in the 1890s Liberal oppositional tradition, and a "European liberal". He was a member of Oslo city council from 1917 to 1919 and again from 1932 to 1937, and stood for parliamentary election for the party in 1924 and 1933 (first ballot candidate) without being elected.

He was a board member of Venstres Hus, the party-affiliated newspaper Dagbladet, and the theatre Det Norske Teatret from 1925 to 1947 (chairman since 1935). He was also a co-founder in 1926, and from 1940 to 1947 board member of, the Norwegian Genealogical Society. He published extensively in their journal Norsk slektshistorisk tidsskrift as well as in the newspaper Dagbladet. Other works include the biographical sketch of Povel Juel in Norsk biografisk leksikon as well as an unfinished monography about the same person. In the business world, he was a board member of Bratsberg Bruk, Saudefaldene, Flørli Kraft- og Elektrosmelteverk and Laatefos; mostly hydroelectric power companies. He was a supervisory council member from 1928 to 1930 and deputy board member from 1930 to 1932 in Vinmonopolet.

He was decorated as a Knight, First Class of the Order of St. Olav. He died in August 1948 at Rikshospitalet.

Cultural offices
Preceded by Nils Sletbak	Chairman of Det Norske Teatret; 1935–1947	Succeeded by Asgaut Steinnes
