= Harald Sundt =

Norwegian businessperson

Harald Sundt (16 March 1873 – 9 September 1952) was a Norwegian businessperson.

== Personal life ==
He was born in Kristiania as a son of wholesaler Oluf Christian Carl Sundt (1834–1891) and his wife Lydia Jeanette Dahl (1843–1891). He was a paternal grandson of Peter Albrecht Sundt (1796–1847), and thus a grandnephew of Eilert Sundt, first cousin once removed of writer Karen Sundt and publisher Einar Sundt, nephew of industrialist Lauritz Sundt and first cousin of Halfdan and Vigleik Sundt.

In 1900 he married landowner's daughter Thea Ingier.

== Career ==
After finishing Kristiania Commerce School, Sundt started a business career. He was a partner in N. S. Beer & Co. for some years. He was a board member of Greaker Cellulosefabrik, M. & H. Ingier, Oslo Smørfabrik, Aug. Pellerin Fils & Co., Oslo Sparebank, Den norske Naglefabrik, and Det norske Myrselskap. He chaired the supervisory council of De Forenede Nagle- og Skruefabriker and was a supervisory council member of Forsikringsselskapet Norden. Elektrisk Bureau and Nationaltheatret.

From 1917 he lived at Gamle Madserud allé 37, in a mansion designed by Christian von Munthe af Morgenstierne and still known as "Sundtvillaen". In 1908 he established the architectural award Sundts premie for fremragende arkitektur. In 1930 he became an honorary member of Oslo Architects' Association. He also chaired Selskabet for Oslo Byes Vel.

He died in September 1952 and was buried at Vår Frelsers gravlund.
