= Ramfos Tresliperi =

Norwegian wood pulp company

- Formerly: Ramfos Træsliberi
- Company type: Aksjeselskap
- Industry: Wood pulp
- Founded: 1889
- Defunct: 1928
- Headquarters: Modum, Buskerud, Norway
- Products: Wood pulp

Ramfos Tresliperi was an industrial company that produced wood pulp in Modum. The company was established in 1889, the factory was put into operation in 1890, and it closed in 1928.

== History ==
Ramfos Tresliperi was established in 1889 with offices in Drammen and a mill in Modum. The mill was raised at the Ramfossen waterfall in the Snarum River, a few kilometers below Krøderen. Although Ramfos lay remote compared with other wood-processing plants in Modum, its location had a great advantage in that the Krøderen Line had been built nearby.

The initiator of the project was Elling Ellingsen of Drammen, joined by Thomas Bang and Iver Albert Juel, also of Drammen. The factory was equipped with four grinding machines and auxiliary machinery, each driven by its own turbine. The auxiliary machinery included hydraulic presses, a crosscut circular saw, a barking machine, sorting machines, and board machines, and a six-horsepower steam engine was also installed.

Ellingsen, Bang, and Juel raised 359,000 kroner in share capital to build the factory and begin operations at Ramfos in 1890. The same year they started, wood pulp prices began to fall. Several measures were taken to counter the drop, including the founding of the organization Den Norske Tremasseforening in 1890. Another way Norwegian mill owners countered the downturn was to lease out the operation of their pulp factories to foreign operators; in the 1890s British paper manufacturers took over operations at several Norwegian pulp plants, as at Ramfos, which was leased to Thomas Owen & Co. of Cardiff from 1893 to 1902, giving the British control over several links in the production chain. The mill was taken over again by Ellingsen in 1902.

== Production and modernization ==
For its time, the capacity of the grinding machines at Ramfos was very large. Ramfos produced 9,000 tonnes on four machines, while Embretsfos produced 10,000 tonnes on eight. With such grinding capacity the company could be run with fewer employees than other producers of comparable output: in 1890 Ramfos had 30 employees, while Embretsfos had 90. Ramfos was thus a good plant, and its product, the wood pulp, won much praise.

Operations ran for nearly 20 years before the management decided on an extensive modernization. In 1908 and 1909 the plant was expanded and machinery replaced, including the installation of new turbines, among them the most popular of the day, the Francis turbine. Two new grinding machines, new sorting machines, and chip drums were acquired. After these improvements, production reached 12,000 tonnes. With this increase in capacity the number of employees also rose, but only to 35 in 1920. Chips not used in pulp production were used to heat the factory.

The economic conditions in the wood-processing industry were marked by abrupt shifts. The price of wood pulp fell noticeably again in 1910, yet timber prices rose, climbing 75 percent in the years up to the World War. Ramfos kept its costs down thanks to the 1908–1909 modernization, but even with greater production capacity, earnings were not as hoped.

The higher timber prices ruined the business. In 1914 the Norwegian owner Elling Ellingsen therefore offered the plant to Modum municipality, which declined. Krødsherad municipality instead bought the factory for 450,000 kroner, a price that with the timber stock came to 690,000 kroner. The formal transfer of the mill took place in 1916.

== Ramfos kommunale Træsliperi ==
It was Krødsherad's municipal electricity committee that planned the purchase of the company, intending to use the Ramfossen for power production. The municipality was more interested in electricity than in wood pulp, but pulp production was useful as a source of income while the district was being electrified.

Krødsherad municipality got electricity production under way. Prices for labor and materials were high, but the venture went ahead in the belief that the upturn would continue, and from 1916 to 1920 Ramfos Tresliperi did well, allowing Krødsherad to transfer money from the mill to finance the power development.

The turn came abruptly. The price of wood pulp fell considerably in 1921. The mill's management had bought timber at prices based on the market value of wood pulp before the crash, and the timber contracts could not be cancelled. The mill fell into financial trouble that culminated in 1926 with a deficit of 240,000 kroner. The power development had saddled the municipality with considerable debt that became difficult to service, and the municipal leadership could no longer transfer money from a business where there was nothing to be had. Demands were eventually made that Krødsherad should withdraw from the whole business and sell Ramfos.

In the difficult years after the 1921 downturn, Krødsherad municipality replaced the manager and the mill master. The manager Mørch, employed since the establishment of the municipal company in 1916, was replaced by Th. Løvig of Drammen in 1923, and the mill master Olaus Hovde, who had held the position since the start in 1890, was replaced in 1927 by Alfred Torgersen. These changes in daily operation did not alter the fundamental capital problems the company faced. In 1928 Krødsherad Sparebank put a stop to continued operation.

A debt committee was set up in 1930 and demanded the sale of the mill, but the plant proved difficult to sell. Machinery and other production equipment was bought by interested parties in Mjøndalen in 1939, while the municipality could not dispose of the factory buildings until 1966.

== Bibliography ==
- Moen, Eli (1993). Modum – ei bygd med tre elver. Industrialiseringen av ei østlandsbygd 1870–1940. Modum.
- Mørch, Andreas (1976). Krødsherad, vols. 2 and 3. Drammen.
