= Ole-Jacob Hoff =

Norwegian economist (1928–2003)

- Born: 1928; Oslo, Norway
- Died: 2003 (aged 75)
- Occupations: Editor and writer of Farmand
- Organization: Mont Pelerin Society
- Parents: Trygve Hoff; Astrid Henriette Gundersen

Ole-Jacob Hoff (born 1928 in Oslo) was a Norwegian economist, academician, author, publisher, and scholar. The son of a fellow economist and author, Trygve Hoff, Ole-Jacob Hoff also functioned as editor of the Norwegian-language economic periodical Farmand until 1989. He graduated from Harvard University and was a social and political critic and speaker.

== Career ==
Ole Jacob Hoff took over as editor and publisher of Farmand after his father's death and stayed on this post for six years (1983–1989). Through this publication, Hoff promoted liberal solutions and perspective in society. Just like his predecessor, Hoff was also a member of Mont Pelerin Society and a frequent speaker at a number of the society's meetings. Hoff was an honoree at the Foundation for Economic Education's Honor Roll of Authors for The Freeman, 1956–1996. He was a faculty member and adjunct scholar at Ludwig von Mises Institute. He was also a previous member of the editorial board of the Review of Austrian Economics

== Views ==
Hoff was an ardent believer of libertarianism and the free market economic ideas of Leonard Read, the founder of the Foundation for Economic Education (FEE), an American-pioneered paradigm. He described his ideas as anarcho-capitalist.

== Publications ==
- The Myth of Scandinavia's ‘Model Welfare State’ (journal article)
- Little Hope for Markets in the USSR (journal article)
- Politics is Other People's Money (article)
- Tales from the Public Sector (journal article)
- Socialism at the Crossroads (journal article)
- Which Way Norway (journal article)
- Scandinavia: Quiet Revolution (journal article)
