= Per Sanderud =

Norwegian civil servant (born 1953)

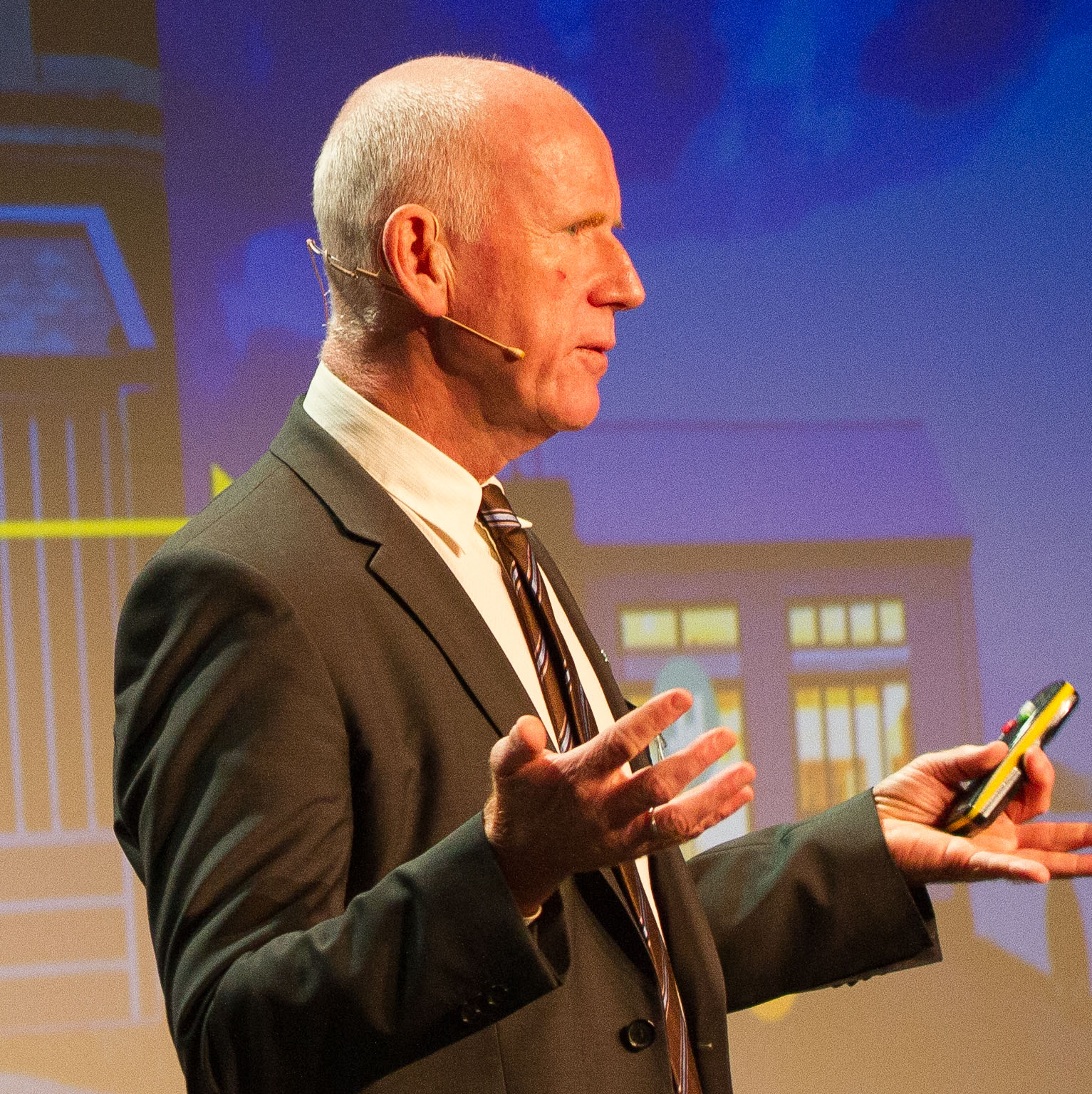

Per Sanderud (born 1 November 1953) is a Norwegian civil servant.

He was born in Oslo, and is a cand.oecon. by education. He served as deputy under-secretary of state in the Ministry of Agriculture from 1989 to 1993, and in the Ministry of Transport and Communications from 1993 to 1997. He then served as permanent under-secretary of state in the same ministry from 1997 to 2005, and in the Ministry of Trade and Industry from 2005 to 2007. In 2007 he was appointed as president of the European Free Trade Association Surveillance Authority. In 2011 he was appointed director of the Norwegian Water Resources and Energy Directorate, retiring in 2018.

Preceded by Karin M. Bruzelius	Permanent under-secretary of state in the Ministry of Transport and Communications; 1997–2005	Succeeded by Eva Hildrum
Preceded by Jan Solberg	Permanent under-secretary of state in the Ministry of Trade and Industry; 2005–2007	Succeeded by Reier Søberg
Preceded by Bjørn T. Grydeland	President of the European Free Trade Association Surveillance Authority; 2007–2011	Succeeded by Oda Sletnes
Preceded by Agnar Aas	Director of the Norwegian Water Resources and Energy Directorate; 2011–2018	Succeeded by Anne Britt Leifseth (acting)
