= Norwegian porridge feud =

Debates in Norway (1864–1866)

The Norwegian porridge feud (grautstriden) were a series of public debates that was going on in Norway between 1864 and 1866, concerned with the optimal way of cooking porridge. The participants were Peter Christen Asbjørnsen and Eilert Sundt. The core of the debate was about whether or not it was redundant to add flour to porridge after cooking it.

The background for the debate was that Asbjørnsen published a cookbook in 1864 called Fornuftigt Madstel. En tidsmæssig Koge- og Husholdningsbog (approximately translated as, "Sensible Fare. A Modern Cooking and Housekeeping Book"), under the pseudonym Clemens Bonifacius, where he argued that the addition of flour to the porridge was wasteful. Asbjørnsen believed that the human body could simply not extract any nutritional value from the flour; he believed that it was uncooked and that uncooked flour was indigestible. On the other side, Sundt argued that one should trust the competence of the Norwegian porridge makers gathered through generations.

Asbjørnsen's belief that the flour remained uncooked was incorrect, as the flour cooks when it is stirred into the hot, watery dish.

Later sources say that adding flour to porridge is sometimes necessary to make it thicken properly, especially if the porridge is cooked with grains of doubtful quality, such as most Norwegian cooks would have encountered after a bad harvest. In this analysis, flour was neither added because women followed the traditions of previous generations, nor omitted in the name of science and domestic economy, but added because it produced the desired texture.
