= Agnar Aas =

Norwegian civil servant (born 1951)

Agnar Aas (born 1951) is a Norwegian civil servant.

== Early life ==
Aas was born in Gulen Municipality in Western Norway as a son of school director Sverre Aas, and grew up in Hyllestad Municipality and Leikanger Municipality. He graduated from the Norwegian College of Agriculture in 1976.

== Career ==
He worked with estate exchange in Finnmark from 1976 to 1979, and then with forestry administration in Troms from 1979 to 1990. In 1990, he was appointed as the new director of the Directorate of State Forests. In 1993, the directorate was renamed Statskog. In 1998, he left the position and worked as a consultant, until he was appointed as director of the Norwegian Water Resources and Energy Directorate in 1999. In late 2010, it was announced that he would retire in 2011.

He was a board member of Senter for Bygdeturisme from 1991 to 1995 (Center for rural tourism, a government organization which closed in 2000), NAVO from 1993 to 1996, Moelven Industrier from 1997 to 1999, the Norwegian Forest Research Institute from 1999 (this became defunct in 2006) and the Institute for Energy Technology from 2001.

== Personal life ==
As of 2008, he was married to Inger Marie (born c. 1952) and has three adult children, as well as five grandchildren.

Civic offices
Preceded by Ola Bjørnstad	Director of the Norwegian Directorate of State Forests/Statskog; 1990–1998	Succeeded by Asbjørn Mathisen
Preceded by Erling Diesen	Director of the Norwegian Water Resources and Energy Directorate; 1999–2011	Succeeded by Per Sanderud
