= Byavisa Sandefjord =

Free newspaper in Sandefjord, Norway

- Type: Weekly newspaper (2010-2016); biweekly (2016-2018)
- Founder: Sverre Aamodt
- Editor: Marianne Henriksen
- Founded: 4 May 2010
- Ceased publication: 5 December 2018
- Language: Norwegian Bokmål
- City: Sandefjord
- Country: Norway
- Circulation: 21,600 (as of 2016)
- Readership: 53,000 (2013); 26,000 (2014)
- Website: byavisa.sandefjord.no (defunct)

Byavisa Sandefjord (Norwegian for 'Sandefjord City Paper'), known as Vestfold Blad (Norwegian for 'Vestfold Paper') until 2014, was a local free newspaper in Sandefjord, Norway. Owned by the media conglomerate Content Media, the paper was published weekly and later biweekly, and competed with Sandefjords Blad. Founded in 2010, Byavisa Sandefjord ran on deficits for most of its existence, before 2018, when the paper was shut down.

== History ==
=== As Vestfold Blad ===
The weekly newspaper Vestfold Blad was created by Sverre Aamodt in May 2010—with assistance from Kjell Arne Bratli and Sandefjords Blad journalist Marianne Henriksen—to service Vestfold county, with its first issue being published on 4 May 2010. In December 2010, they bought out the boating specialist paper Båtavisa, with co-founder Joyce Christine Øksenholt continuing as editor under the new management.

In January 2012, Tønsbergs Blad journalist Lars Døvle Larssen uncovered the paper's connections to the evangelical Brunstad Christian Church. Kåre Johan Smith, missionary and leader of the church, was connected to the company with the largest shares in the paper, Tritoria Investments, which held 80%. The company was largely owned by two people, Øivind and Jan Lindstad, the second of which was a trustee of the church in Østfold, with minor ownership by Smith himself. When questioned about the ownership, Aamodt answered that he didn't feel it relevant to enquire about the investors' religious background, noting that he also did not do so for any of his employees. Editor Henriksen commented that the paper adhered to principles of editorial independence, regardless of ownership. She further added that they were not trying to hide their connection, and that the articles in Tønsbergs Blad were written to mislead readers: "a lie repeated often enough becomes truth".

=== New ownership ===
In its three years of publication, Vestfold Blad suffered heavy economic losses, running a deficit of around 12 million kr. Consequently they were acquired in March 2014 by media conglomerate Content Media (Note: At the time of acquisition, they were known as Lundquist Media, before changing their name in 2015.) who were already owners of several city papers in Western Norway. Now publishing only in Sandefjord, Tjølling, and Stokke, the paper competed directly with Sandefjords Blad, whose editor in chief Jan Roaldset stated their intention to go on the offensive.

Following further deficits after its acquisition, the city papers for Sandefjord and Tønsberg, both owned by the same company, were moved to the same premises in August 2016, in addition to both changing from weekly to biweekly publication three months later in November. When asked if the reduction was temporary, general manager Bjørn Larsen commented that it would likely continue through 2017. Less than half a year later, Byavisa Tønsberg moved back to their offices in Torvgaten in Tønsberg in January 2017, after it was bought back by the original owners, Vibeke and Christer Lundquist. Byavisa Sandefjord remained in the hands of Content Media.

=== Cessation ===
On 5 December 2018, Byavisa Sandefjord published its final issue. Citing lack of funding from advertisers, the closing of the publication was announced by staff on Facebook on 12 December. This followed the cessation of the local papers in Sarpsborg and Fredrikstad, leaving Content Media with just two left, Byavisa Moss and Byavisa Drammen. These later went bankrupt in January 2019 and October 2020, respectively.
