= Sigmund Larsen =

Norwegian engineer, civil servant and politician

Sigmud Larsen (1921 – 23 January 2007) was a Norwegian engineer, civil servant and politician for the Labour Party.

He was born in Haugesund, attended lower secondary school in Dale i Sunnfjord and then Bergen Technical School. He graduated as a civil engineer from the Norwegian Institute of Technology in 1950. He was the municipal engineer in Askøy Municipality from 1950 to 1953, engineer for Bergen Municipality from 1953 to 1958 and 1960 to 1964, headmaster at Bergen Technical School from 1958 to 1960 and county engineer in the County Governor's Office of Hordaland from 1964 to 1974. From September 1974 to August 1975 he was a part of Bratteli's Second Cabinet as a State Secretary in the Ministry of Church and Education. From 1975 to 1987 he was the director-general of the Norwegian Water Resources and Electricity Agency. He was decorated as a Commander of the Order of St. Olav.

He was married, had five children and ultimately settled in Askøy. He died in January 2007.

Civic offices
Preceded by Vidkun Hveding	Director-general of the Norwegian Water Resources and Electricity Agency; 1975–1987	Succeeded by Erling Diesen
