= Maurits Hansen =

Norwegian writer (1794–1842)

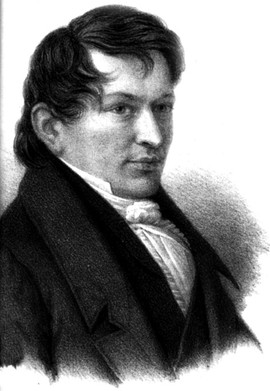
Maurits Hansen.

Maurits Christopher Hansen (5 July 1794 – 16 March 1842) was a Norwegian writer.

He was born in Modum as a son of Carl Hansen (1757–1826) and Abigael Wulfsberg (1758–1823). In October 1816 he married teacher Helvig Leschly (1789–1874). He was a father-in-law of Eilert Sundt, and thus grandfather of Einar Sundt.

He is recognized for his contribution to a diversity of genres and the introduction of the novel in Norway. He was a major contributor to the Norwegian Romantic Movement. He also wrote one of the world's first crime novels with "Mordet på Maskinbygger Roolfsen" ("The Murder of Engine Maker Roolfsen") in 1839, two years before Edgar Allan Poe's short story "The Murders in the Rue Morgue" in 1841.

After attending Oslo Cathedral School from 1809 and completing his examen artium in 1814, he worked as a teacher in Trondheim from 1820 and in Kongsberg from 1826. He was a fellow of the Royal Norwegian Society of Sciences and Letters in Trondheim, but was not appointed when he applied for a position as lecturer of philosophy at the Royal Frederick University around 1839.
