= Eva Hildrum =

Norwegian civil servant (born 1948)

Eva Hildrum (born 18 April 1948) is a Norwegian civil servant.

She took the cand.polit. degree in 1986, worked in Statskonsult from 1986 to 1990 before being hired in the Norwegian Ministry of Government Administration and Labour. Here she was promoted to head of department in 1991, and from 1995 to 1997 she was deputy under-secretary of state in the Ministry of Children and Family Affairs. In 1997 she became deputy under-secretary of state in the Ministry of Transport and Communications, and in December 2005 she was promoted to permanent under-secretary of state (Norwegian: departementsråd), the highest civil position in the ministry, effective from 2006. She retired in 2015.

Civic offices
Preceded by Per Sanderud	Permanent under-secretary of state in the Ministry of Transport and Communications; 2006–2015	Succeeded by Villa Kulild
