= Christian Hansen Tandberg =

Norwegian politician

Christian Hansen Tandberg (28 October 1872 – 1951) was a Norwegian farmer and politician for the Agrarian Party.

He was born at Nykirke in Modum as a son of farmer Hans Christiansen Tandberg (1841–1905) and his wife Ingeborg, née Kittilsdatter (1834–1919). He took petty officer training in the field artillery from 1893 to 1896, and worked as a policeman in Drammen until 1901, when he took over the family farm. He also continued on the military books, reaching the rank of lieutenant in 1930. He was a member of Modum municipal council from 1910 to 1916, 1919 to 1928 and 1931 to 1934, and served as deputy mayor from 1922 to 1925. He was also a member of the school board from 1906 to 1912. He was elected to the Parliament of Norway in 1933, representing the constituency of Buskerud. He served one term.
