= Arne Hoffstad =

Norwegian politician (1900–1980)

Arne Hoffstad (21 September 1900 – 26 September 1980) was a Norwegian newspaper editor and Conservative Party politician. Born in Sandefjord, the son of a botanist, he became the editor of the local Sandefjords Blad newspaper.

== Early life ==
He was born in Sandefjord, the son of Olaf Alfred Hoffstad (1865–1943) and his second wife Birgitte Lucie Richter (born 1868). He was a half-brother of Einar Hoffstad. He had commerce school by education, and was hired as a sub-editor in Sandefjords Blad in 1925. From 2 January 1931 he was the editor-in-chief of Sandefjords Blad. He doubled as manager, but withdrew as such in 1964. In 1971 he celebrated his 40th anniversary as editor-in-chief.

Hoffstad was also an active politician, and chaired the Norwegian Young Conservatives from 1937 to 1940. He was a national board member of the Conservative Party, chaired Sandefjord Conservative Party and was a member of Sandefjord city council.

Hoffstad founded Høyres Bladeierforening in 1935, and was chairman here for 20 years. He was a board member of the Norsk Bladeierforening from 1937 and chairman from 1951 to 1953. He also chaired the Norske Avisers Landsforbund from 1952 to 1953, was a board member of the Norwegian News Agency and board member and deputy chairman of Avisenes Informasjonskontor from 1954 to 1970.
