= Villa Kulild =

Norwegian civil servant (born 1964)

Villa Kulild (born 31 March 1964) is a Norwegian civil servant.

Kulild worked for around 20 years in the Ministry of Petroleum and Energy, eventually becoming acting permanent under-secretary of state. She resigned her position in the ministry on 7 December 2008 after Dagens Næringsliv reported that she had started up her own investment firm which included investments in oil companies.

In 2009 she became deputy director of the Norwegian Agency for Development Cooperation, and was named as the new director in November 2010.

Civic offices
Preceded by Poul Engberg-Pedersen	Director of the Norwegian Agency for Development Cooperation; 2010–2015	Succeeded by Jon Lomøy
Preceded by Eva Hildrum	Permanent under-secretary of state in the Ministry of Transport and Communications; 2015–present	Succeeded by Incumbent
