= Ola Bjørnstad =

Norwegian forester and civil servant

Ola Bjørnstad is a Norwegian forester and civil servant.

He graduated in forestry from the Norwegian College of Agriculture in 1966. He has spent his career working with forestry and transport. He has worked as a researcher for the Institute of Transport Economics, transport consulent in Landbrukets Sentralforbund, secretary for the Standing Committee on Transport and Communications, transport director in Norske Skog and sub-director in the Norwegian Ministry of Transport and Communications. From 1982 to 1990 he was the director of the Directorate of State Forests, and from 1993 to 2006 he was the director of the Opplysningsrådet for Veitrafikken.

Civic offices
Preceded by	Director of the Norwegian Directorate of State Forests; 1982–1990	Succeeded by Agnar Aas
