= Charles E. Hanson =

American politician

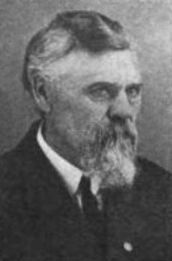

Member of the Wisconsin State Assembly
- In office 1917, 1919, 1921, 1923, 1929

Personal details
- Born: February 27, 1855 Modum, Norway
- Died: December 1, 1932 (aged 77) Pierce County, Wisconsin, US
- Party: Republican
- Spouse: Belle Anderson
- Children: 6

Charles Edward Hanson (1855–1932) was a member of the Wisconsin State Assembly.

== Biography ==
Hanson was born on February 27, 1855, in Modum, Norway. In 1871, he settled in Pierce County, Wisconsin, where he eventually became a farm owner. On April 27, 1879, Hanson married Belle Anderson. They would have six children. Hanson was a member of the Methodist Episcopal Church. He died at his home near River Falls, Wisconsin on December 1, 1932.

== Political career ==
Hanson was elected to the Assembly in 1916, 1918, 1920, 1922 and 1928. During the 1925 session, Hanson was sergeant-at-arms of the Assembly. Other positions he held include assessor of River Falls and school board member. He was a Republican.
