= Jørgen Martinius Jensen =

Norwegian historian and sports official

Jørgen Martinius Jensen (1 January 1878 – 31 March 1970) was a Norwegian military officer and sports official. He was born in Kristiania and competed at the 1912 Summer Olympics in Stockholm, where he placed 26th in individual jumping.

He headed the Norges Landsforbund for Idrett from 1930 to 1932 and the Norwegian Equestrian Federation from 1936 to 1940. By profession, he was a military officer with the rank of colonel. He headed Opland dragonregiment, a dragoon regiment, from 1934 to 1943, and was as such involved in battles of the Norwegian Campaign, among others at Åsmarka and Tretten. After the war, from 1946 to 1956, he worked in the Norwegian Armed Forces department of war history.

Sporting positions
Preceded by Leif S. Rode	Chairman of the Norges Landsforbund for Idrett; 1930–1932	Succeeded by Daniel Eie
