= Erling Diesen =

Norwegian engineer and civil servant (1932–2026)

Erling Diesen (6 July 1932 – 3 July 2026) was a Norwegian engineer and civil servant.

== Life and career ==
Diesen was born in Geithus on 6 July 1932. He finished his secondary education in Hønefoss in 1951 and graduated as a civil engineer from the Norwegian Institute of Technology in 1956. He worked at the Institute of Technology as engineer and research assistant until 1960, and was a secretary in the Norwegian Electrotechnical Committee from 1960 to 1961. He was hired in the Norwegian Water Resources and Electricity Agency in 1961, and was a chief engineer in the power plant department until 1977 and in the electricity department from 1977 to 1978. He was then a subdirector in the Norwegian Ministry of Petroleum and Energy from 1978 to 1980 and then as subdirector in the Water Resources and Electricity Agency from 1980 to 1983. He was the chief executive officer of Buskerud Energiverk from 1983.

In 1987 he became director-general of the Norwegian Water Resources and Energy Agency, and after a reorganization he served as director from 1991 to 1999. He presided over the Norwegian committee of the World Energy Council and chaired Norsk energiforening in the Norwegian Polytechnic Society. He was a board member of the Institute for Energy Technology and member of the NTNF energy committee.

He resided in Asker. Diesen died on 3 July 2026, at the age of 93.

Civic offices
Preceded by Sigmund Larsen	Director of the Norwegian Water Resources and Energy Agency; 1987–1999	Succeeded by Agnar Aas
