= Andreas Edvard Disen =

Norwegian painter

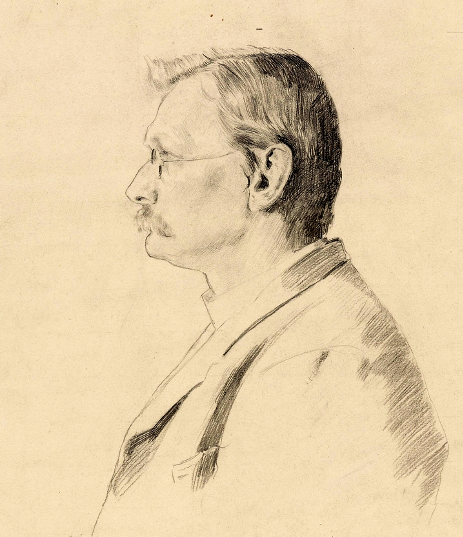
Andreas Edvard Disen; sketch by Christian Krohg (c.1892)

Andreas Edvard Disen (4 August 1845, Modum - 18 February 1923, Modum) was a Norwegian painter; primarily known for mountain landscapes from Jotunheimen and Hardangervidda.

== Biography ==
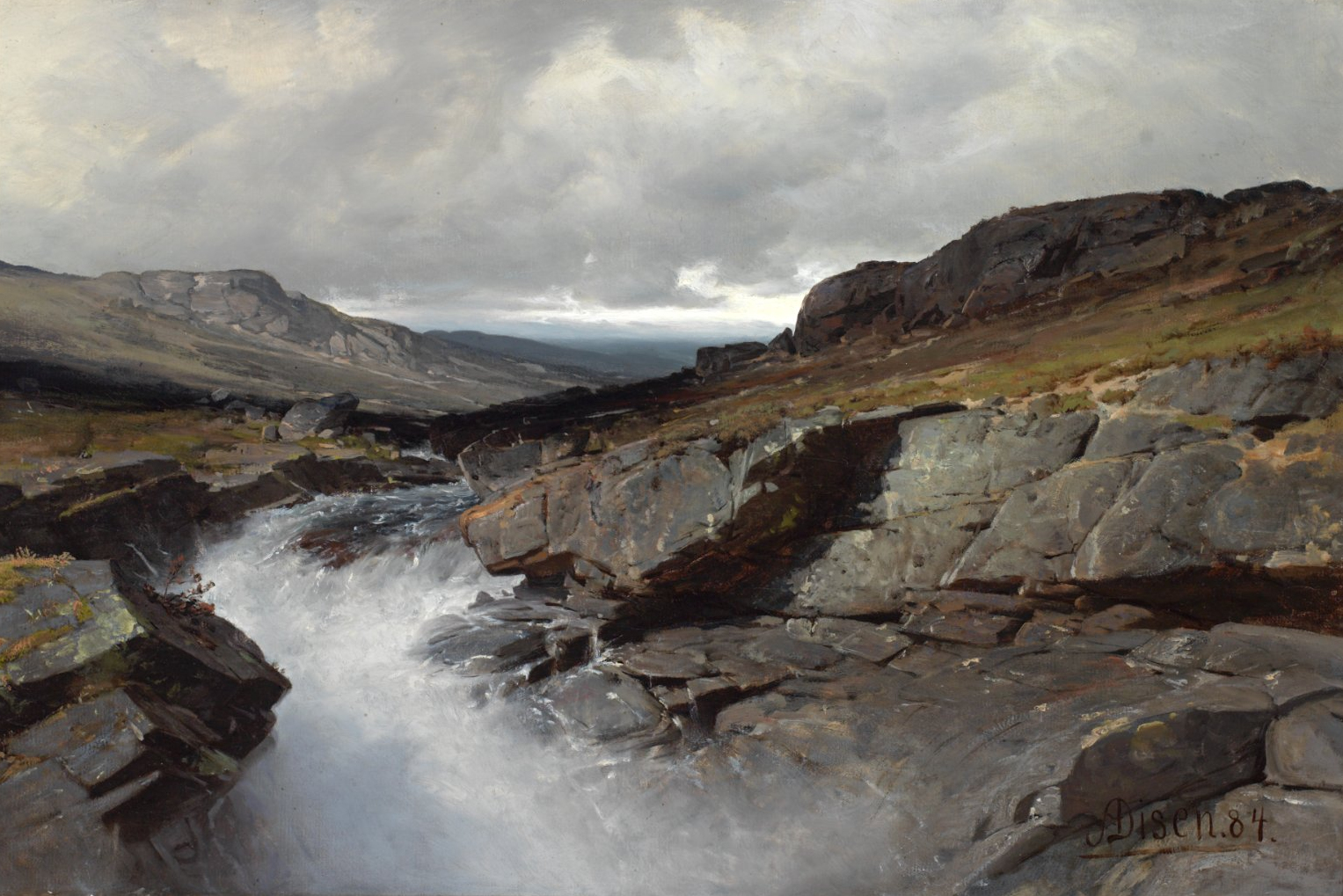
Fjellparti (1884)

He received his artistic education from Johan Fredrik Eckersberg, with whom he worked from 1863 to 1869. At the same time, he studied with the sculptor, Julius Middelthun, at the Royal Drawing School.

One day, while working alone at Eckersberg's art school, he received a surprise visit from King Charles IV, who was quite knowledgeable about art. He gave the King a tour, which ended with the purchase of a painting he had just completed and the promise of a 100 Daler annual scholarship.

He used this money to attend the Academy of Fine Arts, Karlsruhe, where he studied under Hans Fredrik Gude from 1871 to 1876; serving as his assistant during the last three years. After that, he returned to Norway and remained there until his death, although he often spent his summers working in Switzerland.

At one point, he became involved in a controversy surrounding the influential "Christiania Kunstforening", an art society that had a great deal of power in determining what sort of paintings were bought and what was paid for them. The primary complaint, voiced by Christian Krohg, Erik Werenskiold and Frits Thaulow, is that the society was led by lawyers, officers and civil servants rather than artists. They also felt that Disen was being paid too much for what, in their opinion, were inferior paintings, while better artists were receiving too little or being rejected altogether. He was held up as a prime example of their complaint when they called for a boycott of the society.

The boycott lasted from 1881 to 1882 and ended with the establishment of a new organization; the Autumn Exhibition (Høstutstillingen). In 1889 Andreas Edvard Disen left Kristiania and returned to Vikersund in Modum. He married a cousin shortly thereafter. Despite his prior humiliation, Disen accepted an invitation to participate in the autumn exhibition and did so seven times from 1882 to 1904.

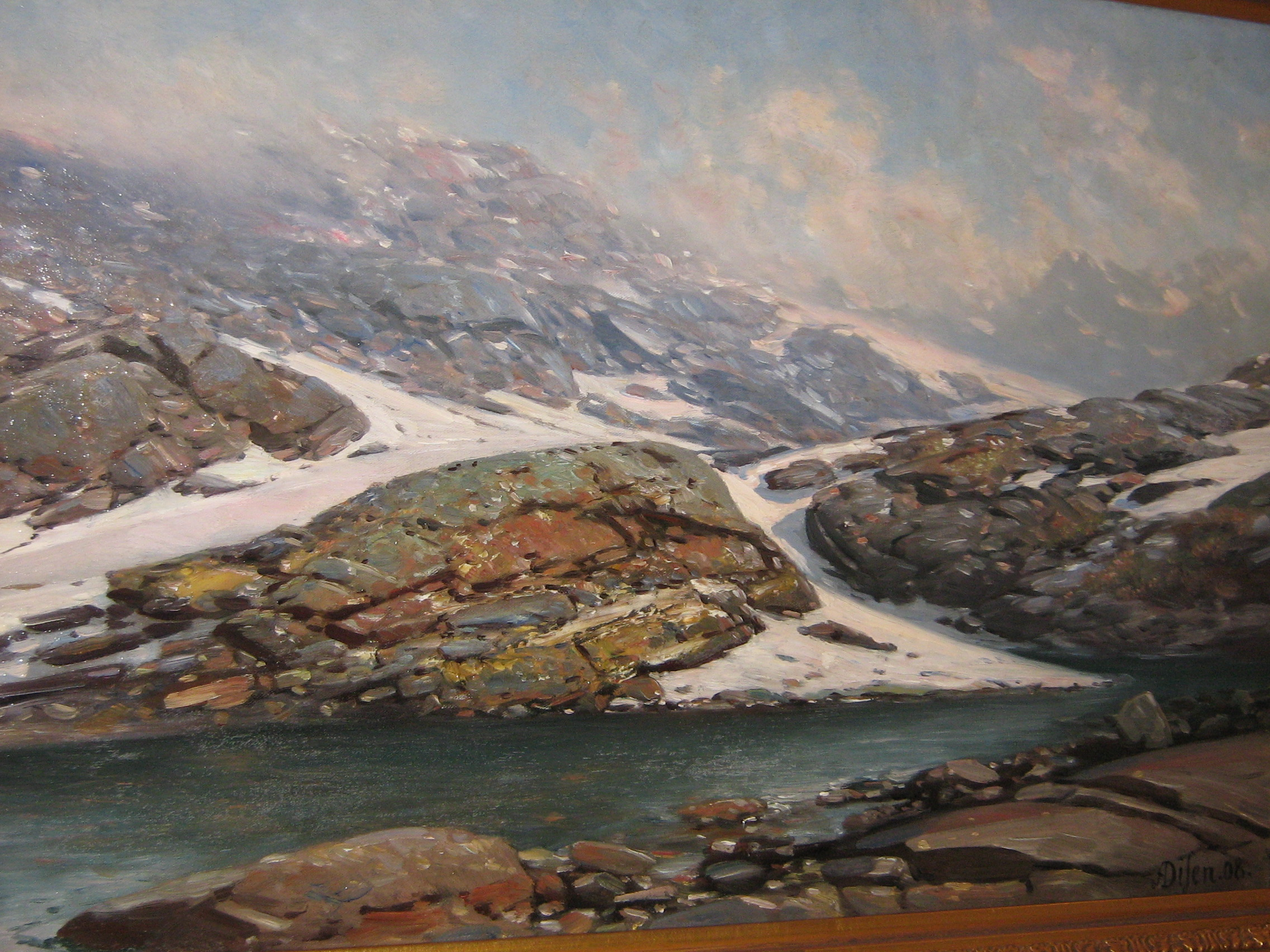
Jotunheimen, Melkedalen (1908)

Disen is represented in the National Gallery in Oslo, Trondheim Art Museum and the Drammen Museum.
