= Modum =

Modum Municipality Modum kommune
- Municipality
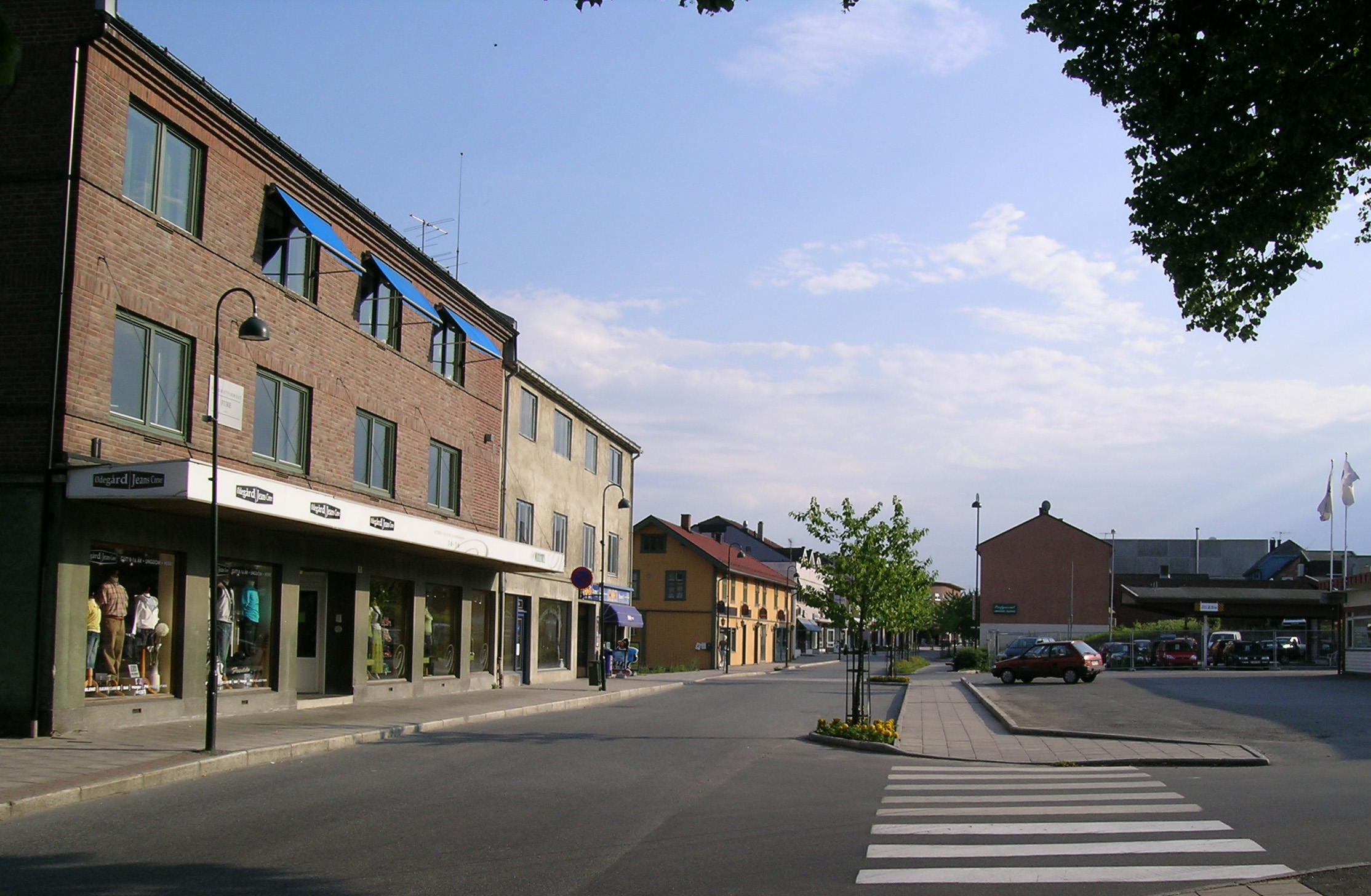

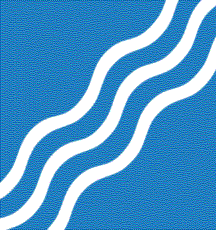
- Flag Coat of arms

- Buskerud within Norway

- Modum within Buskerud
- Coordinates: 59°57′27″N 9°58′58″E
- Country: Norway
- County: Buskerud
- District: Ringerike
- Administrative centre: Vikersund

Government
  - Mayor (2019): Sunni Grøndahl Aamodt (Sp)

Area
  - Total: 515 km^{2} (199 sq mi)
  - Land: 463 km^{2} (179 sq mi)
  - Rank: #204 in Norway

Population (2004)
  - Total: 12,594
  - Rank: #87 in Norway
  - Density: 27/km^{2} (70/sq mi)
  - Change (10 years): ▲ +3.2%
- Demonym: Moing/Moding

Official language
  - Norwegian form: Bokmål
- Time zone: UTC+01:00 (CET)
  - Summer (DST): UTC+02:00 (CEST)
- ISO 3166 code: NO-3316
- Website: Official website

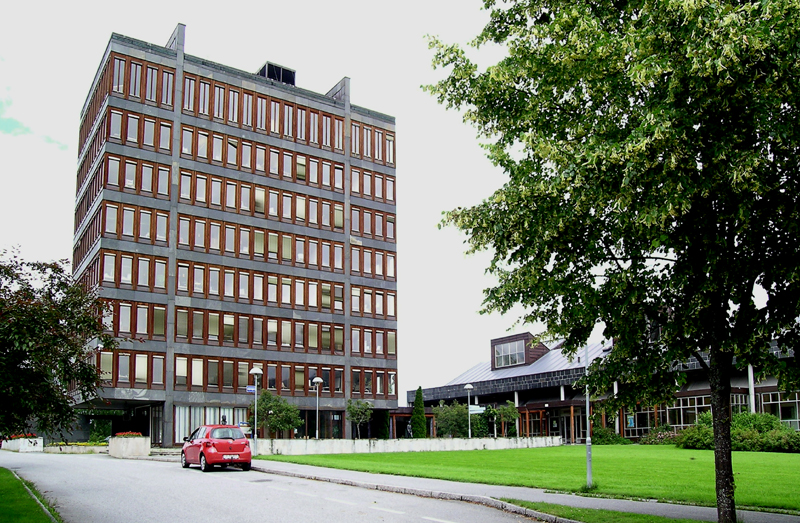
Modum City Hall at Vikersund

Modum is a municipality in Buskerud county, Norway. The administrative centre of the municipality is the town of Vikersund. The municipality of Modum was established on 1 January 1838 (see formannskapsdistrikt).

The area has a long tradition of skiing with several famous skiers. Modum is home to one of the largest ski jumping hills in the world, Vikersundbakken which is situated in Heggen, outside Geithus. The hill record, established in 2017 is a jump of 253.5 metres (832 ft).

== General information ==
=== Name ===
The municipality (originally the parish) is named after the old Modum farm (Old Norse: Móðheimr), since the first church was built here. The first element is móða which means "river" (here the Drammenselva river) and the last element is heimr which means "home", "homestead", or "farm". The name of the farm was later changed to Buskerud.

=== Coat-of-arms ===
The coat-of-arms is from modern times. They were granted on 15 March 1985. The arms show three wavy silver lines “party per bend sinister” on a blue background. They represent the three main rivers in the municipality: Drammenselva, Snarumselva, and Simoa and the colour blue represents Blaafarveværket.

Number of minorities (1st and 2nd generation) in Modum by country of origin in 2017
Ancestry	Number
Poland	316
Kosovo	98
Lithuania	87
Iraq	78
Somalia	76
Eritrea	71
Germany	71
Denmark	70
Syria	52
Sweden	48

== Geography ==
The municipality is bordered in the north by Krødsherad and Ringerike, in the east by Hole and Lier, in the south by Øvre Eiker, and in the west by Sigdal.

== Communities ==
The municipality has three main villages: Åmot, Geithus, and Vikersund.

Åmot is the starting point of Kunstnerdalen, which was frequently visited by of several Norwegian 19th and 19th century painters: Christian Krohg, Adolph Tidemand and Hans Gude. It also was home to Theodor Kittelsen and Christian Skredsvig. Edvard Munch also painted in Modum. This is also the site of Blaafarveværket which now includes a museum and art gallery.

Geithus is the location of two hydroelectric powerplants; Geithusfoss kraftverk and Gravfoss kraftverk.

Vikersund is the municipality administrative center of Modum and the site of the Modum City Hall. It is also the site of Vikersundbakken.

== Notable residents ==
=== Public service & business ===
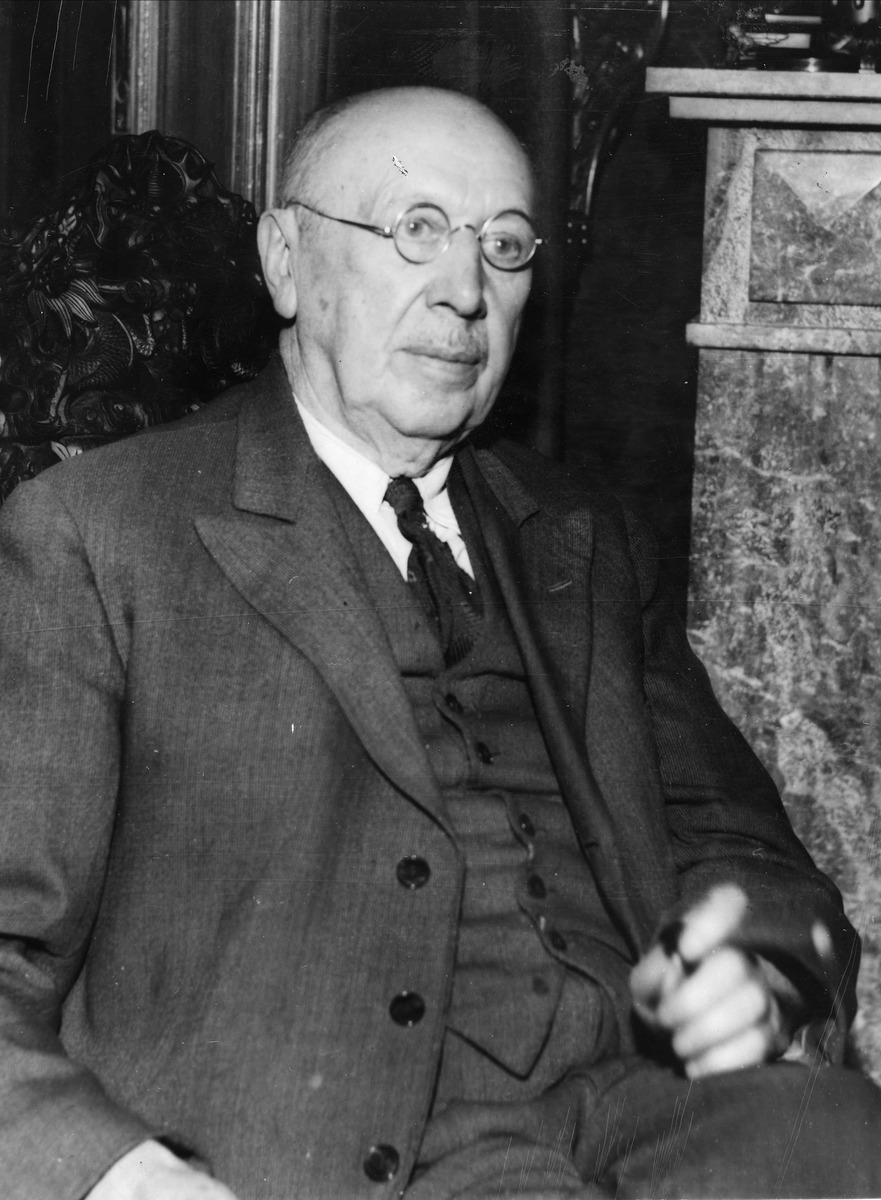
Christopher Hornsrud, ca.1930

- Hans Gulbranson (1787 in Modum – 1868) pioneer developer of the textile industry
- Gudbrand Gregersen de Saág (1824 in Modum – 1910) Norwegian-Hungarian bridge engineer
- Anders Sveaas (1840 in Modum – 1917) founded the Kistefos Wood Pulp Mill
- Albert Collett (1842 at Buskerud Manor – 1896) timber merchant, sawmill owner, founded Firma Albert Collett
- Nils P. Haugen (1849 in Modum – 1931), member of the United States House of Representatives from Wisconsin
- Charles E. Hanson (1855 in Modum – 1932), member of the Wisconsin State Assembly
- Christopher Hornsrud (1859 in Skotselv, Øvre Eiker – 1960), Norwegian Prime Minister in 1928
- Christian Hansen Tandberg (1872 at Nykirke – 1951) farmer, deputy mayor of Modum 1920's
- Hjalmar Steenstrup (1890 in Modum – 1945) insurance agent and Milorg pioneer
- Erling Diesen (born 1932 in Geithus) a Norwegian engineer and civil servant

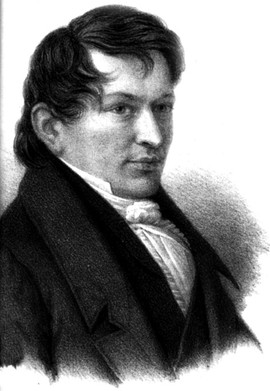
Maurits Hansen

=== The Arts ===
- Maurits Hansen (1774 in Modum – 1843), author, contributor to the Romantic Movement
- Thorvald Lammers (1841 in Modum – 1922) baritone singer, choral conductor & composer
- Andreas Edvard Disen (1845 in Modum – 1923) a mountain landscape painter
- Hans Andersen Foss (1851 in Modum – 1929) Norwegian-American author, newspaper editor
- Christian Skredsvig (1854 in Modum – 1924) painter and writer, style reflected naturalism
- Arild Formoe (1912 in Modum – 2006), accordion player and orchestra conductor
- Thure Erik Lund (born 1959 in Vikersund) author and cabinet maker

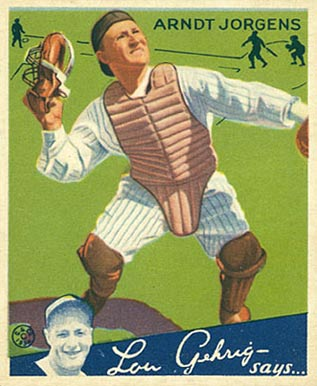
1934 baseball card of Arndt "Art" Jorgens

=== Sport ===
- Arndt Jorgens (1905 in Modum – 1980) catcher in Major League Baseball for New York Yankees
- Knut Østby (1922 in Modum – 2010) sprint canoeist, silver medallist, 1948 Summer Olympics
- Ole Gunnar Fidjestøl (born 1960), ski jumper team bronze medallist at the 1988 Winter Olympics, works in Vikersund
- Tom Gulbrandsen (born 1964) retired footballer with almost 300 club caps and 17 for Norway
- Ole Einar Bjørndalen (born 1974 in Simostranda), ski biathlete with 13 Winter Olympic Games medals

== Sister cities ==
The following cities are twinned with Modum:

- Laukaa, Western Finland, Finland
- Stevns, Region Sjælland, Denmark
- Östra Göinge, Skåne County, Sweden

== Gallery ==
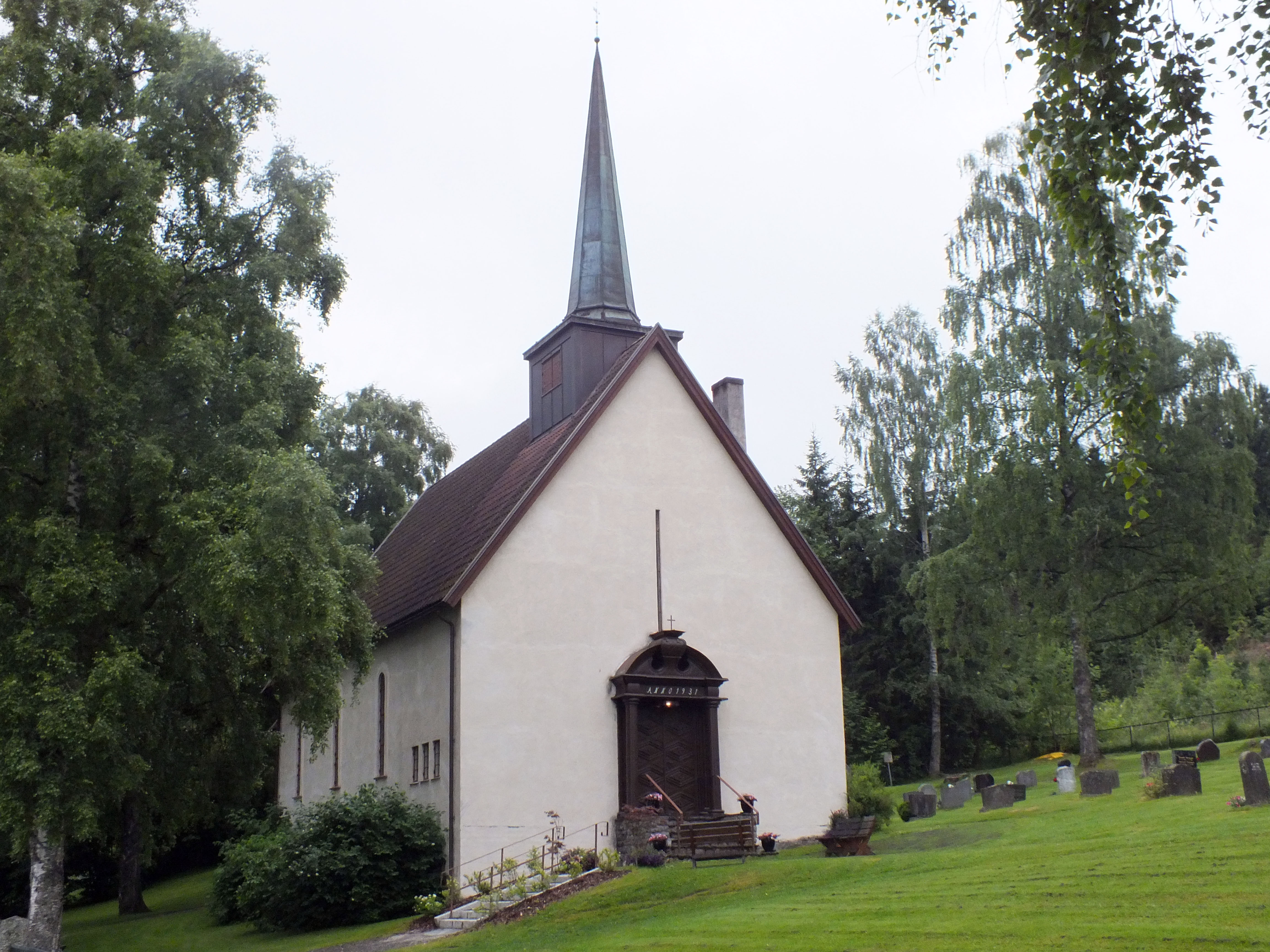
Gulsrud Church

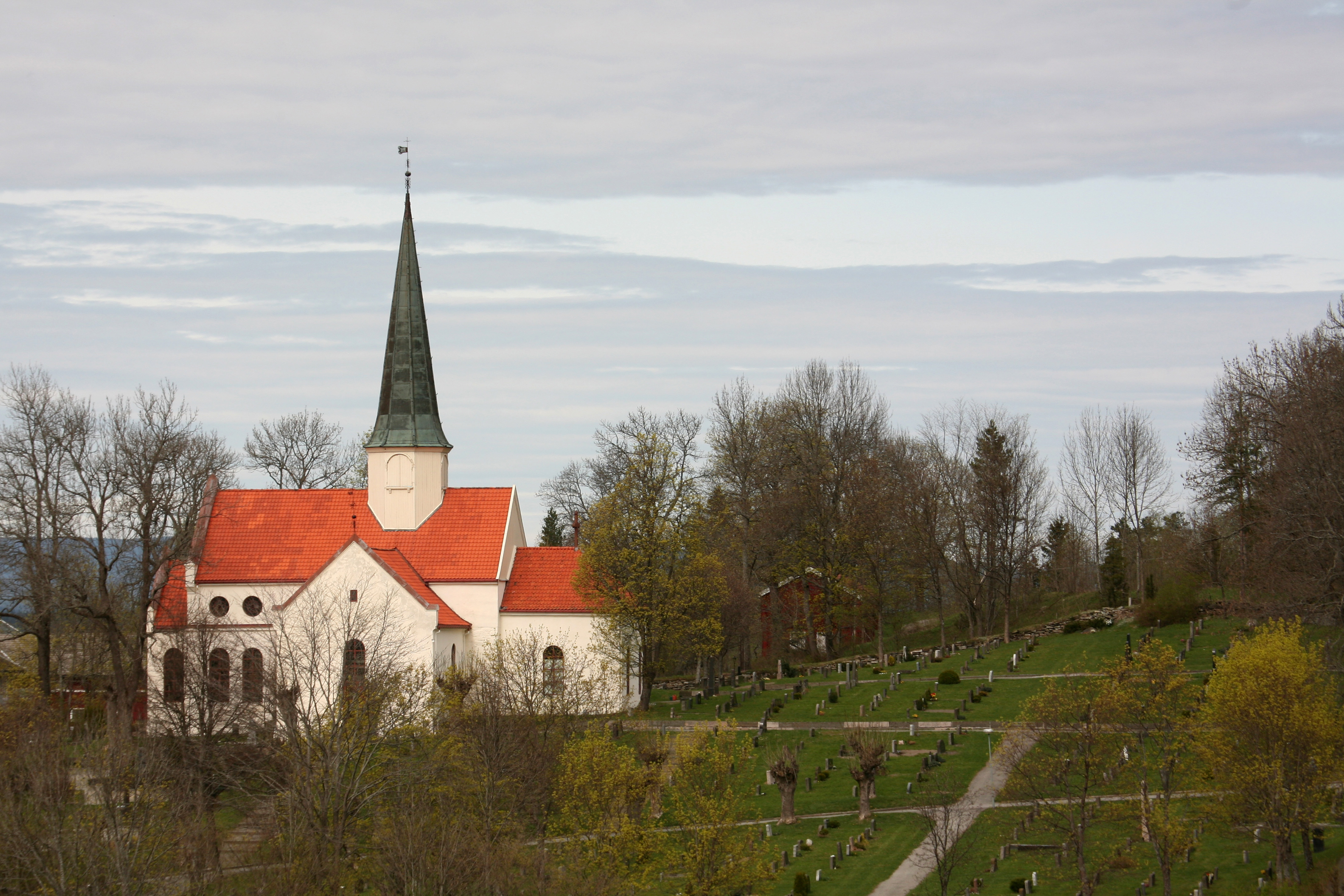
Heggen Church

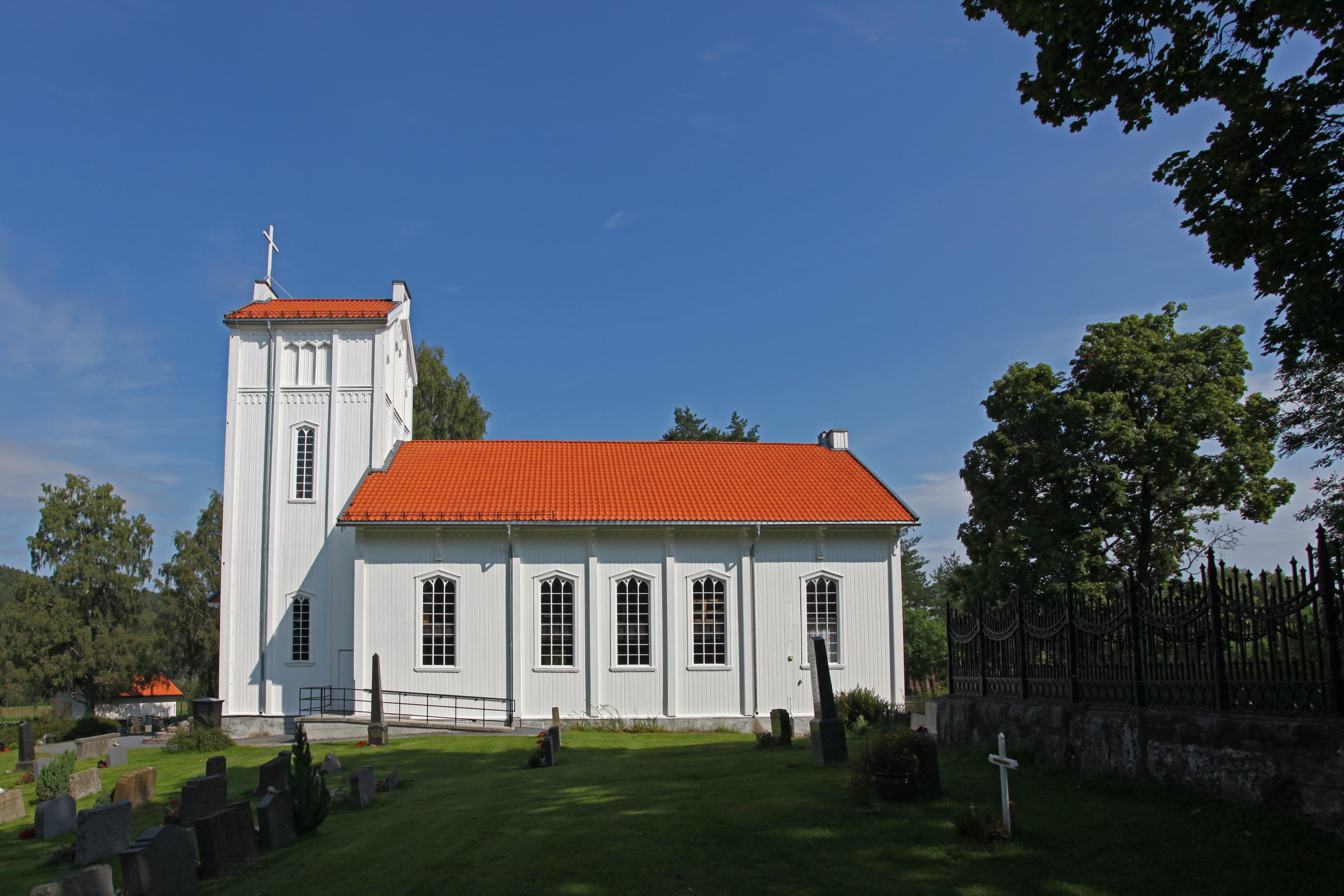
Nykirke Church

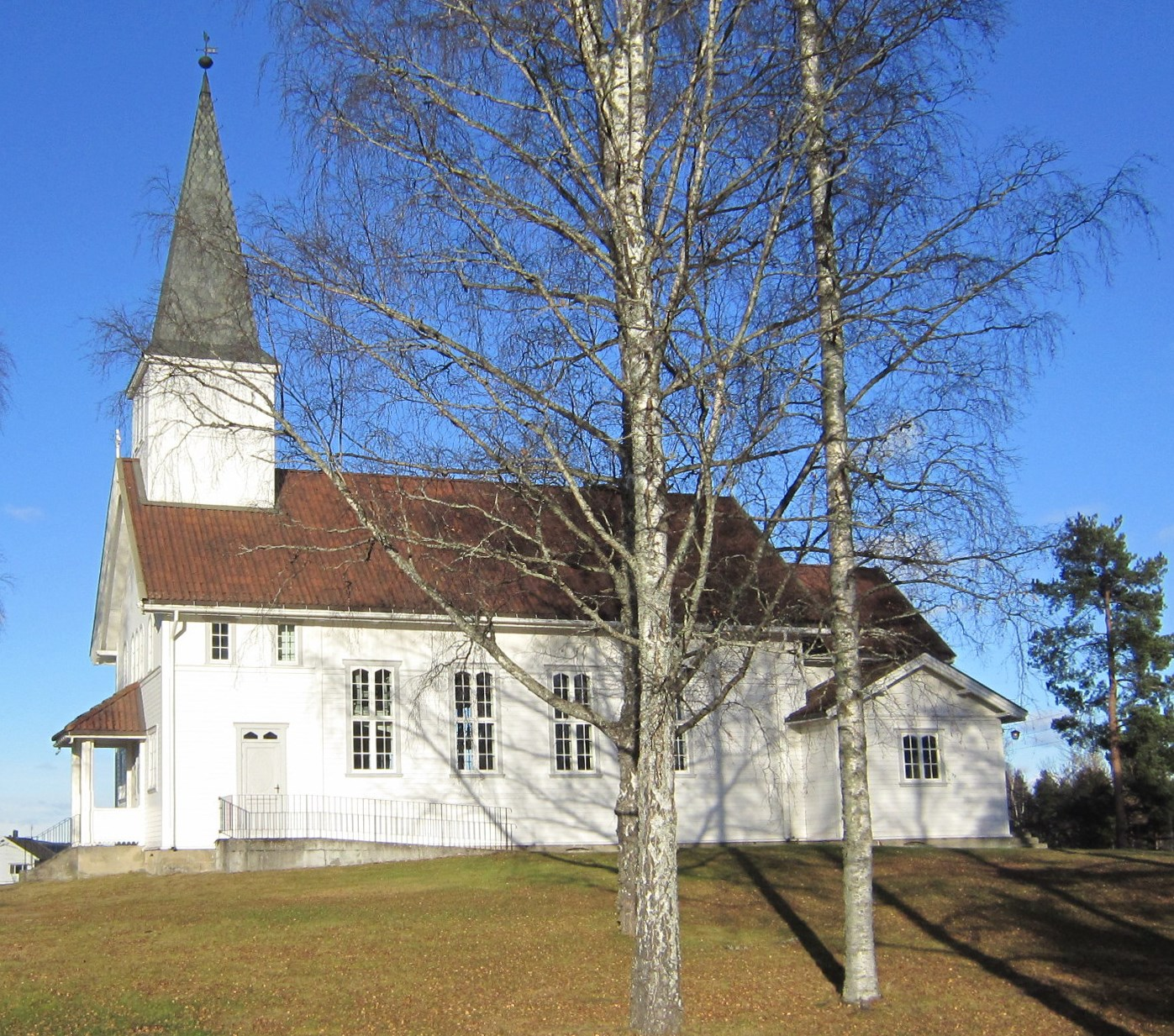
Rud Church

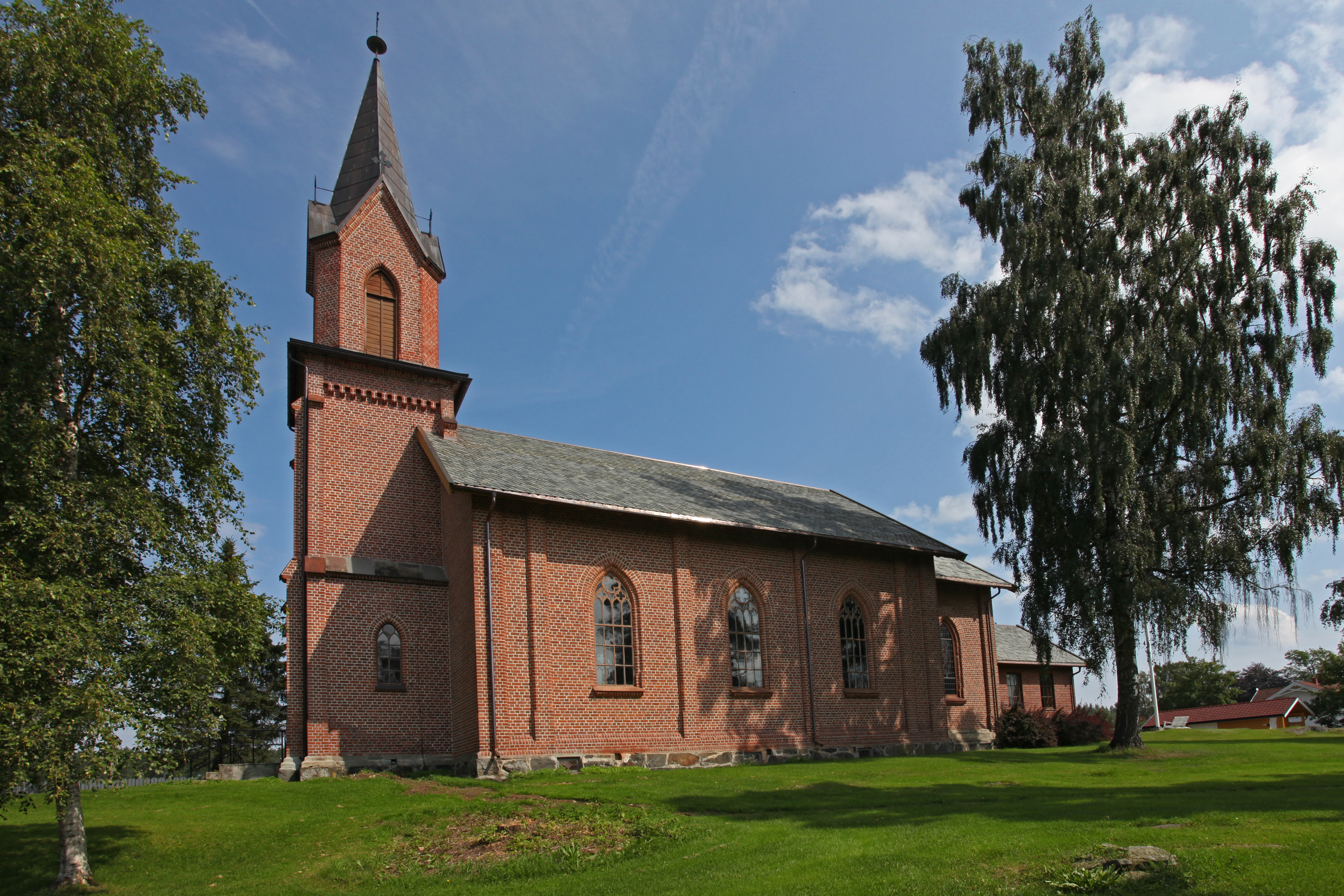
Snarum Church

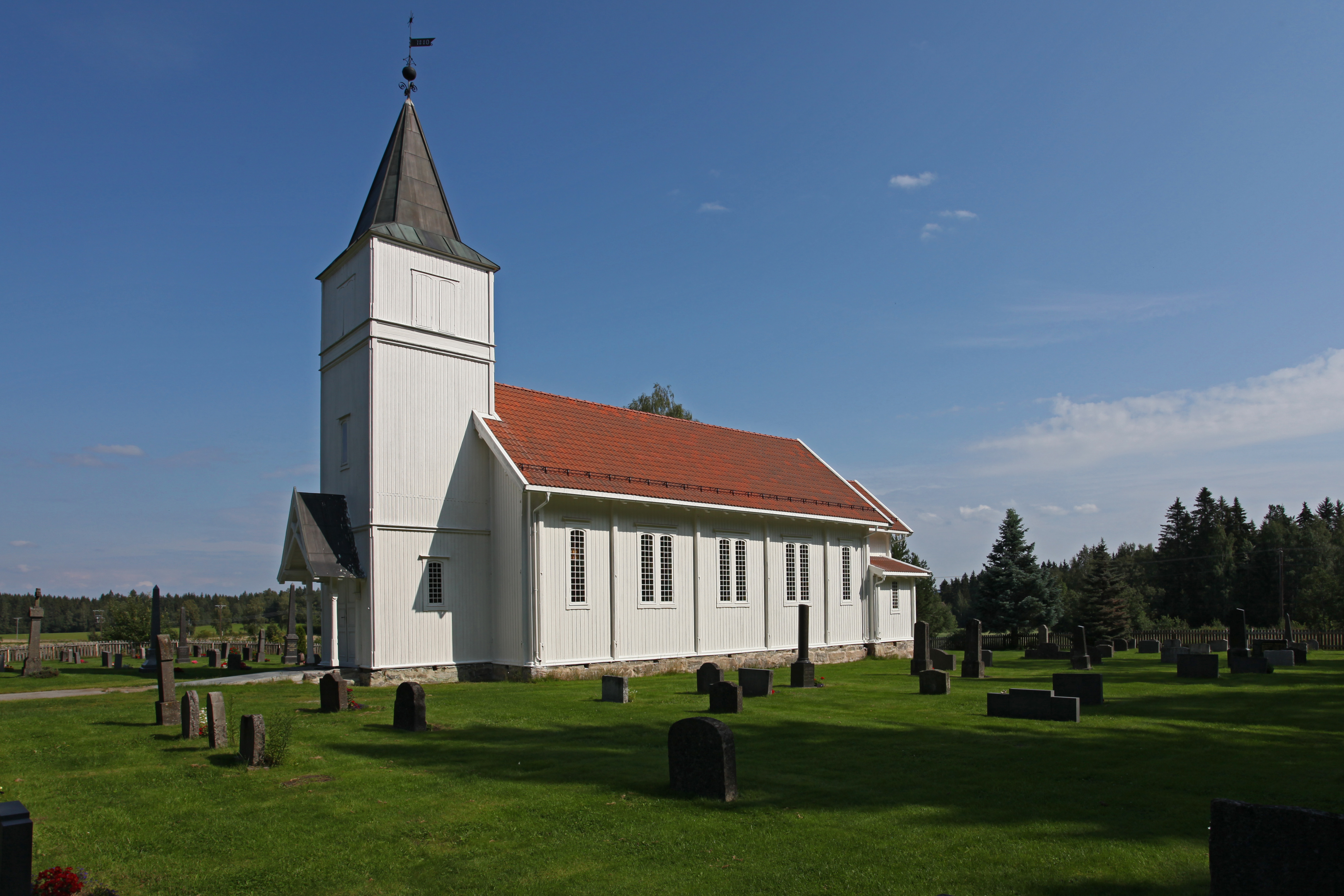
Vestre Spone Chapel
