= Trygve Hoff =

Norwegian businessman (1895–1982)

Trygve J. B. Hoff
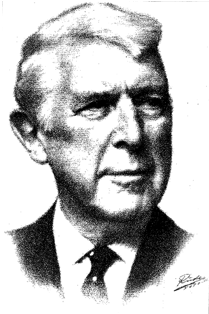
- Born: Trygve Jacob Broch Hoff; 12 November 1895; Kristiana, Norway
- Died: 4 January 1982 (aged 86); Oslo, Norway
- Occupations: Businessman, editor and writer of Farmand
- Organization: Mont Pelerin Society
- Spouses: Astrid Henriette Gundersen (m. 1920–1947) Aase Synnøve Bye (m. 1940–1982)
- Children: Per Reinhardt Hoff; Margrethe Hoff; Ole-Jacob Hoff
- Parents: Alf Eid Rosenberg Hoff; Margrethe Jacobsen

Trygve J. B. Hoff (12 November 1895 – 4 January 1982) born in Kristiana, Norway was a Norwegian businessman, writer and editor of Farmand, the Norwegian business magazine.

== Background ==
Hoff was born in Oslo as a son of lawyer Alf Eid Rosenberg Hoff and Margrethe Jacobsen. Throughout his life Hoff remained attached to the Hoff family estate at Tjøme Municipality.

In 1916, Hoff graduated from the Royal Frederick University with a degree in economics. After his graduation, he travelled to France; then later to the United States, where he studied banking and finance and worked on Wall Street.

He was first married to Astrid Henriette Gundersen in August 1920 until her death in 1947. They had three children: Per Reinhardt Hoff (born 1922), Margrethe Hoff (born 1924), and Ole-Jacob Hoff (born 1928). Later on, he married Aase Synnøve Bye on 18 September 1948.

== Career ==
Though he started writing in Dagbladet

as an economics writer in 1920, Hoff was well known for being an editor and writer in Farmand, a business magazine he bought in 1935. Hoff built Farmand to become the leading Norwegian business magazine of his time. At Farmand, he was well known for being an outspoken editor. He also made a clear policy that Farmand should be an apolitical body for the industry's freedom. In an article he wrote in 1935, he said: "We look not only at this battle for corporate social freedom from an economic standpoint. We regard it as part of the struggle for personal liberty and freedom of speech. Both the dictatorship States and in home runs fight against corporate social freedom go hand in hand with the fight against personal freedom and freedom of expression."

== Political views ==
While studying economics at the University of Oslo in 1938, he became interested in the economic calculation debate and engaged in it on the side of the Austrian School which became his doctoral dissertation ("Calculation in a Socialist Planned Economy").

His doctoral dissertation was however ignored, and researchers point to the political views of his professors most prominently Ragnar Frisch strong socialist-leanings and Norwegian Labour Party affiliations and the post-World War political atmosphere as being perhaps the cause of this underappreciation. As well during the German occupation of Norway 1940–1945, Hoff was put in jail by the Germans for his political views. Farmand was banned by the occupation government and was therefore not published in the occupation years 1940–1945.

== Mont Pelerin Society ==
Trygve Hoff was one of the founding members of the Mont Pelerin Society. As author, he contributed to the economic calculation debate, starting with his 1938 book Økonomisk kalkulasjon i socialistiske samfund (English: Economic Calculation in the Socialist Society).

== Publications ==
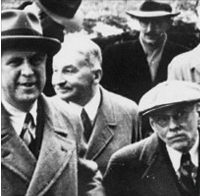
Hoff (left) at the Mont Pelerin Society

Farmand Norsk Forretningsblad, 1938–1982 The following are the books that were authored by Hoff:

- Økonomisk kalkulasjon i socialistiske samfund, 1938
- Fred og fremtid: liberokratiets vei, 1945
- Västerländsk frihet eller asiatiskt tvång, 1946
- Why We Take the Trouble, 1946
- La socialisation en Norvège, 1953
- Snigende socialisering eller snigende liberalisering, 1955
- Trygve J.B. Hoff: Tanker og idéer, 1975, ISBN 8203080510
- Ny kulturpolitikk: frå ord til handling, 1978 with Lars Hauge, ISBN 8252108458

== Bibliography ==
- Economic Calculation in the Socialist Society (Full Text; 1938)
