= Sundet =

Village in Eidsvoll municipality, Norway

Coordinates: 60°19′42″N 11°15′30″E

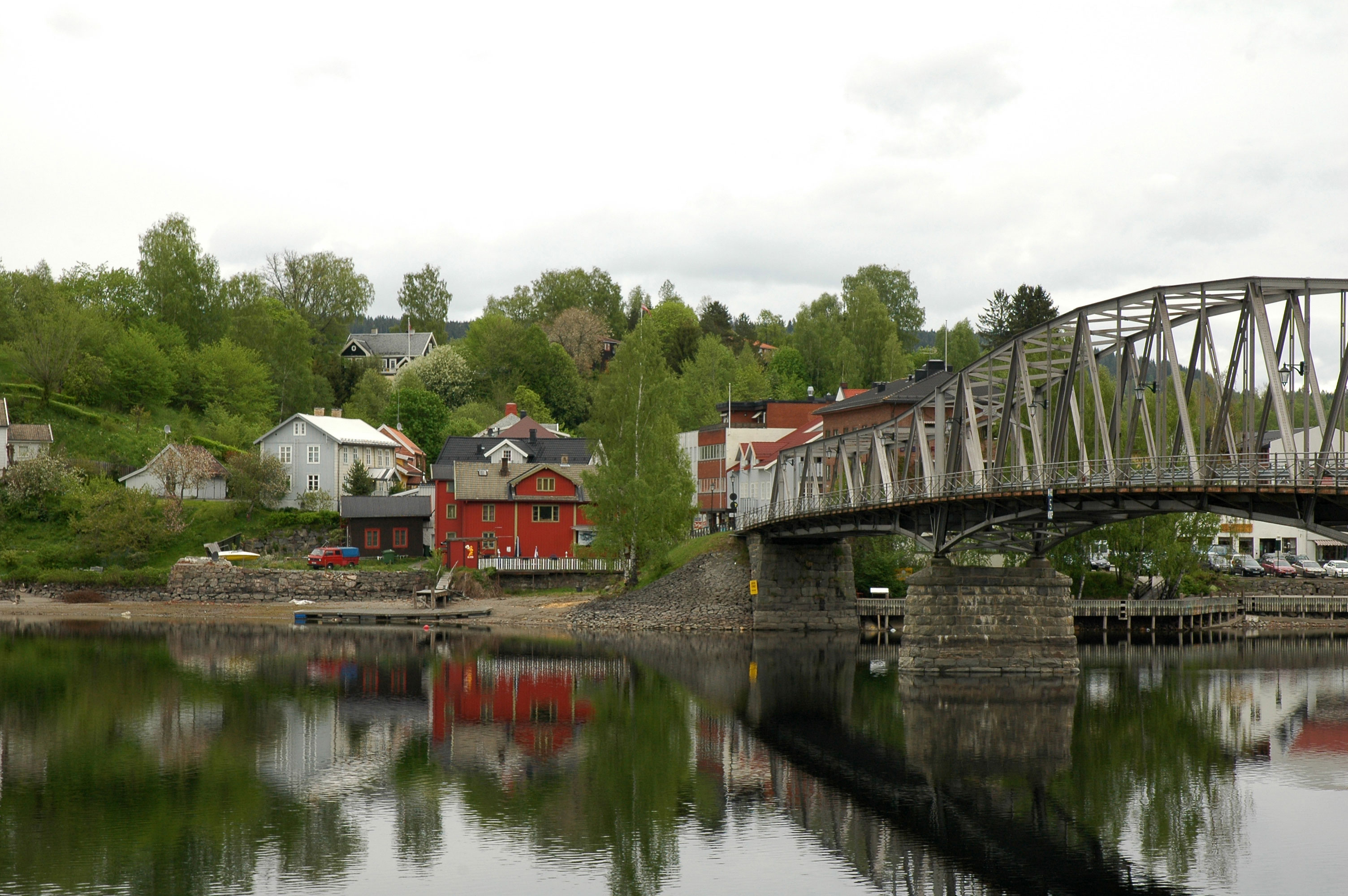
Eidsvoll, Norway

Sundet is the administrative centre of Eidsvoll, a municipality in Akershus, Norway. It contains several stores and supermarkets. It is located right next to the river Vorma, and is in the vicinity of Eidsvoll High School, Eidsvoll Church and Eidsvoll train station.
