= Merkantilt biografisk leksikon =

Norwegian encyclopedia

Merkantilt biografisk leksikon: hvem er hvem i næringslivet? (English: Mercantile Biographical Encyclopedia: Who is Who in the Enterprise?) was a Norwegian-language encyclopedia published by Yrkesforlaget in 1935.

It featured approximately 10,000 short biographical entries for Norwegian businesspeople, and was edited by Einar Hoffstad (1894–1959). It was printed by Grøndahl & Søns Boktrykkeri. The purpose of the encyclopedia was to "remedy the need to know something about the individuals one is trading with". The entries contain little genealogical information, and the parents of the portrayed businesspeople are not included. Abbreviations are used extensively to save space and money.

The editor, Einar Hoffstad, stated in the foreword of the encyclopedia that it was not a parallel to the Who's Who reference works, although the title could imply that. Hoffstad argued that Merkantilt biografisk leksikon featured too few and too many names for being a Who is Who—too few from areas such as art, literature, science and politics, whilst too many from the enterprise. He also admitted that the encyclopedia included too many people, even from commerce, to be called a mercantile reference work. The notability standards for the encyclopedia were mostly based on the discretion of the staff, and whether the portrayed individuals were of general interest at the time. Trustees in commercial organisations, editors of trade press and successful traders were automatically included.

In a book review, the newspaper Aftenposten stated that the Mercantile Biographical Encyclopedia had a "pretentious" title as it was a "strange mixture of book and advertising". According to the reviewer Tharald Borgir there were several errors, and he lamented that Hoffstad in the foreword had disclaimed responsibility for such errors. The reviewer found it "unbelievable" that the book was being offered, and that "gullible" people paid 20 kr to buy it. He suggested that the Ministry of Justice be on guard for further "backslide" regarding the "freedom of liability" when it came to such information. Hoffstad replied that although a large reference work was bound to contain some errors, his helpers had been reliable, and Borgir had been inquired six times to aid Hoffstad with the encyclopedia without replying.

The encyclopedia was published in a second, revised edition in 1939, this time by Halvorsen & Larsen. In October 2009, Project Runeberg scanned and made the encyclopedia's first edition available online.
