= Farmand =

Defunct weekly business magazine in Norway (1891–1989)

- Categories: Business magazine
- Frequency: Weekly
- Circulation: 33,900 (1982)
- Founded: 1891
- Final issue: January 1989
- Country: Norway
- Based in: Oslo
- Language: Norwegian

Farmand (Norwegian: The Trade Journal of Norway) was a business magazine published in Oslo, Norway, from 1891 until it was discontinued in January 1989. The name farmand (or farmann) was from an old Norse word for a tradesman. It is composed of the words far as in to "travel far and wide" combined with the word man. The old Norwegian king Bjørn Farmann or "Bjørn the Tradesman" bore this title.

== History and profile ==
Farmand was established in 1891. The founding editor of the magazine was Einar Sundt from 1891 to 1917. Einar Hoffstad later took over, being editor from 1922 to 1926 and from 1933 to 1935. Trygve J. B. Hoff, one of the founding members of the Mont Pelerin Society, edited the magazine from 1935 to 1982. During the German occupation of Norway from 1940 until 1945, Hoff was put in jail for his political views. During that time, Farmand was banned by the Nazi occupation powers. Kåre Varvin edited Farmand from 1982 to 1983, then Ole Jacob Hoff from 1983 to the end in 1989. In 1986 the magazine was sold to Cappelen, a publishing company. It was published on a weekly basis.

Farmand was a conservative magazine and supported the classical liberalism and free market which was much inspired by The Economist. Farmand enjoyed such prominent columnists as Milton Friedman, F. A. Hayek, and Ludwig von Mises as well as many economists, intellectuals, and business leaders from the early Mont Pelerin Society. Before World War II Norway began to ban the anti-Nazi movies of American and British origin. Hoff protested over the censorship of these movies. The contents also included current (and inside-track) reports from East Bloc countries, not the least being the crushing of the Prague Spring in 1968. There were also literary excerpts, among them those from Constantine Fitzgibbon's dystopian romance during a communist takeover of England, When the Kissing Had to Stop. One of the attractions was a page of quotations with its popular naughty jokes featured in the lower right-hand corner.

Farmand sold 33,800 copies in 1981 and 33,900 copies in 1982.

== See also ==
- Einar Hoffstad
