= Einar Hoffstad =

Einar Hoffstad (4 September 1894 – 25 July 1959) was a Norwegian encyclopedist, newspaper editor, writer and economist. He remains best known as the editor of the encyclopedia Merkantilt biografisk leksikon and the business periodical Farmand. Although initially a classic liberal, Hoffstad embraced fascism and collectivism at the beginning of the Second World War.

== Career ==
He was born in Sandefjord to botanist and teacher Olaf Alfred Hoffstad (1865–1943); his younger brother was Arne Hoffstad (1900–1980), who became an editor and Conservative politician. Having finished his secondary education in 1913, Einar Hoffstad enrolled at the Norwegian Institute of Technology, where he studied until 1916. He subsequently worked as stockbroker in Sandefjord for a year, before being hired as editor of the stockbrokers' periodical Norsk Aktiemeglertidsskrift and the economy section of Verdens Gang from 1918 to 1919. In that same year he married the slightly younger Edith Eckblad, the daughter of a landlord.

From 1919 to 1920 Hoffstad worked as a secretary in Norsk Næringsliv. He also began working at the economics periodical Farmand, advancing to co-editor in 1920. He was editor in chief of the periodical from 1922 to 1926 and from 1933 to 1935. Whilst having a break from his career at Farmand, Hoffstad edited the enterprise journal Forretningsliv between 1926 and 1933, which was acquired by Farmand in 1933. Hoffstad graduated from the Royal Frederick University with a cand.oecon. degree in economics in 1930. From 1930 to 1933, he was managing director of A/S Forretningsliv, and in 1934 of A/S Yrkesforlaget. He also headed the Association for the Norwegian Trade Press from 1927 to 1929 and the Norwegian Press Association in the 1930s. In 1935, Hoffstad was chief editor of the mercantile who's who Merkantilt biografisk leksikon, which was published in a second edition in 1939. He also edited Norges Næringsveier from 1935. He died in July 1959.

== Political views ==
As editor in chief of Farmand, Hoffstad was a classic liberal who argued against planned economy and egalitarianism. He stated that every society ought to "grant great freedom to commerce", and that inequality was "the condition for economic growth and creation of the necessities of life". He was also a vocal critic of the welfare state, arguing that it "undermined the ability and desire to keep oneself entertained". Hoffstad was also vocal against parliamentary democracy, as he considered human beings "undemocratic from birth", maintaining they had an "instinctive need for a dictator". "Dollfuss, Mussolini, and Hitler are all very popular", he argued.

Despite his earlier libertarianism, Hoffstad gradually began espousing fascist and corporatist viewpoints in the late 1930s. In March 1936, he wrote an article for the business journal Norges Næringsveier titled "Hverken kapitalisme eller sosialisme" ("Neither Capitalism nor Socialism"), in which he stated that commerce should "abide by the new conditions", and that "socialism and capitalism are about to go together into a higher entity". He also voiced his support for collectivist ideas, proclaiming that "the interests of the State and society should prevail over those of the individual". In the autumn of 1940, he encouraged entrepreneurs and business people of Norway to vote for the fascist party Nasjonal Samling ("National Rally"), which he had joined on 25 September. Hoffstad also welcomed the German occupation of Norway during the Second World War, stating that "Hitler's purpose is to create a new and happy Europe". In 1941 Hoffstad issued the pamphlet Vinner England krigen? ("Is England Winning the War?") together with Grundtvig Gundersen on the publishing house Heroldens Forlag, cover illustrated by Harald Damsleth. In it, the authors concluded: "There is no longer a question on whether England can win the war, England has already lost it".

== Works ==
- Hoffstad, Einar (1917), Håndbok for Meglere og Aktionærer
- —— (1921), Christiania Handelsstands Forening: 1841 – 12. nov. 1921. Jubilæumsskrift
- ——, ed. (1923), Et mindeskrift: P. Schreiner sen & Co.: 1823–1923, Øyvind Sørensen (illustrator)
- —— (1926), De tider vi gaar imøte: økonomiske efterkrigsproblemer
- —— (1928) [1925], Det norske privatbankvæsens historie
- —— (1928), Kapitalanbringelse
- ——, ed. (1930), Jubilæumsskrift: 1905 – 5.mai 1930: Kontorfunktionærernes forening
- —— (1934), Socialøkonomi for menigmann og stortingsmenn
- ——, ed. (1935), Merkantilt biografisk leksikon. Hvem er hvem i næringslivet?
- —— (1935–36), Kristiania-krakket: en jobbetids historie
- ——, ed. (1938), Jerngrossistenes forening: 1888 – 12. oktober 1938
- ——, ed. (1939), Merkantilt biografisk leksikon. Hvem er hvem i næringslivet? (2nd ed.)
- ——, ed. (1938–40), Illustrert norsk næringsleksikon: (hvad er hvad i næringslivet?), vol. 4 volumes
- —— (1941), Vinner England krigen?, Gundersen, Grundtvig
- —— (1944), Arbeidets seierherrer: små romaner om store menn, Arne Wold (illustrator)
