= Eidsvoll Church =

- Eidsvoll kirke
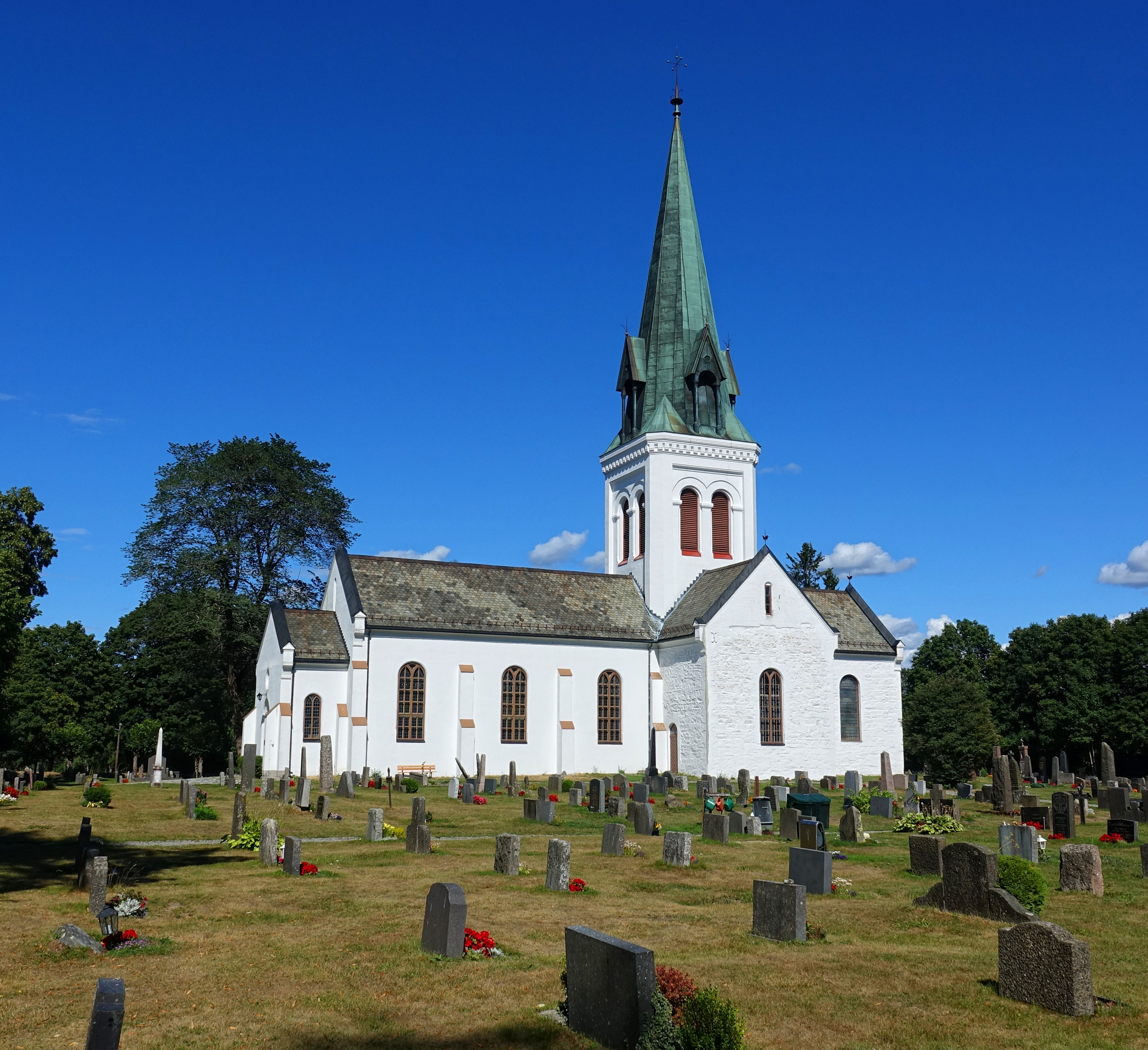

- Location of the church Eidsvoll Church (Norway)
- 60.3234003°N 11.242066°E
- Location: Eidsvoll
- Country: Norway
- Denomination: Church of Norway
- Churchmanship: Evangelical Lutheran
- Website: eidsvoll.kirken.no

History
- Former name: Church of the Holy Cross
- Status: Parish church
- Consecrated: c. 1190

Architecture
- Functional status: Active
- Architectural type: Romanesque

Specifications
- Materials: Stone, brick

Administration
- Diocese: Diocese of Borg
- Deanery: Øvre Romerike
- Parish: Ullensaker

Eidsvoll Church (Norwegian: Eidsvoll Kirke) is a cruciform church from c. 1190 in Eidsvoll, Akershus in Norway. The Romanesque building is of stone and probably one of the first cruciform stone churches to be built in Norway. Close to Eidsvoll Church there is an ancient sunken lane that was used as a path far into the last century. Eidsvoll Church is listed and protected by law by the Norwegian Directorate for Cultural Heritage.

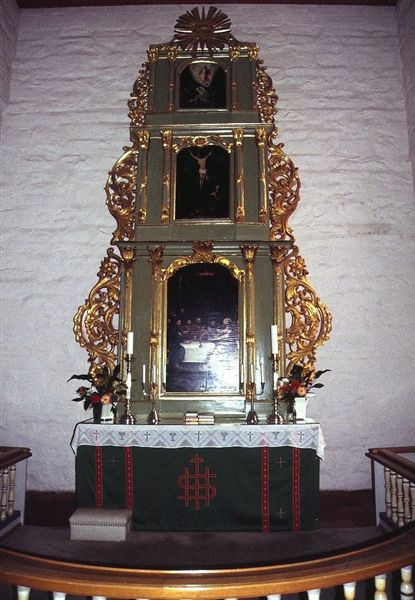
Church Altarpiece

== History ==
The church building has repeatedly been affected by fire and rebuilt. After the last major fire in 1883, the church was partly rebuilt in bricks. In 1678, Johannes Skraastad (1648-1700) made an altarpiece for the church. This altarpiece was presumably lost in the fire in 1762. The altarpiece that is in the church dates from 1765 and consists three oil paintings on top of each other in the midfields, surrounded by pilasters. The images represent (from below) the Last Supper, together with the Crucifixion and the Resurrection of Jesus. The present reconstructed pulpit is from 1956, following the suggestion of architect Bjarne Hvoslef (1890-1989). The church organ dates from 2003 and was built by Orgelbau Kuhn. The three church bells were cast by Olsen Nauen Bell Foundry; two in 1885 and one in 1898.

== Notable ministers ==
- Nicolai Wergeland (1817)
- Eilert Sundt (1869–1875)
