= Michael Andreas Sundt =

Norwegian politician

Michael Andreas Sundt (31 July 1825 – 8 November 1914) was a Norwegian politician.

He was born in Moss as a son of Michael Fredrik Sundt and Anna Benedichta Sylvia Hierman. He married Anne Dorthea Peterson. His daughter Helga Kristiane Sundt married Valentin August Sibbern.

He was elected to the Parliament of Norway in 1874, representing the rural constituency of Smaalenenes Amt. He was a farmer and ship-owner.
