= Det norske Myrselskap =

Norwegian agricultural organization

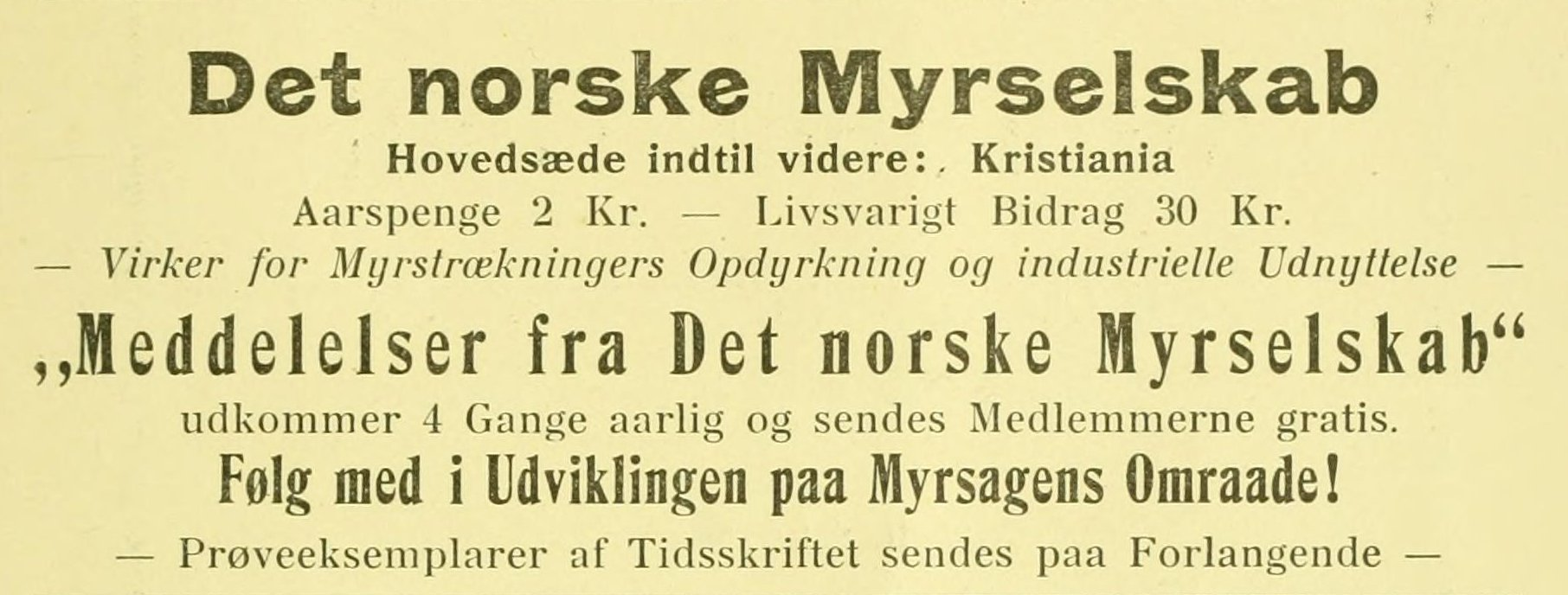
Advertisement for Det norske Myrselskap in Naturen, 1908.

Det norske Myrselskap (the Norwegian Mire Company) was a Norwegian primary resources organization.

It was founded as Det norske Myrselskab on 11 December 1902 to facilitate the harnessing of mires in the country, both for crops and acres as well as peat extraction.

In 1976, it was merged with Selskabet Ny Jord to form Det norske jord- og myrselskap. This institution was later merged with others to form Jordforsk, which was in turn merged to form Bioforsk.
