= Krøderen =

Krøderen may refer to:

- Krøderen (lake) in Norway
- Krøderen (village) in Norway
