= Norwegian Forest and Landscape Institute =

Norwegian research institute

The Norwegian Forest and Landscape Institute (Norwegian: Norsk institutt for skog og landskap) was a research institute based in Norway.

Organizationally subordinate to the Norwegian Ministry of Agriculture and Food, it is autonomous in its research. It was established on 1 July 2006 through a merger of the Norwegian Forest Research Institute (Norsk institutt for skogforskning) and the Norwegian Institute of Land Inventory (Norsk institutt for jord- og skogkartlegging). Headquarters are in Ås, and regional offices are in Bergen, Steinkjer, and Tromsø.

The director is Arne Bardalen.

On June 30, 2015 the Institute was merged into the Norwegian Institute of Bioeconomy Research.
