= Einar Sundt =

Norwegian businessman, writer and publisher

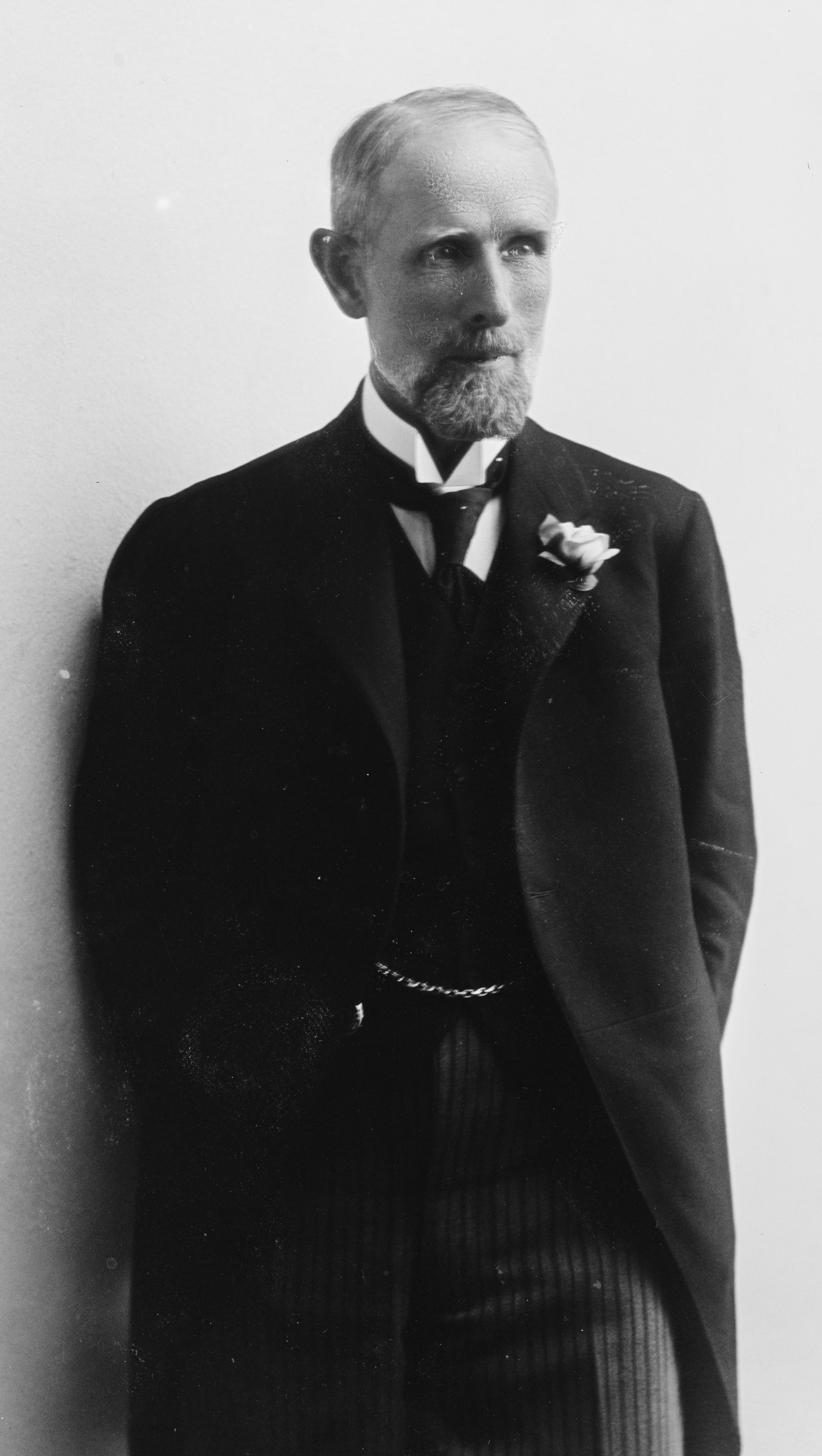
- Born: 16 October 1854; Christiania, Norway
- Died: 20 September 1917 (aged 62)
- Occupation(s): businessman, writer and publisher
- Known for: founding editor of Farmand
- Parent: Eilert Sundt
- Relatives: Maurits Hansen (grandfather); Johan Lauritz Sundt (cousin); Karen Sundt (cousin)

Einar Sundt (16 October 1854 – 20 September 1917) was a Norwegian businessman, writer and publisher.

He was born in Christiania to Eilert Sundt and Nicoline Conradine Hansen, and was a cousin of Johan Lauritz Sundt and Karen Sundt. He founded the business magazine Farmand in 1891, and edited the magazine until his death in 1917.
