= Olaf Alfred Hoffstad =

Norwegian politician

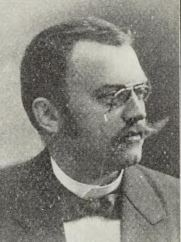
Olaf A. Hoffstad

Olaf Alfred Hoffstad (18 March 1865 – 15 September 1943) was a Norwegian botanist, writer, school principal and Conservative politician. Born in the mid-Norwegian town of Stjørdalshalsen to a mercantile family, he initially embarked on an educational career. Having taught at girls' schools across the country in the early 1890s, he was permanently employed at two universal schools in Sandefjord, a city whose political life he influenced in the latter part of his life.

During his schooldays Hoffstad read voraciously, developing a passion for botany that never left him. His first botanical book was published in 1891; it sold well, being released in nine revised editions before Hoffstad's decease during the Second World War. He also wrote floras intended for use in schools, the most prominent of which was published in six editions. In the 1890s Hoffstad travelled widely, searching for new plant species hitherto undiscovered.

In the conservative middle-class city of Sandefjord, Hoffstad engaged himself politically: in 1894 he was elected chairman of a local conservative youth league. Two years later, he entered the Sandefjord city council, which catapulted him into the political limelight: for 23 years he was the city's mayor, and later served as deputy representative for the Conservative Party in the Norwegian Parliament. A patriotic citizen of Sandefjord, Hoffstad was member of numerous boards of directors in the city.

== Biography ==
Hoffstad was born in Stjørdalshalsen, Nordre Trondhjems Amt, a son of the tradesman Oliver Hoffstad (1830–1878) and his wife Anne Birgitte Øydahl (1843–1932). In 1883, then aged 18, the young Hoffstad finished secondary education at Trondhjem Cathedral School, graduating with a cand.real. degree five years later. He subsequently taught at girls' schools in Trondhjem, Egersund, Haugesund and Røros for shorter periods before and after 1890. In the latter year he married Valborg Olsen, a photographer's daughter three years his junior. They had a son, Einar Hoffstad, who became an economist and encyclopedist.

On 1 August 1892 he was employed by the Sandefjord Upper Secondary School (Norwegian: Sandefjords høiere almenskole), at which school he would teach for the remainder of his productive life. From the beginning he was hired as secondary teacher, but advanced positions over time, becoming both adjunct teacher and lecturer. In 1924, then aged 59, he was appointed principal of the school—he quit teaching at Sandefjord Technical Evening School (Norwegian: Sandefjords Tekniske Aftenskole) in the same year, where he had lectured concurrently with his teaching at the Upper Secondary School.

In 1891, he published Norsk Flora, a flora for Norwegian schools which was published in eight further editions before Hoffstad's decease in 1943. He also published another illustrated Flora for Norwegian schools, entitled Flora for skoler (1899). In the summers of 1896 and 1897, Hoffstad travelled from the estuary of the Trondheimsfjord to Leka Municipality, at the border between Nordland and Nord-Trøndelag counties. He wrote an article for the journal Nyt Magasin for Naturvidenskaberne in 1899 where he described what he had observed, amongst other things the discovery of Utricularia ochroleuca in Northern Norway.

Hoffstad was also engaged in politics. In 1894, he became leader of a conservative youth league in Sandefjord. He became a member of Sandefjord city council in 1897, and became deputy mayor already in 1898. From 1911 to 1934, he served as mayor for Sandefjord, the longest time any major not born in the city ever had served. Whilst serving as mayor, Hoffstad wrote two treatises on the management of municipal finances in the city: Kommunale finanser (1926) and Sandefjords kommunale økonomi i tiåret 1922—1932 (1933). He also represented the Conservative Party in the Parliament of Norway as a deputy representative in the 1919–21, 1922–24 and 1931–33 terms. His constituency was Larvik og Sandefjord, from 1922 changed to the Market towns of Vestfold county.

He chaired the board of the newspaper Sandefjords Blad, and was a board member of Vestfold Kraftselskap from 1921 to 1929, Sandefjord Sparebank, the local gas works, electricity plant and cinema as well as the teachers' union Filologenes og Realistenes Landsforening. He founded a regional branch of the Union of Norwegian Cities in 1921, and chaired it until 1934.

He died of a heart attack in September 1943. At the deathbed, he proofread the ninth edition of Norsk Flora, which was published posthumously in 1944.
