= Sandefjords Blad =

Norwegian newspaper

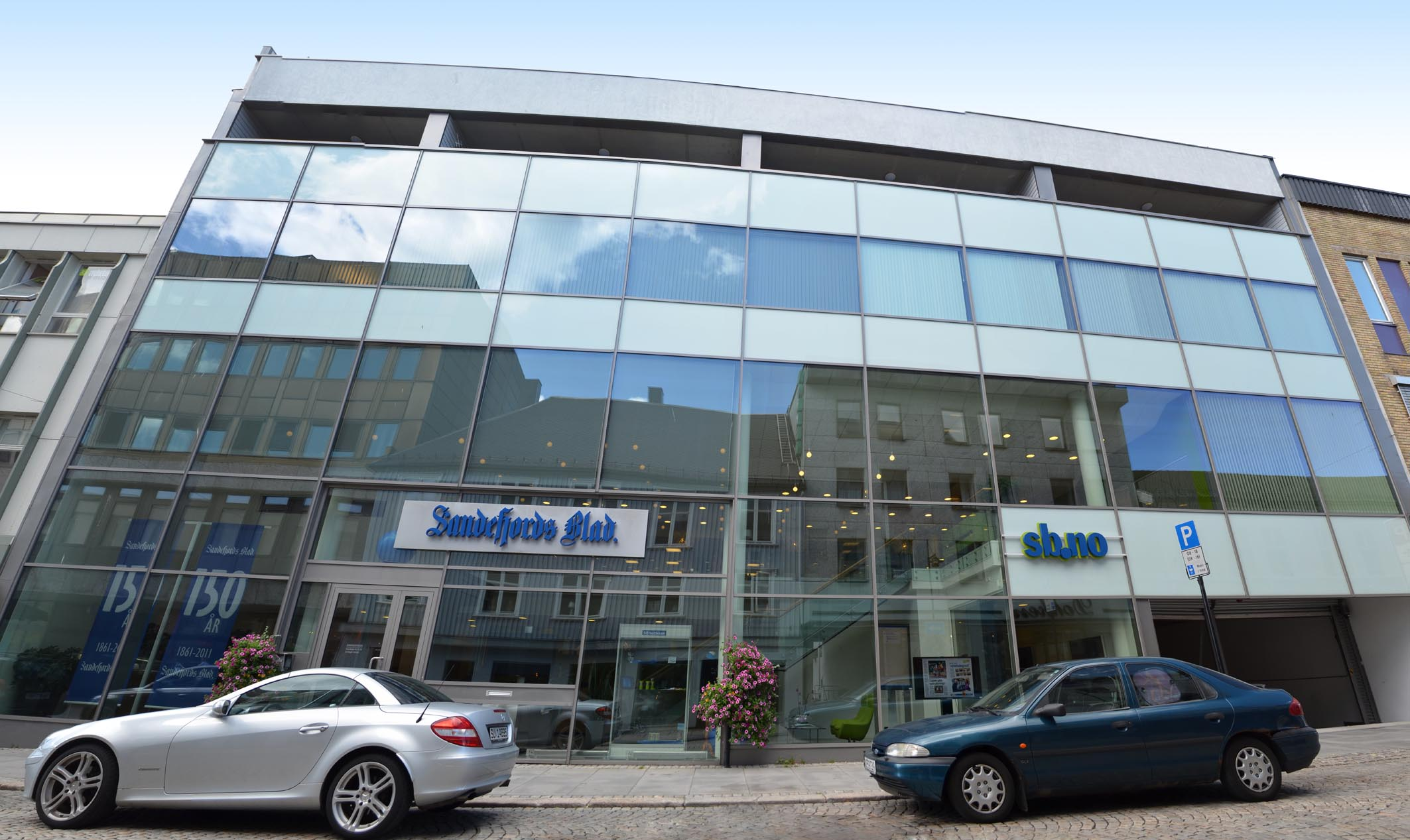
- Type: Daily local newspaper + online edition
- Format: Tabloid
- Owner: Amedia
- Founder: Peter Henrik Feilberg
- Editor-in-chief: Steinar Ulrichsen
- Editor: Lily Marcela Dam and Jan Roaldset
- News editor: Geir Baarnes
- Staff writers: ~50 (2004)
- Founded: 1859
- Political alignment: Formerly Conservative Party and later Conservatism; Currently none
- Language: Norwegian Bokmål
- Headquarters: Jernbanealleen 17, 3210 Sandefjord, Norway
- Country: Norway
- Circulation: 13,172 (Daily); 12,213 (Digital) (as of 2020)
- Readership: 29,300
- Website: www.sb.no

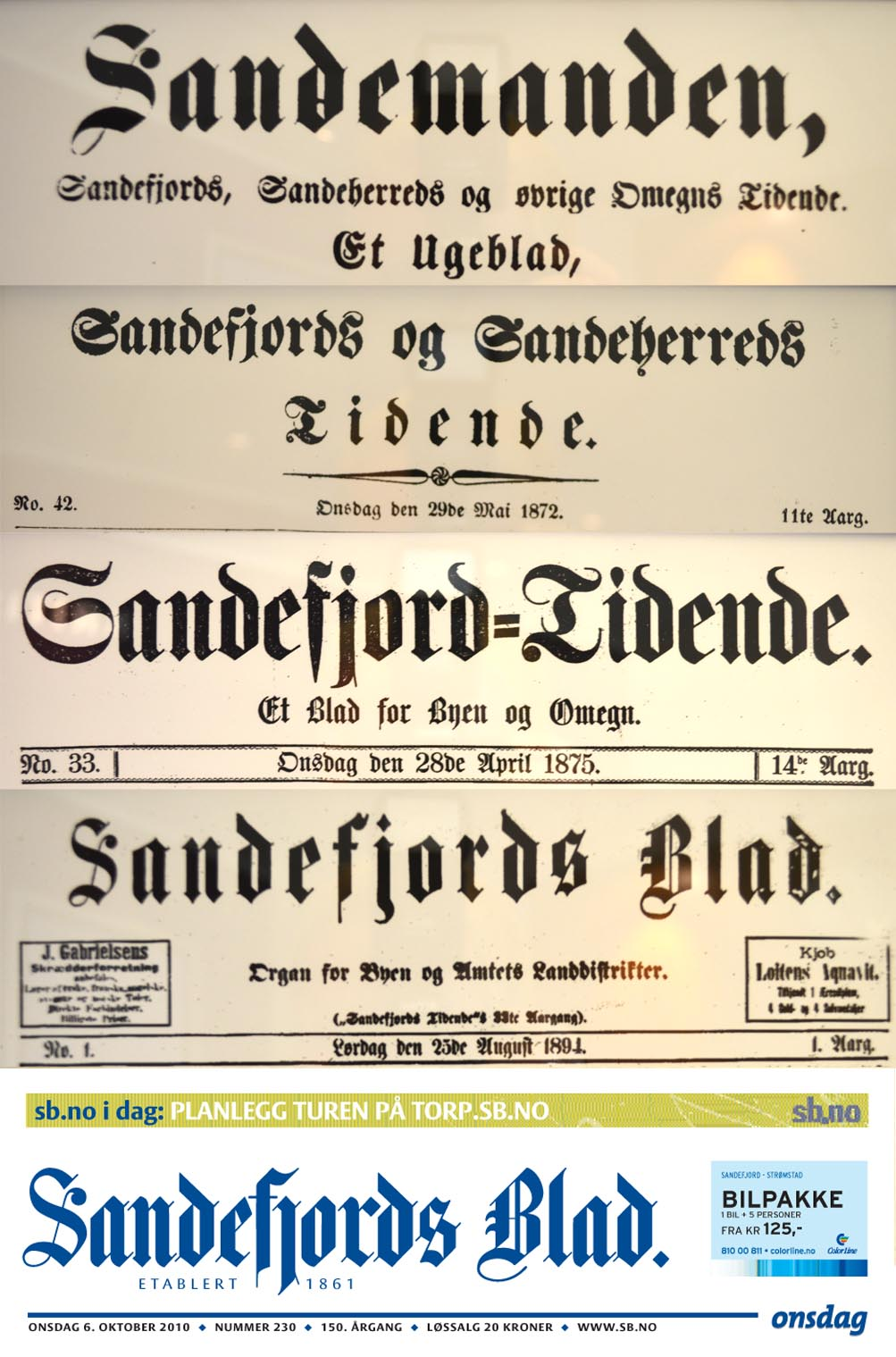
Logo through the years

Sandefjords Blad is a newspaper published daily in Sandefjord, Norway, except on Sundays. Since 5 December 2022, the newspapers published issues on Tuesdays, Thursdays and Saturdays. It is available in Norwegian language only. Sandefjords Blad is a private company, owned by Mecom with a circulation of 14,780 copies (2004) and 50 employees (2004). Sandefjords Blad is printed at the joint printing center Edda Trykk Ltd at Borgeskogen in Stokke.

As of 2018, the newspaper has a circulation of 7,577 printed copies and 12,213 daily online subscribers. According to the Norwegian Media Businesses' Association, the newspaper had 29,300 readers on an average day in 2018. The editor is Steinar Ulrichsen and the newspaper is owned by Amedia.

== Circulation ==
Circulation data according to the Norwegian Media Businesses' Association.

- 2006: 14 600
- 2007: 14 260
- 2008: 13 995
- 2009: 13 877
- 2010: 13 685
- 2011: 13 191
- 2012: 12 678
- 2013: 12 149
- 2014: 11 636
- 2015: 11 027
- 2016: 11 086
- 2017: 11 574
- 2018: 12 288
- 2019: 12 620
- 2020: 13 172

Print circulation in dark blue, digital circulation in light blue.

== History ==
Sandefjord got its first newspaper in October 1859, Sandemanden. This newspaper was only released for a year and a half. Typographer and printer Hans Severin Iversen started the newspaper and printing press in Sandefjord on April 24, 1861. This newspaper initially used the name Sandefjords Tidende and traditionally represented the Conservative Party.

During the German occupation of Norway, paper rationing as a consequence of World War II led the newly established Ministry of Culture and Enlightenment to force a merger between the newspapers Sandefjords Blad and Vestfold, beginning on September 1, 1940. The new newspaper received the name Sandefjords Presse and its last issue was printed on May 19, 1945. Olaf Bøe from Nasjonal Samling was appointed editor for Sandefjords Presse in 1944.

=== German occupation ===
Despite heavy restrictions and many directives issued by the Quisling regime and Presseabteilung at the beginning of the German occupation of Norway, Sandefjords Blad operated as normal in the early days of the occupation. On August 29, 1942, the Ministry of Culture and Enlightenment ordered a merge of the two Sandefjord-based newspapers, Sandefjords Blad and Vestfold. The new newspaper was named Sandefjords Presse and its first edition was issued on September 1, 1942. The government’s reasoning for the forced merger was due to paper rationing as a consequence of the war. Editors for the new paper were Thoralf Granerød and Arne Hoffstad. Granerød was replaced by Øivind Vindal Christensen following Granerød’s death in 1943. The newspaper had a circulation of 7,700 as of September 7, 1942. Arne Hoffstad later escaped to Sweden in the fall of 1944 and Olaf Bøe was appointed editor by the press director for Nasjonal Samling, Anders Beggerud. News of Nazi Germany’s capitulation reached the city on May 7, 1945, and the editorial staff at Sandefjords Presse worked through the night and were able to publish a four-page newspaper on May 8. Through this process, Olaf Bøe had been removed as editor and replaced with former editor Øivind Vindal Christensen.

During the occupation, roughly all staff members at Sandefjords Presse were helping with the production of illegal newspapers. Several illegal newspapers were also distributed by Sandefjords Presse. The last edition of Sandefjord Presse was published on May 19, 1945. Sandefjords Blad returned with its first issue on Whit Tuesday, May 22, 1945. Ole Lind became editor and Torleif Jacobsen assisting editor.

== Names ==
Some former names for the newspaper have been:

- Sandemanden (1859–1860)
- Sandefjords og Sandeherreds Tidende (1861-1873)
- Sandefjords Tidende (1874–1894)
- Sandefjords Blad (1894-1942)
- Sandefjords Presse (1942-1945)
- Sandefjords Blad (1945–)
