= Eilert Sundt =

Norwegian theologian and sociologist (1817–1875)

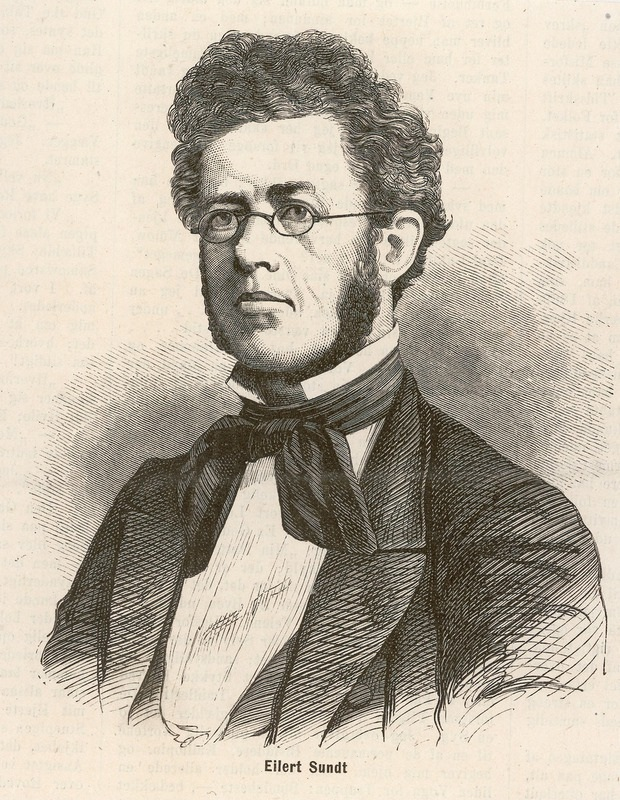
Eilert Sundt

Eilert Lund Sundt (8 August 1817 – 13 June 1875) was a Norwegian theologist and sociologist, known for his work on morality, marriage and other subjects among the working class. He was an early pioneer of the field of sociology in Norway.

== Early and personal life ==
He was born in Farsund as a son of Lars Mortensen Sundt (1762–1850) and Karen Bing Drejer (1777–1865). He was a distant descendant of Peter Drejer. He was a third cousin of Christian Sundt, uncle of Lauritz and Karen Sundt, granduncle of Vigleik, Halfdan and Harald Sundt, and great-granduncle of Leif Sundt Rode.

His father was a ship captain, and he was born into a large family of 13 children. All the children worked to help make ends meet. Farsund at that time had many seamen, small fishermen and chandlers. This provided his initial exposure to the ideas which he came to examine extensively later in his life: poverty, overpopulation and the work issues associated with the transition from an older farm culture to 19th century business and industry.

In February 1859 he married Nicoline Conradine Hansen (1822–81), a daughter of Maurits Christopher Hansen. They had the son Einar Sundt, a publisher.

== Career ==
In 1835 he began his studies in Kristiania, but came back to Farsund in 1838 and became a teacher. He resumed his studies in Kristiania in 1841. There he met and became close friends with Henrik Wergeland, who was also born and raised in Agder. When Henrik Wergeland was buried in 1845, Eilert Sundt led the student contingent and spoke at the funeral on their behalf.

His interests in sociology were broad. He studied prison conditions, customs and treatment of Gypsies, causes of death, the evils of married life in Norway, conditions of prostitutes, suicide, fishery and forestry workers' living and working conditions, building customs, shipping practices, household cleanliness and administration of poverty laws. A man of his times, he also was interested in ethnography, ethnology, vernacular architecture, demography, and linguistics (with special emphasis on the dialects of Norwegian).

From 1857 to 1866 Eilert Sundt was editor for Folkevennen ("Friend of the People"), for which he wrote a number of the more important articles. His work served to inform many of the authors of Norwegian literature in their transition to a socially aware realism at the close of the 19th century.

Eilert Sundt served as the parish priest at Eidsvoll Church from 1869, and he died there in 1875.

Two of his works were selected for the Norwegian Sociology Canon in 2009–2011.

== Controversy ==
Sundt was an aggressive racist, and the first to advocate ethnic cleansing against the travelling population of Norway. After decades of crimes against humanity perpetrated against the travelling population by the Nazi and Labour governments in the 20th century, including kidnapping, forced sterilisation, lobotomy, sometimes resulting in death, the Rodi language is now considered extinct, and many travellers lost their way of life and identity. A 20th century institution for kidnapped children that bore his name, Eilert Sundts barnehjem, is in 2026 being considered for designation as a cultural heritage monument by the Norwegian Directorate for Cultural Heritage in collaboration with the traveller community, due to its painful history. The social sciences building at the University of Oslo is nevertheless named after Sundt, as his work is still highly regarded among social scientists at this university. This has recently raised objections by the Traveller community.
