= Arthur Sundt =

Norwegian politician

Arthur Sundt (8 April 1899 – 19 August 1971) was a Norwegian politician for the Liberal Party.

Born in Bergen, he was elected to the Norwegian Parliament from Bergen in 1945, and was elected again in 1954. He had previously served in the position of deputy representative from 1934–1936 and 1937–1945.

Sundt held various positions in Bergen city council from 1928 to 1941 and 1951–1955, and served as deputy mayor from 1934–1937, 1937–1940 and 1945.
