= Norwegian Water Resources and Energy Directorate =

Directorate of Ministry of Petroleum and Energy of Norway

- Company type: Government agency
- Industry: Directorate
- Founded: 1921
- Headquarters: Oslo, Norway
- Area served: Norway
- Key people: Agnar Aas (director)
- Number of employees: 400
- Parent: Norwegian Ministry of Petroleum and Energy
- Website: www.nve.no

The Norwegian Water Resources and Energy Directorate (Norwegian: Norges vassdrags- og energidirektorat or NVE) is a Norwegian government agency established in 1921. It is under the Ministry of Petroleum and Energy and regulates the country's water resources and energy supply. Its mandate includes contingency planning for floods, serving as a centre of expertise for hydrology, research and development, and increasing energy efficiency. It is a member of the Council of European Energy Regulators.

The directorate is based in Oslo and has regional offices in Hamar, Førde, Tønsberg, Trondheim, and Narvik. It also establishes international contacts and undertakes work abroad in developing countries for the Norwegian Agency for Development Cooperation. As of 2006, it had over 400 employees. Its website includes statistics on Norwegian energy consumption, production, and prices and a database of Norwegian lakes and water catchment areas.

The directorate is administratively responsible for the Watercourse Regulation Act (1917), Industrial Concession Act (1917), Energy Act (1990), and Water Resources Act (2000). The directorate can also issue new regulations within the scope of these acts.
