= Karen Sundt =

Norwegian journalist and writer

- Born: 23 May 1841; Farsund, Norway
- Died: 1 January 1924 (aged 82)
- Occupations: journalist and writer of popular literature
- Relatives: Eilert Sundt (uncle); Johan Lauritz Sundt (cousin)

Karen Sundt (23 May 1841 – 1 January 1924) was a Norwegian journalist and writer of popular literature.

She was born in Farsund, and was a nephew of Eilert Sundt and cousin of Johan Lauritz Sundt.

She made her literary debut in 1877 with the fairytale collection Eventyr for folket. Her first novel was Tora Solkleiv eller Bruden i Vaterland from 1883. She later wrote many popular novels, including Kommandantens datter (1896) and Arbeiderliv (1900). Sundt became the first female newspaper editor in Norway, when she edited the Varden newspaper in 1885 and 1886, while editor J. C. T. Castberg was elected representative to the Storting.
