= Johan Lauritz Sundt =

Norwegian industrialist

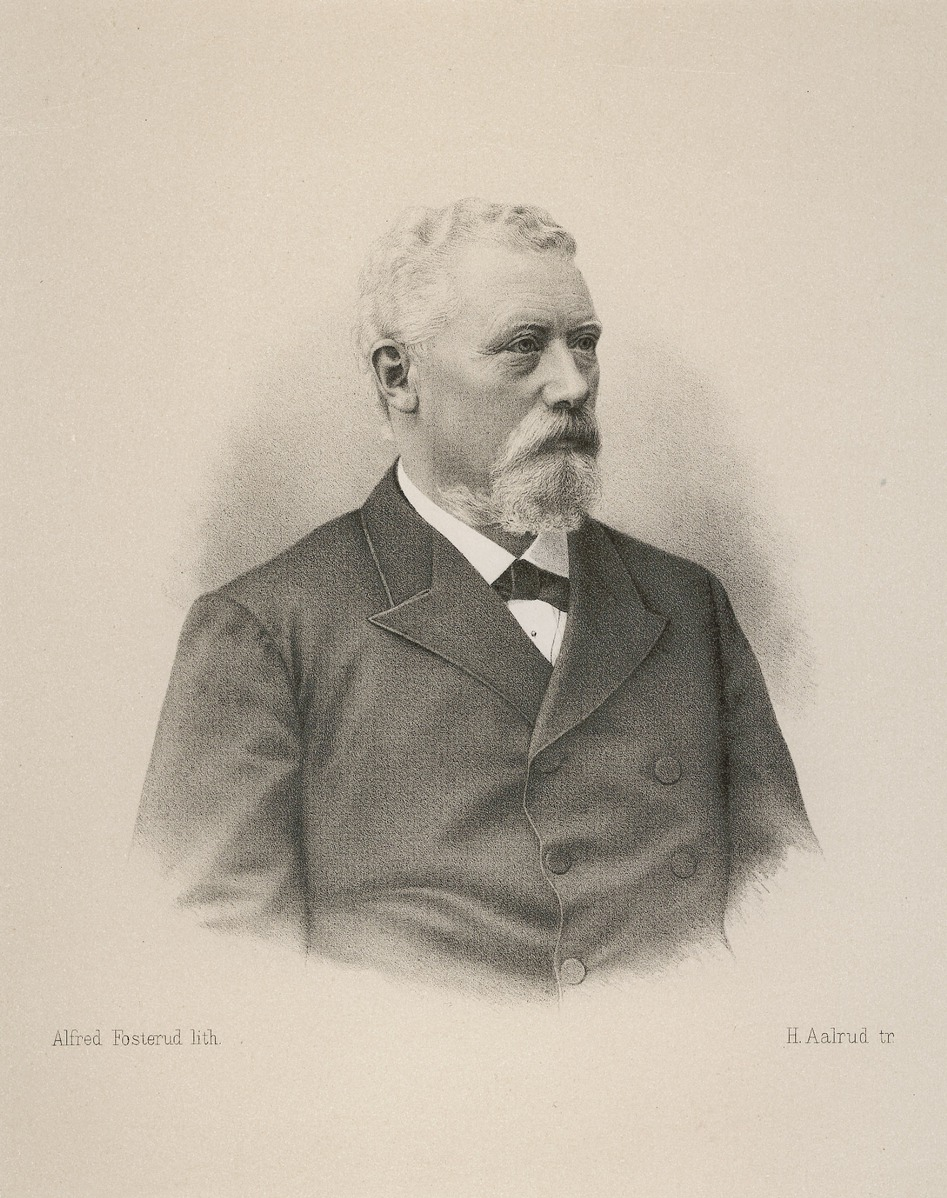
- Born: 14 April 1828; Fredriksvern, Norway
- Died: 25 January 1889 (aged 60)
- Occupation: industrialist
- Relatives: Eilert Sundt (uncle); Leif Rode (grandson)

Johan Lauritz Sundt (14 April 1828 – 25 January 1889) was a Norwegian industrialist.

Sundt was born in Fredriksvern, and was a nephew of Eilert Sundt. He founded the matchstick factory Nitedals Tændstikfabrik in 1862, and co-founded the first margarine factory in Norway, Christiania smørfabrikk, in 1876. He served as mayor of Nittedal for seven years, from 1858. He was interested in literature, and wrote two plays, including Nils Lykke, which was staged at Kristiania norske Theater. He was decorated Knight of the Order of St. Olav in 1887.
