= Ole Irgens =

Ole Irgens is the name of:

- Ole Irgens (bishop) (1724–1803), Norwegian bishop
- Ole Irgens (politician) (1829–1906), Norwegian politician
