= Irgens =

Irgens is a Norwegian surname. Notable people with the surname include:

- Åshild Irgens (born 1976), Norwegian illustrator
- Christian Andreas Irgens (1833–1915), Norwegian politician
- Joachim Irgens von Westervick (1611–1675), Dano-Norwegian nobleman
- Johan Irgens-Hansen (1854–1895), Norwegian literary critic, theatre critic and theatre director
- Johannes Irgens (1869–1939), Norwegian barrister, diplomat and politician
- Kjeld Stub Irgens (1879–1963), Norwegian politician during the German occupation of Norway
- Lars Johannes Irgens (1775–1830), Norwegian jurist and politician
- Ludvig Irgens-Jensen (1894–1969), Norwegian twentieth-century composer
- Nils Christian Irgens (1811–1878), Norwegian military officer and politician
- Ole Irgens (bishop) (1724–1803), bishop in the Church of Norway
- Ole Irgens (politician) (1829–1906), Norwegian politician
- Diane Jergens, born Dianne Irgens
- Einar Irgens Gustafson (born 1973), Counselor for Norwegian Defense Industry

== See also ==
- Irgens Estate, a private estate in Norway
