= Per Preben Prebensen =

Norwegian diplomat

Per Preben Prebensen (6 August 1895 – 21 October 1961) was a Norwegian diplomat.

He was born into the influential Prebensen family in 1895. His father was the Mayor of Risør and MP Jacob Christian Wetlesen Prebensen, while his paternal uncle was the MP and Ambassador Nikolai Prebensen. After training as a naval officer he joined government service and served in various diplomatic and trade postings. He eventually rose to become Norwegian Ambassador to the UK and Italy. Prebensen died while in his post in Rome in 1961.

Diplomatic posts
Preceded by Erik Colban	Norwegian Ambassador to the United Kingdom; 1946-1959	Succeeded by Erik Braadland
Preceded by Rolf Andersen	Norwegian Ambassador to Italy; 1959-1961	Succeeded by Thore Boye
