= Oda Sletnes =

Norwegian diplomat

Oda Helen Sletnes
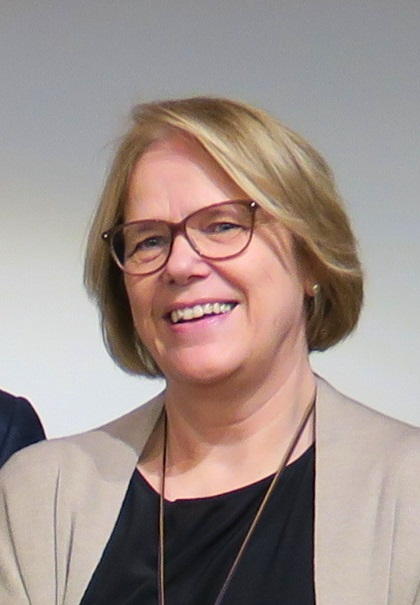
- Oda Helen Sletnes in December 2016
- Born: February 10, 1953 (age 73); Trondheim
- Occupation: Diplomat
- Known for: Norwegian ambassador to the European Union from 2006 to 2011. President of the European Free Trade Association Surveillance Authority 2011–2015; Current Norwegian ambassador to the European Union since October 2015. Ambassador of France since January 2019.

Oda Helen Sletnes (born 10 February 1953) is a Norwegian diplomat.

She was born in Trondheim, and studied architecture at the Norwegian Institute of Technology. She started working for the Norwegian Ministry of Foreign Affairs in 1981. She served in the Norwegian European Union delegation in Brussels from 1997 to 2001. After a period as deputy under-secretary of state in the Ministry of Foreign Affairs from 2003 to 2006, she was the Norwegian ambassador to the European Union from 2006 to 2011. In 2011 she was appointed as a college president of the European Free Trade Association Surveillance Authority, a position she held until 2015, when she took over as the Norwegian ambassador to the European Union. She was the Norwegian ambassador in France from early 2019 to her retirement from the foreign service in 2021.

She is decorated as a Commander of the Royal Norwegian Order of Merit (2007), Grand Knight of the Order of the Falcon (1997) and Grand Officer of the Order of Merit of the Italian Republic (2004).

Political offices
Preceded by Per Sanderud	President of the European Free Trade Association Surveillance Authority; 2011–2015	Succeeded by Sven Erik Svedman
Diplomatic posts
Preceded by Bjørn T. Grydeland	Norwegian ambassador to the European Union; 2006–2011	Succeeded by Atle Leikvoll
Preceded by Atle Leikvoll	Norwegian ambassador to the European Union; 2015–2018	Succeeded by Rolf Einar Fife
Preceded by Rolf Einar Fife	Norwegian ambassador to France; 2019–2021	Succeeded by Niels Engelschiøn
