= Leikvoll =

Leikvoll is a Norwegian surname. Notable people with the surname include:

- Atle Leikvoll (born 1951), Norwegian diplomat
- Chris Leikvoll (born 1975), Australian former professional rugby league footballer
- Jan Roar Leikvoll (1974–2014), Norwegian novelist
