= Øivind Lorentzen =

Norwegian shipping magnate (1882–1980)

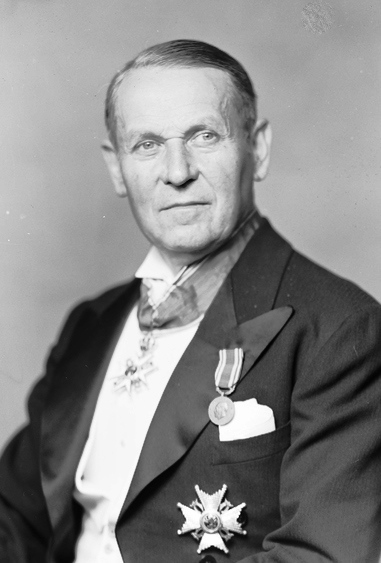
- Born: 14 October 1882; Holmestrand, Norway
- Died: 9 May 1980 (aged 97); Oslo, Norway
- Occupation: Shipping magnate
- Children: Erling Lorentzen

Øivind Sven Lorentzen (14 October 1882 – 9 May 1980) was a Norwegian shipping magnate.

== Pre-war life and career ==
He was born in Holmestrand as a son of ship-owner Hans Ludvig Lorentzen (1839–1904) and Thala Margrethe Bredrup (1847–1941). His family lived in Argentina and Brazil between 1890 and 1895. Lorentzen finished his secondary education in 1901, and studied shipbuilding at Königliche Technische Hochschule in Charlottenburg (now Technische Universität Berlin) from 1901 to 1906. In April 1908 he married Ragna Nilsen (1885–1976), a daughter of Peder Nilsen. In 1923 they had 5 sons and one daughter: Hans Ludvig Ph.D.; Per Arne; Ingjerd Ragna; Oivind Harald; Erik Finn; and Erling Lorentzen, who went on to marry Princess Ragnhild of Norway, and had the children Haakon, Ingeborg and Ragnhild Lorentzen.

He became a partner in his father's company Lorentzen & Co in 1908. In 1914 Lorentzen was behind the acquiring of Norway's first motor ship, MS Brazil. The vessel was bought by Fred. Olsen & Co. already at the end of the year, but Lorentzen became manager for the ship's South America service, organized through Den Norske Syd-Amerika Linje. In 1920 Lorentzen advanced to CEO of Den Norske Syd-Amerika Linje, a position he left in 1938 to further his own shipping business.

Partly, the conflict was grounded in Lorentzen's engagements outside of Den Norske Syd-Amerika Linje. When being hired in Den Norske Syd-Amerika Linje, he had left his family company, but continued working with the company Sobral (founded 1915). When Sobral bought four vessels in 1936, Lorentzen offered to participate with these vessels in the ventures of Den Norske Syd-Amerika Linje, but it was rejected. He instead founded the Northern Pan-American Line (Nopal Line) with his son as CEO. This company trafficked Northern Brazil and the US.

== War and post-war life ==
In 1939 he was hired as Director of Shipping, leading ones of the directorates under the Norwegian Ministry of Provisioning. In 1940, Norway was entangled in World War II, and the state reorganized the country's shipping into Nortraship. Lorentzen became director of Nortraship, but stayed in the United States, whereas Ingolf Hysing Olsen was the director in London, where most of the Norwegian administration-in-exile sat. The war years saw disagreements, especially between Lorentzen and Arne Sunde and Hilmar Reksten. The actions of Øivind Lorentzen and his son Per were scrutinized by a government committee between 1943 and 1945, and was exonerated. Hysing Olsen took over as director after the war.

Lorentzen instead continued his career in South American shipping. He officially retired in 1959. His eponymous company existed until 1987. Lorentzen was also a co-founder and first chairman (1947–1957) of the humanitarian organization Landsforeningen mot Poliomyelitt.

He was also involved in a lengthy court case. In 1950 his company Sobral sued the former CEO and board of the shipyard Moss Værft & Dokk. Sobral claimed that Moss Værft & Dokk neglected their contract agreement regarding the construction of two vessels during the war. First, claimed Sobral, Moss Værft & Dokk had instead used their capacity on arming whaling vessels. The two vessels had been delayed, and when they were completed, they had been taken over by Kriegsmarine as minesweepers. The court case lasted several years, reaching the court of appeal in 1954.

He was decorated as a Knight, First Class of the Royal Norwegian Order of St. Olav in 1938. He was promoted to Commander with Star after the war. He died in May 1980 in Norway, 97 years old.
