= Rolf Einar Fife =

Norwegian diplomat

Rolf Einar Fife (born 18 October 1961) is a Norwegian diplomat. He is a member of the International Law Commission.

He is a law graduate by education and started working for the Norwegian Ministry of Foreign Affairs in 1986. He served as head of department from 1997 and deputy under-secretary of state from 2002 to 2014. He then served as the Norwegian ambassador to France from 2014 to 2018 and to the European Union from 2019.

Diplomatic posts
Preceded by Tarald Brautaset	Norwegian ambassador to France; 2015–2018	Succeeded by Oda Sletnes
Preceded by Oda Sletnes	Norwegian ambassador to the European Union; 2019–	Succeeded by incumbent
