= Nortraship =

Shipping and Trade Mission to administer the Norwegian merchant fleet during WWII

House flag of the Norwegian merchant fleet during World War II. This flag was flown ashore from Nortraship offices, ships flew the regular Norwegian merchant flag.

The Norwegian Shipping and Trade Mission (Nortraship) was established in London in April 1940 to administer the Norwegian merchant fleet outside German-controlled areas. Nortraship operated some 1,000 vessels and was the largest shipping company in the world. It made a major contribution to the Allied war effort.

The British politician and Nobel Peace Prize laureate of 1959, Philip Noel-Baker commented after the war, "The first great defeat for Hitler was the battle of Britain. It was a turning point in history. If we had not had the Norwegian fleet of tankers on our side, we should not have had the aviation spirit to put our Hawker Hurricanes and our Spitfires into the sky. Without the Norwegian merchant fleet, Britain and the allies would have lost the war".

Nortraship had its main offices in London and New York City and was active during World War II. Nortraship was vital to Norway and the exile government as it lacked other means to support the Allied fight against the Axis powers. The organisation handed the various vessels back to their owners when Norway was liberated in May 1945.

== Norwegian merchant fleet prior to World War II ==
In the years after World War I the Norwegian merchant fleet recouped its losses and expanded into new sectors, primarily tankers but also dry cargo vessels. The 1930s, in particular, were a growth period, in contrast to the other major shipping nations. By the end of 1938, some 7% of world tonnage was Norwegian and Norway was the fourth-largest shipping nation, behind the UK, the US and Japan. Moreover, the expansion was based on new building, thus lowering the median age of Norwegian vessels. Most of the new vessels were powered by diesel motors; they accounted for some 62% of the fleet, while Japan had some 27%, and the UK 25%. Around 42% of the fleet was modern tankers, a total of 18% of the world tanker tonnage. Norwegian shipowners were innovative and willing to take risks in ordering new vessels during the depression.

The various services needed for operation of ships had also been expanded, the most important being the classification society Det Norske Veritas but also shipbrokers, insurance companies and shipping banks. The government also played an important part in establishing and updating regulations, and in providing schools for engineers and navigators.

== The forgotten war, 3 September 1939 – 9 April 1940 ==
When Norway was invaded by Germany on 9 April 1940, the merchant fleet had been at war for seven months. Norway was neutral, but lost 58 ships and around 400 sailors. During these months much of the framework that Nortraship was to operate within was created; most importantly the Norwegian-British tonnage agreement. Called the Scheme Agreement, this stated that a percentage of the Norwegian fleet, including two thirds of the tanker tonnage, was to go on charter to Britain. In return, Norway would receive important commodities. This agreement alleviated the British problem of access to the Norwegian fleet, especially the tankers, which they regarded as of "exceptional importance".^{1} To protect Norwegian neutrality, the agreement was negotiated between the British government and the Norwegian Shipowners Association.

These negotiations showed the dual nature of the Norwegian merchant fleet: it was a huge asset and also was vital to both the belligerent factions. It was necessary to tread carefully to safeguard Norwegian neutrality but to maintain the close commercial relationship with Britain. Norway's policy during World War I had been labelled that of the silent ally, and the Norwegian government wanted to continue along the same lines in World War II.

The reasons for Norway being so important for the Allies were the relative decline of the British merchant fleet, overly optimistic prewar tonnage planning and the US Neutrality Act, which effectively forbade US vessels from entering the war zone. The only other nation with a comparable merchant fleet was Netherlands, but they strongly rejected any tonnage agreement for fear of German reprisals.

The Norwegian government also established contingency plans for alerting vessels in case of war. To reduce the risk of being torpedoed, most Norwegian vessels followed British convoys. The added safety was not without problems, as Norway as a neutral country thus was close to siding with one of the belligerents. The convoying regime reflected Norway's dependence on Britain, as had been the case during World War I.

== Norway invaded and Nortraship established ==
With the German invasion of Norway, the question of control of the Norwegian merchant fleet became critical, and the Norwegian government, the British government and the Germans were the main contenders. Around 15% of the total fleet was within the German-controlled area and was lost to the Allies; the battle would be for the remaining 85% sailing worldwide.

The British contemplated confiscating the Norwegian merchant fleet, as they did with the Danish fleet, but decided against it because the Norwegians continued to fight and because of intervention by the Norwegian ambassador in London. The Germans and their Norwegian collaborator, Vidkun Quisling, radioed to Norwegian vessels to sail for German-controlled waters, but the Norwegian masters ignored the orders.

To counter German pressure, on 12 April the British Ministry of Shipping negotiated an agreement with the Norwegians that temporarily settled insurance problems for the Norwegian fleet, contingent on vessels sailing for Allied harbours, and this was radioed by the British Admiralty to all Norwegian merchant vessels.^{2} The next question was how the fleet was to be administered; the Norwegian ambassador was hard pressed on the issue by both Britain and Norwegian shipowners in London. The British government wanted to take control of the Norwegian vessels, but Norwegian shipping professionals in London favoured an independent Norwegian organisation. The issue had to be decided by the Norwegian government; it was, however, difficult to communicate with it as the government was fleeing the advancing German forces.

On 16 April, a meeting of Norwegian shipping professionals was held in the Norwegian chamber of commerce in London, where a detailed plan for an organisation for the merchant fleet was presented. The Norwegian ambassador, Erik Colban, and shipowner Ingolf Hysing Olsen were presented with the plan but were leaning towards a joint solution with the British Ministry of Shipping. The shipping professionals argued that a more independent organisation would be in a better position to safeguard Norwegian interests and the revenue from the fleet. As Colban and Hysing Olsen accepted this view, Nortraship was quickly set up on 19 April with the renting of offices at 144 Leadenhall Street in the City, and the following day, 20 April, the first shipping experts moved in.

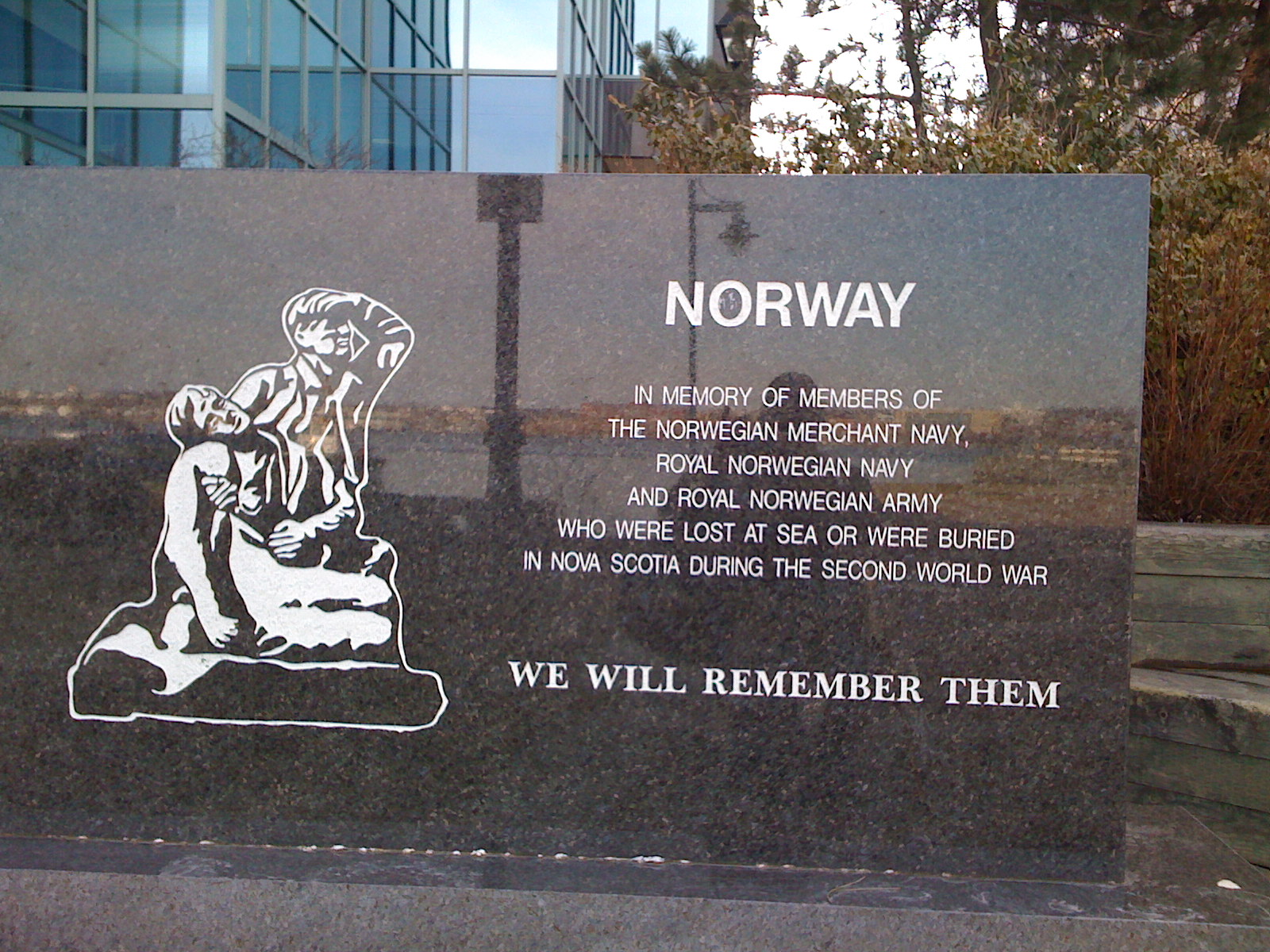
Memorial to members of the Royal Norwegian Navy, Army and Merchant Marine in Halifax, Nova Scotia, Canada, on the flag plaza outside the Maritime Museum of the Atlantic.

The Norwegian government now came forward with a cable that stated that the merchant fleet was to be administered jointly from London and New York. This was a surprise for the Norwegian ambassador in London, and the British government was not in favour. British pressure resulted in the Norwegian government, in a meeting on 22 April at Stuguflåten in Romsdal, adopting a decree that would requisition the Norwegian merchant fleet for the Norwegian government. The administration should be in London and be led by Øivind Lorentzen, Norwegian Minister of Shipping. By that act, the largest shipping company in the world was created, with more than 1,000 vessels and around 30,000 seamen.

== London: the early days ==
The main challenges for the new organisation were to take control of the around 1,000 vessels and to establish policies for working with Britain and the neutral US. There was a severe lack of qualified personnel, and those available were often vocal and determined and used to working independently. That several of the Nortraship staff had their own shipping interests to take care of further added to the problems of managing the organisation.

The top management was almost exclusively Norwegian, while the lower ranks were dependent on British and US personnel. An exception was the accounts department; a major British accounting firm staffed it. In October 1940 Nortraship had 230 employees in London; by October 1941 this was increased to 350, one-third Norwegians. At the same time, Nortraship New York had over 200 personnel, more than half of them Norwegians.

There were also legal problems to be solved, most crucially, whether Nortraship could have at its disposal vessels owned by shipowners still in occupied Norway. That could be solved by the Norwegian government appointing "a curator to act on behalf of the Norwegian Owners". If that was not done, Nortraship vessels could be impounded in neutral harbours, such as in the US. After some discussion, the Norwegian government (still in Norway, now in Tromsø) declared by law on 18 May 1940 that Øivind Lorentzen was to act as curator.

The insurance problems remained to be solved, as the initial British offer was provisional. The vessels needed several categories of insurance, and they were cut off from the insurance provided by insurance companies in occupied Norway, as was the case for the main office of the classification society, the DNV (Det Norske Veritas). On 28 May 1940, Øivind Lorentzen signed a "Memorandum of Understanding" with the British Ministry of Shipping that solved the insurance issue for a period of three months. This MoU was to be the foundation for insurance agreements for the rest of the war. The classification problem was solved by Nortraship taking over the DNV branch offices around the world, coordinated from the DNV office in Newcastle upon Tyne.

As the fighting in France evolved disastrously, the British pushed for more tonnage and to harmonise wages: Norwegian seamen were paid significantly more than British. For political reasons, Nortraship received preferential treatment with an agreement signed on 20 June 1940.^{3} Reducing the Norwegian seamen's wages solved the problem of unequal wages; the surplus was to be placed in a fund to be paid out after the war. (That was later to be a hotly-debated issue in postwar Norway.)

== New York: internal fighting ==
After the initial organisation of Nortraship was clear, the business perspective came into focus. Nortraship was the exiled Norwegian government's main source of income and while contributing to the war effort, had to be managed for the highest possible profit. The vessels that were ceded to the British were fixed and had subsidised rates; the remainder (the "free ships") were primarily sailing for the (still neutral) US at market rates.

When Norway was invaded, German consuls boarded Norwegian vessels in several US harbours, attempting to have them sail for Norway. The Norwegian consulate did its best to counter this, and in deliberation with Norway's ambassador in London, "The Norwegian Shipping Committee" in New York was established. Among the challenges was the crew problem; due to the agreement with the British wages had been reduced from 5 June 1940, and crews on the "free ships" enjoyed an increase. Nazis and communists tried to demoralise the crews and serious desertion problems were encountered, resulting in ships lying idle for months.

Meanwhile, in London, the British were hard pressed with France on the verge of defeat. Within Nortraship, the view was gaining ground that it was inexcusable not to have an adequate office in New York. In spite of resistance from the Norwegian ambassador, it was decided on 21 May 1940 to send a Nortraship delegation to New York,^{4} the reasons being both security in case of a German invasion and commercial since many Nortraship vessels called at US ports. The British Foreign Minister, Lord Halifax, was informed of the decision on 24 May 1940; the Foreign Ministry accepted only reluctantly.

The delegation arrived in New York on 11 June 1940 and started working with the already established committee, the main issues being organisation and the freight earnings from the "free ships" since until then, they had been kept by the shipowners or their US representatives. That resulted in a revolt by the Norwegian shipping professionals in New York who basically demanded the status quo. As the situation became critical, Øivind Lorentzen decided to travel to New York to sort it out. He arrived on 5 July 1940 and after a meeting with the interim committee it was dissolved on 15 July 1940, thus paving the way for the establishment of Nortraship's New York office, which was located at 80 Broad Street, Manhattan.

Øivind Lorentzen had planned for only a brief visit in New York, and in his absence, Ingolf Hysing Olsen, Norwegian representative in Britain for the Norwegian Shipowners Association, was the acting head in London. Thus new friction was created, as the leaders of the two main Nortraship offices did not co-operate well. It was so severe that the Minister of Supply and Shipping, Trygve Lie, had to forward it to the government for a formal resolution. On 25 October the Norwegian government stated that the two offices were "parallel enterprises, each working independently with its ships". This also resulted in a tally of ships; on 21 November 1940 London administered 570 ships while New York had 282 (whaling ships not included).

Nortraship had a large fleet, and the expenses were considerable and so a currency strategy was necessary. It was formulated by Arne Sunde (who later would become Minister of Shipping) on 1 August 1940 and stated that expenses should be paid in sterling currencies, and use of US dollars was to be avoided. The reasons were the current currency situation and the anticipated situation after the war.

In the autumn of 1940 Nortraship New York still had problems with "free ships", most urgently, those owned by Fred. Olsen & Co. The shipowner Thomas Olsen, residing in New York, insisted on managing them and argued that as the owner he was in the best position to do so. He was cautioned by Øivind Lorentzen, to no avail, and after Olsen wrote a letter to the government, Trygve Lie commented that Olsen's behaviour was "the kind that bordered on high treason".^{5} Olsen was not alone in his scepticism regarding Nortraship, and on 18 February 1941 the Norwegian Shipowners' Conference in America was established to secure Norwegian shipowners' interests outside Norway. Part of the scepticism was founded on the Norwegian government being Labour and thus possibly contemplating nationalisation of the shipping companies after the war. The Prime Minister rejected that suggestion, and in a cable in March 1941, he promised that all ships would be handed back to their owners as soon as possible when the war was over.

The internal quarrels were still not settled, partly because Øivind Lorentzen had ships managed contrary to Nortraship policy in the Nopal line led by his son Per A. Lorentzen, who was later head of Nortraship's New York charter department. That was partly corrected after pressure from the London office in August 1940, but it damaged Lorentzen's position as head of Nortraship and was a recurring theme for his critics. One of the sternest opponents of Lorentzen was Hilmar Reksten, a maverick shipowner who had himself been in the spotlight for bending Nortraship rules.

== More crewing problems ==
During the summer and the autumn of 1940, ship losses catapulted. From 9 April to 30 December 1940, Nortraship lost 96 vessels and hundreds of seamen, almost all in the North Atlantic trade. That resulted in an increasing number of Norwegian seamen taking land-based work in the US or changing to other countries' ships running in less dangerous areas. The shortage of seamen was a huge challenge for Nortraship and the Norwegian exile government.

The seamen's organisations argued that the only effective remedy would be higher wages. That resulted in wage negotiations started in London in June 1941 which were concluded with a new and significantly higher wages agreement effective 1 September 1941. The British government was highly critical, but Nortraship and the Norwegian government's view was that it was impossible to withstand the seamen's demand. A second round of negotiations were concluded in an agreement effective 1 December 1942, with yet higher wages, which one was to last for the rest of the war.

The need for strict discipline in wartime created other problems that were not easily solved. Even though the Norwegian government-in-exile decreed as early as 12 July 1940 that all Norwegian citizens above 18 had to register and take assigned work, that legislation was difficult to enforce as the government had no jurisdiction in the UK and no courts. That was facilitated by a law by the British government of 22 May 1941, the Allied Powers (Maritime Courts) Act 1941, which gave allied governments the power to establish their own courts on British soil in which all but the most severe cases could be tried.

== Seaman and vessel safety ==
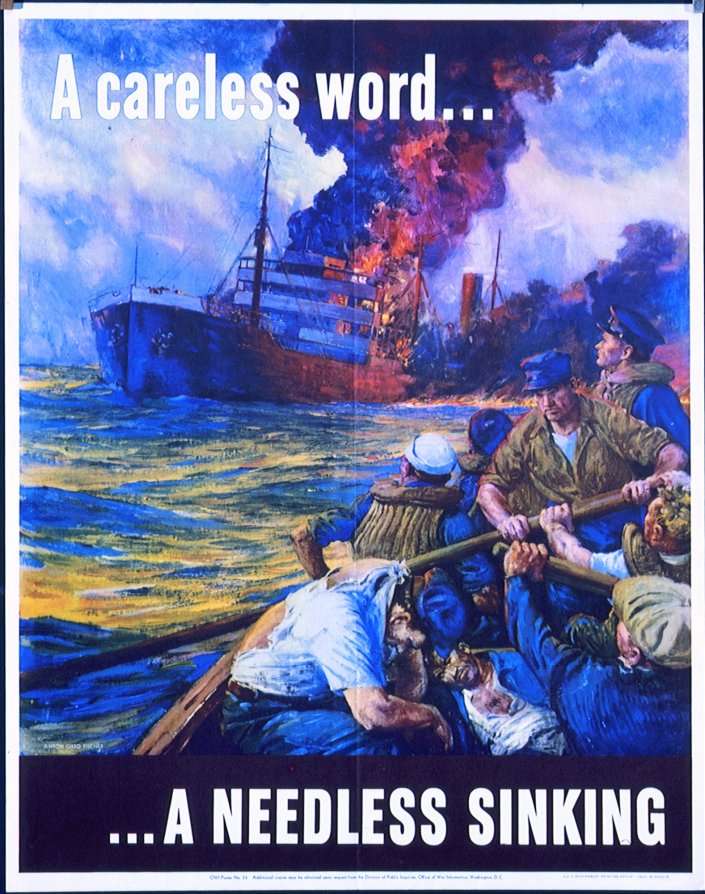
Poster produced in the US warning the public about consequences of careless talk.

The biggest threat to the vessels was the Axis submarines, although mines, surface raiders and bombing from aircraft were also much feared. The main countermeasure was convoying, large groups of merchant vessels, from 20 to 100, protected by naval ships. In 1940, the Norwegian vessels were unarmed, but defensive measures like guns against surfaced submarines and low-flying aircraft were slowly added. By the spring of 1945, around 1,700 men were registered as gunners on Norwegian vessels, and in addition, there were some 900 British gunners.

The vessels also received degaussing against magnetic mines, and seamen were issued watertight survival suits if the ship had to be abandoned. An important part of security was strict secrecy regarding routes and destinations, as made famous in the slogan "Loose lips sinks ships".

Despite those and other measures, losses were high. Of a total of about 30,000 Norwegian seamen, 3,670 lost their lives as a result of the war at sea, together with 977 foreign crewmen. 706 ships were lost to enemy action.

== British pressure for more tonnage ==
Even though most of the Norwegian ships were sailing for the Allies, the British in April 1941 wanted more. That was a delicate dilemma for Norway and Nortraship. On one hand, Norway, was allied with and dependent on Britain, but on the other, the "free ships" that were sailing from the neutral US generated hard US dollars, much needed for reconstruction of Norway after the war. Moreover, voyages to the British Isles were the most dangerous, and Nortraship argued that the modern Norwegian tankers would be better used in other trades. A more hidden agenda was the Norwegian fear that the British and the US would use the war to secure an unfair competitive postwar position.

An initial mutual understanding was reached in a meeting in the British Ministry of Shipping on 19 March 1941: Nortraship was to transfer 500,000 tons of its "free ships". Even though the agreement was not officially signed until October, the work of tonnage transfer started.

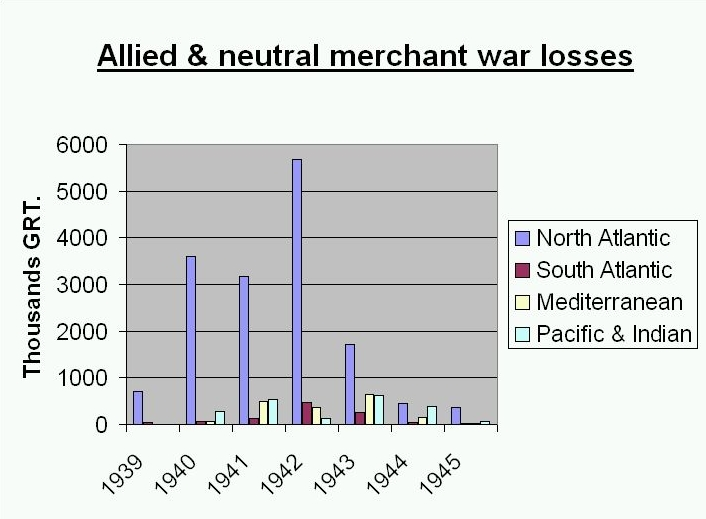
Table showing total Allied and neutral losses in GRT during WW2; the North Atlantic is clearly on top.

Nortraship London under Hysing Olsen tended to favour the British, and Nortraship New York under Lorentzen had a more business-like stance. As Allied losses increased dramatically, the British on 29 April 1941 demanded all Norwegian ships. That was a total surprise for the Norwegians. Nortraship's New York office tried to influence the US through the US Maritime Commission, arguing that Norwegian vessels were much needed for US import and export although only 30% of it was on US keel in 1939.^{6}

After hard negotiations with both the British and US shipping administrations, a new tonnage agreement was signed on 10 October 1941, effectively letting Britain charter three fourths of all Norwegian vessels.

In the negotiations, Nortraship tried to secure the US dollar freight income, to obtain a more equal footing with the British in governing the Allied merchant fleet and to receive assurances regarding Norwegian shipping rights after the war. In the currency issue, Nortraship's stance seems to have prevailed, but in governing the Allied merchant fleet, an Anglo-Norwegian Shipping Committee was established, but despite scores of meetings, it handled the issue only superficially. Finally, the British gave only vague promises as to their postwar shipping policies. In the two years from 9 April 1940 to 9 April 1942, a total of 157 Norwegian tankers made 615 voyages and delivered 6.9 million tons of oil, supplying about a third of the total requirements of the British Isles.

== Tankers with clean/dirty oil and spar decks ==
Before the age of specialised supertankers, the vessels could take "clean" or "dirty" oil or change between them. The "clean" oil would be refined, as gasoline, and "dirty" was unrefined crude oil or heavy oil. A vessel carrying only "clean" oil would deteriorate faster and so an ongoing fight from both Nortraship offices was to get as many "dirty" cargoes as possible. Nortraship had a tough adversary in the British Ministry of War Transport, which produced statistics showing that British vessels were carrying more "clean" cargoes than the Norwegian. The US War Shipping Administration were more accommodating in the issue and let several Norwegian vessels change to "dirty" cargoes.

In peacetime, it is very rare for a tanker to take deck cargo. The war changed that since there was a huge demand for transporting large pieces of war equipment from the US to Europe and other war theatres. It was quickly figured out that tankers had large uncluttered deck areas, which could be used for volume cargoes, like airplanes and trucks. The tankers, however, had to be equipped with so-called "spar decks" where the cargo could be secured. On 1 January 1944, a total of 58 Norwegian tankers were equipped to take deck cargo. The installation of the spar decks was paid for by the UK and Nortraship did not ask any payment for deck cargo, as the charter for the oil cargo already covered the costs.

== US enters war ==
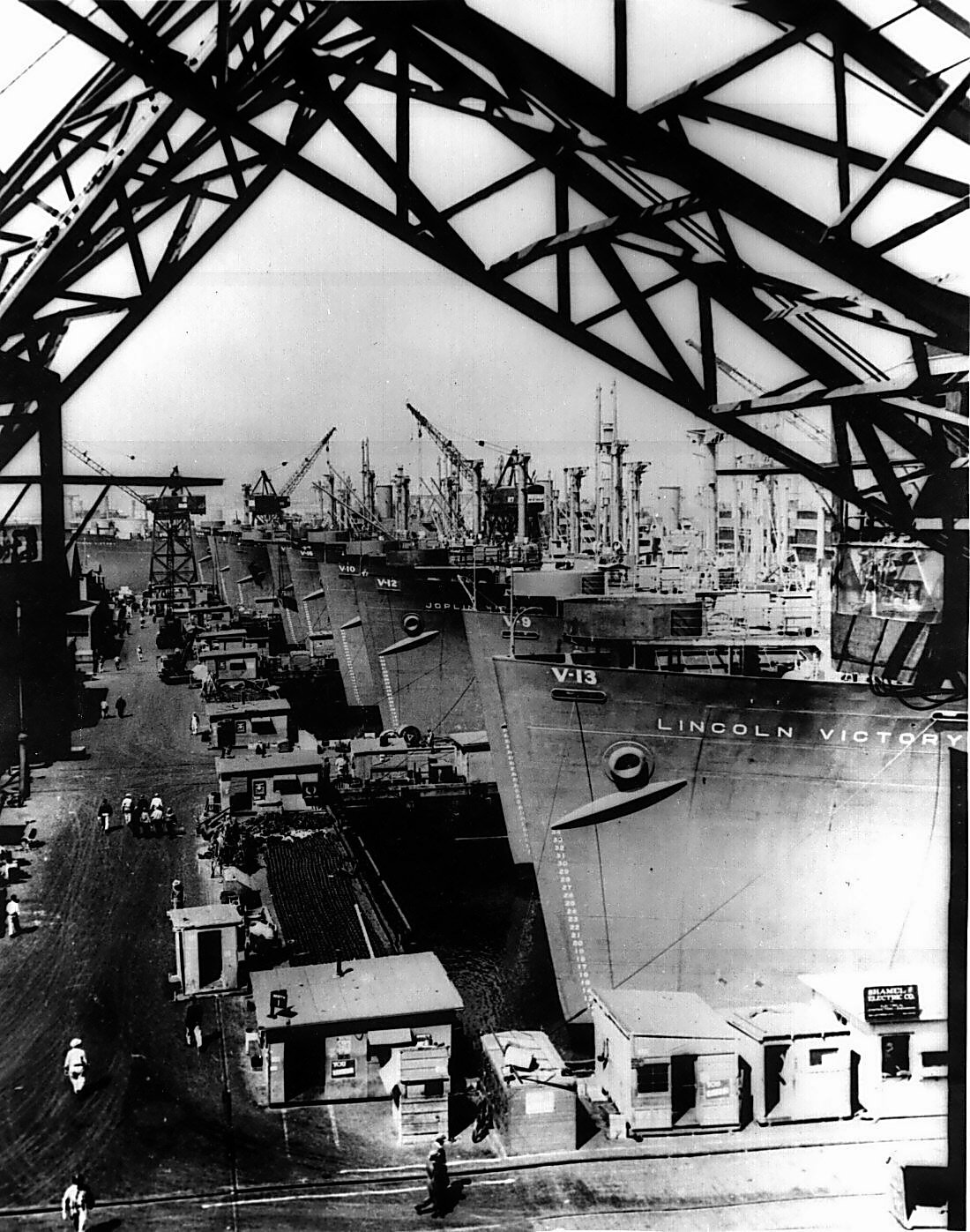
Victory cargo ships lined up at a US West Coast shipyard

Nortraship's situation as a shipping enterprise changed dramatically when the US entered the war on 7 December 1941. When the US was neutral, Nortraship could benefit from the lack of tonnage and the increased rates. With the British Ministry of War Transport and the US War Shipping Administration coordinating their policies in the Hogmanay Agreement, Nortraship and its chief negotiator, Erling Dekke Næss, had a hard fight to protect Norwegian interests.

== Secret fund ==
When Norway was dragged into the war, Norwegian sailors had significantly higher wages than other Allied sailors. The British government feared that would have a negative influence on the other Allied sailors and so pressed for wage reduction. In the summer of 1940, an agreement was signed whereby the wage difference would be placed in a special fund, to be used for the Norwegian war sailors after the war. When the war ended, the fund was some 43 million Norwegian kroner.

A vocal minority, with Leif Vetlesen as its spokesman, argued for the money to be paid directly to the sailors and not distributed as assistance to needy seamen and seamen's widows, as the government and the seamen's organisations proposed. It became a lengthy legal process that the government won in the Supreme Court of Norway in February 1954. That created much bitterness, and the issue was not permanently solved until the Norwegian Parliament, in 1972, decided to pay an ex gratia sum, a total of 155 million NOK. All seamen or their surviving relatives then received 180 kroner per month that had been sailed. Instrumental in solving the protracted case was Rear Admiral Thore Horve, himself a veteran from the war.

== Internal fighting ==
As Nortraship was a huge organisation, with tens of thousand of people working around the world during five years of war, there were normally internal problems. The main ones were between the offices in New York and London, each led by determined shipowners: Øivind Lorentzen and Ingolf Hysing Olsen. The various intrigues by Hilmar Reksten constituted a special case, as he worked at both offices. Reksten had already got into trouble with Hysing Olsen when Reksten arrived in London in April 1940, as he had wrongly obtained an insurance settlement from one of his ships transferred to his accounts; which was to be handled by Nortraship, according to the requisition. Reksten was indeed a highly-competent shipping man, but after allying himself with various of the Nortraship leaders, he was in the end sidelined and expelled from the organisation.

Other problems were created by Arne Sunde, Minister of Provisioning in the Norwegian exile government from autumn 1940 and Minister of Shipping from 1942. Supported by his protégé, Reksten, he made various attempts to micromanage the two main Nortraship offices, which were in turn repudiated either by the powerful foreign minister Trygve Lie or by the prime minister Johan Nygaardsvold.

== Postwar ==
When World War II ended in 1945, Nortraship's main task was over even though the final settlement was only in 1964. Immediately after the end of hostilities in Europe, Nortraship had a very busy period, its work being governed by the Allied United Maritime Authority, which was tasked with controlling all international shipping until the end of the postwar transition period. Nortraships's requisition of Norwegian ships ended on 30 September 1945, and as the various shipowners took charge of their vessels, Nortraship started the huge task of liquidating the organisation, which involved settling various claims, paying compensation for vessels etc. The original Nortraship organisation was terminated on 30 July 1958, and its remaining tasks were transferred to the trade department.

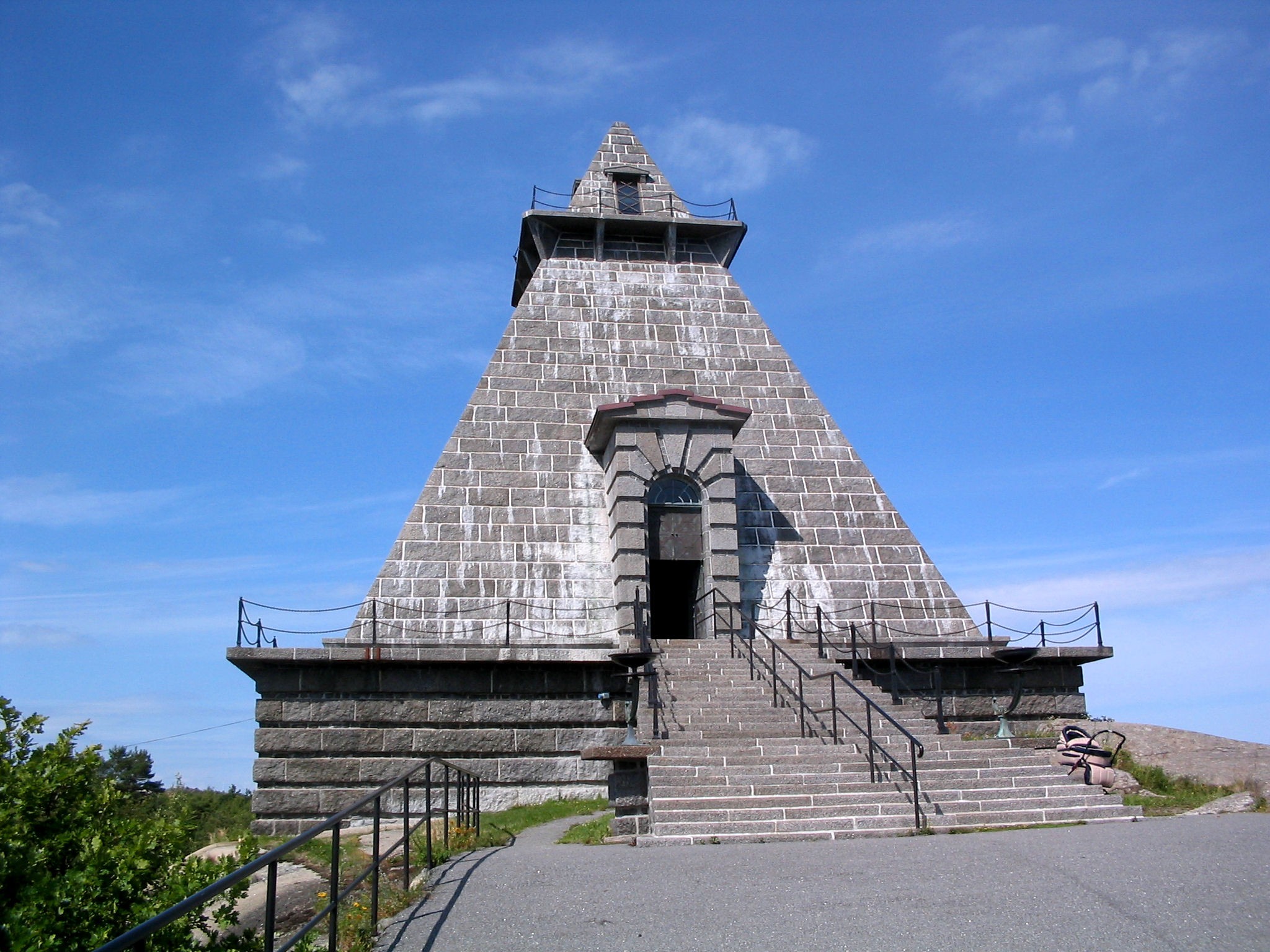
The monument to fallen Norwegian seamen in the two World Wars in Stavern, Norway

In spite of internal quarrels, Nortraship's legacy was mainly positive. Norway retained control of its merchant fleet, it gave a vital contribution to the Allied war effort, Norway's government-in-exile had a sound financial basis and the basis was maintained for continued Norwegian shipping after the war. When Minister Trygve Lie presented the final report to the Norwegian Parliament in 1964, the total financial contribution from Nortraship to Norwegian society during and after the war was shown to be 1,219,000,000 kroner.

During the Cold War, the Nortraship name was used for the organisation that would run the Norwegian fleet should there be a war. When the Cold War ended in 1991, the organisation was dissolved.

The Nortraship name again came into use after the 9/11 attacks, as the Norwegian Shipowners Association established a contingency committee on 1 January 2002. It has seven members, six civilians from various parts of the Norwegian maritime industry and one representative of the department of defence.

== In popular culture ==
In 2022 the Norwegian film War Sailor directed by Gunnar Vikene, described the traumatic events of the sailors, and their families, who participated in the Norwegian convoys during World War II.

== Staff, London, New York and outstations ==
=== Nortraship London, on 1 January 1944 ===
- Management: Ingolf Hysing Olsen, L. Brodahl, W. Dahl-Hansen, O. I. Loennechen, Erling Mossige

=== Nortraship New York, on 15 June 1943 ===
- Management: Ø. Lorentzen, E. D. Næss, P. Simonsen, C. Blom, O. Gogstad

=== Nortraship outstations ===
Each station was governed by either London (L), or New York (NY)

==== UK (L) ====
- Avonmouth
- Bangor, Northern Ireland
- Cardiff, Wales
- Glasgow, Scotland
- Greenock, Scotland
- Hull, England
- Leith, Scotland
- Liverpool, England
- Loch Ewe, Scotland
- Manchester, England
- Newcastle, England
- Swansea, Wales

==== North, Central and South America (NY) ====
- Baltimore, United States
- Boston, United States
- Halifax, Nova Scotia, Canada
- Mobile, United States
- Montreal, Canada
- New Orleans, United States
- Norfolk, United States
- Philadelphia, United States
- Port of Spain, Trinidad
- Buenos Aires, Argentina
- Santos, Brazil, (NY)
- San Francisco, United States
- San Pedro, United States
- Saint John, New Brunswick, Canada
- St. John's, Newfoundland
- Sydney, Nova Scotia, Canada
- Vancouver, British Columbia, Canada
- Willemstad, Curaçao

==== Europe (L) ====
- Gibraltar
- Göteborg, Sweden
- Lisbon, Portugal
- Naples, Italy
- Reykjavik, Iceland

==== Africa (L) ====
- Cape Town, South Africa
- Casablanca, Morocco
- Durban, South Africa
- Maputo, Mozambique
- Port Said, Egypt
- Suez, Egypt

==== India (L) ====
- Bombay (Mumbai), India
- Calcutta (Kolkata), India
- Colombo, Sri Lanka

==== Australasia (L) ====
- Adelaide, Australia
- Brisbane, Australia
- Fremantle, Australia
- Melbourne, Australia
- Port Adelaide, Australia
- Sydney, Australia
- Wellington, New Zealand

== See also ==
- Battle of the Atlantic
- Timeline of the Battle of the Atlantic
- Arctic Convoys of World War II
