= Bjarne Lindstrøm =

Norwegian diplomat (born 1942)

Bjarne Lindstrøm (born 3 June 1942) is a Norwegian diplomat.

He started working for the Norwegian Ministry of Foreign Affairs in 1962. He was the consul-general in Cape Town, South Africa from 1986 to 1990, deputy under-secretary of state in the Ministry of Foreign Affairs from 1994 to 1996, permanent under-secretary of state in the Ministry of Foreign Affairs from 1996 to 2005, and Norwegian ambassador to the United Kingdom from 2005 to 2010.

Civic offices
Preceded by Kjell Colding	Permanent under-secretary of state in the Norwegian Ministry of Foreign Affairs; 1996–2005	Succeeded by Sven-Erik Svedman
Diplomatic posts
Preceded by Tarald O. Brautaset	Norwegian Ambassador to the United Kingdom; 2005–2010	Succeeded by Kim Traavik
