= Einar M. Bull =

Norwegian diplomat (born 1942)

Einar Marensius Bull (born 20 September 1942) is a Norwegian diplomat.

He was born in Alta, and is a siv.øk. by education. After a period as secretary general of the European Movement in Norway from 1968 to 1970, he started working for the Norwegian Ministry of Foreign Affairs in 1972. He served at the Norwegian ambassador to Nigeria from 1985 to 1988, to the European Union from 1996 to 2001 and to Italy from 2006. From 2002 to 2006 he was the president of the European Free Trade Association Surveillance Authority.

Preceded by Hannes Hafstein	President of the European Free Trade Association Surveillance Authority; 2002–2006	Succeeded by Bjørn T. Grydeland
