= Bente Angell-Hansen =

Norwegian diplomat

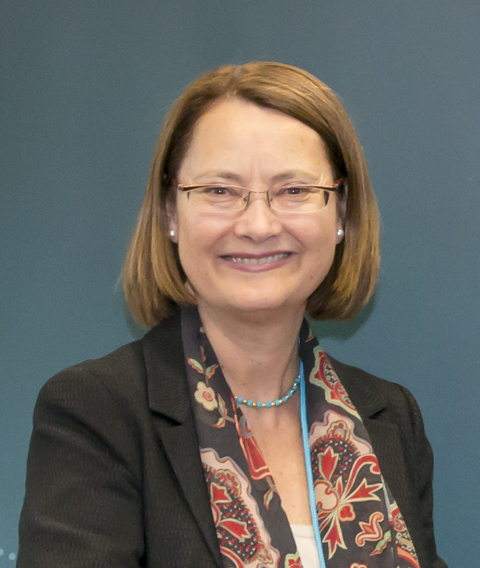
- Born: 15 December 1951 (age 74)
- Occupation: President of the EFTA Surveillance Authority (ESA)

Bente Angell-Hansen (born 15 December 1951) is a Norwegian former diplomat who served as President of the EFTA Surveillance Authority (ESA). She served as Secretary-General of the Norwegian Ministry of Foreign Affairs from 2011 to 2014. Before going to the EFTA Surveillance Authority, she was Norway's Ambassador to Austria and Head of the Norwegian Mission to the United Nations in Vienna.

== Early life and education ==
Angell-Hansen holds a cand.polit. degree in political science.

== Career ==
Angell-Hansen started working for the Norwegian Ministry of Foreign Affairs in 1982. She was a deputy under-secretary of state in the Norwegian Office of the Prime Minister from 2000 to 2005, served as the Norwegian ambassador to Hungary from 2005 to 2007, and to the United Nations in Geneva from 2008.

Since 2022, Angell-Hansen has been co-chairing – alongside Joy Phumaphi – the joint World Bank/WHO Global Preparedness Monitoring Board (GPMB).

== Honors and recognition ==
In 2011, Angell-Hansen was appointed the first female Secretary General of the Norwegian Ministry of Foreign Affairs. In 2012, the magazine Stat & Styring named her as the sixth most powerful civil servant of the Norwegian state and the magazine Kapital named her as Norway's tenth most powerful woman.

Civic offices
Preceded by Bjørn T. Grydeland	Secretary General of the Norwegian Ministry of Foreign Affairs; 2011–2014	Succeeded by Wegger Christian Strømmen
