= Bjørn Skogmo =

Norwegian diplomat

Bjørn Skogmo (born 12 December 1940) is a Norwegian diplomat.

He was born in Namsos, and is a cand.polit. by education. He started working for the Norwegian Ministry of Foreign Affairs in 1969. He served as the Norwegian ambassador to the United Nations in Geneva from 1994 to 2002, assisting permanent under-secretary of state in the Ministry of Foreign Affairs from 2002 to 2005 and Norwegian ambassador to France from 2005 to 2009.

Diplomatic posts
Preceded by Sven-Erik Svedman	Norwegian ambassador to France; 2005–2009	Succeeded by Tarald Brautaset
