= Hilmar Reksten =

Norwegian businessman (1897–1980)

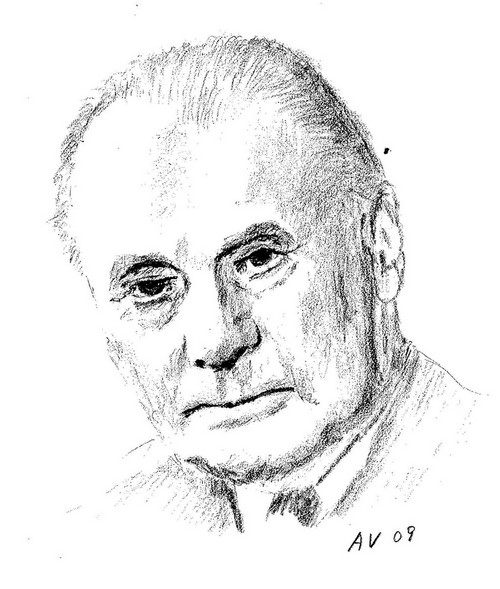
- Born: 29 October 1897; Bergen, Norway
- Died: 1 July 1980 (aged 82); Bergen, Norway
- Occupations: Shipping magnate, Philanthropist
- Spouse: Bjørg Elisabeth Reksten (1925-1939) Carol Montgomery Reksten (1952-1980)

Hilmar August Reksten (29 October 1897 – 1 July 1980) was a Norwegian shipping magnate. In the autumn of 1973 he was counted among the world's richest men, possessing a fleet worth about £300 million. At his death in 1980, all was lost; he left behind a debt of about £100 million.

== Background ==
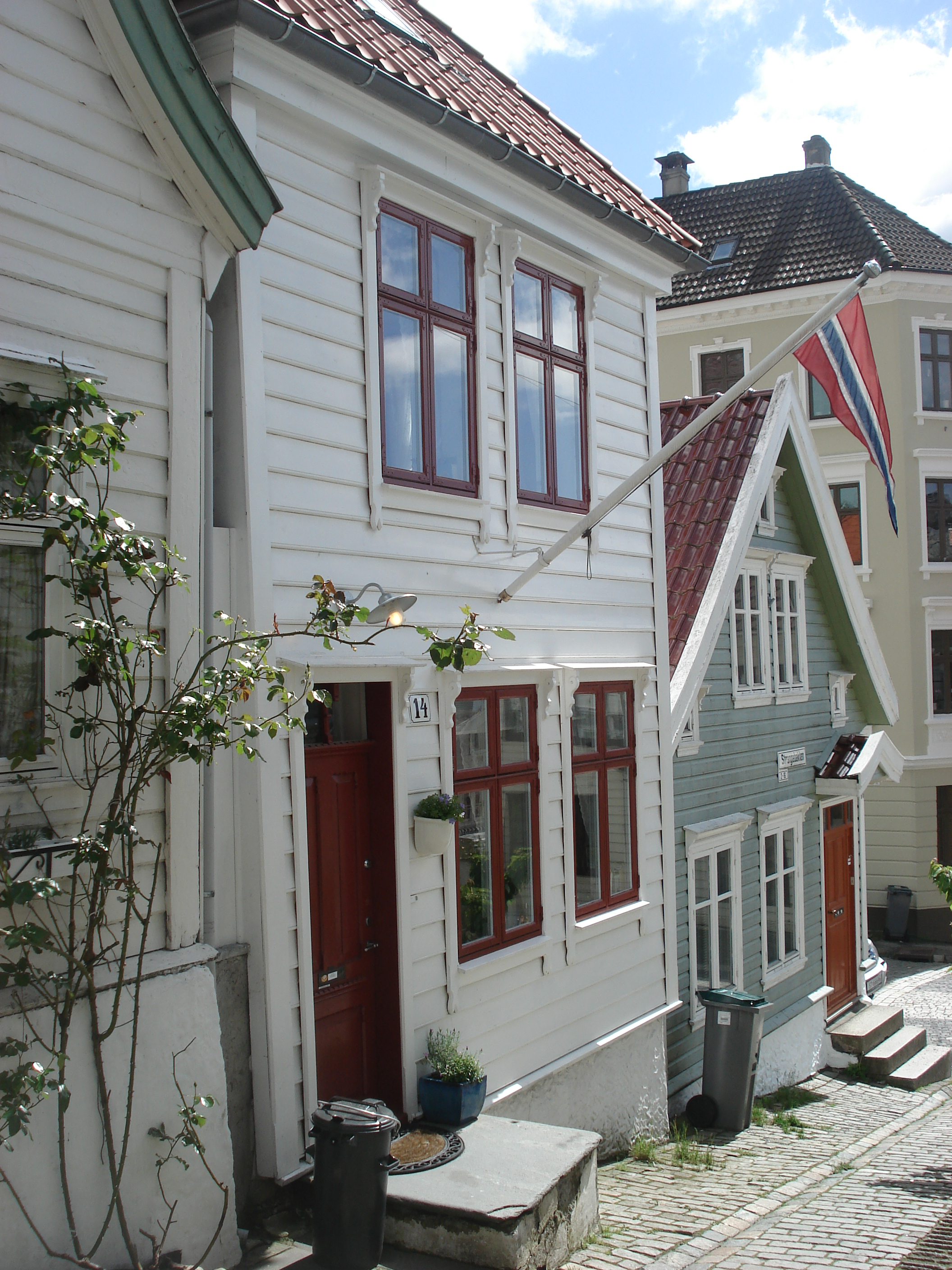
Hilmar Reksten grew up in Tyskesmauet (= German lane) no:14 (now named Strangebakken) in the Nordnes quarter. The Reksten family lived upstairs.

Hilmar Reksten grew up in a small flat at Nordnes, a central quarter of Bergen. He was the eldest of three siblings; there was a younger brother called Hjalmar (1900–1961), and a sister, Sofie. Their mother, Helene Monsen Søndervåg (1869–1902), died when Reksten was only four years old. His father, Erik Reksten (1873–1963), was a stoker and later engineer, spending most of his time out to sea. He sent home money for the children's support. It was not until 1907 that Reksten senior had saved up enough money to stay more at home with his motherless children. The same year he married Hanna Gregoriussen, whom Reksten later began calling "mother", and who created a good home for her stepchildren. She gave birth to a son, Karl (1909–1999).

Reksten did well at school, and in his free time joined the local buekorps, Nordnæs Bataillon. He had his heart set on a career in shipping, but World War I caused difficult times in that field. In 1917 he started doing unpaid volunteer work for a new shipping firm. Reksten's talent was soon recognized, and he was given a paid job; but his employer went bankrupt in 1919, caused by the recession in shipping following World War I.

== Early years in shipping ==
Reksten studied economy in Cologne helped by 5,000 NOK granted as a scholarship from Hans Westfal-Larsen's shipping company. At the end of 1921, however, the remaining sum was practically worthless, due to the hyperinflation in the Weimar Republic. Still, Reksten eked out an existence during the following three years, writing paid letters from Germany that were published in Bergens Tidende, and thus finishing his studies, returning to Norway in 1924. He had lived in Trajanstrasse in Cologne's old quarter, which roused his lifelong interest in Ancient Rome. When he started his own company in 1929, he named it Trajan after the Roman emperor. His first ship, Doris, was also renamed Trajan. His father, who had been unemployed for over a year, became the ship's first engineer. Reksten ran his firm from Minde, a residential part of Bergen, residing there until 1932. In August 1939 his wife Bjørg Elisabeth Johannessen died, only 36 years old, and after only 14 years of marriage. At that time the family resided in a villa outside of Bergen, with space also for Bjørg Elisabeth's father, while a separate building housed the shipping firm.

== Wartime ==
Reksten showed a remarkable capacity for investments; by the time of World War II the widower had six ships in operation. At the German invasion of Norway, he was drafted for military service at the naval centre of Marineholmen in Bergen. In the morning of 9 April 1940 he returned there, dressed in civilian clothes, got past the German guards there and smuggled the Norwegian commander out, along with important, secret papers. In the following days he conspired further, building up a network called "the Reksten circle" of people from the resistance movement. Gradually fearing for his life, but also because he wanted to continue his work within shipping, he chose to leave his five children behind while he himself fled to England. He went on to New York City with the intention of building up Nortraship in the United States. Five of his ships were abroad and could help the Allied with the war effort. However one of them, Hadrian, was stuck in Dakar and later in German service, until sunk by the Soviet Union outside Sevastopol in May 1944.

Reksten ended in conflict with more of Nortraship's leaders. In the autumn of 1940 he transferred his ship Octavian to a company registered in Panama and run by himself, thus breaking the rule that all Norwegian ships be controlled by Nortraship, albeit he claimed to have obtained a dispensation from Norwegian authorities. He was not fired, but transferred to the accounts department. In September 1941 he returned to London, where he cooperated closely with prime minister in exile, Johan Nygaardsvold, foreign minister Trygve Lie and other government members. He negotiated with the British Ministry of War Transport about Norwegian interests and transfer of British tonnage as replacement for Norwegian loss of ships. There were protests against him interfering with Nortraship's interests, and in February 1942 he was returned to New York to evaluate Nortraship and its leaders there. Reksten was particularly critical to the Head of Nortraship Øivind Lorentzen, and felt himself to be more competent at running Nortraship. Instead he was employed at the Nortraship office in Montreal, negotiating with American authorities about renewals of the Norwegian fleet, repairs and indemnity.

Since 1941 he had been Head of the London-based board of Store Norske Spitsbergen Kulkompani. He left for Svalbard in June 1943 on behalf of the company and as a representative of the army, where he was an officer. On Svalbard Reksten, being fluent in German, was permitted to join an expedition meant to conquer a cottage functioning as a German weather station. The expedition succeeded, as the five Germans stationed there had fled in advance; but while Reksten was on guard outside the cottage, a German submarine surfaced in the bay, opening fire at the Norwegians. Reksten was unhurt though and returned to England.

Crossing the Atlantic Ocean a number of times during World War II, Reksten was well aware of the pressure faced by the Norwegian sailors. He made sure that their families in Norway received the sailors' pay throughout the war. His concern for their welfare was genuine. Three of his four ships in Allied traffic were sunk during World War II, and in August 1943 he applied for indemnity paid in advance. He received £70 000, and invested in a British steam ship, Marsden. The Brits accepted this, provided Marsden sailed under British flag.

== Postwar ==
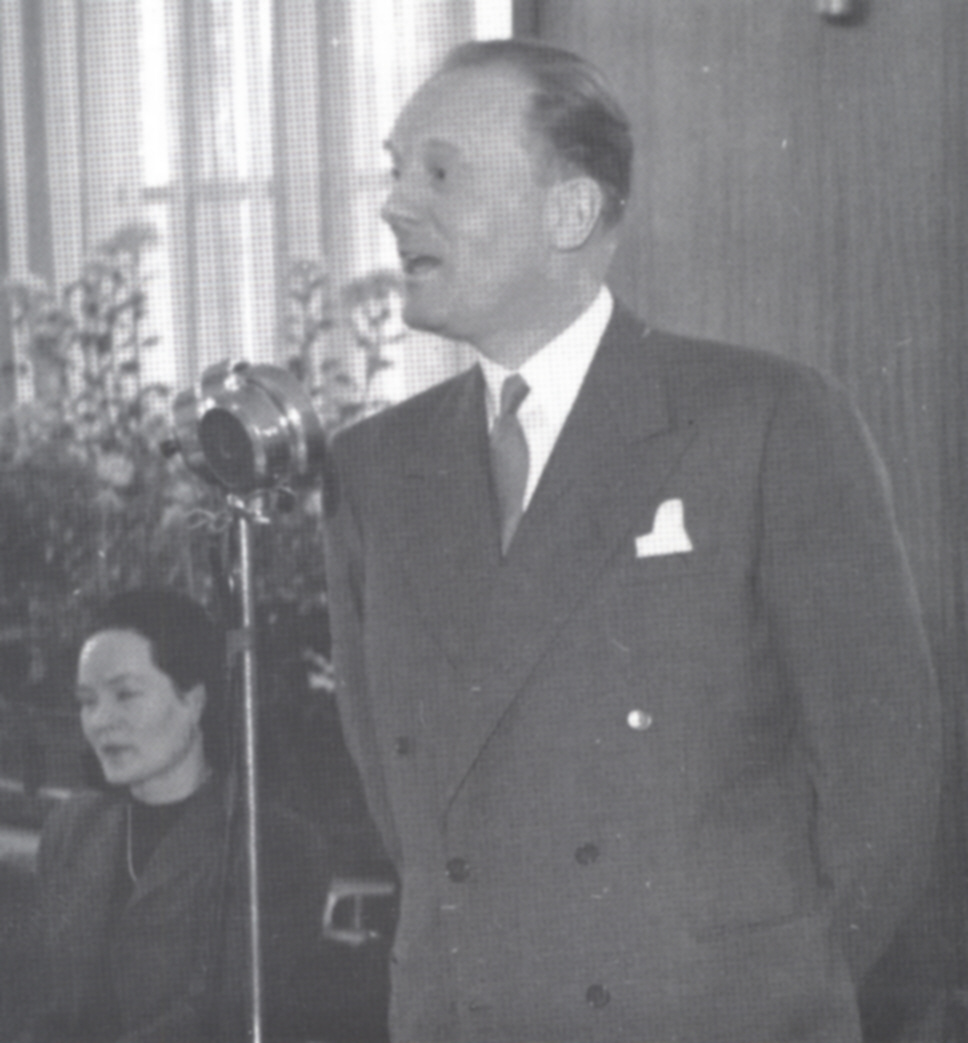
Hilmar Reksten in 1949.

After the war he kept expanding his business, and in 1974 the company had ships carrying 2 million tonnes deadweight (DWT). At this point Reksten’s was the third largest shipping company in Norway - second only to Bergesen and Jahre - and thereby also one of the largest in the world. Reksten's business principle was simple: He refused long-term contracts, presuming that at intervals, political crises would cause an increase in freight rates. For a long period he was proved right. Both when the Korean War broke out in 1950 and the Suez Crisis in 1956, Reksten profited. The fact that he, between each crisis, was on the verge of bankruptcy, did not in the least alter his conviction. His "Norwegian period" began in 1963 when he placed an order of seven large tank ships, worth 450 million kroner, with Akers mekaniske verksted (= Aker's mechanical workshop), 80% financed by his bank. It was even uncertain if the ships would find commissions when built. "But I did not have to show a bank guarantee," he boasted. "Because I refused to do so." He stood ready with 14 super tankers when the Suez Canal was closed in 1967. In 1968 Reksten placed an order for yet another seven supertankers from Aker, the largest ships the world had seen so far. He contacted other Norwegian shipping magnates, suggesting that they merge into one giant shipping firm. The others withdrew from the plan though, realizing that Reksten intended to dominate the colossus.

In 1970 Reksten signed the shipping contract of all times, when Libya cut down on oil production, while Nigeria was in chaos, and Syria closed the oil pipeline from the Middle East to the Mediterranean. Twelve of his supertankers were now hired out to BP Shipping under a contract providing Reksten with a net profit of 500 million kroner. The later "Reksten-case" originated in this giant sum, which was illegally transferred from Norway and hidden in secret "mailbox companies" abroad. To him, the profit was his, and his alone, and privately he had also ventilated the opinion that the tax policy of the Norwegian Labour party made it necessary to remove funds from Norway. Due to this action however, the Reksten empire had few funds to rely on when the freight rates dropped dramatically from 1971 onwards. The market was so slow that five of Reksten's supertankers were laid up, while he was forced to sell out another two. He still had considerable orders placed at Akers mekaniske. This firm was worried to such a degree that it was suggested to declare Reksten bankrupt; but in the winter of 1972/73, freight rates went up again, helped by an increase in the import to USA, as well as fear of rising oil prices.

== Bankruptcy ==
Reksten's declared goal was to become the world's greatest shipping magnate before turning 80, which would happen in 1977. This agenda seems to have reduced his sound judgment to a level where he bought the fleet of Zapata, formerly of shipowner Erling Dekke Næss, in the spring of 1973 for $208 million - 750 million kroner. Rather a triumph for Reksten, Næss being the one who had him removed from Nortraship for irregularities back during World War II. The purchase however was paid for by the profit Reksten had illegally removed from Norway, resulting in him being forced to deny that he was the actual owner. His actions later in 1973 reflect an almost maniacal streak, when he placed an order with Akers mekaniske of seven ships worth 2.3 billion kroner, and started imagining tank ships of one million tons. In the autumn of 1973 he controlled the largest fortune ever owned by a Norwegian. The press celebrated him as one of the world's most successful investors; but in most of Norwegian economic life he and his methods were generally disliked. Even Akers mekaniske that had delivered most of his fleet, frowned upon him. He had fallen out with the five children from his first marriage with Bjørg Elisabeth. From 1952 until his death he was married to Carol Montgomery, with whom he had one child, Grace Reksten, his sole heir.

The same year his empire started crumbling. Reksten was hit hard by the 1973 oil crisis. The main problem was that many other tank magnates had begun to share his optimism, expecting a further increase in freight rates. He was forced to cancel his billion contract with Aker, resulting in a fine of 320 million kroner. He barely avoided bankruptcy in 1976, by fetching in 100 million kroner from abroad, and have the Norwegian state guarantee for a loan of almost one billion kroner in return for taking over a great portion of the company’s stocks.

In 1979 he was tried in Bergen courthouse for tax fraud, but acquitted on all eight points except one. Reksten was at the time badly marked by his cancer. The following year he died of his disease, was declared bankrupt post mortem, while the bankruptcy proceedings went on until 1993. After his death it was easier to trace the hidden fortune abroad. The accountancy firm Ernst & Young estimated the size of this fortune to around 213 million kroner. A compromise in 1990 with sole heiress Grace Reksten Skaugen put an end to the hunt for the hidden means: 60 million kroner were transferred, along with a health centre on Lanzarote with an estimated value of 10-12 million kroner. Though, a relatively small amount of his money was put into a trust account, for his grandchildren, in 1973. This was the result of a lawsuit between Hilmar and his daughter, Astrid. Years later allegations were made that Astrid herself was complicit with her husband, in an embezzlement scheme wherein the children never received any of the benefits from that trust income or its account and the living children were left with pennies on the dollar when they finally gained control of the funds.

== The Reksten Case ==
In 2014 Bergens Tidende said that "No other case in Norway can be compared to the Reksten Case, says journalist and author Erling Borgen. He labels Reksten a tax cheat of international dimensions. – Paradoxically enough, Reksten was 'the people's ship owner', while he hoodwinked the people of Norway".

Among the general population of Bergen, he was well-liked. In 2014 Bergens Tidende said that "When the Dagsrevyen reporter published a book about the Reksten Case, then 'Bergen [going] to war against Erling Borgen', wrote VG on the front page November 7, 1981".

== Charity ==
The lord mayor in Bergen, Nils Handal, asked in 1951 Reksten to help establish Festspillene i Bergen, which were held for the first time in 1953. Reksten contributed financially and was also head of its board for five years. He donated considerable sums to the erection of the museum that now houses Rolf Stenersen's art collection in Bergen, as well as spending around 7.5 million kroner to purchase grounds and houses around the planned concert hall, Grieghallen, so that the construction works got started.

In 1967, when the school ship Statsraad Lehmkuhl risked being sold out of the country, Reksten bought the ship and made sure that it remained in Bergen. He supported the Norwegian institute in Rome financially. In 1971 he established a charity fund. Naturally, there was little activity after his bankruptcy; but into the 1990s things started improving, and today Rekstensamlingene (the Reksten collections) are part of Bergen's cultural scene.

== Marriage and children ==
Hilmar Reksten married firstly 1925 Bjørg Elisabeth Reksten (1903-1939) and had five children:

- Tore Reksten (1930–1957).
- Rolf Reksten (1932–1999).
- Astrid Reksten (1935–2020).
- Audun Reksten (1936–2007).
- Bjørg Nora Reksten (1939–2006).

He married secondly 1952 Carol Mowinckel, née Montgomery (1922-1990), widow of shipping magnate Jens Gran Mowinckel (1918–1950), and had one daughter. In 1965 he also adopted her two children from her first marriage:

- Christine Mowinckel Reksten (1945–1993).
- Johan Ludwig Mowinckel Reksten (born 1948).
- Grace Montgomery Reksten Skaugen (born 1953). She is married to Morits Skaugen, Jr.

Reksten's daughter Astrid Reksten moved to the United States after marrying another Norwegian man Sigurd Hoyer. The couple had five children and eventually divorced in 1987. Astrid died in 2020. Sadly two of her own sons also died, both at very young ages. On June 3, 2022 the Norwegian Newspaper AftenPosten ran a long feature article in their weekend magazine, "A-Magasinet" based on three days' worth of interviews with Astrid and Sigurd's youngest child, Richard. The article reveals that Hilmar Reksten had left his grandchildren a large sum of money in a trust in 1973, and that Astrid and Sigurd secretly broke into the trust and stole nearly all of the money it contained. Following the article's publication Richard Hoyer wrote two Kindle books about the family history. The first was title The Poisoned Well and was his first hand account of discovering the full story behind the theft of the trust left to him and his siblings, while the second was titled The Enlightened Self Interest of Hilmar Reksten and was the first English language biography of Hilmar Reksten ever written.

Hilmar Reksten''s great grandson Maddox Reksten, grandson of Astrid Reksten plays for American rock band Sarah and the Safe Word.

== Film and books about Hilmar Reksten ==
The Enlightened Self Interest of Hilmar Reksten By Richard Hoyer (Hilmar Reksten's grandson) was published on Kindle in 2023. It was the first English language biography of Hilmar Reksten.

The Poisoned Well By Richard Hoyer (Hilmar Reksten's grandson) was published on Kindle in 2023. It is the full story of Hoyer's discovery that his parents had stolen the trust fund left to him and his siblings by Hilmar Reksten.

Hilmar Reksten’s Dagbok 1940-1945: “Hilmar Reksten’s Diary 1940-1945.” This Norwegian-language volume is Hilmar’s own diary detailing his resistance activities for Norway. It was published by H. Aschehoug & Co in 1980.

Penger i Paradis: “Money in Paradise” was written in Norwegian by Trond Gram and was published in 2017. This book details the government bailout of Reksten, his criminal prosecution, and the creditors’ global 20-year hunt for his hidden billion-dollar fortune.

Slik Var Det: “This is How It Was” was written in Norwegian by Auden Reksten, the author’s uncle, who helped run Reksten Shipping for many years. It was published by Gyldendal Norsk Forlag in 1983.

Hilmar Rekstens Eventyr: “Hilmar Reksten’s Adventure” was written in Norwegian by Erling Borgen, who was one of the reporters covering Reksten’s criminal trial in 1979. This book details Hilmar’s huge financial scandal and the resulting criminal trial. It was published by J.W. Cappelens Forlag in 1981.

Reksten was written in Norwegian by Kristian Ilner. It is a complete biography of Reksten’s life and was published by Vigmostad & Bjorke in 2006.

In 2014 Keiseren ["the emperor"]—a documentary directed by Lars Skorpen—was released.

A TV documentary on Reksten's life is being produced (2012), based on material from the files of photographer Lene Løtvedt.
