= Tarald Brautaset =

Norwegian diplomat

Tarald Osnes Brautaset (born 28 September 1946) is a Norwegian diplomat.

He is a cand.polit. by education, and started working for the Norwegian Ministry of Foreign Affairs in 1973. He was a member of the Norwegian delegation to the European Union from 1988 to 1994, during the negotiations for Norwegian membership in the Union (which were stopped after the 1994 Norwegian European Union membership referendum) and then the European Economic Area. He then served as head of department in the Ministry of Foreign Affairs until 1997, and as an advisor from 1997 to 2000 and 2005 to 2008. He was the Norwegian ambassador to the United Kingdom from 2000 to 2005 and later the ambassador to France from 2009 to 2014.

Tarald Brautaset was appointed Commander of the Royal Norwegian Order of St. Olav in 2000.

Brautaset lost the position in the United Kingdom after Bjarne Lindstrøm was removed from his office in the Norwegian Ministry of Foreign Affairs and installed in London instead.

Diplomatic posts
Preceded by Kjell Colding	Norwegian Ambassador to the United Kingdom; 2000–2005	Succeeded by Bjarne Lindstrøm
Preceded by Bjørn Skogmo	Norwegian ambassador to France; 2009–2014	Succeeded by Rolf Einar Fife
