= WHO Global Preparedness Monitoring Board =

The Global Preparedness Monitoring Board (abbreviated GPMB) is a joint arm of the WHO and the World Bank. It was created by both organizations in response to the Western African Ebola virus epidemic.

== Synopsis ==
The GPMB are concerned that "at any time, an emerging, lethal, and highly transmissible pathogen might pose a risk of being spread globally because of the interconnectedness of the global population."

== Board members ==
In June 2023, the GPMB listed its board members as:

- Kolinda Grabar-Kitarović, co-chair
- Joy Phumaphi, co-chair
- Palitha Abeykoon
- Ibrahim Abubakar
- Bente Angell-Hansen
- Maha El Rabbat
- Victor Dzau
- Chris Elias
- Zijian Feng
- Henrietta Fore
- Bience Gawanas
- Jayati Ghosh
- Naoko Ishii
- Ilona Kickbusch
- Mark Lowcock
- Susana Malcorra
- Matthew Stone

In December 2020, board members were:

- Elhadj As Sy, co-chair
- Gro Harlem Brundtland, co-chair
- Victor Dzau
- Chris Elias
- Jeremy Farrar
- Anthony S. Fauci
- Henrietta Fore
- George F. Gao
- Sigrid Kaag
- Ilona Kickbusch
- Ngamije M. Daniel
- Veronika Skvortsova
- Yasuhiro Suzuki
- Jeanette Vega Morales
- K. VijayRaghavan

== Commentary ==
In April 2020, Boyd, Baker and Wilson remarked that the "WHO Global Preparedness Monitoring Board Report 2019 repeatedly notes widespread lack of preparedness for a significant pandemic".

== Selected publications ==
- Global Preparedness Monitoring Board (September 2020). A World in Disorder. Global Preparedness Monitoring Board Annual Report 2020 (PDF). Geneva: World Health Organization. Archived from the original (PDF) on September 14, 2020.
- Global Preparedness Monitoring Board (September 2019). A World at Risk: Annual Report on Global Preparedness for Health Emergencies (PDF). Geneva: World Health Organization. Archived from the original (PDF) on September 18, 2019.
