= Johannes Irgens =

Norwegian barrister, diplomat and politician (1869–1939)

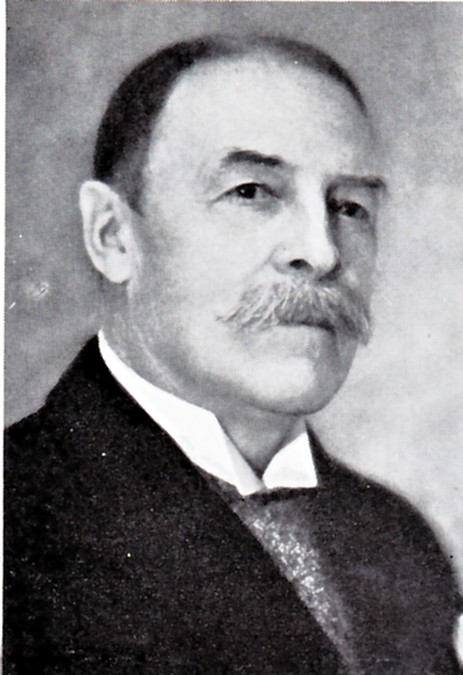

Minister of Foreign Affairs
- In office 2 February 1910 – 31 January 1913
- Prime Minister: Wollert Konow; Jens Bratlie
- Preceded by: Wilhelm Christophersen
- Succeeded by: Nils Claus Ihlen

Personal details
- Born: 31 July 1869 Ås, Akershus, United Kingdoms of Sweden and Norway
- Died: 29 December 1939 (aged 70) Oslo, Norway
- Spouse: Lilla Minda Marie Gulbranson
- Children: Henrik Joachim Irgens; Carl Marcus Francis Irgens
- Parent(s): Marcus Fredrik Irgens (1839–76) and Julie Martine Nicoline Dyrgreen (1840–1906)
- Education: University of Oslo
- Occupation: Diplomat and foreign minister

Johannes Irgens (31 July 1869 – 29 December 1939) was a Norwegian barrister, diplomat and politician, noted for his service as minister of foreign affairs of Norway from 1910 to 1913.

== Personal life ==
Irgens was born into the merchant and civil service family of Irgens, as a son of Marcus Fredrik Irgens (1839–1876) and Julie Martine Nicoline Dyrgreen (1840–1906). In November 1892 he married Lilla Minda Marie Gulbranson (1872–1938), a daughter of Carl August Gulbranson (1831–1910) and Minda Ramm Juell (1844–1913). Through this marriage, Irgens was a brother-in-law of Carl Gulbranson.

His father was docent at the Norwegian College of Agriculture, but died when Irgens was seven years old. Irgens moved with his mother to Kristiania, and he took the examen artium at Oslo Cathedral School in 1887. He graduated with a cand.jur. degree in law in 1892 at the Royal Frederick University. During his time as a student, he served as member and chair of the board for Norwegian Students' Society, editor of its newsletter, and was briefly at University of Oxford.

== Foreign service career ==
Irgens joined the Norwegian-Swedish diplomatic corps upon graduating from university in 1892, his initial posting as a diplomatic fellow in Bordeaux and then Antwerp. His fellowship was revoked in 1895 as a result of tension between Sweden and Norway about the use of consuls. He returned to Kristiania and took up work as an attorney. He advanced to barrister, earning the right to appear before the Supreme Court, in 1900.

He also served on an elect commission charged with exploring ways for Norway and Sweden to maintain separate consular offices while maintaining a common foreign policy. When the union was dissolved in 1905, Irgens immediately offered his services to the Norwegian government.

He was sent to Washington, DC in an effort to convince the Theodore Roosevelt administration to recognize Norway. Once this was accomplished, he was named Chargé d'affaires under Fridtjof Nansen at Norway's embassy in London, a highly visible posting. In 1908 he succeeded Nansen as ambassador, and in 1910 he returned to Norway to assume the post of Minister of Foreign Affairs in the Wollert Konow's cabinet as part of the Conservative Party. When the cabinet resigned, Irgens continued as Minister of Foreign Affairs in Jens Bratlie's cabinet. Among other distinctions, King Haakon VII named him special envoy for the coronation of George V of the United Kingdom.

When Bratlie's Cabinet did not survive the 1913 election, Irgens accept a post as acting County Governor of Hedmark but asked to be put back into active service as a diplomat. He was made ambassador in Copenhagen in 1913, with accreditation also to The Hague and Brussels. In 1922 he was made ambassador in Rome, Italy with responsibility also for Norway's station in Bern, with accreditation also to Athens from 1927 to 1935 and Bucharest from 1930 to 1931.

He was decorated as a Knight First Class of the Order of St. Olav (1906), upgraded to Commander with Star in 1909. He also received the Grand Cross of the Order of the Dannebrog, Grand Cordon of the Order of Leopold, Grand Cross of the Royal Victoria Order and the Grand Cordon of the Order of the Rising Sun (Japan).

Political offices
Preceded by Wilhelm Christopher Christophersen	Norwegian Minister of Foreign Affairs; 1910–1913	Succeeded by Nils Claus Ihlen
Preceded by Gregers Winther Wulfsberg Gram	County Governor of Hedmark; 1915–1916 (acting)	Succeeded by Torvald Løchen
Diplomatic posts
Preceded by Fridtjof Nansen	Norwegian Minister to the United Kingdom; 1908–1910	Succeeded by Benjamin Vogt
