= Kjell Colding =

Norwegian diplomat and politician

Secretary General of the Norwegian Ministry of Foreign Affairs
- In office 1992–1996
- Preceded by: Vibecke Lous
- Succeeded by: Bjarne Lindstrøm

Norwegian Ambassador to the United Kingdom
- In office 1996–2000
- Preceded by: Tom Vraalsen
- Succeeded by: Tarald Brautaset

Norwegian Ambassador to the United States
- In office 1988–1992
- Preceded by: Kjell Eliassen
- Succeeded by: Kjeld Vibe

Personal details
- Born: January 26, 1931 Oslo, Norway
- Died: July 28, 2009 (aged 78) Oslo, Norway
- Education: University of Oslo (Cand.jur.)
- Occupation: Diplomat
- Known for: Chair of the 1985 Zone Committee on the Nordic Nuclear-Weapon-Free Zone

Kjell Colding (20 March 1931 – 28 July 2009) was a Norwegian diplomat and politician for the Conservative Party.

He was born in Oslo, and took the cand.jur. degree in his education. He started working for the Norwegian Ministry of Foreign Affairs in 1958, and was promoted to assistant secretary in 1967. At the same time he had a political career in the same ministry; as private secretary (now known as political adviser) from 1966 to 1970 and State Secretary from 1970 to 1971, both in Borten's Cabinet.

Back in the ministry as a civil servant, he served as embassy counsellor in Sweden from 1971 to 1975, sub-director in the Ministry of Foreign Affairs from 1975 to 1977, ambassador from 1977 to 1979 and deputy under-secretary of state in the Ministry of Foreign Affairs from 1979 to 1981. He was then a State Secretary in the Office of the Prime Minister from 1981 to 1984 and the Norwegian ambassador to Finland from 1985 to 1989.

He was then a deputy under-secretary of state again from 1989 to 1991, special adviser from 1991 to 1992 and permanent under-secretary of state from 1992 to 1996. He finished his career as the Norwegian ambassador to the United Kingdom from 1996 to 2000.

Civic offices
Preceded by Helge Vindenes	Permanent under-secretary of state in the Norwegian Ministry of Foreign Affairs; 1992–1996	Succeeded by Bjarne Lindstrøm
Diplomatic posts
Preceded by Tom Vraalsen	Norwegian Ambassador to the United Kingdom; 1996–2000	Succeeded by Tarald Brautaset
