= Fredrik C. Blom =

Norwegian businessman (1893–1970)

Fredrik Christopher Blom (14 July 1893 – 5 September 1970) was a Norwegian businessperson.

== Personal life ==
He was born in Kristiania as a son of Andreas Ebeltoft Blom (1853–1901) and Birgitte Bull Lied. In 1917 he married Alethe Heyerdahl Vogt, a daughter of ambassador and politician Paul Benjamin Vogt (1863–1947) and Daisy Heyerdahl (1864–1946). They had the son Chr. Fredrik Blom.

He was also a brother-in-law of Stener Vogt, Daisy Vogt (first wife of Diderich H. Lund) and Leiken Vogt (wife of Ferdinand Schjelderup and then cohabitant with Emil Stang, Jr.).

== Career ==
After finishing his secondary education in Skien in 1909 and Kristiania Commerce School in 1910, Blom worked abroad for several years. He travelled in England, Russia and France from 1910 to 1914 and in East Asia and America from 1916 to 1917. He established his own company in 1921, and in 1927 he was hired as chief executive officer of industrial company De-No-Fa. He retired in 1959 and was succeeded by his son Chr. Fredrik Blom, but continued as chair until 1965.

He also chaired Lilleborg Fabriker, was a board member of the Federation of Norwegian Industries and Brødrene Lever and was a supervisory council member of Bergens Privatbank, Forsikringsselskapet Norden and Morgenbladet. He chaired the Alliance Francaise branch in Oslo from 1935 to 1937, and was a Chevalier of the Legion of Honour. He headed the Norwegian committee in the International Chamber of Commerce and was vice president from 1948 to 1957, and chaired Norges Eksportråd from 1954 to 1966.

He was also decorated as a Commander of the Order of St. Olav (1956) and of the Order of Homayoun. He died in September 1970 while vacationing in Geilo.
