= Bjørn T. Grydeland =

Norwegian civil servant and diplomat

Bjørn Trygve Grydeland (born 30 May 1949) is a Norwegian civil servant and diplomat.

He graduated as cand.polit. from the University of Oslo in 1979. He was deputy under-secretary of State in the Office of the Prime Minister from 1988 to 1992, and secretary-general there from 1992 to 2001. From 2001 to 2005 he was the Norwegian ambassador to the European Union in Brussels. From 2006 to 2007 he was a president in the European Free Trade Association Surveillance Authority, before returning to Norway as permanent under-secretary of State of the Ministry of Foreign Affairs. From 2011 to 2017 he served as the Norwegian ambassador to Italy.

In 2008 he was proclaimed Commander with Star of the Order of St. Olav. He resides at Ballerud.

Preceded by Dag Berggrav	Secretary-general at the Norwegian Office of the Prime Minister; 1992–2001	Succeeded by Nina Frisak
Preceded by Einar M. Bull	Norwegian ambassador to the European Union; 2001–2005	Succeeded by Oda Sletnes
Preceded by Einar M. Bull	President of the European Free Trade Association Surveillance Authority; 2006–2007	Succeeded by Per Sanderud
Preceded by Sven-Erik Svedman	Permanent under-secretary of state in the Norwegian Ministry of Foreign Affairs; 2007–2011	Succeeded by Bente Angell-Hansen
Preceded by Einar M. Bull	Norwegian ambassador to Italy; 2011–2017	Succeeded by Margit Tveiten
