= Erling Dekke Næss =

Norwegian ship owner

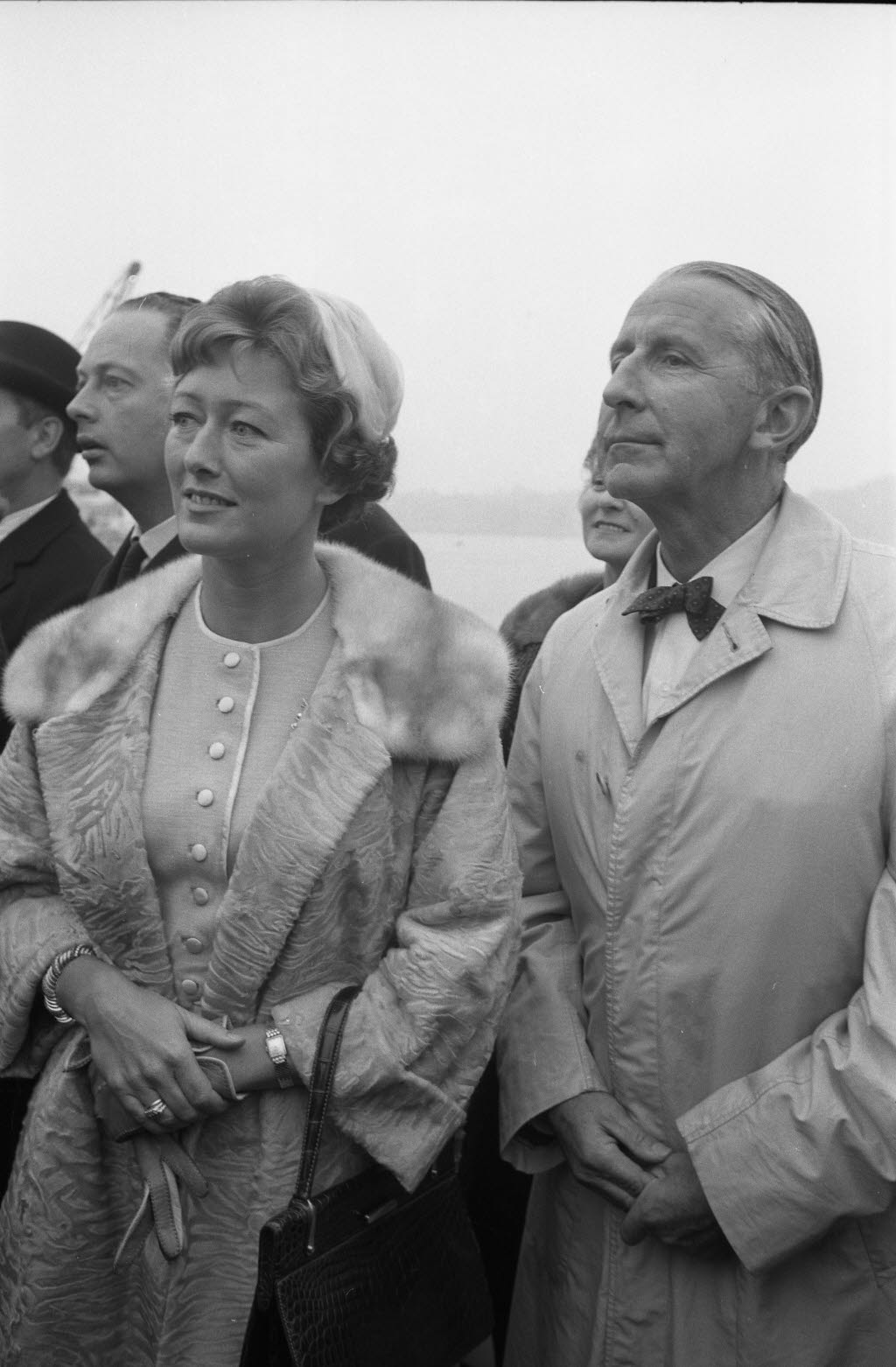
- Naess (right) and Marie Luise Westphal (left) 24 October 1962
- Born: 5 September 1901; Bergen, Norway
- Died: 7 February 1993; Bermuda
- Citizenship: Bermuda, Norway
- Education: Doctor of Philosophy, Ph.D. at the London School of Economics.
- Occupations: Shipowner and Businessman
- Father: Ragnar Næss
- Relatives: Arne Næss (brother); Arne Næss Jr. (nephew)

Erling Dekke Næss (5 September 1901 – 7 February 1993) was a Norwegian shipowner and businessman. Næss was Deputy Head of Nortraship's New York office from 1942 to 1946. Næss was the initiator behind the OBO carrier. He is also credited as the proposer of the Norwegian International Ship Register, which allowed Norwegian shipowners to compete on an equal footing with flags of convenience.

== Family and early years ==
Erling Dekke Næss was born in Bergen, Norway, and was the son of Ragnar Næss, a businessman and banker. He had two brothers, the younger being the philosopher Arne Næss. His nephew was the mountaineer and businessman Arne Næss Jr. Best known for his early adoption of flags of convenience.

The family moved to Kristiania in 1911, where his father died in 1913. Næss studied economy at the Royal Frederick University and earned a B.S. in 1920. He contemplated continued studies and travelled to Britain to finish a Ph.D. at the London School of Economics.

== Studies and work in Britain ==
Næss did not have the financial resources to study, so he had to work; after a short stint at Midland Bank, he changed over to C. J. Hambro & Son. He started out as a typist, writing letters to Scandinavian customers, but after a year, he was made assistant in the new currency department. In the evenings, he continued his studies in economics, and was greatly influenced by John Maynard Keynes.

By the middle of 1923, Næss decided to concentrate on his Ph.D. and thus ended his engagement with the bank. Special interest for his research and work were the imbalances created by the German war reparations, as their consequences could be seen in the currency market with the German mark rapidly losing value against other main currencies. The young Næss was amazed at being at the center of the disastrous decline of the mark, severely undermining the Weimar Republic.

The aim of his research was to show how fluctuations in the currency market influenced each nation's prices, and he became a member of the Royal Economic Society in order to follow lectures by Keynes and others. Keynes was a proponent of economists investing in the market, in order to "live as one learned", and young Næss followed this. He started out with small investments in rubber, as there were huge imbalances in supply and demand which he had found through his research. With the profits he continued into tin, and as he was successful he was offered a job as an analyst by his broker, so leaving him with less time for concluding his research.

== Into whaling ==
In 1927, Næss got to know Rupert Trouton, and he presented Næss with a plan to buy control of his father-in-law's whaling enterprise, the Norwegian company A/S Hektor. In establishing the Hektor Whaling Ltd, Næss developed his banking experience and contacts in City. Næss took £50,000 of the company's total capital of £600,000, a gamble that was to make him a huge profit. Due to his success in this enterprise, he was contacted by the Norwegian whaling pioneers Torger Moe and Johan Rasmussen in the summer of 1928. They asked for his help to arrange financing of their Viking Whaling Company Ltd, as they planned to build one of the world's first whale factory ship. The vessel Vikingen was to be built as a tanker, with the whale processing factory on its deck; thus being able to trade both as a factory ship and a tanker.

Næss found the prospect very interesting, arranged the financing and the first whaling company trading on the LSE started in January 1929. Næss did receive some critique from Norway for "selling out know-how" to the British, as whaling was a huge Norwegian industry. Næss' view was that the capital was difficult to obtain in Norway and that the crew and supplies would come from Norway anyway. Vikingen, with a deadweight tons of 15,000 tons was delivered in September 1929 and sailed for its first season, which was a huge success.

== Enter the Panama flag ==
However, there were problems. As Vikingen was British registered, Norwegian stockowners were taxed twice. In order to remedy this, Næss found the innovative solution of moving the administration to France and registering the vessel Vikingen in Panama, as US-owned vessels had done since 1922. Næss had to overcome a number of obstacles, one of them arranging a tax agreement between the US and Panama. In concluding this agreement Næss got assistance from Standard Oil Company of New Jersey. After much research and work a Panama company named Viking Corporation was established and the Vikingen with its whaling vessels was sold to that company in 1931. The various Norwegian sailors' organisations were informed that all wages and agreements would remain as before, and a bonus would be given covering the fact that the seamen would not receive Norwegian public pensions. This was accepted by the powerful head of the seamen's union, Mr. Ingvald Haugen.

== Depression and overproduction ==
The purpose of the Viking Whaling Company Ltd was not only to operate its own whale factory ships but to buy shares in Norwegian companies. It bought shares in A/S Vestfold, A/S Sydhavet and A/S Rosshavet, all controlled by Johan Rasmussen & Co. Besides ships these companies had a whaling station on South Shetland. For the years 1924 - 1928, profits were above 60%, with a maximum of 147% as net profit to capital. With the depression the prices collapsed, and in the beginning of the 1930s, there were a number of vessels laid up and restructuring in the business. Næss was closely involved in this, especially with the sale of the new whale factory ship Vestfold (21,800 tonnes deadweight (DWT)) to a newly established company in London, as A/S Vestfold could not service its debtors. This was made possible by Næss's good connections in London, and saved the Norwegian company from bankruptcy.

During the years 1932-34, the prices on whale oil sank from £25 to £10 per ton. To counter this the first voluntary reductions of production came forth, as governed by a quota agreement signed 9 June 1932. The agreement set limits on production of whale oil and the length of the season, it was to start 7 October 1932 and end 30 April 1933. This resulted in that the companies Næss was involved with used only the modern Vestfold for that season.

== A taste of whale hunting and shadows of war ==
In December 1934, Næss travelled to Cape Town to study the whale hunt, and reached the Vestfold in January 1935. He saw the whole process of hunting and processing the whales. He was trying his luck at shooting whales and was very much impressed by the gunners' skill. The largest whale caught was some 33 m with a weight of over 100 tonnes. Næss seemed to regret part of his involvement in the whaling business, as it ended almost exterminating the large whales. Næss was back in London in March 1935, and though the market was still down it had improved, due to large purchases of whale oil by the German government. In the season 1937 - 1938 the market was down again, and with Vestfold producing a loss it was decided to sell Vikingen.

The only buyer was the German government, and it could only pay with building a tanker. It was a huge political gamble, but the agreement was signed in Berlin early 1938 and the building of the 14,000 t DWT tanker started at Deutsche Werft in Hamburg. Næss was acutely aware of war looming and followed the building himself. The vessel named Norness and delivered on 4 May 1939. The remaining whale factory vessel in the cooperating companies was now Vestfold; it would do its last season 1939 - 1940. After delivering some of its cargo to Procter & Gamble in New York and the rest in Liverpool it would act as a bunker vessel in Freetown until 1944, when it departed and was sunk by a German submarine.

== Into the tanker trade ==
The whale factory vessels were actually tankers with the whale processing equipment added, so Næss and his partners ventured into tankers. The first small step was in 1930, with two motor tankers, Nore, a 12,478 t DWT vessel and Norvinn 10,476 t DWT, both considered large by then current standards. The vessels were to have traded in the spot market, but as the rates were low, both were laid up. Næss was not discouraged by this, and on 20 February 1936, he established the company Viking Tanker Company Limited with capital raised in London. The administration was in Paris, and the vessels were to sail under the Panama flag. It bought the two previous mentioned tankers from Rasmussen & Moe's Rederi A/S, and it ordered and bought several vessels. By 1938, the company had five vessels, Nore, Norvinn, Norvik, Norlys and Norbris, totalling 56,000 t DWT - a large tanker fleet for that period. This resulted in a net profit of £192,575 for the company's second year of operation.

== War and the escape from Norway ==
In September 1939, World War II began, and the tanker markets became very strong. Even though sailing under a neutral flag, the Viking Tanker Company vessels were able to trade as they followed British regulations. Næss travelled to Norway in April 1940, as he had been requested by the British Ministry of Trade to contact Norwegian shipowners that did not fully support the blockade of Germany. He would also meet his colleagues in Sandefjord, Johan Rasmussen and Torger Moe. Næss had a meeting on 8 April 1940, with the Norwegian Foreign Minister, Halvdan Koht and woke up the day after, 9 April, with the German invasion of Oslo, seeing the German transport planes landing at the Fornebu airport from his brother Arne Næss's house in Holmenkollen. Næss was pessimistic about Norway's chances towards the German invasion and escaped Oslo on 10 April, heading westwards by air. The journey would be by train, air, car, and small boats. He ended up in Ålesund, where he volunteered as an interpreter for the British Expeditionary Force. On the way, he was twice locked up by Norwegian police, suspecting him of being a spy. After a few weeks in Ålesund, the British forces had to withdraw, and Næss followed them back to Britain.

Back in London, Næss had to establish contact with the seven vessels operated by the group. Until the invasion, they had been controlled by the office in Sandefjord, Norway. These were the whale factory ship Vestfold (built in Framnæs shipyard), the tankers Norness, Norbris, Norlys, Norvinn, and the dry cargo vessels ,Nordal and Nortun. The British government also wanted control of his fleet, demanding to have the vessels on bare-boat charter. This was a blow to Næss, as he felt insulted by what he viewed as unfriendly treatment of a friend of Britain. Næss insisted on running the company himself, as he knew both the vessel and the crew. The British government initially did not accept this, and weeks followed where Næss was not allowed to contact his vessels or leave the country. The solution came through the banker Sam Guinness, as the companies had substantial amounts of US dollars in New York banks. This money could only be released by Næss, and the British government needed dollars. For $1,125,000, Næss got his travel permit to the US.

In August 1940, Næs arrived in New York on the White Star/Cunard liner Scythia, and he immediately proceeded to secure premises in State Street for his company office. However, the British government was still insistent on controlling the vessels, and their weapon was the bunkering permit needed for British-controlled harbours. As Næss thought he was the most capable person to control the fleet, he took his case to the United States Maritime Commission. After a 10-minute meeting with its leader, Admiral Emory S. Land, in September 1940, he was instructed that two of his vessels should be chartered to the British and five to the US. Thus, Næss was one of the few, if not the only, private shipowners allowed to continue his operations during the war. The other countries controlled their vessels' crews, while Næss with his Panama flag had to recruit his seamen on a voluntary basis. Næss established a working relationship with the United States Maritime Commission. For the accounting year ending 31 July 1940, the net profit was £150,325. For 1941, it was £155,844, and for 1942, it was £158,397.

The first vessel the company lost was Norness, which torpedoed off of Long Island in January 1942. It was the first vessel to be sunk that close to the US coast. The sinking was huge news and the press coverage was extensive, even though the whole crew was saved.

== Serving Norway ==
During the summer of 1942, Næss was called for a meeting with Johan Ludwig Mowinckel, former prime minister of Norway. He was not satisfied with how Nortraship was administered and wanted Næss to manage the organisation, as he had established connections with the United States Maritime Commission. In November 1942, Næss was given the position as Deputy Head of the Nortraship New York office. Næss he had to give up his job as head of the Viking Tanker Company and sell his shares in order not to have a conflict of interest.

Immediately after joining Nortraship, Næss was thrown into negotiating a new tonnage agreement with his British and US counterparts, Bill Weston from the Ministry of War Transport and David Scoll from the War Shipping Administration. The negotiations took months, and the agreement was signed on New Year's Eve 1942, and thus named the Hogmanay agreement. The agreement was to last for the rest of the war, and Næss played the inexperienced US negotiator against the British, thus landing as many benefits as he could for the Norwegians.

With the tonnage agreement settled, Næss focused on the bad relationship between the main Nortraship offices, London, and New York. He initiated an exchange of reports between the offices, and made a number of visits to the London office, thus gradually improving the cooperation between them. When the war ended in 1945, Næss was asked to stay on to help liquidate Nortraship and to arrange the negotiations for new vessels replacing the ones sunk during the war. Næss stayed for another year and, together with Nortraship's representative in Washington, George O. Mejlænder, a number of vessels were secured for Norwegian owners. Næss later regretted the decision to stay on as his rivals Onassis and Niarchos got a head start on him.

== Establishing the Næss group ==
In November 1946, after leaving Nortraship, Næss established the company Næss, Mejlænder & Co. Inc. in New York with a capital of $50,000. They quickly set up two companies in Panama, Nortuna Shipping Company Inc. and Norness Shipping Company Inc. Næss managed to secure financing from J. P. Morgan & Co. which became a pillar in the group's growth. Nortuna bought four old US general cargo ships, and two 11,500 t DWT liners were ordered from Mitsubishi Shipbuilding & Engineering in Tokyo, to be built by their dock in Yokohama. Næss made his first visit to Japan in 1949 when the country was still occupied by US forces, and the orders were the first from a foreigner after the war. In the years to come, Japanese shipyards were to deliver around 30 vessels to the Næss group. The vessels were named Sagura and Yama, the latter sold just after delivery as the market was bad. That was a huge mistake as the war in Korea broke out and the demand for vessels soared.

After selling the four old vessels, Næss liquidated Nortuna Shipping and concentrated on Norness Shipping. After a slow start, he started using "Contracts of Affreightment" in a 1954 agreement with American Independent Oil Company, of San Francisco. The contract stipulated that a given amount of oil was to be transported to Houston, Texas from the Persian Gulf. The form of the contract gave Næss room to arrange the best possible conditions for transporting the oil, both for him and the oil company. The terms of the contract created a small sensation, and Næss was summoned for a lunch in the Petroleum Club of Houston.

After the Korean War the market dived, but as an economist, Næss was sure the market would rise again. To realize this idea, Næss organised the "Naess Scheme Charters", where he would take other shipowners' vessels on long-term charters. The spirit behind this was pooling resources; each would do what one did best. The shipowners supplying tonnage would build, finance and manage, while Næss as the charterer would do his utmost to place the vessels. From 1954 ten vessels were chartered by Scandinavian American Shipping Company (owned 57% by Norness Shipping and 43% by the Rockefeller family) on Naess Scheme Charters, from reputed Scandinavian shipping companies, among them A. P. Møller. Næss's theory seemed to hold; although for some years the charters ran with losses, the shipping boom after 1967 ended the 15-year charters with a solid profit.

== Years of explosive growth ==
In 1956, Næss started to order vessels that he anticipated the oil companies would need in the coming years. The basis was long-term financing from banks and insurance companies in the US and other countries. He ordered four big tankers from Japanese builders; each was around 42,000 t DWT, to be delivered from September 1957 to June 1958. Within a few months all four were on long-term charter, two to Socal and two to Texaco. By April 1957, Næss had ordered 20 new buildings, to be delivered over the following five years. Except for three of the vessels, they were covered by long-time charters. Seven of the vessels were to be built by Japanese shipyards, due to their high quality and prompt delivery. George Mejlænder decided to start his own brokerage firm and Næss paid him out; the company name was changed to Næss Shipping Co. Inc. As the "battle of convenience flags" heated up, Næss decided to secure his position, and on the 15 November 1958, he established Anglo American Shipping Co. Ltd on Bermuda; thus, the vessels could fly the British flag.

== The flag of convenience fight ==
In 1958, the battle of convenience flags heated up and a boycott of ships sailing under such flags was declared by the ITF. Næss was having problems with insurance for his vessels and from a number of accusations of him being a "pirate." He was the chairman of the American Committee for Flags of Necessity, and as such, a highly visible target. He countered by registering vessels in Bermuda. The island required no taxes. He had to employ a British captain, chief engineer, and radio officer. Another benefit from using Bermuda was that quite a few charters were settled in British pounds, so using the British flag removed the currency risk.

Næss also counter-charged by attending a conference with major British newspapers on 10 July 1958, where he stressed his view that flags of convenience did not need to be substandard. If the ITF encountered substandard vessels, he would support a boycott of them, Næss argued. Ships with crews paid according to standards, and with a technical standard on a line with what international regulations required, should however not be targeted.

== Moving office to Bermuda ==
In the 1950s, Næss had offices in Nassau, Bahamas, but as he was not satisfied with the political conditions, he started searching for other options. He surveyed Panama City but found the city to be too far from New York, and it would be difficult to recruit good management there. He was advised to have a look at Bermuda, and found it favourable, so he moved his offices there.

Anglo American Shipping Co. Ltd was introduced on the London Stock Exchange in November 1959, the majority of the shares owned by Norness Shipping, the remainder owned by British investors and Næss's friends within New York finance. Five vessels were ordered for the company, the largest being the Naess Sovereign and Naess Champion; both were around 90,000 t DWT and built by Mitsubishi in Nagasaki, Japan. When delivered in January 1961 Naess Sovereign was the third largest tanker in the world, and the largest under the British flag. To manage the vessels Næss linked up with a company in Glasgow, establishing the firm Næss Denholm & Co. Ltd. For the shipping industry at large 1960 was a difficult year, with old tonnage laid up; Anglo American with its new vessels and long-time charters was an exception.

== Merger and ABC with P&O ==
Creating Anglo American and the transfer of a number of vessels on time-charter to that company partly changed Norness Shipping to an investment company, as it held 68.5% of Anglo American's shares. As the years 1959 - 1961 were bad in the tanker market Næss placed his attention on developing large bulk carriers and arranging "affreightment" contracts for them. The focus on Norness Shipping created anxiety among Anglo American shareholders as to whether enough was being done to expand that company. This created the basis for a merger between the two companies, but that was complicated as there were serious problems connected to taxation of shareholders. The tax problem for the US Norness Shipping shareholders was solved in February 1962 and the merger talks could start in detail. The final agreement was signed on 15 December 1962; the value of Næss's original $50,000 was now $44,000,000 and the new company was named Anglo Norness Shipping Company Ltd..

In 1962, Næss learned that P&O had ordered four bulk carriers, each of around 38,000 t DWT. Næss knew that this was a new area for P&O and arranged a meeting with the chairman, Sir Donald F. Anderson, whom he knew well from his Nortraship days. Næss proposed that the two companies should cooperate and pool their vessels into one joint owned company. P&O found the idea attractive and Associated Bulk Carriers Ltd. was established on 8 April 1964. The joint company was a huge success and by 1970 ABC contained 36 vessels with a total of 3,162,983 t DWT. Part of the success was that Næss was able to persuade the more conservative P&O to order a number of OBO carriers, thus adding flexibility to the concept.

== The OBO carrier ==
Næss was always searching for increased efficiency, and the long voyages ballasted for tankers posed an intriguing problem. In the mid of the 1950s, he started to think about a combination ship that could carry both oil and bulk cargoes. Oil and ore ships had been in operation since the 1920s, but a vessel with the capability of carrying both oil and bulk cargoes seemed impossible to construct. Næss pushed his chief naval architect T. M. Karlsen to keep researching the combined vessel, also checking in on various failed projects like the Mando Theodoracopulos. One of the deficiencies of that vessel was the small hatches, too small for efficient discharging.

In 1964, the Naess group started a collaboration with P&O in the form of the jointly owned company Associated Bulk Carriers, thus giving them access to P&O's vast technical department. The last hurdles were cleared under a meeting at the A. G. Weser shipyard in Bremen on 6 April 1964, and a contract for building the first combined vessel was signed. The vessel was christened 16 June 1965, as Naess Norseman. The German industrialist owning the shipyard proposed the type to be called Naess-type. Næss found it more appropriate to name it after the cargoes carried. Thus, the name for the new type was to be OBO for Oil-Bulk-Ore. The vessel performed as expected, with some 75% of the time with cargo and only 25% in ballast. The much increased time with cargo would then more than outweigh the 15% higher cost of the vessel. Adding to the versatility of the type was that the oil and bulk market often developed differently. The OBO ship could then trade with bulk cargoes when that market was on top, and change to oil when the demand for tanker tonnage was high.

== Trying years and the Zapata merger ==
After the boom from mid 1956 to mid 1957 the shipping markets were depressed for years to come. In spite of this the Anglo Norness Shipping Company had impressive results:

Year	Assets	Investments	# of shares	Shares value	Profit	Dividend paid
1958	$61.3 m	$10.1 m	6.0 m	$2.32	$3.6 m	$0.62
1959	$78.7 m	$16.2 m	6.2 m	$3.04	$3.4 m	$0.52
1960	$117.6 m	$17.1 m	7.2 m	$3.45	$4.2 m	$0.60
1961	$156.2 m	$15.1 m	7.8 m	$4.20	$5.3 m	$0.66
1962	$168.0 m	$18.8 m	8.8 m	$4.92	$4.8 m	$0.56
1963	$185.1 m	$17.9 m	9.3 m	$5.94	$6.7 m	$0.78
1964	$193.2 m	$19.0 m	9.5 m	$6.50	$8.1 m	$0.85

The cooperation with P&O in bulk carriers had started through Associated Bulk Carriers Ltd., and the battle of flags of convenience had been won. In twelve years the Anglo Norness fleet had expanded into one of the largest in the world, with 58 vessels totalling 2,450,000 DWT including new buildings and charters. The three years from 1964 were meagre for the Næss group.

The market continued to be depressed, and the group had losses on the chartered vessels. Næss was put under considerable pressure to abandon his policy of operating in the spot market but he strongly resisted long time charters as he believed the markets would recover. Then, in June 1967 the Six-Day War erupted, and the Suez Canal closed for years to come. This created an enormous surge in demand for tanker tonnage and the Næss group was ideally positioned with 16 large tankers available, receiving extremely good rates for its vessels.

With a strong financial situation Næss started thinking about the group's long-term strategy; the world economy was volatile, and there were inflationary pressure and currency problems. The company was courted by Occidental Petroleum Company and Zapata Offshore Company (founded in 1953 by George H. W. Bush), and the latter won the merger with an offer of $5 per share, valuing the company at $47.5 million. As a diversified offshore company Zapata seemed to be well positioned to take advantage of the expected boom in oil exploration and its offer was accepted in May 1968, and the company name changed to Zapata Norness Inc..

Næss started as a member of the board of the new company and initiated a huge expansion program, ordering a number of ship with a total 1,618,500 t DWT costing $163 million. As Zapata had its offices in Houston it became tedious for Næss to attend board meetings; he withdrew and his son Michael was elected in his place. By 1972 Næss grew more and more concerned over the huge volume of new buildings, he feared a collapse of the market and was thus positive when approached by P&O and Hilmar Reksten who offered to buy his fleet. Næss had very mixed feelings as he had been in shipping for more than 40 years, however, with his experience and background as an economist he anticipated a downturn in the market. He did not have to wait long to see his decision pay off.

In July 1973 the deal was closed and Anglo Norness was sold for $208 million. Today it would equal $1.2-1.6 billion. In October the OPEC cartel quadrupled the oil price creating the 1973 oil crisis and the tanker market crashed. Næss was quite self-critical and had lambasted himself after other decisions; however, he had reasons to be proud of the perfect timing of this deal.

== INTERTANKO and pollution ==
Even though being a staunch defender of personal initiative and unregulated business, Næss supported organisations that could solve problems specific for the business area voluntarily. The reasoning behind INTERTANKO was to organise the independent tanker owners and solve problems particular to the tanker market. In the 1960s it was scrapping old vessels; after the 1973 oil crisis this problem surfaced again. With his large fleet of tankers Næss was a natural participant, and after being a member of the executive committee he was elected chairman in 1976. Due to the large number of new buildings the rates in 1975 gave the shipowners huge losses; some $125 million on Persian Gulf to Europe alone. Of a total tanker tonnage of 286 million DWT close to 50 million DWT were laid up, while an equal amount sailed with reduced speed.

As the INTERTANKO president Næss concentrated on scrapping old tonnage, pollution and utilizing supertankers as floating storage tanks. Scrapping older vessels would reduce the amount of surplus tonnage, and this would then in the long run produce better rates. In trying to reduce the surplus tonnage Næss however got into arguments with the US Justice Department as they were on the verge of viewing his actions as violating the anti-trust laws. His job of promoting scrapping of old tonnage was however made easier by the grounding of the Argo Merchant off Nantucket in December 1976, a 23-year-old run-down tanker. The spillage from the grounding pushed the major US oil companies to examine the vessels they were chartering closely, thus eliminating a large group of old, badly kept vessels.

As a citizen of Bermuda Næss was acutely aware of the problem with marine pollution; taking a walk on his beach he could easily spot lumps of tare that most probably came from tankers. Næss was therefore a staunch supporter of reducing oil waste as much as possible. Næss linked up with the Norwegian explorer Thor Heyerdahl who had himself witnessed the increased pollution during his expeditions. Næss pushed forward various recommendations that INTERTANKO then took to the International Maritime Organization (IMO), the UN organisation responsible for improving maritime safety and to prevent marine pollution.

== Personal life ==
Naess had a daughter, Jennifer Leana, who was educated in England at the Priory of Our Lady of Good Counsel and in the US at Kent Place School, Summit, New Jersey. In 1954 she announced her engagement to Erik Moe, of Sandvika Norway.

== Retirement ==
Næss settled in Bermuda, buying land and building a hotel, but well into his old age, seemed always on the lookout for a good deal that could have him started again in shipping. He made generous donations to Bergen, especially the museum documenting the old hanseatic influence on the city. His personal lifestyle was frugal, a striking contrast to his shipowner colleagues who kept large yachts and mansions.

He loved gardening, and guests at his hotel sometimes took pity on the old guy having to work in the garden, giving him a dollar as they passed by.
