= List of ambassadors of Norway to the United Kingdom =

The Ambassador of Norway to the United Kingdom is Norway's foremost diplomatic representative in the United Kingdom, and in charge of the Norwegian diplomatic mission in the UK. Norway and the United Kingdom have exchanged diplomats since Norway became independent in 1905, when the polar explorer Fridtjof Nansen was appointed Minister. The Norwegian legation was upgraded to a full embassy during the Second World War when the Norwegian government sat in exile in London. The current Embassy is located in Belgravia in London.

== List of heads of mission ==
=== Envoys Extraordinary and Ministers Plenipotentiary to the United Kingdom ===
- 1906–1908: Fridtjof Nansen
- 1908–1910: Johannes Irgens
- 1910–1934: Benjamin Vogt
- 1934–1942: Erik Colban

=== Ambassadors to the United Kingdom ===
- 1942–1946: Erik Colban
- 1946–1959: Per Preben Prebensen
- 1959–1961: Erik Braadland
- 1962–1968: Arne Skaug
- 1968–1975: Paul Koht
- 1975–1982: Frithjof Jacobsen
- 1982–1989: Rolf Trygve Busch
- 1989–1994: Kjell Eliassen
- 1994–1996: Tom Vraalsen
- 1996–2000: Kjell Colding
- 2000–2005: Tarald Brautaset
- 2005–2010: Bjarne Lindstrøm
- 2010–2014: Kim Traavik
- 2014–2019: Mona Juul
- 2019–2023: Wegger Christian Strømmen
- 2023–present: Tore Hattrem
