= Benjamin Vogt (politician) =

Norwegian politician (1863–1947)

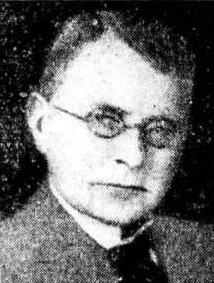

Norwegian Ambassador to the United Kingdom
- In office 1910–1934
- Prime Minister: Wollert Konow; Jens Bratlie; Gunnar Knudsen; Otto B. Halvorsen; Otto Blehr; Abraham Berge; J. L. Mowinckel; Christopher Hornsrud; Peder Kolstad; Jens Hundseid
- Preceded by: Johannes Irgens
- Succeeded by: Erik Colban

Minister of Trade
- In office 1 September 1904 – 11 March 1905
- Prime Minister: Francis Hagerup
- Preceded by: Jacob Schøning
- Succeeded by: Sofus Arctander

Minister of Auditing
- In office 1 September 1904 – 11 March 1905
- Prime Minister: Francis Hagerup
- Preceded by: Birger Kildal
- Succeeded by: Gunnar Knudsen

Member of the Council of State Division
- In office 22 October 1903 – 1 September 1904 Serving with Christian Michelsen
- Preceded by: Elias Sunde; Sigurd Ibsen
- Succeeded by: Birger Kildal; Jacob Schøning

Personal details
- Born: Paul Benjamin Vogt; 16 May 1863 Kristiansand, Vest-Agder, Sweden-Norway
- Died: 1 January 1947 (aged 83) Oslo, Norway
- Party: Conservative
- Spouse: Andrea Severine Heyerdahl (m. 1888)

Paul Benjamin Vogt (16 May 1863 – 1 January 1947) was a Norwegian politician of the Conservative Party who served as a member of the Council of State Division in Stockholm 1903–1904, Minister of Trade and Minister of Auditing 1904–1905. In 1905, he was Norway's emissary to Stockholm to negotiate Norwegian independence from Sweden. He also served as the Norway's minister in London 1910–1934.

== Personal life ==
He was born in Kristiansand as a son of politician Niels Petersen Vogt (1817–1894) and Kaia Ancher Arntzen (1819–1870). He was a brother of editor Nils Vogt (1859–1927) and a second cousin of Johan Herman Lie Vogt, Nils Collett Vogt and Ragnar Vogt.

He completed his examen artium at Oslo Cathedral School in 1880 before studying law at university.

In April 1888 he married Andrea Severine "Daisy" Heyerdahl (1864–1946), daughter of a physician. They had several children. Stener Vogt became a businessman and consul. Their daughter Alethe Heyerdahl Vogt married businessman Fredrik C. Blom. Their daughter Daisy Vogt was the first wife of Diderich H. Lund. Another daughter Marie Leigh "Leiken" Vogt was the wife of Ferdinand Schjelderup, then a cohabitant with Emil Stang Jr.

Diplomatic posts
Preceded by Johannes Irgens	Norwegian Minister to the United Kingdom; 1910–1934	Succeeded by Erik Colban
