= Kim Traavik =

Norwegian diplomat and politician

Kim Traavik (born 11 July 1946) is a Norwegian diplomat and politician for the Conservative Party.

He was born in Oslo and is a cand.polit. by education. He started working for the Norwegian Ministry of Foreign Affairs in 1977, and served as counsellor at the United Nations embassy in Brussels from 1994 to 1997. He was the Norwegian ambassador to OSCE from 1997 to 1999, deputy under-secretary of state in the Ministry of Foreign Affairs from 2000 to 2001 and State Secretary from 2001 to 2005 in Bondevik's Second Cabinet. He was the Norwegian ambassador to NATO from 2006 to 2010, and to the United Kingdom from 2010 to 2014.

In 2014 he was appointed national security coordinator and special adviser to Prime Minister Erna Solberg. He stayed for one year before becoming special adviser in the Ministry of Foreign Affairs.

Diplomatic posts
| Preceded by Kai Eide | Norwegian Permanent Representative to NATO; 2006–2010 | Succeeded by Vegard Ellefsen |
| Preceded by Bjarne Lindstrøm | Norwegian Ambassador to the United Kingdom; 2010-2014 | Succeeded by Mona Juul |
