= Margit Tveiten =

Norwegian diplomat

Margit Fredrikke Tveiten (born 27 August 1961) is a Norwegian diplomat.

She was born in Kristiansand and is a cand.mag. and cand.jur. by education. She started working for the Norwegian Ministry of Foreign Affairs in 1988, and had a stint in the European Bank for Reconstruction and Development from 1992 to 1994. From 2004 to 2007 she led the Parliament of Norway International Secretariat, before embarking on a period as Norwegian ambassador to Iceland from 2007 to 2010. After four years as subdirector and three years as deputy under-secretary in the Ministry of Foreign Affairs she served as the Norwegian ambassador to Italy from 2017.

Diplomatic posts
Preceded by Bjørn T. Grydeland	Norwegian ambassador to Italy; 2017–	Succeeded by incumbent
