= Sven Erik Svedman =

Norwegian diplomat and politician

Sven Erik Svedman (born 13 October 1946) is a Norwegian diplomat and politician for the Conservative Party.

He is a siv.øk. by education, and started working for the Norwegian Ministry of Foreign Affairs in 1973. From 1989 to 1990, he served as a State Secretary in the Ministry of Foreign Affairs as a part of Syse's Cabinet. He was then minister and deputy ambassador at the Norwegian embassy in the United States from 1990 to 1994, and Norwegian ambassador to Israel from 1994 to 1997. After serving as Deputy Under-Secretary of State in the Ministry of Foreign Affairs, he served as ambassador to France from 2003 to 2005. He was then permanent under-secretary of state in the Ministry of Foreign Affairs from 2005 to 2007, and Norwegian ambassador to Germany from 2007 to 2014. Leaving the position at Chief Economist at the Norwegian Ministry of Foreign Affairs, he was appointed as President of the EFTA Surveillance Authority for the period 1 September 2015 to 31 December 2017.

Civic offices
Preceded by Bjarne Lindstrøm	Permanent under-secretary of state in the Norwegian Ministry of Foreign Affairs; 2005–2007	Succeeded by Bjørn T. Grydeland
Diplomatic posts
Preceded by Rolf Trolle Andersen	Norwegian ambassador to France; 2003–2005	Succeeded by Bjørn Skogmo
Preceded by Bjørn Tore Godal	Norwegian ambassador to Germany; 2007-2014	Succeeded by Elisabeth Walaas
