= Ole Irgens (politician) =

Norwegian politician (1829–1906)

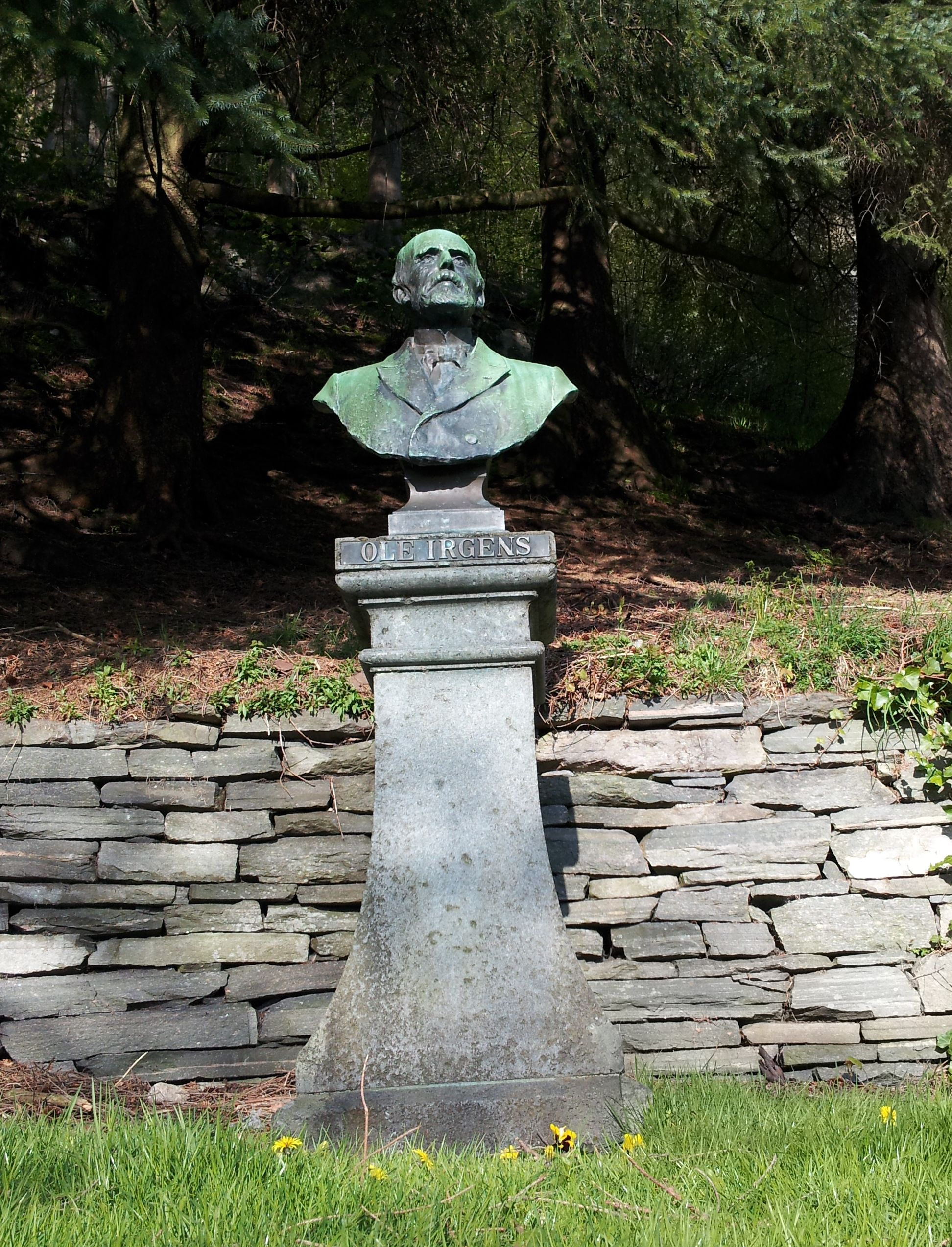
Irgens' bust at Fjellveien, Bergen, Norway

Ole Irgens (6 April 1829 - 14 April 1906) was a Norwegian politician.

He was a relative of the eighteenth century bishop of the same name. He enrolled as a student in 1848 and graduated as cand.theol. in 1853. While working as the first Inspector of Schools in Bergen he was elected to the Norwegian Parliament, in 1868. He served one term only.

In 1862 he set up a new plan for the state schools in Bergen, which also included the new Technical College in Bergen. The plan detailed the syllabus, necessary new buildings programme and a new payment framework for the teachers. Whilst a member of The Norwegian Parliament (Storting) he participated actively in the formation and implementation of the law reforming the state schools in Norwegian cities. He was one of the founders of The Norwegian Mission to the Seamen, and its first chairman. He became knight of the Order of St Olav.

He was a prominent figure in Bergen, and published several texts on practical pedagogy and the church's role and organisation. He died in 1906 in Bergen.
