= Ingolf Hysing Olsen =

Norwegian shipowner (1883–1961)

Ingolf Hysing Olsen KBE (3 April 1883 – 12 August 1961) was a Norwegian shipowner. He was born in Bergen. He chaired the Nortraship London office from 1940 to 1948. He was decorated Knight Commander of the Order of the British Empire. He was decorated Commander with star of the Order of St. Olav in 1945.
