= Erik Colban =

Norwegian diplomat (1876–1956)

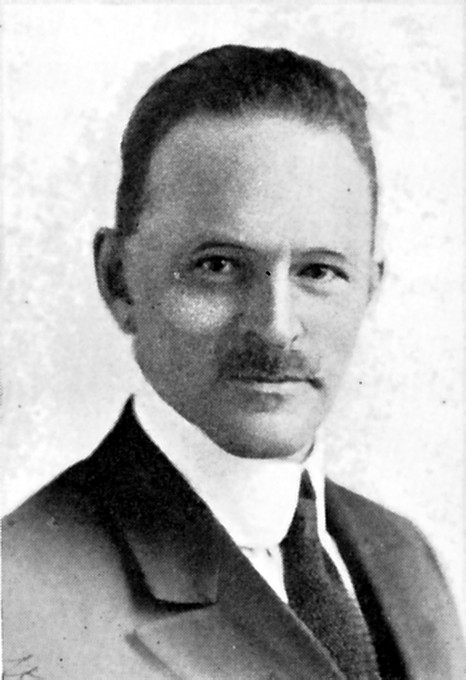
Erik Colban

Erik Andreas Colban (18 October 1876 – 28 March 1956) was a Norwegian diplomat. Colban had many important roles in Norwegian diplomacy; especially being named to the post of Norwegian Ambassador in London before and during the Second World War. Colban also worked with the League of Nations and the United Nations where Norwegian Trygve Lie served as the Secretary-General of the United Nations.

== Overview ==
=== Personal life ===
Colban was a son of Captain Erik Andreas Colban (1841–1900) who was a captain of the Norwegian army. His grandfather Erik Andreas Colban (1760–1828) had been a dean in the districts of Lofoten and Vesterålen.

In 1911, Colban was married to Karen Marie Holter. The couple's son, Erik Andreas Colban, entered the diplomatic service and was ambassador as was his father. In 1952, Colban published his memoirs about his career as a diplomat in the book Femti år (Oslo: Aschehoug).

=== Career ===
Colban took his final exams in 1895 and then began studying law. He completed his law degree in 1899.

Colban entered the Norwegian Ministry of Foreign Affairs in 1905. In 1918, Colban took the position as a director of the Minorities Section at the League of Nations. In 1930, Colban went back to the Norwegian foreign service.

Colban served a Norwegian ambassador to Great Britain (1942–1946) representing the Norwegian government during World War II and the Occupation of Norway by Nazi Germany. He led the Norwegian delegation that participated in the preparations for the establishment of the United Nations and participated as a Norwegian delegate in the first general meeting.

He was also one of four Norwegian members of the United Nations War Crimes Commission, together with Jacob Aars Rynning, Finn Palmstrøm and Terje Wold.

=== Honors ===
Colban was appointed Knight First Class of the Order of St. Olav in 1912, promoted to Commander with Star in 1931 and awarded the Grand Cross in 1946. Additionally, Colban received a number of awards from foreign governments including Commander of the Order of Dannebrog, Commander of the Swedish Order of the Polar Star, holder of the Grand Cross of the Order of the Crown (Belgium) and was a Grand Officier of the French Legion of Honor.

== Early life ==
Erik Colban was born in Kristiania on 18 October 1876. As the son of Erik Andreas Colban (1841–1900) who was a captain in the Army and Caroline Emilie Biermann he was part of a long line of clergy and military men and officials dating back to the pre-1814 Danish-Norwegian Kingdom. In 1911 Erik Colban married Karen Marie Holter and the couple had a son, Erik Andreas Colban, who also entered the diplomatic service and became an ambassador like his father.

In 1899 Erik finished his law degree and soon after he became a solicitor for the chief administrative officer in Romsdal. In 1901 Erik was employed as a lawyer for Garup Meidel in Oslo until March 1903 where he began working at the Department of Foreign Affairs of the Ministry of Foreign Affairs, Trade, Shipping and Industry(Departementet for udenrigske Sager, Handel, Sjøfart og Industri). One of his main areas of interest during this period was the dissolution of the Norwegian union with Sweden. The public discussion in Norway concerned whether or not the dissolution of the union was in line with Norwegian Constitutional Law. Despite his position as a civil servant, Erik publicly criticised the union as a matter of Constitutional Law and instead he claimed that the dissolution had been in violation of international law, and was later asked by Fridtjof Nansen to write an account of the issue.

In 1905 he went on to pursue an academic career and went to Paris on a scholarship. Upon his arrival in France he was quickly asked to serve at the Norwegian consulate in Le Havre where he moved in 1906. He returned to Oslo in the fall of 1906 as the head of office responsible for the consulate service. In 1908 he moved to Stockholm and was appointed chargé d'affaires. He carried out his responsibilities in Stockholm until he was offered to move to Rio de Janeiro where he was again appointed chargé d'affaires in 1911.

From 1916 to the end of the First World War he assisted Nils Claus Ihlen who was foreign minister of Norway, on how Norway should handle the war in Europe. He traveled back and forth to London where he met with Sir Cyril William Hurcomb and negotiated payment for the ships that Norway provided for Allied forces. During the war he was also very focused on Norway's contribution to foreign affairs in general.

== Director of the League of Nation's Minorities Section. 1919–1927 ==
=== Origins of the Minorities Section ===
Colban was fundamental in the development of the League of Nations minorities section. As a consequence of the treaties of the 1919- Paris Peace Conference- the League of Nations found itself responsible for monitoring and defending minority groups across Europe. The irregularity of the League Council's meetings and a sense of minority issues being of minor importance, made these issues increasingly treated by the secretariat itself.

At the founding of the League of Nations in 1919, the role of the League Secretariat had been envisioned as purely advisory and administrative – a collection of experts aiding the workings of the council's delegate. However, the administrative personnel of the secretariat would increasingly have to redefine their own roles and responsibilities in the system.

Erik Colban, who became the director of the minorities section of the League of Nations and it's 'spiritual father' in 1919, found himself to be a member of an entirely new class of international bureaucrats. Thus, Colban proved to be an instrumental figure in creating and developing the policy on minorities. He created a system which 'was surprisingly able to keep myriad minority problems from tearing Europe apart far sooner.

=== Development of the Minorities Section ===
Through personal interaction and administrative mastery, Colban helped to protect and develop the minorities system. As the League Council initially distanced itself from the responsibility of dealing with minority issues, it gave Colban the liberty to further develop the petition system (as seen below). The Minorities section attempted to develop a practical translation of the unworkable terms of article 12 of the League of Nations. Thus, Colban created a process where minority violations could be addressed through quiet and secret channels.

Colban established 1: A formal procedure for receiving and distributing minority petitions 2: A "committee-of-three" system, whereby every petition deemed receivable by the secretariat was examined by an ad hoc group of council members (the acting president + two selected governments) to determine whether a treaty violation had occurred and if it should or should not be reported to the council. The initial system had thrown the minority petitions onto public stage, with little action taken due to intense public scrutiny.

Colban's personal interaction with major governmental figures of minority states was an important instrument to the success of the minorities section. By the end of 1924, Colban and members of the Section had travelled to Belgrade, Sofia, Bucharest, Transylvania, Athens, Bulgaria, Budapest, Vienna, and Prague multiple times, and Colban personally spent around six months each year abroad.

Furthermore, Colban ensured that his Minorities Section undertook an increasing responsibility for the examination and action upon these petitions. Specifically, the Minorities Section employed detailed evaluation of the "receivability" of petitions. Colban and the Section became instrumental in the formation of and action regarding these petitions, he and his staff became the 'gatekeeper' of the petitions.

=== Challenges to the system from within the League ===
Conflicts between the Minorities Section and the minority states eventually proved inevitable. Complaints from the minority states Poland and Czechoslovakia about floods of propagandistic petitions and accusations of the committees multiplying minority complaints, led to a challenge from several minority states within the League in 1923.

The challenging states attempted to wreck Colban's system of Committee-of-three by means of obstruction and proposals for "reform". To avoid endangering League authority, Colban and the secretariat skilfully recalibrated the systems. In September 1923, the council adopted a series of resolutions tightening the rules of receivability of petitions, granting generous extensions to accused governments to prepare their observations and restricting the distribution of all materials to council members alone. Being a beneficial development for minority states and the great powers (putting less pressure in minority states and thus easing tensions in the league), but a decremental development for the minorities themselves, this is an example of the lengths to which Colban was willing to go in order to preserve the system. In spite of an inherent sympathy towards minorities, Colban proved to be a pragmatist by necessity – balancing concerns of the minorities with concerns over European peace required skilful political acrobatics.

=== Minority activists critique of the system ===
As Colban and the League system was bound by the principle of state sovereignty, they not only guarded the minority states' interests and dismissed all but the most politically explosive complaints, they also blocked outside improvement proposals. This approach was severely criticised by minority activists such as professor Gilbert Murray, an Oxford classicist, both for its favouring the interests of the minority states over those of the minorities, and for the secrecy involved in dealing with petitions, leading to suspicions of them disappearing in the swollen bureaucracy.

Colban, who defined his task as transforming 30 million individuals into "loyal citizens", was unmoved by this criticism.

=== The effect of Germany upon the Minorities Section ===
On 25 October 1925, Germany supported financially the organization of a European Minorities Congress. The leaders of the Minority Groups from Eastern Europe met in Geneva. Colban did not want, that this gathering changed the functioning of the minority section of the League by reform proposals. As a consequence, he reinforced the publicity about their achievements.

James Eric Drummond, the secretary general of the League and Colban found another way of representing the minorities section, which excluded states, minorities and neighbouring states to participate in the decision making that could concern them in one way or the other. This was a compromise in order to gain support from the neighbouring states of Germany and the German government and was advised by Colban.

When Germany received its permanent seat at the council in 1926, Colban started tutoring Stresemann on how to attend to minority affairs. He even succeeded in convincing the German delegates to wait a year before participating in the minorities section, until they understood the situation completely. This manoeuvre kept Germany from presenting any questions regarding minorities to the general assembly until 1930. Working with the Germans, Colban managed to convince them that theLeague's system of secret compromise was effective and desirable.

No changes were made in the section while Colban was in office. It was only in regards to the petitioners that changes were made, but the changes of the internal structure could not gain approval.

When changes to the minorities section were laid for the general assembly later on, Chamberlain opposed the changes and argued it worked properly during Colban's leadership.

== Late career ==
In his late career, Colban held several important positions working both as an international bureaucrat and as a representative for the Norwegian government.

From 1927 to 1930, Colban worked as the director of the disarmament section of the League – disarmament being, Colban though, among the most crucial issues in order to secure peace. On this issue, Colban faced increasing resistance from the Great Powers (in particular Britain and France).

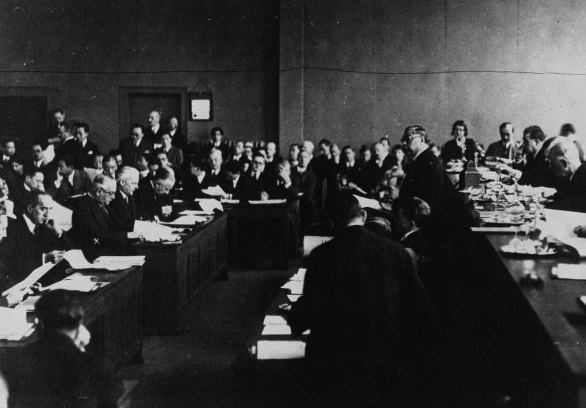
Chinese delegates speaking at the League of Nations session on the Manchurian Crisis, 1932.

In 1930 Colban returned to the Foreign Service as envoy to Paris and Brussels and Luxembourg. He remained in touch, however, with the League of Nation environment and became the Norwegian delegate to the disarmament conference and to the League's annual sessions. Moreover, he was actively engaged in the Manchuria conflict. Colban left the League of Nations in 1934, when he was appointed as envoy to London (Ambassador from 1942).

Erik Colban, now an experienced diplomat, belonged to the traditional school of diplomats used to act only on instruction from the government. Following the German invasion of Norway, 9 April 1940, Colban was cut off from communication with the government. Not receiving instructions, Colban was accused of inaction, especially in relation to orders to the merchant fleet. Later, Colban would be involved in setting up the Norwegian Shipping and Trade Mission (Nortraship), a crucial contribution to the Allied War effort.

The Norwegian exile-government had much use of Colban's language skills and diplomatic know-how. In 1941 Colban headed the committee drafting the Norwegian-British military agreement, and it was not least thanks to his efforts that Norway reached a very favourable settlement with Britain in 1943. Towards the end of the war, Colban influenced the Norwegian government's decision to support a United Nations dominated by the great powers, and he was appointed the Norwegian delegate to the UN's first general assembly in 1945. In 1943, he became a member of the United Nations' War Crimes Commission and the inter-allied committee that set up the International Court of Justice in The Hague.

After his retirement as ambassador in 1946, Colban was still a part of diplomatic life. From 1946 to 1947 he was chairman of the Norwegian delegation for the preparation of a broad international UN conference on trade and administration. He was also the Norwegian delegate to the Havana Conference during 1947–48. As a final point in his career from 1948 to 1950 Colban became the personal representative for the UN secretary general Trygve Lie, in the negotiations between India and Pakistan concerning Kashmir. In 1952 Colban published his autobiography Fifty Years (Femti Aar).

=== The question of individual rights vs. state rights ===
After the Second World War, the question about international law and national sovereignty was a broadly discussed issue. The founding of the United Nations brought a different approach to the question of human rights. The focus of the League of Nations was a commitment to collective rights of the states themselves, and now the postwar approach was centered on individual human rights. However, minority protection was regarded as weak and obscure. As a member of the UN, Colban was opposed the idea of a European superstate and to strong interference into national issues. This was due to the problems he experienced arising from the interference of the League of Nations into minority politics in Eastern Europe during the interwar period. Acknowledgement of the sovereignty of the nation-states was a key concern of the UN and this was a point in its Charts, which was not to be changed, in order to secure peace. It was absolutely imperative to avoid repeating the mistakes of the League of Nations.

=== The UN as a tool for peace ===
For Colban the primary aim of the UN as well as of the League of Nations was keeping the peace. Unlike the League of Nations, it was to be a permanent organization, but also a world organization, in order to be able to preserve peace. He saw the reason for the failure of the League of Nations in the fact, that important nation states were not members. In order to be able to do better, the UN was to include all states willing to participate and work against the possibility of countries of resigning. This opinion of Colban was also to be understood against the background of the Cold War. He sensed, that if the UN was not able to keep the Soviet Union as a member, this would endanger peace. He even proposed, if the statutes of the UN was to be updated, member resignation should be made impossible. At the same time, he was contemplating weakening the veto, with which USSR was making things difficult. He thought that the specialized agencies of the UN were a very important part of the organisation, their work indirect, but indispensable for world peace.

== Reflections on international institutions ==
In 1954, when Colban was retired, he wrote an article titled The United Nation As A Permanent World Organisation where he reflected on the UN and League of Nations. In the article he gave his thought on whether or not the UN would survive or if it would fail like its predecessor had. He especially focused on what had been done wrong in the League of Nations, and what, as a consequence, had been changed in the UN charters.

One of his main statements was that the tasks of the UN should be both political and non-political, meaning that it should secure peace, but at the same time working towards solving economic, social, cultural and humanitarian issues. Another very important element he mentions that should secure the survival of the UN was that every nation was a member and that it should not be allowed to withdraw ones membership, which was not the case with the League of Nations. He quotes a Spanish official in saying that it would be impossible to imagine a world without an institution such as the UN.

== Bibliography ==
Diplomatic posts
Preceded by Benjamin Vogt	Norwegian Minister to the United Kingdom; 1934–1942	Succeeded by Title abolished
Preceded by New title	Norwegian Ambassador to the United Kingdom; 1942–1946	Succeeded by Per Preben Prebensen
