= Atle Leikvoll =

Norwegian diplomat

Atle Leikvoll (born 25 May 1951) is a Norwegian diplomat.

He is a siv.øk. by education and started working for the Norwegian Ministry of Foreign Affairs in 1992. He served as deputy under-secretary of state from 1995 to 1999, and then four years as consul-general in New York City. Returning to the Ministry of Foreign Affairs as special adviser from 2003 and assisting permanent under-secretary of state from 2005, he served as the Norwegian ambassador to the European Union from 2011 to 2015.

Diplomatic posts
Preceded by Oda Sletnes	Norwegian ambassador to the European Union; 2011–2015	Succeeded by Oda Sletnes
