= Ole Irgens (bishop) =

18th and 19th-century Norwegian Lutheran bishop

The Right Reverend Ole Irgens

Personal details
- Born: 22 January 1724 Surendal, Norway
- Died: 15 October 1803 (aged 79) Bergen, Norway
- Denomination: Church of Norway
- Occupation: Priest

Ole Irgens (22 January 1724—15 October 1803) was a priest and theologian. He was a bishop in the Church of Norway from 1779 to 1803.

Irgens was born in Surendal in Møre og Romsdal county, Norway, to vicar Johannes Irgens. He enrolled as a student in 1741, but was examined two years later and was hired as chaplain under his father. He left in 1756 to become a ship's priest in Morocco, but citing health problems, he returned to Norway in 1760 to become vicar at Faaberg Church. In 1773 he was promoted to vicar in the Nidaros Cathedral and (at the same time) he was also the diocesan dean (stiftsprovst) in the Diocese of Nidaros. He served as vice praeses of the Royal Norwegian Society of Sciences and Letters from 1773 to 1780.

In 1779 Irgens took a doctorate with the thesis De spiritu oris Jehovae creante, ps. 33. v. 6. The same year he was appointed bishop of the Diocese of Bjørgvin. He held this post until his death in 1803, having been blind for the last five years of his life. Many of his publications and speeches have been preserved.

Religious titles
Preceded by Søren Friedlieb	Bishop of Bjørgvin; 1779–1803	Succeeded by Johan Nordahl Brun
Academic offices
Preceded by Johan Ernst Gunnerus	Vice praeses of the Royal Norwegian Society of Sciences and Letters; 1773–1780	Succeeded by Christian Frederik Hagerup
