= List of ambassadors of Norway to the United States =

Coordinates: 38.925°N 77.066667°W

Ambassador of Norway to the United States Embassy of Norway in Washington, D.C.
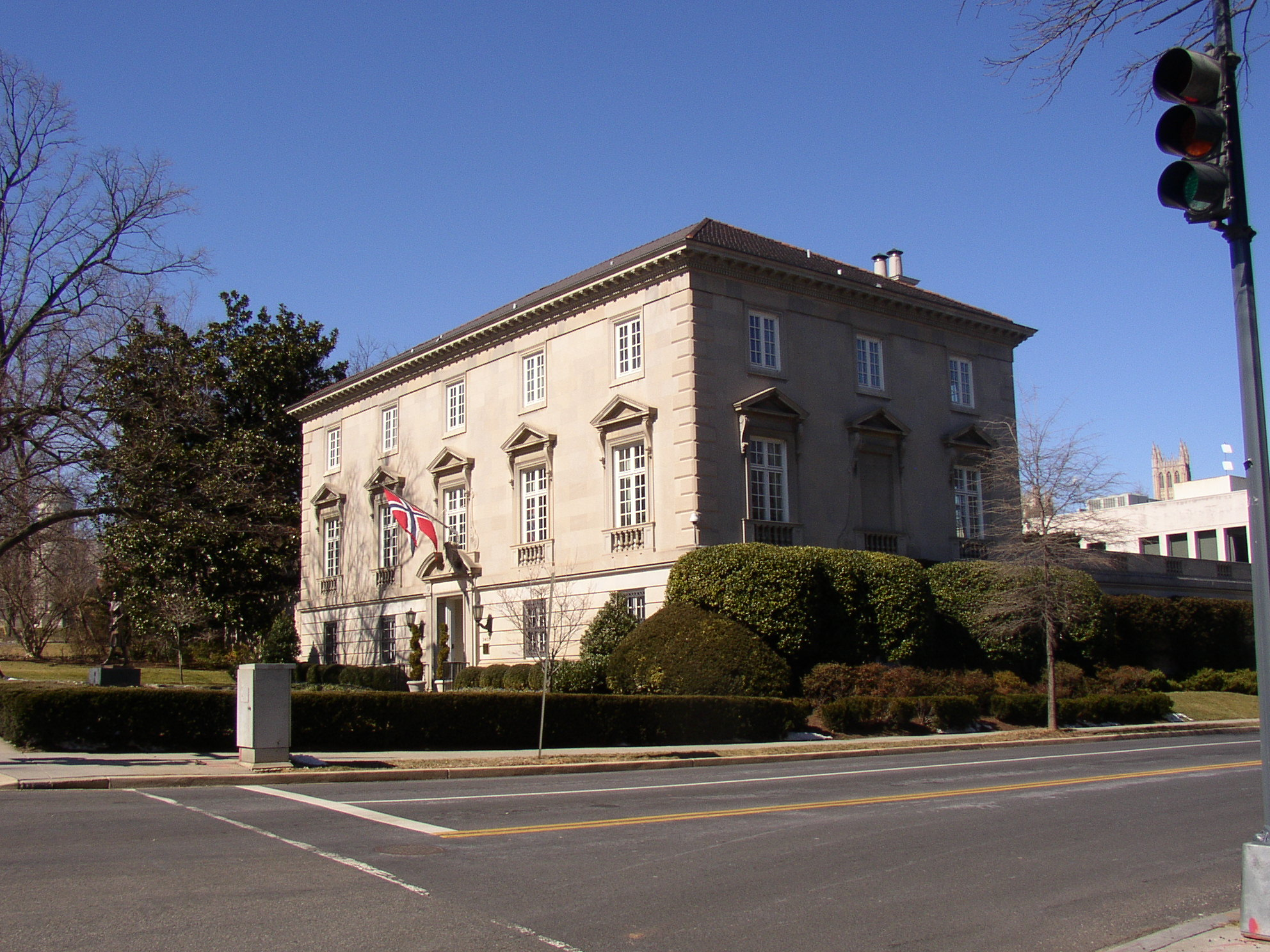
- Incumbent; Anniken Huitfeldt since August 26, 2024
- Inaugural holder: Johan Anton Wolf Grip
- Formation: June 1, 1889

The Norwegian ambassador to the United States is the official representative of the Government of Norway to the Government of the United States.

== List of Norwegian Representatives ==
Norwegian representatives
Diplomatic agrément	Diplomatic accreditation	Ambassador	Observations	List of heads of government of Norway	List of presidents of the United States	Term end
June 1, 1889		Johan Anton Wolf Grip	Listed as Sweden and Norway, J. A. W. Grip, his majesty's envoy extraordinary and (1844—1922) — Minister in Washington from 1889 — pronounced in a private letter to Blehr of 19 June 1899	Emil Stang	Benjamin Harrison	
December 1, 1905		Johan Anton Wolf Grip	Listed as Norway	Christian Michelsen	Theodore Roosevelt	
November 1, 1905		Hjalmar Christian Hauge	Chargé d'affaires Lovland named Hjalmar Christian Hauge as Chargé d'affaires ad interim at Washington on October 31.	Christian Michelsen	Theodore Roosevelt	
April 1, 1906	April 25, 1906	Hjalmar Christian Hauge		Christian Michelsen	Theodore Roosevelt	
April 23, 1908		Ove Gude	Norwegian Minister To The United States.	Wollert Konow	Theodore Roosevelt	
July 5, 1910		Wilhelm Thorleif de Munthe de Morgenstierne	Chargé d'affaires	Wollert Konow	William Howard Taft	
July 23, 1910		Christopher Ravn	Chargé d'affaires	Wollert Konow	William Howard Taft	
September 21, 1910		Ole Skybak	Chargé d'affaires, Ole Skybak, Secretary Of the Norwegian legation at Washington, was appointed counselor of the legation at Berlin.	Wollert Konow	William Howard Taft	
November 1, 1910		Helmer Halvorsen Bryn		Wollert Konow	Barack Obama	
December 1, 1926		Alexis Harold Gustav Oscar Lundh	Chargé d'affaires, Alexis Harold Gustav Lundh	Ivar Lykke	Calvin Coolidge	
December 29, 1927		Halvard Bachke	Halvard H. Bachke represented	Ivar Lykke	Calvin Coolidge	
June 8, 1934		Wilhelm von Munthe af Morgenstierne		Johan Ludwig Mowinckel	Franklin D. Roosevelt	
May 13, 1942			Legation Raised To Embassy	Vidkun Quisling	Franklin D. Roosevelt	
May 13, 1942		Wilhelm von Munthe af Morgenstierne		Vidkun Quisling	Franklin D. Roosevelt	
March 13, 1958	March 27, 1958	Paul Gruda Koht		Einar Gerhardsen	Dwight D. Eisenhower	
September 19, 1963	November 1, 1963	Hans Engen		John Lyng	Lyndon B. Johnson	
September 8, 1966	September 9, 1966	Arne Christian Gunneng		Per Borten	Lyndon B. Johnson	
July 30, 1973		Knut Sverre	Chargé d'affaires	Trygve Bratteli	Richard Nixon	
October 25, 1973	November 9, 1973	Søren Christian Sommerfelt (diplomat)		Trygve Bratteli	Richard Nixon	
January 13, 1979		Bjorn Earth	Chargé d'affaires	Odvar Nordli	Jimmy Carter	
January 17, 1979	March 1, 1979	Knut Hedemann		Odvar Nordli	Jimmy Carter	
September 7, 1984	November 26, 1984	Kjell Eliassen		Gro Harlem Brundtland	Ronald Reagan	
January 17, 1989	February 7, 1989	Kjeld Vibe		Jan P. Syse	George H. W. Bush	
July 8, 1996	July 29, 1996	Tom Vraalsen	Tom Eric Vraalsen	Thorbjørn Jagland	Bill Clinton	
March 7, 2001	March 13, 2001	Knut Vollebæk		Kjell Magne Bondevik	George W. Bush	
October 10, 2009	November 5, 2009	Wegger Christian Strømmen		Jens Stoltenberg	Barack Obama	2013
August 22, 2013	September 17, 2013	Kåre R. Aas	Kaare Reidar Aas	Erna Solberg	Barack Obama	
