= Skarstein (surname) =

Skarstein is a surname. Notable people with the surname include:

- Asbjørn Skarstein (1922–1999), Norwegian civil servant and diplomat
- Birgit Skarstein (born 1989), Norwegian competitive adaptive rower and para cross-country skier
- Inger-Lise Skarstein (born 1937), Norwegian politician
- Jakob Skarstein (1921–2021), Norwegian radio personality
- Rune Skarstein (born 1940), Norwegian economist
- Vigdis Moe Skarstein (born 1946), Norwegian librarian
