= Hedemann =

Hedemann is a surname. Notable people with the surname include:

- Christian Hedemann (1852–1932), Danish mechanical engineer
- Hans Hedemann (1792–1859), Danish officer
- Knut Hedemann (1922–2011), Norwegian diplomat
- Rudolf Hedemann (1889–1978), Norwegian politician

== See also ==
- Heidemann
