= Norwegian Christmas Tree in Washington, D.C. =

Christmas tree in Washington, D.C

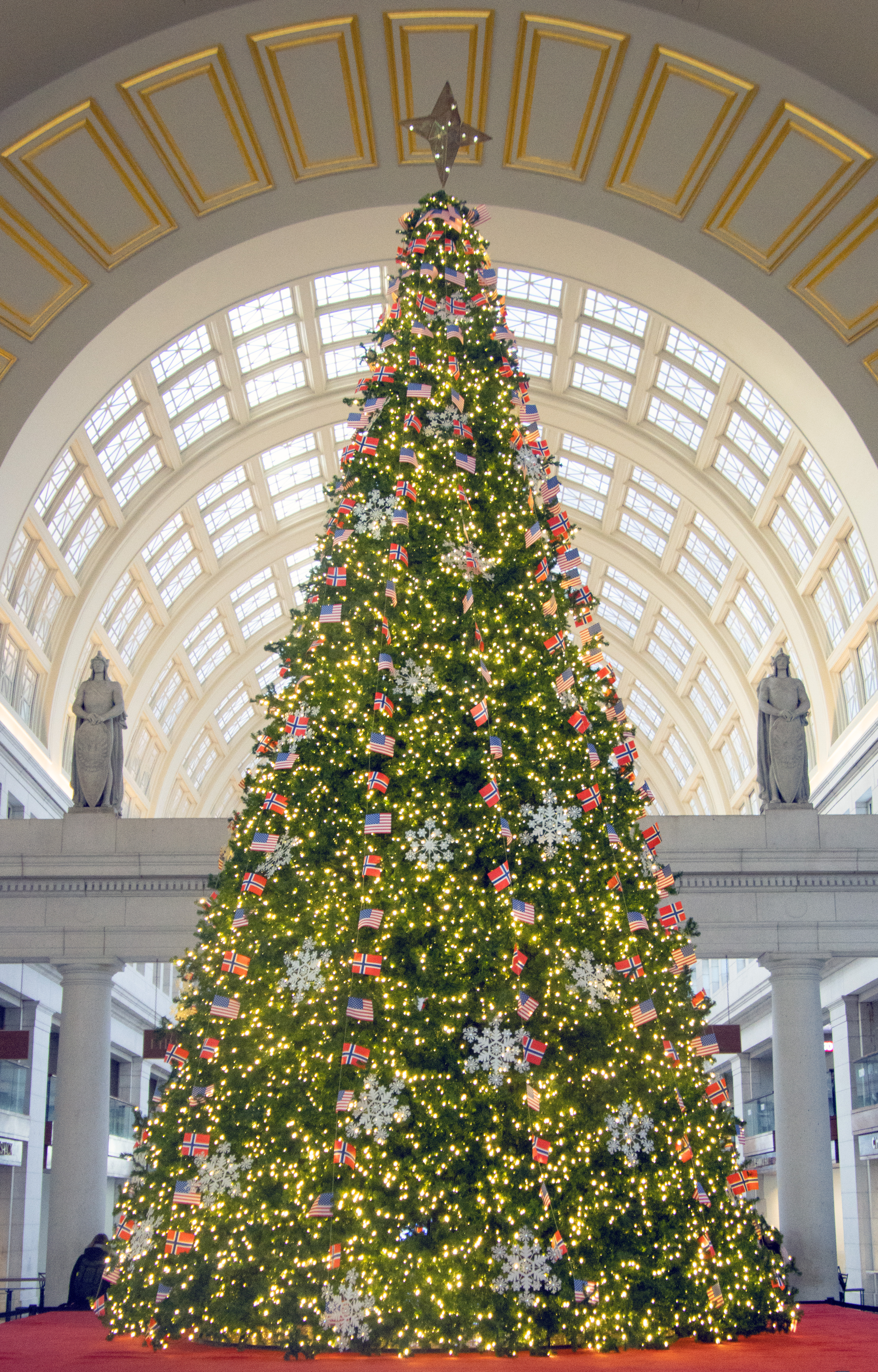
Norwegian Christmas tree at Washington Union Station in 2023

The Norwegian Christmas Tree in Washington, D.C., is an annual gift from the people of Norway to the United States that is displayed in Washington Union Station. The tradition began in 1997 after a proposal by Ambassador Tom Vraalsen. The tree in Union Station is one of several that Norway donates to various countries as a gift of thanks for assistance in World War II. The tree lighting ceremony involves concerts, a model train track, and visits by the Norwegian royal family, amongst other events. The tree is between 30 and 35 feet (9.1 and 10.7 m) tall and is decorated with thousands of lights, the flags of the U.S. and Norway, and themed ornaments. One year the tree was decorated with 700 ornaments depicting The Scream by Norwegian Edvard Munch. According to one reporter from the Hill Rag, the tree and model train have become "one of Washington's most popular holiday traditions."

== History ==
=== 1990s ===
In 1997, the government of Norway delivered a Christmas tree to Washington Union Station, as a sign of goodwill between the two countries and as a gift of thanks for U.S. assistance during World War II. The Norwegian government was already donating Christmas trees to London, Rotterdam, Reykjavík, and Antwerp, as well.

The mayor of Oslo, Per Ditlev-Simonsen, attended the lighting ceremony of the 30-foot (9.1 m) tree. Norwegian Americans attending Luther College had planted the tree, and its selection by the Norwegian government avoided U.S. import restrictions on plants. Mayor Marion Barry was given a plaque by his Oslo counterpart.

In addition to the goodwill reasoning behind the tree, Ambassador Tom Vraalsen came up with the idea of donating the tree since there were more Norwegian Americans than residents of Norway. Before the tree lighting ceremony, there was a week-long celebration at Union Station, including a Norwegian train model on display, Norwegian cuisine prepared by a chef from the Culinary Institute of Norway, and a showing of the Norwegian film Private Confessions. The model train and its journey through scenes of Norway was designed by Styrkar Braathen from the Norwegian Museum of Science and Technology.

The following year, the celebration became even more elaborate, with the National Symphony Orchestra performing, dances and vocal performances, and a visit by Liv Ullmann who introduced Haakon, Crown Prince of Norway. The tree was also larger at 35-feet (10.7 m) tall, with 8,000 lights, and 2,000 small flags of Norway and the United States. President Bill Clinton and First Lady Hillary Clinton wrote a letter for the event, saying the tree was "a fitting symbol of the strong roots of Norwegians in America and of the enduring friendship between our two countries." In 1999, there was an exhibition on the Northern Lights, in addition to the tree, train, and other festivities. The train track recreated scenes from around Norway.

=== 2000s ===
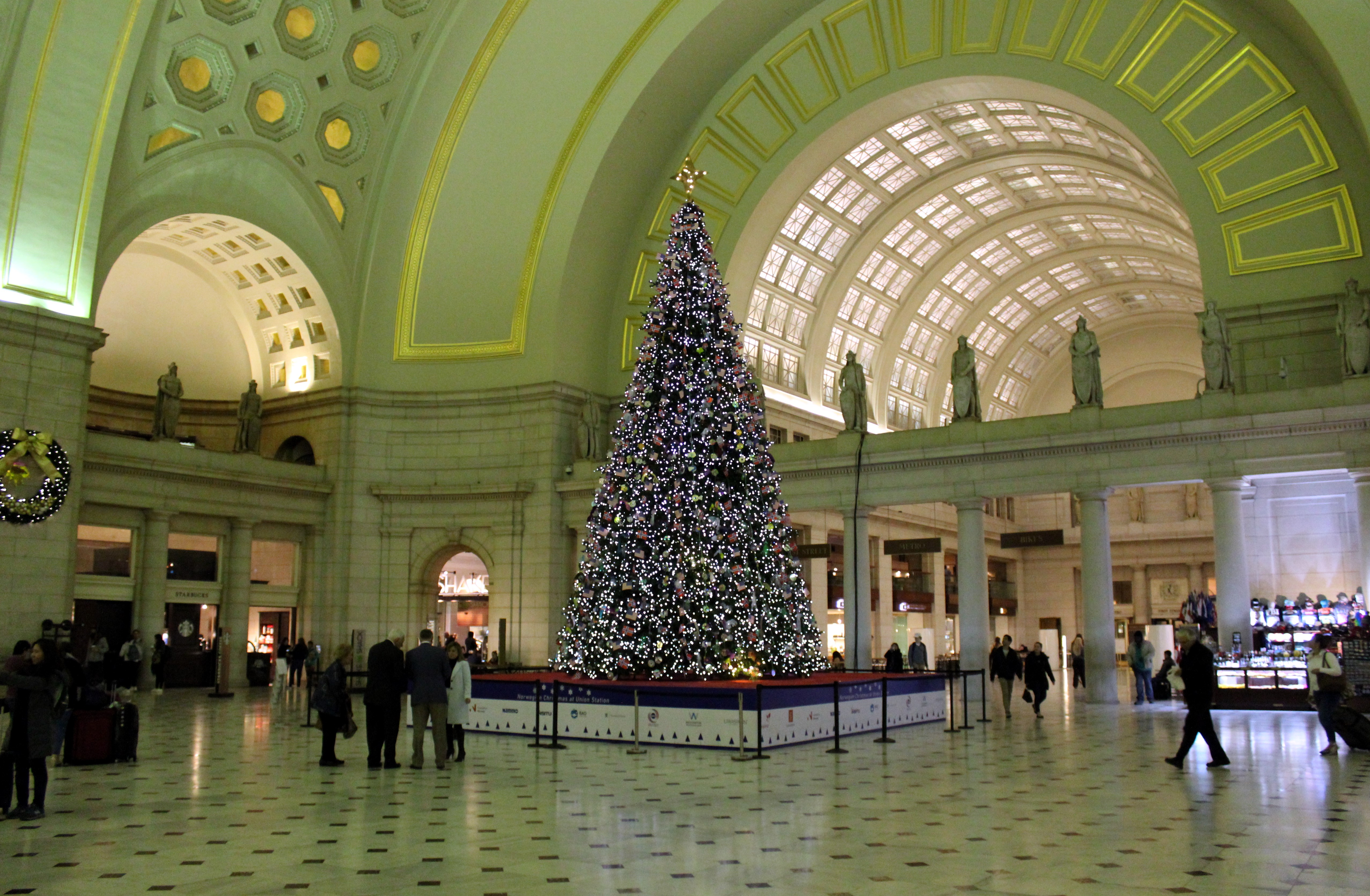
The Christmas tree in Union Station's Great Hall in 2018

The tradition of donating a tree and a train station continued into the 21st-century. In 2004, celebrations included a choir performing after an invitation by Ambassador Knut Vollebæk, and Princess Märtha Louise of Norway lighting the tree. Vollebæk said he "hoped that the tree would bring Norway, Europe and the United States closer." By 2007, the event was expanded to six weeks. A Norwegian diplomat from the Embassy of Norway said the donation of a yearly tree "was inspired by something that Norway does in other cities around the world, and that is to erect a Christmas tree as a gift to the whole country as a thank you for the assistance received in World War II", and that "it started with this holiday tree...and evolved into a large cultural festival." In addition to three concerts, there was an exhibition on Lofoten and Norwegian food available at Union Station's Center Café.

=== 2010s ===
In 2013, the Christmas tree was decorated with 20,000 lights, the flags of each country, and 700 ornaments depicting The Scream by Norwegian Edvard Munch. According to Ambassador Kåre R. Aas, the "collection of ornaments symbolizes all the angst in preparing for an excellent Christmas." It was also a way to recognize the 150th anniversary of Munch's birth. After the tree was taken down, the ornaments were donated. In 2014, the tree was decorated with ornaments of polar bears as a way of bringing attention to climate change. Aas said "We are seeing an increased emphasis on climate issues, and Norway is working closely with the U.S. on climate issues." That year Senator Amy Klobuchar was chosen to light the tree.

=== 2020s ===
The 25th anniversary of a Christmas tree being donated took place in 2022. Amongst the events taking place that year included music by Wicked Sycamore, Rayshun LaMarr, East of the River Steelband, and TenThing. Amongst the speakers at the lighting ceremony were Ambassador Anniken Krutnes, an official from the Norwegian-American Chamber of Commerce, and the president of Washington Performing Arts. During the 2023 ceremony, Hill Rag reporter Elizabeth O'Gorek noted it had become "one of Washington's most popular holiday traditions."

== See also ==
- Capitol Christmas Tree
- National Christmas Tree (United States)
- Norway–United States relations
- White House Christmas tree
