= The Smile Machine =

1992 art work created by Dick Turner

The Smile Machine is an art work created in 1992 by the artist Dick Turner. The idea was later used without the artist's authorization for an advertising campaign during the Winter Olympics in Lillehammer, Norway in 1994. This led to a dispute involving the Embassy of Norway in Washington, D.C. and the Lillehammer Olympic Organizing Committee.

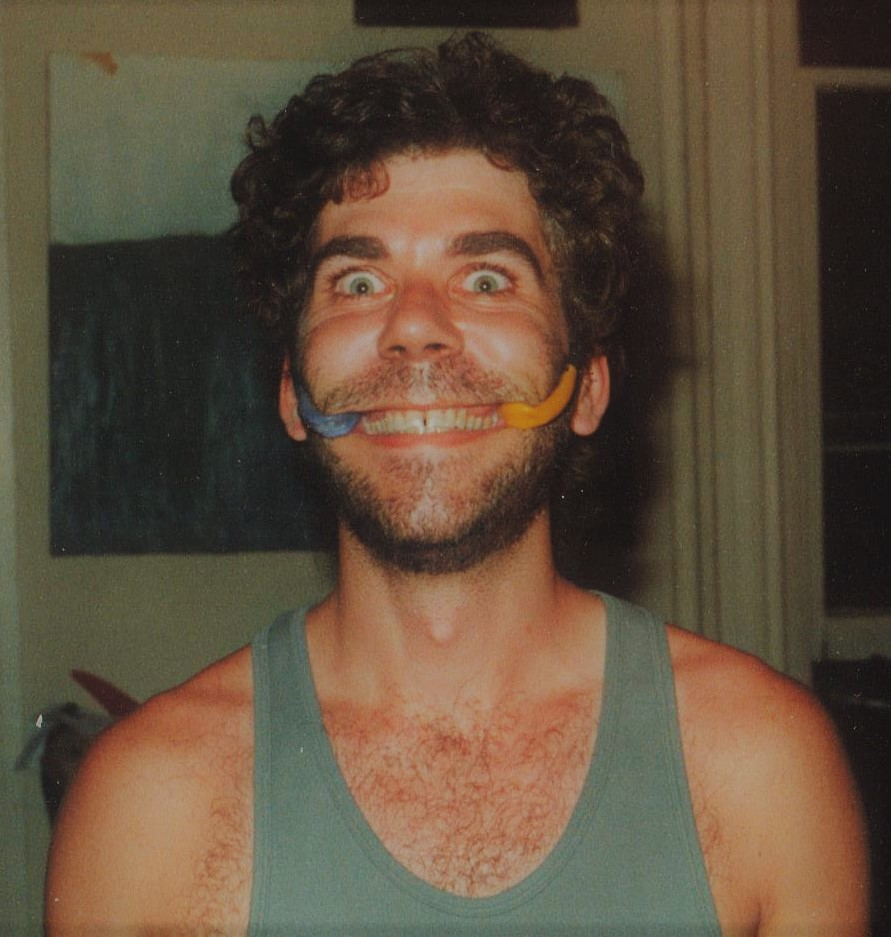
The Smile Machine

== History ==
The Smile Machine consists of two plastic hooks (sustaining rods) connected by two lengths of elastic (the joy strap) which are held together by a plastic buckle (the calibration buckle). They come with "The Thirty Points of Ideaism", a series of 30 precepts meant to be read while wearing The Smile Machine. After completing the piece, Turner then took out advertisements once a week in November 1992 in The Village Voice.

== Dispute with Lillehammer Olympic Organizing Committee ==
In December 1993, Turner discovered that the Lillehammer Olympic Organizing Committee had begun to use his work as part of its promotion effort for the Lillehammer Winter Olympic Games. They had made 100,000 of them using their promotional budget of 120,000 dollars. The work appeared in both Newsweek and Life Magazine and was the subject of a presentation on National Public Radio, but Turner was given no credit as its inventor. Turner then contacted the Embassy of Norway in Washington, D.C. and threatened legal action. Turner was then interviewed by the Norwegian tabloid VG where his claims were put before the Norwegian people. Finally Press Counsellor Tore Tanum of the Norwegian Embassy publicly recognized Turner as the work's creator.

== Other appearances ==
- Turner has used the work during different performances such as "The Secular Miracle" at the Pompidou Center in Paris in 2005, and "How to Make a Smile Machine" in Paris in 2013.
- Turner made a "commercial" for it in 2014.
- The work appeared in the film Nature Morte avec des Oranges in 2016.
- The work was the subject of an article in Brain Magazine in Paris, France.
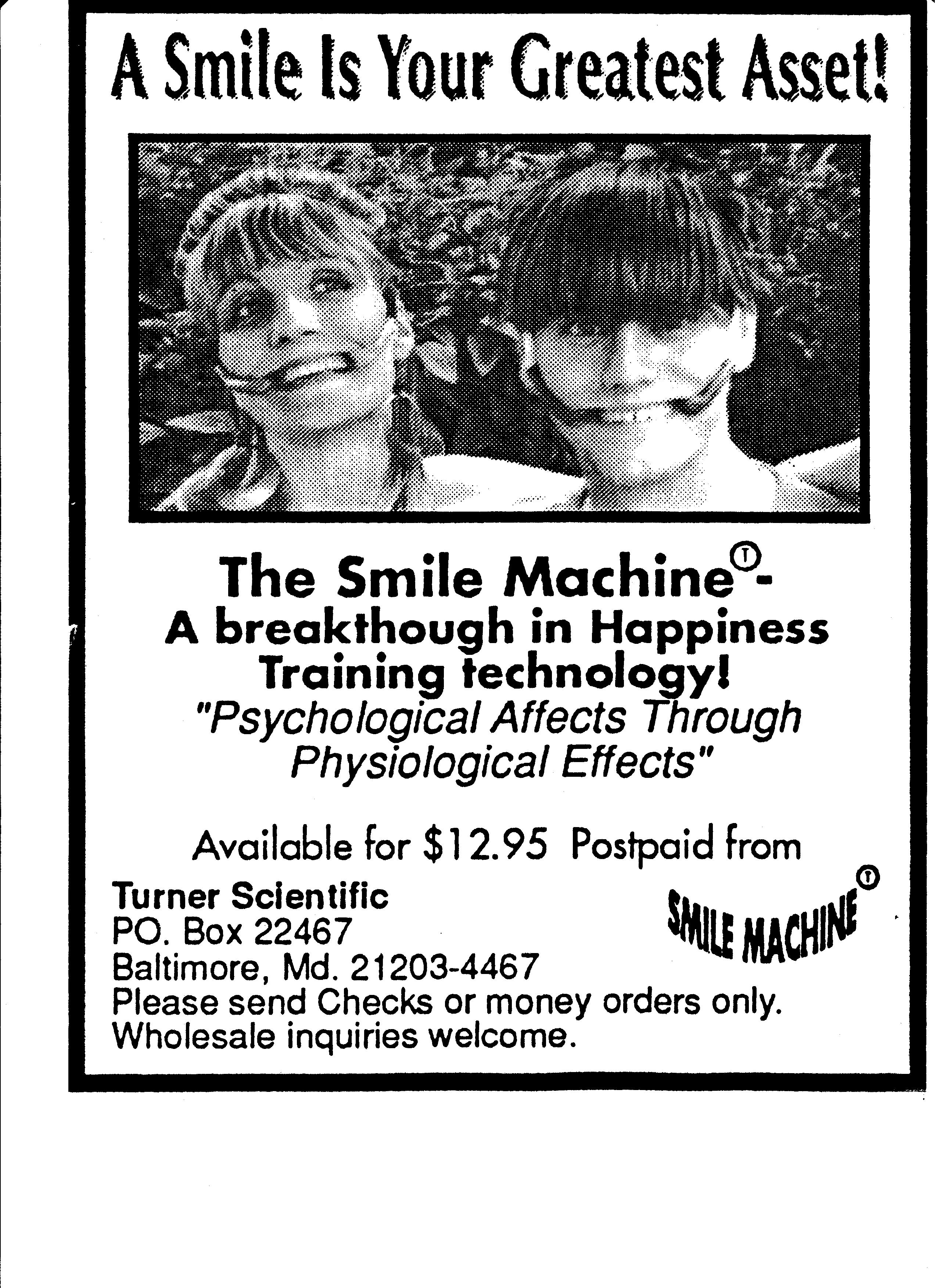
The artwork used to announce the Smile Machine in 1992.
