= Reginald Norby =

Norwegian diplomat

Reginald Semb Norby (21 May 1934 – 6 December 2012) was a Norwegian diplomat.

He was born in Lillesand, and took officer training before enrolling in cand.philol. studies. He graduated in 1960, and worked as a teacher at Drammen Commerce School before being hired in the Norwegian Ministry of Foreign Affairs in 1963. He served abroad in Bonn, West Berlin, Ottawa, Paris and Helsinki and at home as assistant secretary and head of department.

He was promoted to deputy under-secretary of state in 1989, and served as the Norwegian ambassador to France from 1994. He was due to be replaced by Knut Vollebæk in 1997, but as Vollebæk became Minister of Foreign Affairs, Norby remained in France to 1998. He was then the ambassador to Finland to 2001. He was also a member of Koordineringsrådet for sivilt beredskap from 1989 to 1994, having been a deputy member since 1985. In Bærum Municipality, he was a minor ballot candidate for the Conservative Party in local elections.

Norby was decorated, among others, as a Commander of the Order of St. Olav and a Knight, Grand Cross of the Order of the Lion of Finland. He resided in Sandvika, where he died in December 2012.

Diplomatic posts
Preceded by Arne Langeland	Norwegian ambassador to France; 1994–1998	Succeeded by Rolf Trolle Andersen
