= Per Martin Ølberg =

Norwegian diplomat and politician

- Born: January 17, 1933; Lier, Norway
- Died: May 2, 2004 (aged 71)
- Occupation: Politician
- Years active: 1988-1993

Per Martin Ølberg (17 January 1933 – 2 May 2004) was a Norwegian diplomat and politician for the Labour Party.

He was born in Lier, and took the cand.mag. degree in his education. He started working for the Norwegian Ministry of Foreign Affairs in 1958, and was an embassy counsellor in the United States from 1973 to 1976. He then served as State Secretary in the Ministry of Trade from 1976 to 1981, in Nordli's Cabinet and Brundtland's First Cabinet. He was then the Norwegian ambassador to Canada from 1982 to 1987, to West Germany/Germany from 1988 to 1993 and to the OECD from 1993 to 1997.

Diplomatic posts
Preceded by Sverre Gjellum	Norwegian ambassador to West Germany; 1988–1990	Succeeded by position abolished
Preceded by position created	Norwegian ambassador to Germany; 1990–1993	Succeeded by Kjell Eliassen
