= Sverre Gjellum =

Norwegian diplomat (1919–1999)

Sverre Julius Gjellum (29 September 1919 – 23 April 1999) was a Norwegian diplomat.

He was born in Kristiania, enrolled in law studies in 1939 and graduated from the University of Oslo with the cand.jur. degree in 1943. This was during the occupation of Norway by Nazi Germany, and he escaped to neutral Sweden, joined the Norwegian police troops-in-exile before travelling via the United Kingdom to Canada, where he underwent pilot training in Little Norway. In 1945 he returned to Norway and worked with the legal purge in the Oslo police. He started working for the Ministry of Foreign Affairs in 1946.

His first posts abroad were as an embassy secretary in Mexico and vice-consul in San Francisco, California. He returned to Norway in 1953. He was a deputy under-secretary of state in the Ministry of Foreign Affairs from 1965 to 1969, Norwegian ambassador in Kenya from 1969 to 1972, permanent under-secretary of state (the highest-ranking bureaucratic position) in the Ministry of Foreign Affairs from 1972 to 1977, Norwegian ambassador to the European Community in Brussels from 1977 to 1982 and to West Germany from 1982 to 1987. He was decorated as a Commander with Star of the Order of St. Olav in 1974.

In his last years he worked for the Salvation Army. He died in April 1999 and was buried at Vestre gravlund.

Civic offices
Preceded by Thore Albert Boye	Permanent under-secretary of state in the Norwegian Ministry of Foreign Affairs; 1972–1977	Succeeded by Georg Kristiansen
Diplomatic posts
Preceded by Rolf Trygve Busch	Norwegian ambassador to West Germany; 1982–1987	Succeeded by Per Martin Ølberg
