= Norway–United States relations =

- Norway: United States

Diplomatic mission
- Royal Norwegian Embassy, Washington, D.C.: United States Embassy, Oslo

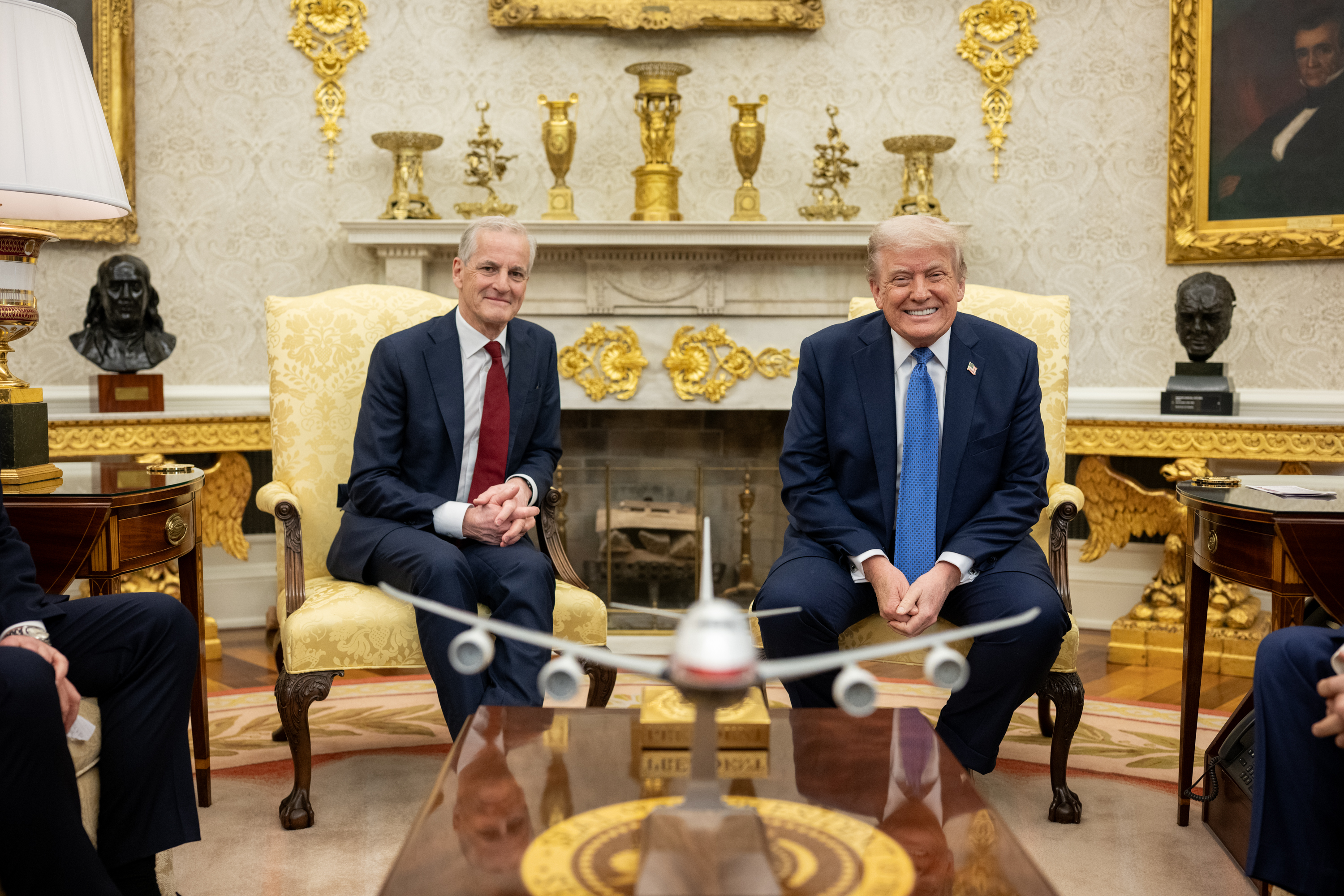
Prime Minister Jonas Gahr Støre holds talks with U.S. president Donald Trump at the White House.

The United States and Norway have a very long tradition of positive relations.

The American Revolution of 1776 had a profound impact on Norway, and the democratic ideals of the United States Constitution served as a model for the authors of Norway's own Constitution of 1814, including Christian Magnus Falsen. The close relationship between the two nations was reinforced by massive Norwegian emigration to the U.S. during the period 1825–1940, when more than 850,000 Norwegians made new homes in the United States and helped build the nation.

After the liberation from German occupation in 1945, Norway abandoned its history of neutrality and joined NATO, stressing its military alliance and economic cooperation with Britain and the United States. The Marshall Plan helped Norway to modernize its economy and integrate more into the world market. It avoided any provocation that might offend the Soviet Union, its northern neighbor. Since the 1960s, Norway has been drawn increasingly into European affairs while the importance of ties to Britain and the United States has declined. Norway refuses to join the European Union, and engages in a largely independent foreign policy. There is a lingering desire for nonalignment, strengthened by the discovery of vast amounts of oil, that built up a huge rainy day fund in the treasury.

The friendly state of the bilateral relationship was reinforced when former King Harald V of Norway hosted the visit of U.S. president Bill Clinton in November 1999, the first visit to Norway by a U.S. president in office. The relations between Norway and the United States, and the Mission in Oslo focus its efforts on projects that serve mutual interests. Among them are expanding on the success of NATO in securing transatlantic security, promoting new business opportunities between the two nations, working with the Arctic Council to preserve the Arctic environment and with Russia in particular in the Barents Sea, helping the Baltic nations to find their place in the new Europe, and capitalizing on information technology to promote human rights and a sense of world community.

According to the 2012 U.S. Global Leadership Report, 46% of Norwegians approve of U.S. leadership, with 21% disapproving and 33% uncertain.

== Resident diplomatic missions ==
of Norway in the United States

- Washington, D.C. (Embassy)
- New York City (Consulate-General)
- San Francisco (Consulate-General)

of the United States in Norway

- Oslo (Embassy)

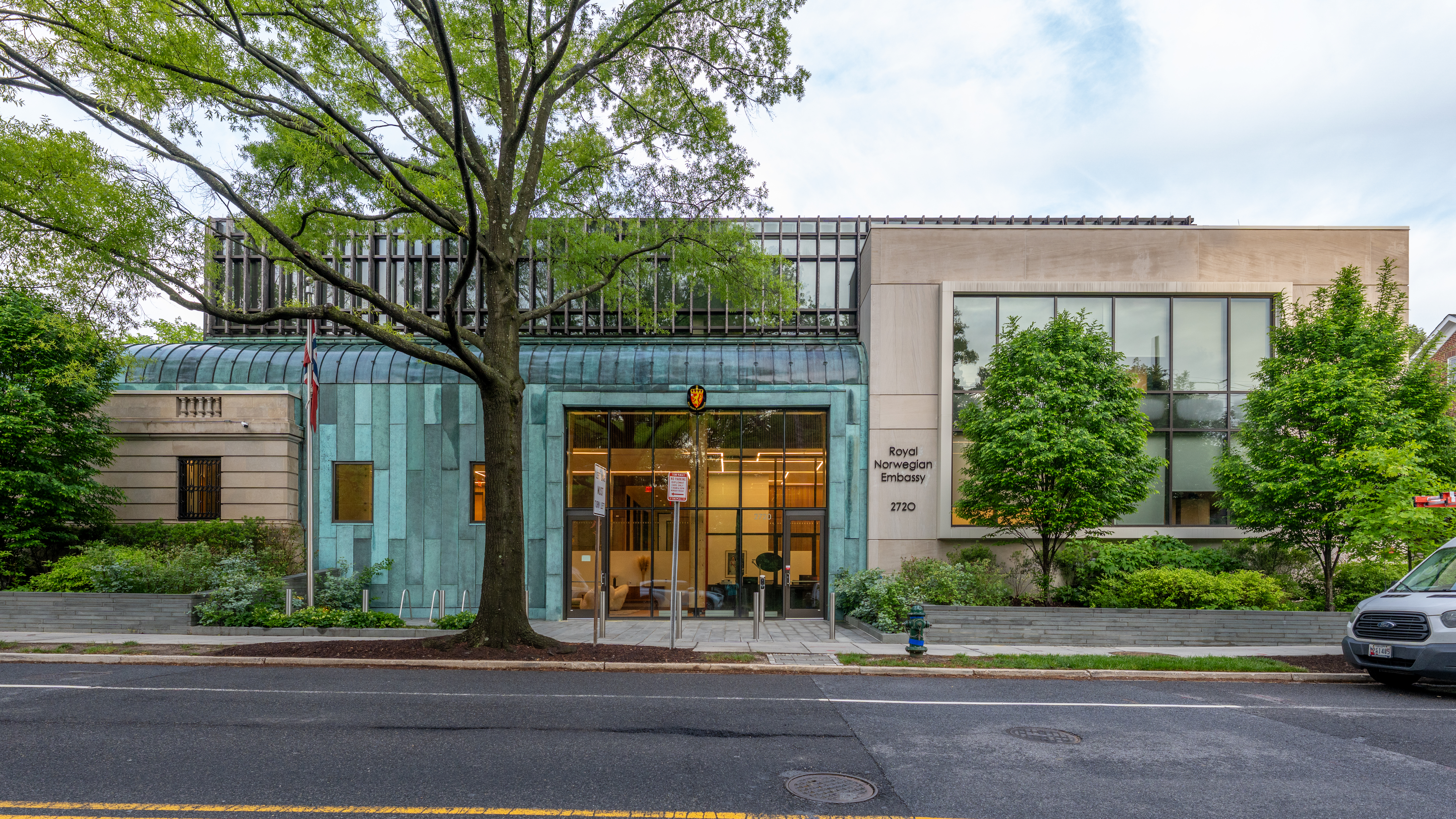
Embassy of Norway in Washington, D.C.

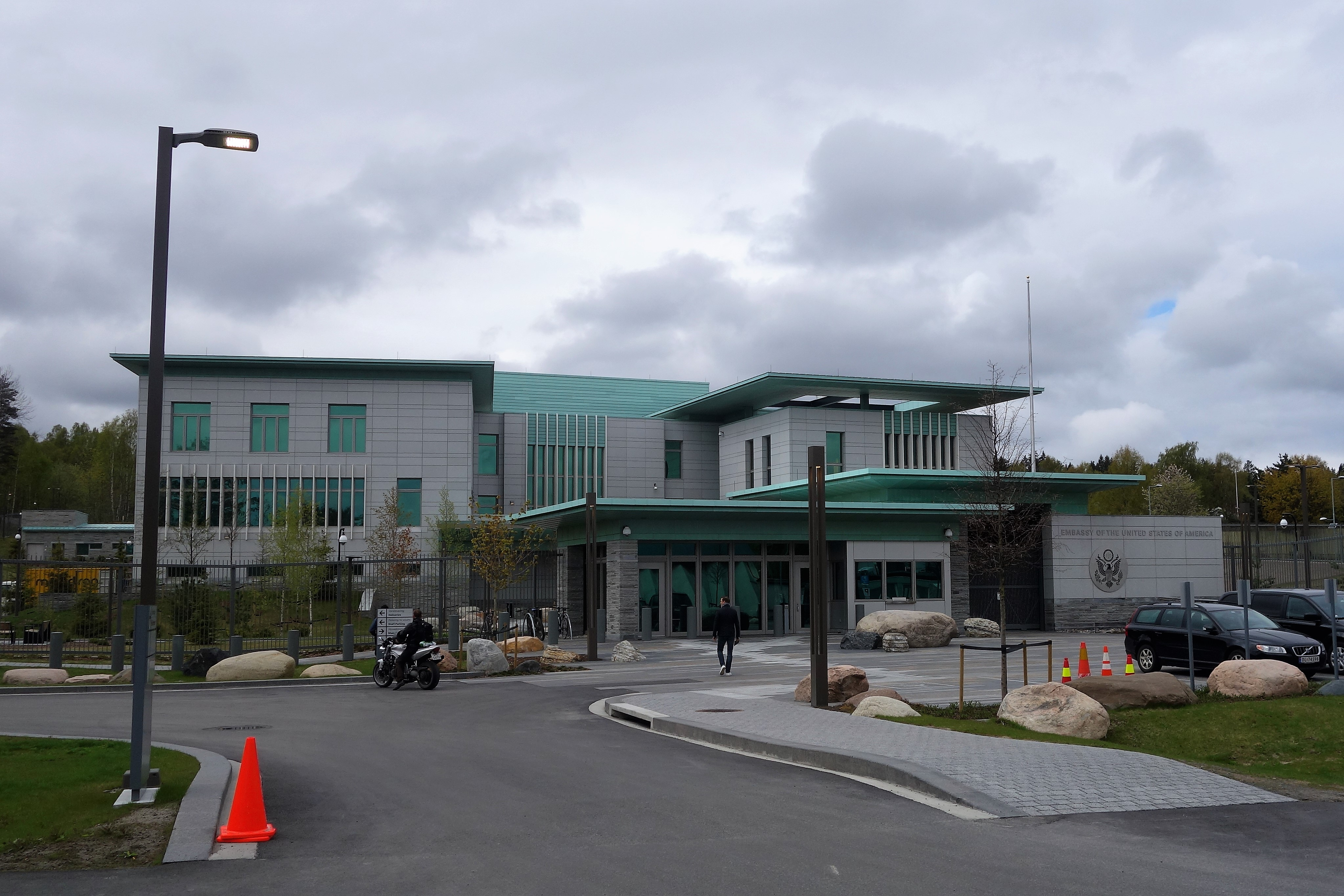
Embassy of the United States in Oslo

== Norwegian Americans ==
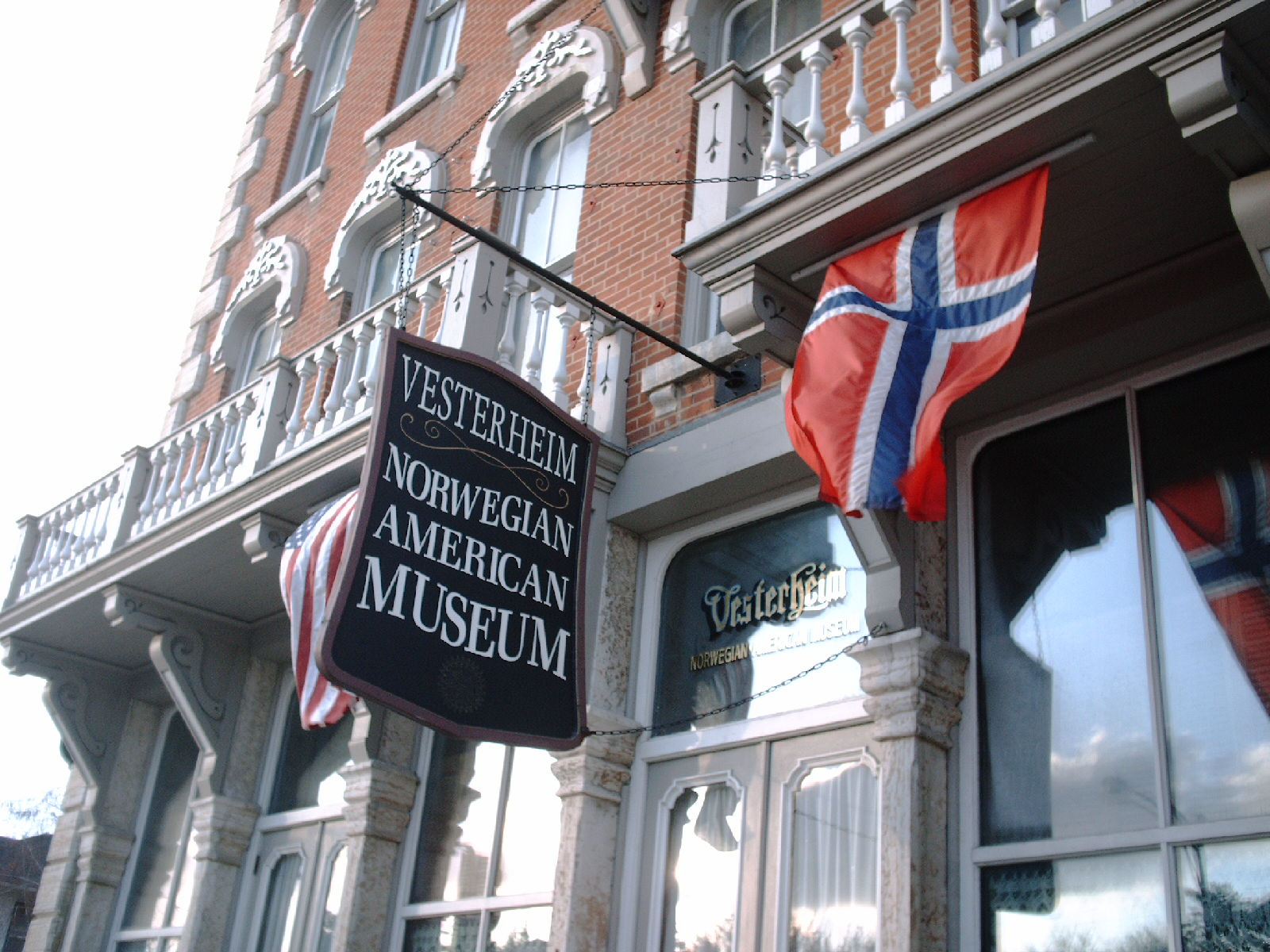
Vesterheim Norwegian-American Museum

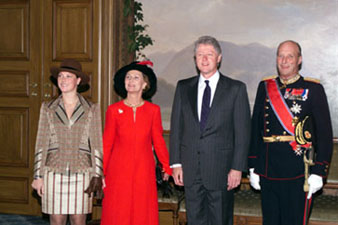
U.S. President Bill Clinton with the Norwegian royal family in 1999

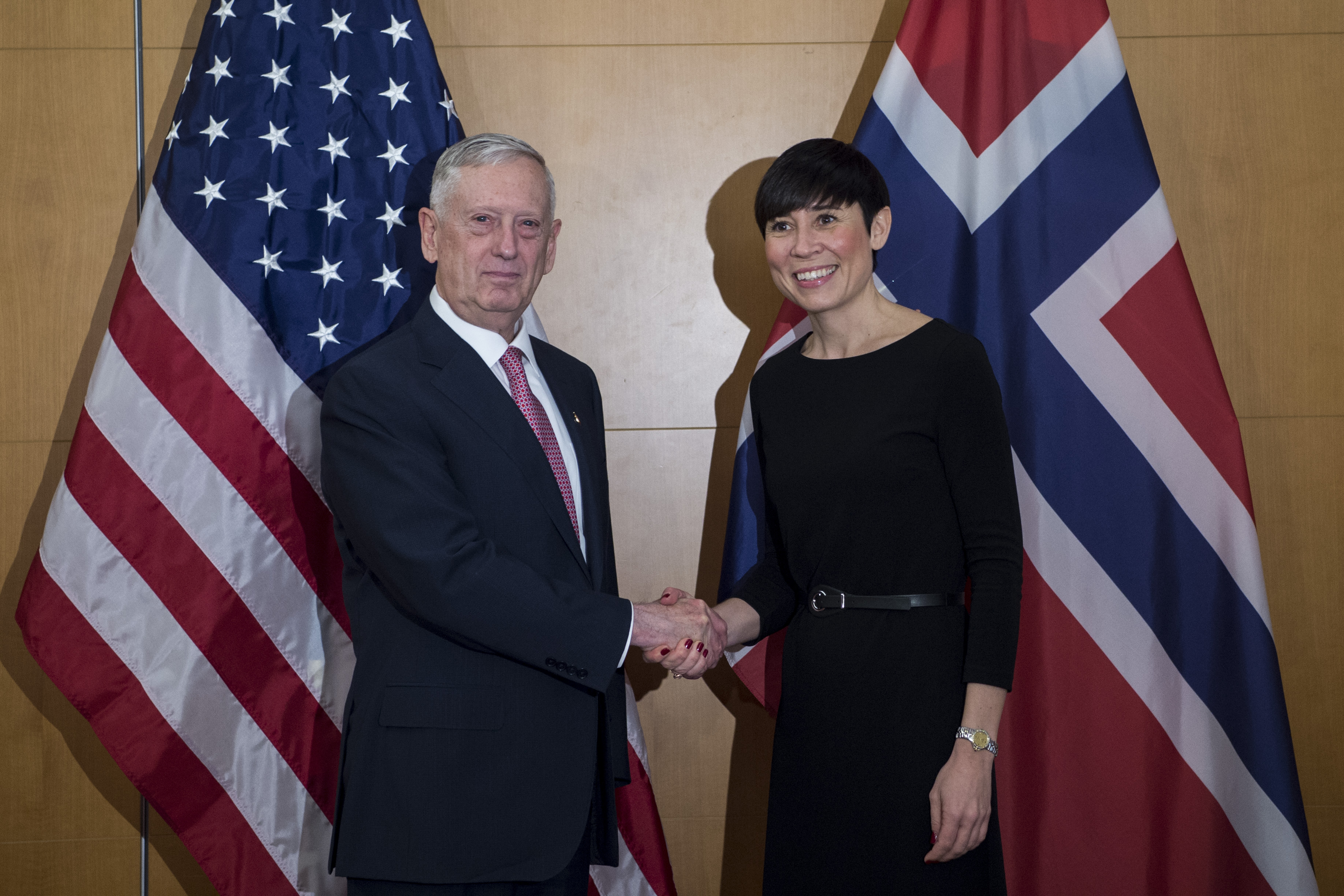
Secretary Jim Mattis with Minister Ine Marie Eriksen Søreide, 2017

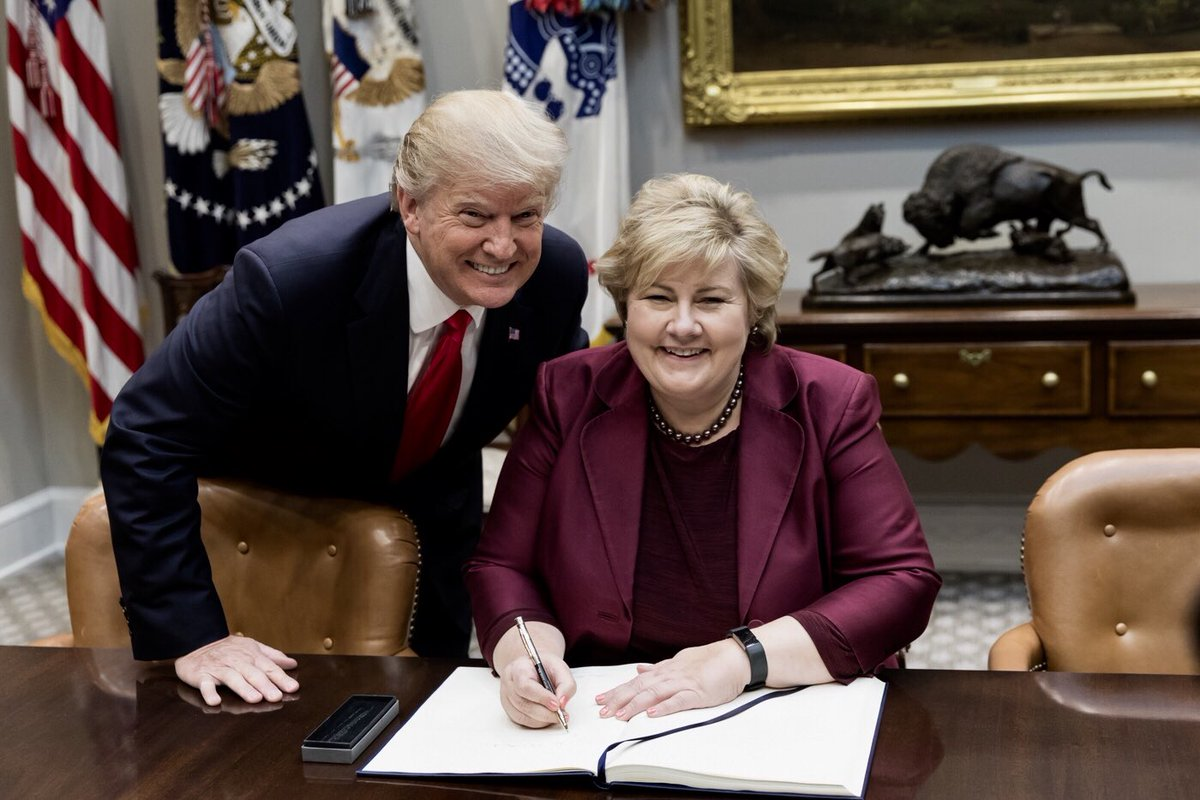
President Donald Trump and Prime Minister Erna Solberg in 2018

There are more than 4.5 million people of Norwegian ancestry in the United States today.^{[1]} Of these, approximately three million claim "Norwegian" as their sole or primary ancestry.

- A little more than 2% of whites in the United States are of Norwegian descent. In the Upper Midwest, especially Minnesota, western Wisconsin, northern Iowa, and the Dakotas, more than 15% of whites are of Norwegian descent. Nearly one-third of all North Dakotans claim Norwegian as their ancestry.
- 55% of Norwegian Americans live in the Midwest, although a large number (21%) live in the Pacific States of Washington, Oregon, and California.
- Norwegian Americans actively celebrate and maintain their heritage in many ways. Much of it centers on the Lutheran-Evangelical churches they were born into, but also culinary customs (lutefisk and lefse), costumes (bunad), and Norwegian holidays (Syttende Mai, May 17) are popular. A number of towns in the United States, particularly in the Upper Midwest, display very strong Norwegian influences.
- Although the Norwegians were the most numerous of all the Scandinavian immigrant groups, other Scandinavians also emigrated to America during the same time period. Today, there are 11–12 million Americans of Scandinavian ancestry. Scandinavian descendants represent about 6% of the white population in the United States as a whole, and more than 25% of the white population of the Upper Midwest.
- Norwegian Americans tend to be Lutheran (Norwegian-American Lutheranism), although substantial minorities are Roman Catholic or belong to other Protestant denominations.
- There are more people of Norwegian ancestry in America than in Norway. Historically high birth rates over the past hundred years among Norwegian Americans resulted in their roughly quadrupling in population over the original 850,000 immigrants.

== Norwegian consulates in the United States ==
=== Minneapolis ===
In 1906 Norway opened a consulate in Minneapolis, Minnesota. It became a consulate-general in 1946. In 2001 the Norwegian government planned to close the consulate but it stayed open after Norwegian American groups lobbied to keep it open. In 2007 the Norwegian government again announced plans to close the consulate and replace it with an honorary consulate; area Norwegian Americans criticized the outcome.

The Minneapolis consulate served Minnesota, Iowa, Michigan, Montana, Nebraska, North Dakota, South Dakota, and Wisconsin. In 2007 there were 850,000 people of Norwegian descent in Minnesota. In 2007 the consulate had four permanent employees and an intern.

In 2007, former U.S. Vice President Walter Mondale agreed to serve as Honorary Consul General. He was succeeded by Gary Gandrud whose grandfather P.A. Gandrud had served in both the House of Representatives and Senate in the Minnesota legislature. As of 2015 Eivind Heiberg, the CEO of Sons of Norway, is the honorary consul of Minneapolis.

=== Miami ===
There was previously a Norwegian consulate in Miami that served Florida, Alabama, Georgia, North Carolina, South Carolina, and the Caribbean. The consulate closed on April 1, 2003. After its closure its territory was divided between the consulates in Houston, New York, Caracas, and Mexico City.

== See also ==
- Foreign relations of Norway
- Foreign relations of the United States
- Marine Corps Prepositioning Program-Norway
- Norwegian Christmas Tree in Washington, D.C.
