= Crown Princess Märtha =

Statue in Washington, D.C., U.S.

- Artist: Kirsten Kokkin
- Year: 2005
- Type: Bronze
- Location: Washington, D.C., United States; 38.924552°N 77.066624°W
- Owner: Government of Norway

Crown Princess Märtha is a bronze statue of Crown Princess Märtha of Norway, by Kirsten Kokkin.

It is located at the Norwegian residence at Massachusetts Avenue and 34th Street, N.W. Washington, D.C. It was unveiled 18 September 2005. A copy at Palace Park Oslo, was unveiled by King Harald V of Norway on 21 February 2007, on his 70th birthday. A third specimen was unveiled at the Norwegian Church in Stockholm on 30 October 2008.

== See also ==
- List of public art in Washington, D.C., Ward 2
