= Georg Kristiansen =

Norwegian military officer and diplomat

Georg Kristiansen (4 March 1917 – 24 August 2003) was a Norwegian military officer and diplomat.

He was born in Kristiania, and after finishing his secondary education in 1935 he studied languages and history before taking a military education. He attended the Norwegian Military Academy-in-exile (in London) and became an officer in 1943. He actively served as a captain until 1945, and was decorated with the Defence Medal 1940–1945. He was hired in the Ministry of Foreign Affairs in 1946. He was an attaché and embassy secretary in France from 1947 to 1952 before returning to Norway. He was promoted to assistant secretary in 1952, sub-director in 1959 and deputy under-secretary of state in 1962. In between he was a head teacher at the Norwegian National Defence College from 1957 to 1959.

He served as the Norwegian ambassador to NATO and OECD in Paris from 1963 to 1967, and to NATO in Brussels from 1967 to 1970. He was then the director of the Directorate for Civil Protection and Emergency Planning from 1970 to 1974, ambassador to the OECD from 1974 to 1977 and the permanent under-secretary of state in the Ministry of Foreign Affairs from 1977 to 1980. From 1980 to 1985 he was Norwegian the ambassador to France.

He was decorated as a Commander with Star of the Order of St. Olav in 1980. He settled in Lillehammer after his retirement, and chaired Oplandske Dampskibsselskap for a period. He was also a member of the Nygaard Haug Committee, a predecessor of the Lund Commission, from 1993 to 1994. This was not uncontroversial because of his career ties to military intelligence. He died in August 2003.

Civic offices
Preceded by	Director of the Directorate for Civil Protection and Emergency Planning; 1970–1974	Succeeded by
Preceded by Sverre Gjellum	Permanent under-secretary of state in the Ministry of Foreign Affairs; 1977–1980	Succeeded by Kjell Eliassen
Diplomatic posts
Preceded by Hersleb Vogt	Norwegian ambassador to France; 1980–1985	Succeeded by Asbjørn Skarstein
