= Rolf Trygve Busch =

Norwegian diplomat (1920–2016)

Rolf Trygve Busch (15 November 1920 – 18 December 2016) was a Norwegian diplomat and ambassador.

He was born at Spydeberg in Østfold, Norway. He was the son of Aksel Busch (1887-1948) and Alette Tunby (1885–1977). He was awarded his cand.jur. degree from the University of Oslo in 1946. He was hired in the Ministry of Foreign Affairs in 1947, and was promoted to assistant secretary in 1960 and sub-director in 1963. He served as an embassy counsellor at the Norwegian NATO embassy from 1965 to 1971, deputy under-secretary of state in the Ministry of Foreign Affairs briefly in 1971 before serving as the Norwegian ambassador to NATO from 1971 to 1977, to West Germany from 1977 to 1982 and to the United Kingdom from 1982 to 1989.

Diplomatic posts
Preceded by Einar-Fredrik Ofstad	Norwegian Ambassador to West Germany; 1977–1982	Succeeded by Sverre Gjellum
Preceded by Frithjof Jacobsen	Norwegian Ambassador to the United Kingdom; 1982–1989	Succeeded by Kjell Eliassen
