= Einar-Fredrik Ofstad =

Norwegian diplomat (1916–1998)

Einar-Fredrik Ofstad (6 May 1916 – 15 February 1998) was a Norwegian diplomat.

He was born in Rjukan, and after taking the examen artium he studied at Cambridge University for a period and participated as an officer in the Norwegian Campaign in Voss in 1940, before graduating with the cand.jur. degree in law in 1941. He was a police superintendent in Bergen from 1941 to 1942, worked in the National Insurance Administration from 1942 to 1943 at the same time as he participated in the Norwegian resistance to German occupation. He had to flee to Sweden in 1944, and continued to England where he served in the Norwegian High Command and the Ministry of Defence-in-exile. He was decorated with the Defence Medal 1940–1945.

He was hired in the Ministry of Foreign Affairs in 1946. He served as an Attaché in the United Kingdom from 1946 to 1948, Vice-Consul in Chicago from 1948 to 1951 and secretary in the Ministry of Foreign Affairs from 1951 to 1953. He was a First Secretary in Turkey and the Netherlands before working as Head of Division in the Ministry of Foreign Affairs from 1960 to 1964, Counsellor in West Germany from 1964 to 1968, Deputy Director General in the Ministry of Foreign Affairs from 1968 to 1971 and Director General from 1971 to 1973. He served as the Norwegian ambassador to West Germany from 1973 to 1977 and Austria from 1977 to 1984.

He was decorated as a Commander of the Order of St. Olav, and held the honorary token of the Norwegian Red Cross. He was a Roman Catholic, and a Knight of the Sovereign Military Order of Malta from 1977. He died in 1998.

Diplomatic posts
Preceded by Søren Christian Sommerfelt	Norwegian ambassador to West Germany; 1973–1977	Succeeded by Rolf Trygve Busch
