= Arne Langeland =

Norwegian jurist, civil servant, and diplomat (1928–2019)

Arne Langeland (24 November 1928 – 15 December 2019) was a Norwegian jurist, civil servant and diplomat.

Arne Langeland was born in Nøtterøy Municipality, and was a cand.jur. by education. He was hired in the Ministry of Foreign Affairs in 1953, and was promoted to subdirector in 1963. From 1965 to 1970 he served as counsellor to the embassy in Geneva. After an intermezzo working as a lawyer, he returned to diplomacy in 1976 as Vice Secretary General of the European Free Trade Association. He was then appointed deputy under-secretary of state in the Ministry of Trade in 1978, and was permanent under-secretary of state from 1981 to 1982. Then, following six years as CEO of the Norwegian Confederation of Trade Unions, he was appointed Norwegian ambassador to France in 1988. He stayed in this position until 1993, then as Norwegian ambassador to the Netherlands from 1994 to 1996.

Langeland died on 15 December 2019, at the age of 91.

Diplomatic posts
Preceded by Asbjørn Skarstein	Norwegian ambassador to France; 1988–1993	Succeeded by Reginald Norby
