= Søren Christian Sommerfelt (diplomat) =

Norwegian diplomat

Søren Christian Sommerfelt (9 May 1916 – 14 December 2003) was a Norwegian diplomat.

He was born in Kristiania as a son of Søren Christian Sommerfelt (1877–1965) and Sigrid Nicolaysen (1879–1976). He was a great-grandson of Søren Christian Sommerfelt and grandnephew of Adam Hiorth, Halfdan, Christian and Karl Linné Sommerfelt. In 1947 he married Frances Bull Ely.

He held the cand.jur. degree, and started working for the Ministry of Foreign Affairs in 1941. He was promoted to assistant secretary in 1952 and deputy under-secretary of state in 1956. He served as Norwegian ambassador to The United Nations in Geneva, Switzerland from 1960, West Germany from 1968, the United States from 1973 and Italy to 1978 to 1981. From 1970 to 1972 he led the Norwegian delegation that negotiated possible EEC membership. He was a member of the gentlemen's skiing club SK Fram since 1970. He died in December 2003 in Middleburg, Virginia.

Diplomatic posts
Preceded by Paul Koht	Norwegian ambassador to West Germany; 1968–1973	Succeeded by Einar-Fredrik Ofstad
Preceded by Arne Christian Gunneng	Norwegian ambassador to the United States; 1973–1978	Succeeded by Knut Hedemann
