= Rudolf Hedemann =

Norwegian politician

Rudolf Hedemann (12 March 1889 – 18 November 1978) was a Norwegian politician for the Labour Party.

He was born in Stange as a son of railway foreman Reinhart Hedemann (1854-1937). He was married to Kristiane Bjørgås (1896–1964), and was the father of Knut and Reidar Hedemann. Reidar was for some time married to Berit Monsen, a sister of Per Monsen and daughter of Fredrik Monsen.

He attended railway school, and advanced through the ranks in the Norwegian State Railways as a station clerk and telegrapher. He was finally the station master of Hjellum Station from 1934 to 1950. During the occupation of Norway by Nazi Germany he was arrested twice. The first time he was imprisoned from 23 to 27 March 1942. The second time he was arrested on 15 October 1944, and imprisoned in Victoria Terrasse, Åkebergveien and Berg concentration camp to the occupation's end in May 1945.

In Vang, he chaired the school board from 1929, and was the mayor of Vang Municipality from 1931 to 1965. He was the county council chairman of Hedmark from 1948 to 1963 and the first county mayor of Hedmark from 1963 to 1967. He chaired the Norwegian Association of Rural Municipalities from 1946 to 1960. Hedemann was also a minor ballot candidate in parliamentary elections of 1927, 1930 and 1933 without being elected.

Hedemann was involved in the regional electricity institutions. He was a board member of Hamar, Vang og Furnes Kommunale Kraftselskap (HVF) from 1935 to 1967. In 1946 he became chair of the supervisory council in Vinstra Kraftselskap. In 1952 he became deputy chair of the supervisory council in Øvre Vinstra Kraftlag, representing HVF, but already in 1953 HVF was no longer a part of this organization. Hedemann was also a member of the local board of Vinmonopolet and a council member of the Norwegian State Housing Bank. In 1966 he was decorated as a Knight, First Class of the Order of St. Olav.

Political offices
| New office | County mayor of Hedmark; 1963–1967 | Succeeded by Bjørn Bakke |
