= Kjeld Vibe =

Norwegian diplomat (1927–2011)

Kjeld Vibe (5 October 1927 – 27 January 2011) was a Norwegian diplomat.

Born in Stavanger, and was a cand.jur. by education. He started working for the Norwegian Ministry of Foreign Affairs in 1955, and served as embassy counsellor in the United States from 1965 to 1969, before becoming sub-director in the Ministry of Foreign Affairs. He was promoted to deputy under-secretary of state in 1972, served as NATO ambassador from 1977 to 1984, then five years as permanent under-secretary of state. From 1989 to 1996 he was the Norwegian ambassador to the United States. He was decorated as a Commander with Star of the Order of St. Olav in 1985.

Civic offices
Preceded by Kjell Eliassen	Permanent under-secretary of state in the Norwegian Ministry of Foreign Affairs; 1984–1989	Succeeded by Helge Vindenes
Diplomatic posts
Preceded by Kjell Eliassen	Norwegian ambassador to the United States; 1989–1996	Succeeded by Tom Vraalsen
