= Tom Vraalsen =

Norwegian politician (1936–2021)

Norwegian Ambassador to the United States
- In office 2 October 1996 – 17 April 2001
- Prime Minister: Gro Harlem Brundtland; Thorbjørn Jagland; Kjell Magne Bondevik; Jens Stoltenberg
- Preceded by: Kjeld Vibe
- Succeeded by: Knut Vollebæk

Norwegian Ambassador to the United Kingdom
- In office 18 February 1994 – 1 October 1996
- Prime Minister: Gro Harlem Brundtland
- Preceded by: Kjell Eliassen
- Succeeded by: Kjell Colding

Norwegian Permanent Representative to the United Nations
- In office 12 March 1982 – 16 October 1989
- Prime Minister: Kåre Willoch; Gro Harlem Brundtland
- Preceded by: Ole Ålgård
- Succeeded by: Thorvald Stoltenberg

Minister of International Development
- In office 16 October 1989 – 3 November 1990
- Prime Minister: Jan P. Syse
- Preceded by: Kirsti Kolle Grøndahl
- Succeeded by: Grete Faremo

Minister of Nordic Cooperation
- In office 16 October 1989 – 3 November 1990
- Prime Minister: Jan P. Syse
- Preceded by: Bjarne Mørk-Eidem
- Succeeded by: Kjell Borgen

Personal details
- Born: Tom Eric Vraalsen; 26 January 1936 Oslo, Norway
- Died: 13 September 2021 (aged 85)
- Party: Centre
- Spouse: Vibecke Vraalsen
- Children: 5

Tom Eric Vraalsen (26 January 1936 – 13 September 2021) was a Norwegian ambassador and politician for the Centre Party. He served as the Norwegian Minister of International Development from 1989 to 1990, as well as Minister of Nordic Cooperation.

He received a master's degree in economics from the University of Århus, Denmark, before joining the Norwegian Foreign Service in 1960. He was the Norwegian Ambassador to the United Kingdom of Great Britain and Northern Ireland from 1994 to 1996, to the United States of America from 1996 to 2001 and to Finland from 2001 to 2003. He received an Honorary Doctorate Degree from the Augustana College Commencement in Sioux Falls, South Dakota on 21 May 2000.

Vraalsen was also the Permanent Representative & Ambassador of Norway to the United Nations from 1982 to 1989. From 1998 to 2004, he held the position of the UN Secretary-General's Special Envoy for Humanitarian affairs for the Sudan. He is the author of numerous papers an articles on African socio-economic development issues and on conflict prevention and resolution, including two books on the UN, The UN - Dream and Reality (1984) and UN in Focus (1975), which he co-authored.

He was also chairman of Task Force for International Cooperation on Holocaust Education, Remembrance, and Research under the Norwegian Chairmanship 2009–2010.

He was married and has five children.

Diplomatic posts
Preceded by Ole Ålgård	Permanent Representative of Norway to the United Nations; 1981–1989	Succeeded by Thorvald Stoltenberg
Preceded by Kjell Eliassen	Norwegian Ambassador to the United Kingdom; 1994–1996	Succeeded by Kjell Colding
Preceded by Kjeld Vibe	Norwegian Ambassador to the United States; 1996–2001	Succeeded by Knut Vollebæk
