= Arne Christian Gunneng =

Norwegian diplomat (1914–1989)

Arne Christian Gunneng (1 December 1914 – 8 March 1989) was a Norwegian diplomat.

He was born in Kristiania, and was a cand.jur. by education. He started working for the Norwegian Ministry of Foreign Affairs in 1945, and served as the Norwegian ambassador to Canada from 1955 to 1959 before being the permanent under-secretary of state in the Ministry of Foreign Affairs from 1959 to 1961. He served as the Norwegian ambassador to Sweden from 1961 to 1966, the United States from 1966 to 1963, Italy from 1973 to 1978 and the Netherlands from 1978 to 1983.

Diplomatic posts
Preceded by Hans Engen	Norwegian ambassador to the United States; 1966–1973	Succeeded by Søren Christian Sommerfelt
