= Inger-Lise Skarstein =

Norwegian politician

Inger-Lise Skarstein, née Haug (born 6 July 1937 in Oslo) is a Norwegian politician for the Conservative Party.

She was a minor ballot candidate for the Parliament of Norway in 1973, was elected from Hordaland in 1977, and then re-elected on two occasions in 1981 and 1985.

On the local level she was a deputy member of Bergen city council from 1971 to 1975. From 1975 to 1979 she was a member of Hordaland county council.

She was the first continuity announcer in the Norwegian Broadcasting Corporation, having worked in that role from 1959 to 1965.

Her husband was Jakob Skarstein.
