= Kjell Eliassen =

Norwegian diplomat

Kjell Eliassen (18 August 1929 - 4 December 2023) was a Norwegian diplomat.

He was born in Vefsn Municipality in Northern Norway and was master of law (cand.jur.) from the University of Oslo. He worked in the Norwegian foreign service since 1953, and was secretary (from 1958 to 1960) and counsellor (from 1967 to 1970) at the Embassy of Norway in Moscow. Between 1970 and 1977 he worked in the Ministry of Foreign Affairs, arbitrating with the Soviet Union, especially about the Barents Sea and Svalbard. He later served as the Norwegian ambassador to the Socialist Federal Republic of Yugoslavia from 1977 to 1980. He was permanent under-secretary of state in the Ministry of Foreign Affairs from 1980 to 1984 and ambassador to the United States from 1984 to 1988, the United Kingdom from 1989 to 1994 and Germany from 1994 to 1998.

He was decorated as a Commander with Star of the Royal Norwegian Order of St. Olav in 1981. In 1981, he was appointed Knight Grand Cross of the Order of St Michael and St George.

Civic offices
Preceded by Georg Kristiansen	Permanent under-secretary of state in the Norwegian Ministry of Foreign Affairs; 1980–1984	Succeeded by Kjeld Vibe
Diplomatic posts
Preceded by Knut Hedemann	Norwegian Ambassador to the United States; 1984–1988	Succeeded by Kjeld Vibe
Preceded by Rolf Trygve Busch	Norwegian Ambassador to the United Kingdom; 1989–1994	Succeeded by Tom Vraalsen
Preceded by Per Martin Ølberg	Norwegian Ambassador to Germany; 1994–1998	Succeeded by Morten Wetland
