= Jakob Skarstein =

Norwegian radio personality (1921–2021)

- Born: Jakob Saethre Skarstein; 7 June 1921; Ålesund, Norway
- Died: 6 August 2021 (aged 100)
- Occupation(s): Journalist, radio presenter/personality, writer
- Spouse: Inger-Lise Skarstein

Jakob Sæthre Skarstein (7 June 1921 – 6 August 2021) was a Norwegian journalist and radio presenter/personality.

== Biography ==
He was born in Ålesund as the son of civil engineer Karl Skarstein (1892–1941) and Svanhild Sæthre (1898–1941). After taking his examen artium in 1940 he moved to Bergen in 1941, where he took miscellaneous education and jobs. He participated in the Bergens Dramatiske Klubb, illegal during the German occupation of Norway. In May 1945, when it became clear that Germany would lose World War II, Skarstein was asked to prepare free radio broadcasts to be used after the liberation. The Germans left the radio studio of Bergen— in Strandgaten—on 9 May. On that day, Skarstein's first radio broadcast took place. He was soon employed by the Norwegian Broadcasting Corporation, and spent his career at the regional office in Bergen, with short exceptions. He is especially known for the program Middagsstunden, created in 1966. During the Bergen International Festival he headed the program Festspillopper. In 1965 he married his assistant from the latter program, later television presenter and politician Inger-Lise Skarstein.

Skarstein also wrote ballads, revues, radio dramas and participated in amateur theatre. He wrote a songbook for the city of Bergen, Den nystemte, which was released in 1973 and re-released in 1993.

Skarstein celebrated his 100th birthday in June 2021 and died two months later on 6 August.
