= Asbjørn Skarstein =

Norwegian civil servant and diplomat

Norwegian Ambassador to France
- In office 1985–1988

Norwegian Ambassador to Italy
- In office 1981–1984

Personal details
- Born: 7 March 1922 Kristiania, Norway
- Died: 22 October 1999 (aged 77)
- Education: Norwegian School of Economics

Asbjørn Skarstein (7 March 1922 – 22 October 1999) was a Norwegian civil servant and diplomat.

He was born in Kristiania, and held the siv.øk. degree. He was hired in the Ministry of Foreign Affairs as an assistant secretary in 1956. He served as a councillor at the Norwegian embassies in Switzerland from 1960 and Belgium from 1962. In 1965 he returned to Norway; being a sub-director from 1965 to 1967 and deputy under-secretary of state from 1967 to 1975, both in the Ministry of Foreign Affairs. He was then the permanent under-secretary of state in the Norwegian Ministry of Trade and Shipping, the highest-ranking bureaucratic position, from 1975 to 1981. He then served as Norway's ambassador to Italy from 1981 to 1984. He also doubled as the ambassador to Malta. In 1985 Georg Kristiansen left as ambassador of France. Skarstein took over and served until 1988.

Civic offices
Preceded by	Permanent under-secretary of state in the Norwegian Ministry of Trade and Shipping; 1975–1981	Succeeded by
Diplomatic posts
Preceded by Georg Kristiansen	Norwegian ambassador to France; 1985–1988	Succeeded by Arne Langeland
