= Hans Engen =

Norwegian journalist, diplomat and politician

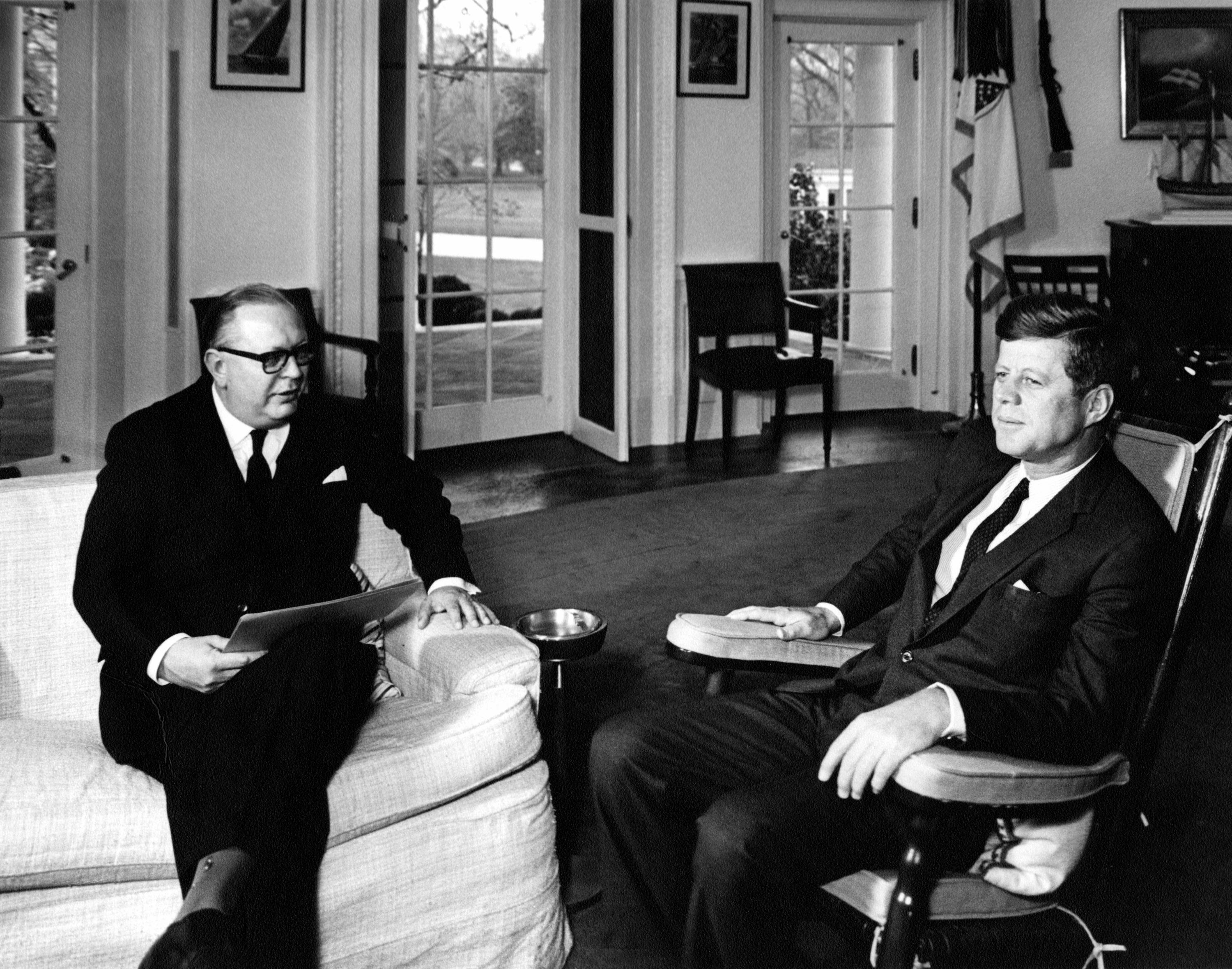
Engen (left) with John F. Kennedy (1963)

Hans Kristian Engen (22 August 1912 – 6 April 1966) was a Norwegian journalist, diplomat, and politician for the Labour Party.

He was born in Ringebu Municipality. During the German occupation of Norway from 1940 to 1945, he was a coordinator of the cooperation with the Norwegian government-in-exile and the Norwegian resistance movement. From 1946 to 1949 he worked as the foreign affairs editor of newspaper Verdens Gang.

From 1951 to 1952 he worked as Norway's counsellor of embassy at the United Nations; he was then ambassador to the UN to 1958. From 1958 to 1963, under Gerhardsen's Third Cabinet, Engen served as State Secretary in the Ministry of Foreign Affairs. Finally, he was Norwegian ambassador to the United States from 1963 to 1966.

Diplomatic posts
Preceded by Arne Sunde	Permanent Representative of Norway to the United Nations; 1952–1958	Succeeded by Sivert A. Nielsen
Preceded by Paul Gruda Koht	Norwegian ambassador to the United States; 1963–1966	Succeeded by Arne Christian Gunneng
