= Embassy of Norway, Washington, D.C. =

Diplomatic mission of the Kingdom of Norway to the United States

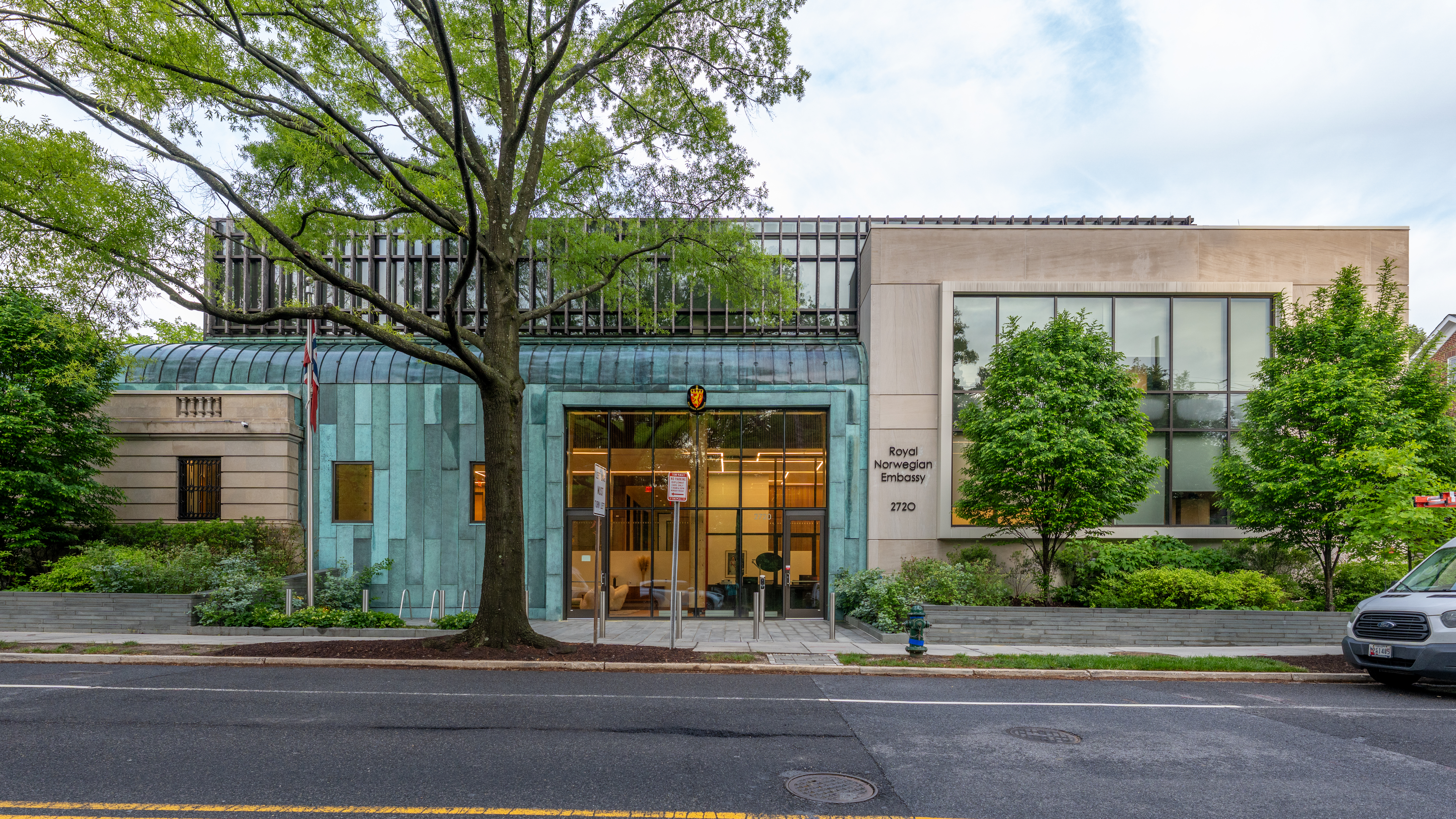
- Location: Washington, D.C.
- Address: 2720 34th St., NW, Washington DC 20008
- Ambassador: Anniken Huitfeldt
- Website: https://www.norway.no/en/usa/

The Embassy of Norway in Washington, D.C. is the diplomatic mission of the Kingdom of Norway to the United States.

It is presently located at 2720 34th St., NW, Washington DC 20008. The embassy in Washington, D.C. is Norway's largest, with a staff of approximately 50, including representatives from a number of Norwegian ministries.

The Ambassador is Anniken Huitfeldt.

== History ==
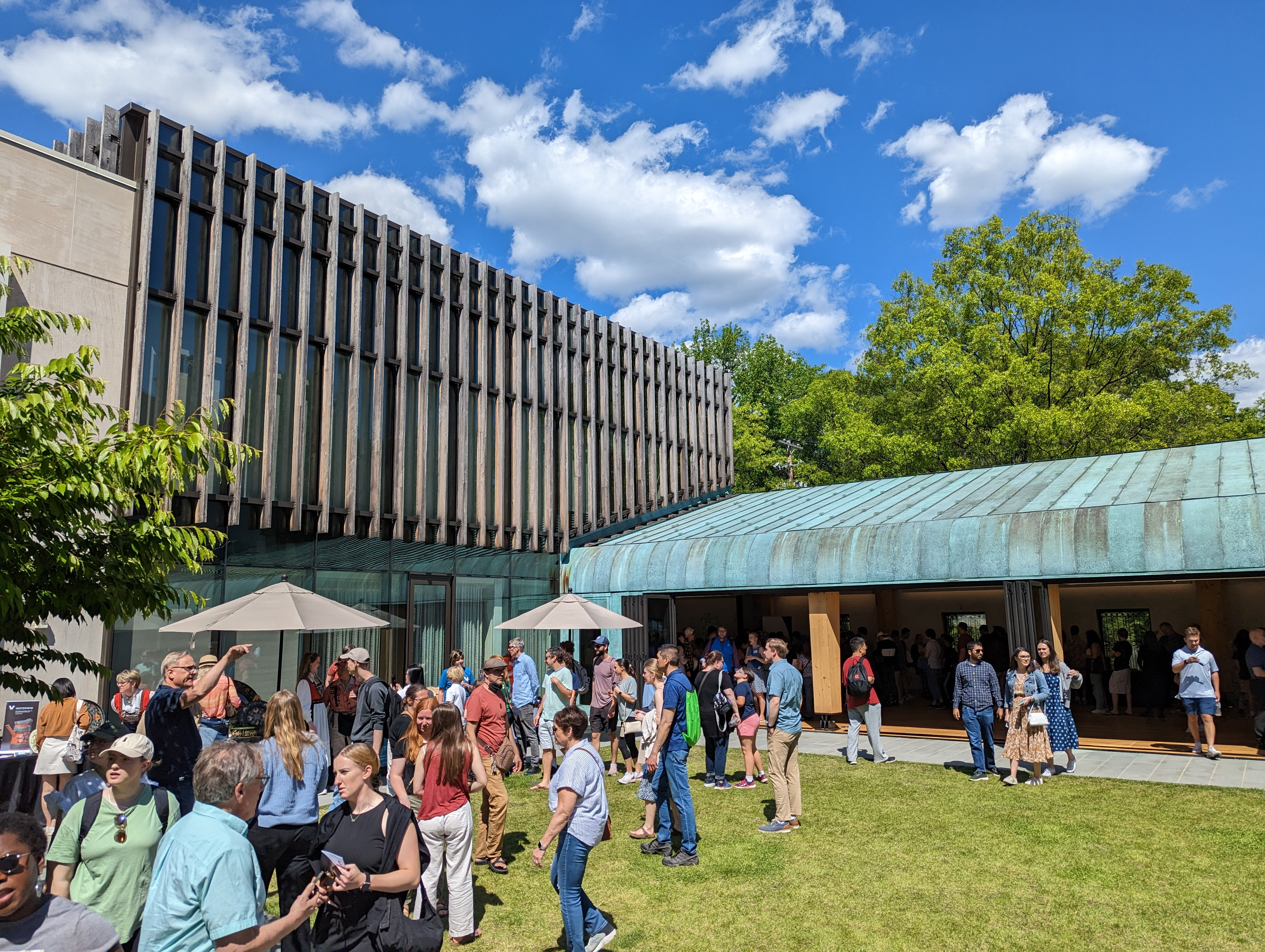
Courtyard in 2023

Norway established an embassy in the United States in 1906, a year after Norwegian independence from Sweden.

The current chancery was built in 1977. Fentress Architects conducted a major renovation and expansion of the complex, incorporating various new features such as a new copper-clad timber hull and various sustainability upgrades, that was completed in May 2022.

== Norwegian consulates in the United States ==
The embassy also operates consulates general in New York City and San Francisco. In addition, there are 38 Norwegian honorary consulates around the United States.

== See also ==
- Statue of Crown Princess Märtha
- Foreign relations of Norway
- Foreign relations of the United States
- Norway–United States relations
- Norwegian Christmas Tree in Washington, D.C.
