= Knut Hedemann =

Norwegian diplomat (1922–2011)

Knut Hedemann (13 May 1922 – 2 May 2011) was a Norwegian diplomat.

He was born in Ringsaker Municipality as a son of politician Rudolf Hedemann and younger brother of journalist Reidar Hedemann. He finished his secondary education in 1943. During the Second World War he was a member of the Norwegian police troops in exile in Sweden, having fled from Norway in 1944. After studying in the US from 1946 to 1947 he took the cand.jur. degree at the University of Oslo in 1948. In the same year he married physician's daughter Gro Ranveig Hansen.

He started working for the Norwegian Ministry of Foreign Affairs as a secretary in 1949. He served as an embassy secretary in the United Kingdom and France (the embassy to NATO and OEEC), before becoming assistant secretary in the Ministry of Foreign Affairs in 1958 and sub-director in 1961. In the 1960s he was a chargé d'affaires in Israel and Turkey, and an embassy counsellor in Sweden. He was promoted to deputy under-secretary of state in the Ministry of Foreign Affairs in 1969, but went on to be chargé d'affaires in Kenya in 1972. He served as the Norwegian ambassador to Canada from 1975 to 1978, to the United States from 1979 to 1984 and to Austria from 1984 to 1990.

He received the Grand Cross of the Order of Merit of the Federal Republic of Germany and was a Knight of the Order of the Polar Star and the Order of Homayoun. He was decorated as a Commander of the Order of St. Olav in 1979. He died in 2011.

Diplomatic posts
Preceded by Søren Christian Sommerfelt	Norwegian ambassador to the United States; 1979–1984	Succeeded by Kjell Eliassen
