= Knut Vollebæk =

Norwegian diplomat and politician

Norwegian Ambassador to the United States
- In office 17 April 2001 – 17 April 2007
- Prime Minister: Kjell Magne Bondevik; Jens Stoltenberg
- Preceded by: Tom Vraalsen
- Succeeded by: Wegger Christian Strømmen

Minister of Foreign Affairs
- In office 17 October 1997 – 17 March 2000
- Prime Minister: Kjell Magne Bondevik
- Preceded by: Bjørn Tore Godal
- Succeeded by: Thorbjørn Jagland

Personal details
- Born: 11 February 1946 (age 80) Oslo, Norway
- Party: Christian Democratic
- Education: Norwegian School of Economics and Business Administration
- Profession: Ambassador

Knut Vollebæk (born 11 February 1946) is a Norwegian former diplomat and politician. A member of the Christian Democratic Party, he served as ambassador to the United States from 2001 to 2007. He is currently a member of the International Commission on Missing Persons Board of Commissioners and heads a government commission investigating the situation of Norwegian Travellers.

== Education ==
He was educated at the Norwegian School of Economics. He also attended the University of Oslo and the University of California, Santa Barbara, as well as completing studies in the French language and culture at Institut Catholique de Paris and in the Spanish language and culture at the Universidad Complutense of Madrid.

== Career ==
In September 2013, he was elected to the Board of Commissioners of the International Commission on Missing Persons (ICMP).

Vollebæk was the OSCE High Commissioner on National Minorities from 2007 until 2013.

Prior to that, Vollebæk served as Ambassador to the United States between 2001 and 2007 and as Foreign Minister of Norway from 1997 to 2000. He was chairman-in-Office of the OSCE in 1999.

Vollebæk's diplomatic career includes assignments to New Delhi, Madrid and Harare. He was Norwegian Ambassador to Costa Rica in 1991–1993 and Assistant Secretary General at the Norwegian Ministry of Foreign Affairs from 1994 until he became Foreign Minister in 1997. He served as Deputy Co-Chairman of the International Conference on the Former Yugoslavia in 1993.

He was appointed primus inter pares of the Panel of Eminent Persons on Strengthening the Effectiveness of the OSCE in 2005. He was Chairman of the Council of the Baltic Sea States in 1999–2000 and Chairman of the Barents Euro-Arctic Council in 1997–1998. Between October 1989 and November 1990, he was the Deputy Minister for Foreign Affairs of Norway.

Political offices
| Preceded by Bjørn Tore Godal | Minister of Foreign Affairs; 1997–2000 | Succeeded by Thorbjørn Jagland |
Diplomatic posts
| Preceded by Tom Vraalsen | Norwegian Ambassador to the United States; 2001–2007 | Succeeded by Wegger Christian Strømmen |
| Preceded by Rolf Ekéus | OSCE High Commissioner on National Minorities; 2007–2013 | Succeeded by Astrid Thors |
