= Christian Hedemann =

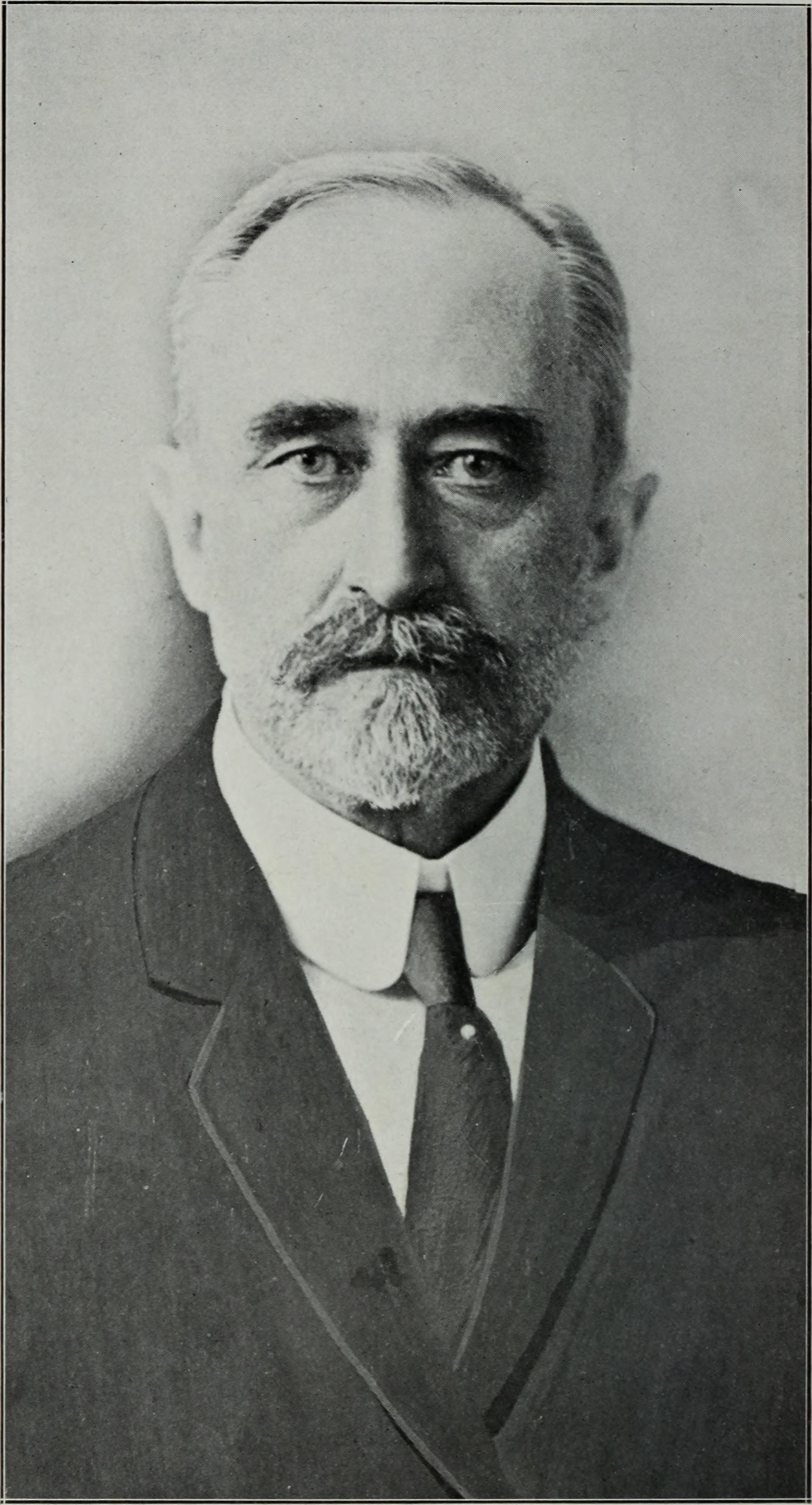
Christian Hedemann

Christian Jacob Hedemann (25 May 1852 – 18 May 1932) was a Danish mechanical engineer who settled in Hawaii in 1878, where he worked at the Hana Sugar Plantation and the Honolulu Iron Works. He is, however, remembered primarily as an avid amateur photographer who helped found the Hawaiian Camera Club (1889–1893). His photographs of native peoples, landscape, family, and industry offer a unique pictorial record of Hawaii at the end of the 19th century.

== Early life ==
Christian Hedemann was born in 1852 at Flensburg in Schleswig-Holstein, which at the time was part of the Kingdom of Denmark. He was the son of Christian August Ferdinand Hedemann (1810-1879), an eminent surgeon in the Danish army, and Caroline Amalie Cloos (1824-1867). After attending primary school in Næstved, he continued his education at Herlufsholm School and graduated with first class honours in mechanical engineering at the Polytechnic College in Copenhagen. After an apprenticeship in a machine shop, he was employed as a designer by Burmeister & Wain in Copenhagen (1874–78). In October 1877, he married Meta Marie Magdalena Nissen (1850-1952).

== Professional life in Hawaii ==
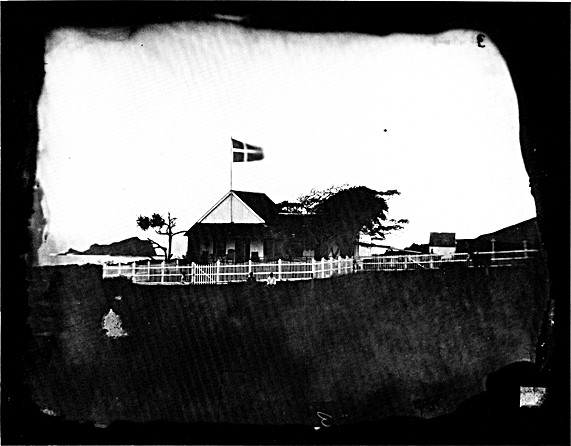
The Hana home Christian Hedemann (1880)

He arrived in Honolulu with his family in 1878 where, at the age of 25, he became chief engineer on a three-year contract at the Hana Sugar Plantation on the island of Maui. But instead of returning to Denmark at the end of his contract, in 1884 he joined the Honolulu Iron Works, the largest manufacturer of sugar mill machinery in the Kingdom of Hawaii. Initially a draftsman, he ultimately became the company's technical director.

In 1903, he obtained American citizenship and, in 1909, was appointed Danish consul. In March 1917, he was decorated as a knight of the Order of Dannebrog.

== Amateur photographer ==
Hedemann had taken a great interest in photography ever since he visited the World Exposition in Vienna in 1873 where many exhibits featured photography. Before leaving for Hawaii he acquired a camera of his own and learned the art of making images on glass plate negatives, using the wet plate collodion process. The first dated photograph is a view of his house with a Danish flag taken in Hana on 1 February 1880. It was followed by informal portraits of his growing family and home, as well as of the sugar mill, co-workers and friends. In 1883, he converted his carriage shed into a studio with removable roof sections to improve the light. This allowed him to take portraits not only of the native inhabitants, which proved invaluable to ethnic studies, but also of Chinese and Portuguese workers and a small colony of Scandinavians.

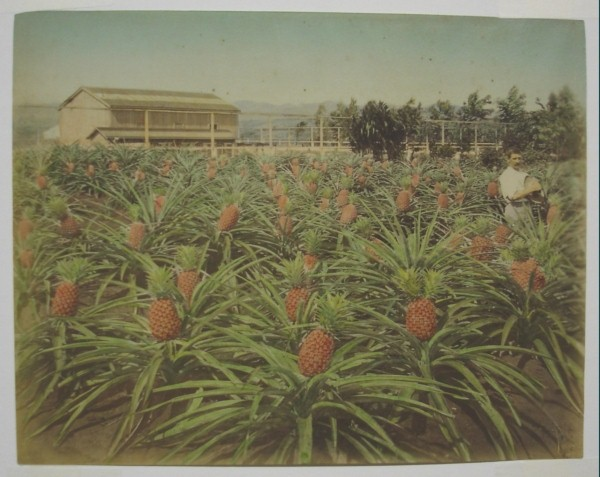
Hawaiian pineapple field (tinted): Christian Hedemann (1880s)

The photographs of his wife and seven children show how Danish traditions were maintained, for example in the children's clothing, while his photographs of the mills document the industrial evolution of the islands. Some of these were presented at the Hawaiian Government Exhibit at the Paris Exposition of 1889, demonstrating not only the progress of the plant, but also the industrial transformation of Hawaii. In January 1889, Hedemann was one of the founding members and the first president of the Hawaiian Camera Club, which brought amateur photographers from Honolulu together with those he had met during his travels around the islands. The club gave Hedemann the opportunity to follow and experiment with the latest techniques such as magnesium powder flash photography and photographic enlargements as well as the use of the so-called magic lantern. In 1892, when he first returned to Denmark, Hedemann took his lantern slide projector with him in order to show his new home to his family and friends.

Hedemann died in Honolulu in 1932 leaving a collection of photographs which provide a record not only of his close-knit family and his faith in the industrial age but also of the islands themselves at the end of the 19th century.

== See also ==
- Photography in Denmark

== Related reading ==
- Dorrance, William H.; Morgan, Francis (2000) Sugar Islands: The 165-Year Story of Sugar in Hawaiʻi (Honolulu, HI: Mutual Publishing) ISBN 978-1566475037
- Takaki, Ronald T. (1983) Pau Hana: Plantation Life and Labor in Hawaii, 1835-1920 (University of Hawaii Press) ISBN 978-0824809560
