= Eindride Sommerseth =

Norwegian politician

Eindride Sommerseth (21 March 1918 – 21 May 2010) was a Norwegian trade unionist and politician for the Labour Party.

He was born in Meløy Municipality. In his early career he was a mechanic for the Norwegian State Railways in Grong and Mosjøen. During the occupation of Norway by Nazi Germany, he fled to the United Kingdom where he underwent training as a tank mechanic, and also military training in England and Iceland.

After the war he was stationed in the Norwegian Armed Forces until 1948, when he took a mechanics job at Norsk Hydro in Glomfjord. He headed the trade union there from 1961 to 1971, and during this time he was also a national board member of the Norwegian Union of Chemical Industry Workers. He served as an elected member of the municipal council of Meløy Municipality from 1963 to 1968 and 1971 to 1975.

He served as a deputy representative to the Parliament of Norway from Nordland during the terms 1965–1969, 1969–1973 and 1973–1977. From January to October 1972 he met as a regular representative, covering for Magnus Andersen who was a member of Bratteli's First Cabinet. From 1973 to 1977 he covered for Eivind Bolle who was a member of Bratteli's Second Cabinet. During this full term he was a member of the Standing Committee on Transport and Communications.
