= Hans Gabrielsen =

Norwegian jurist and politician (1891–1965)

Hans Julius Gabrielsen

Governor of Finnmark
- In office 1928–1948
- Preceded by: Hagbarth Lund
- Succeeded by: Peder Holt

Acting County Governor of Troms
- In office 1940–1941
- Preceded by: Gunnar Bjørn Nordbye
- Succeeded by: Hans Skotner (acting)

Consultative Councillor of State for Finnmark Affairs
- In office 1945–1945
- Preceded by: position created
- Succeeded by: position abolished

County Governor of Oppland
- In office 1948–1961
- Preceded by: Alfred Ihlen
- Succeeded by: Nils Handal

Personal details
- Born: 8 January 1891 Kristiania, Norway
- Died: 10 March 1965 (aged 74) Lillehammer, Norway
- Citizenship: Norway
- Party: Liberal
- Spouse: Sara Andersen (m. 1918–1965)
- Profession: Politician, Jurist, Judge

Hans Julius Gabrielsen (8 January 1891–10 March 1965) was a Norwegian jurist and politician for the Liberal Party. He is best known as County Governor of Finnmark and County Governor of Oppland, as well as Consultative Councillor of State for Finnmark Affairs in 1945.

Gabrielsen played a central role in organizing the civilian side of Norwegian war effort in Northern Norway during the 1940 Norwegian Campaign. After the end of that campaign he led the Norwegian attempts at retaining some of their armed forces outside German control, before being arrested by the Germans and placed in concentration camp. After the war Gabrielsen became a cabinet member and led the early reconstruction efforts in the northernmost parts of Norway.

== Pre-war life ==
=== Early life and career ===
He was born in Kristiania as a son of district stipendiary magistrate Nils Harald Berg Gabrielsen (1856–1934) and Ragnhild Stenersen (1857–1938). He grew up in Hadeland, and graduated with the cand.jur. degree in 1914. He worked as a deputy judge in Nes Municipality from 1914 to 1915, and as an attorney in Tana Municipality from 1915 to 1921. Here he married Sara Andersen (born 16 March 1896) in 1918. Gabrielsen was a secretary in the Ministry of Justice for one year, before being appointed district stipendiary magistrate in the Vardø District Court. In 1928 he became the County Governor of Finnmark.

=== Finnmark County Governor ===
While County Governor of Finnmark, Gabrielsen was a member of the Finnmark Commission (Norwegian: Finnmarksnevnden) from 1931, coordinating official Norwegian policy towards the national minorities in Finnmark. In 1928 Gabrielsen and the Norwegian Ministry of Foreign Affairs opposed replacing the earth goahti used by the border garrison at Svanvik near Finland with regular barracks, to avoid a military build-up that might challenge the friendly relations Norway had with Finland. Gabrielsen instead argued for spending the funds on building more police and customs posts at the border instead. At the time the earthen goahti at Svanvik was considered the largest in the world. Gabrielsen wanted the military moved further away from the border in order to maintain friendly relations with Finland. Gabrielsen was generally positive towards Finland, in a period when many Norwegian officials viewed the young country's national ambitions with suspicion. Gabrielsen wanted more trade and tourist traffic with Finland. Still, he cooperated with the bishop of the Diocese of Hålogaland, Eivind Berggrav, in carrying out surveillance of Finnish and Kven people in the region. In 1932 Gabrielsen even went so far as to suggest a strict regulation of Finnish priests' access to use churches in the Norwegian border areas. During the same year Gabrielsen was part of a group of officials that intervened after slate workers in Alta Municipality broke out in demonstrations and elected a company board dominated by communists. The officials reorganized the slate production in Alta, starting the new company Alta Skiferlag. The slate workers were then forced to deliver their products to the company.

== The Second World War ==
=== Norwegian Campaign ===
In 1940, the Second World War reached Norway with the German invasion on 9 April. German forces conquered Southern Norway during the first three weeks of the Norwegian Campaign, and the last Norwegian stronghold was Northern Norway, of which Finnmark is the northernmost part. After the German invasion Gabrielsen discussed the situation with the Norwegian commanding general in Northern Norway, General Carl Gustav Fleischer. Fleischer had been on an inspection journey of Finnmark, and had arrived in Vadsø in evening of 8 April 1940. Due to a violent blizzard Fleischer could not leave Vadsø when the invasion came the next day and had to spend the night in Vadsø. Gabrielsen then invited Fleischer and his chief of staff, Major Odd Lindbäck-Larsen to stay at the County Governor's mansion. The result of the discussions was an agreement that the best course of action was for Fleischer to declare Northern Norway a theatre of war. Fleischer thus assumed all power in the region and ordered a total military and civilian mobilization. At first Gabrielsen was given the task of handling most of the civilian authority in Finnmark while the area was a theatre of war. However, after the sudden death of the County Governor of Troms a few days later he relocated to Tromsø and assumed the entire civilian administration for all of Northern Norway. Together with General Fleischer Gabrielsen set Northern Norway on a war footing to support the fighting on the Narvik front. As part of his work for the war effort Gabrielsen went through great efforts to obtain the supplies needed for the coming months. While the Norwegian Armed Forces had enough to make it through the summer, the civilian population at first had small stocks of essential goods. Gabrielsen and other officials soon solved the supply problems through contracts with foreign suppliers. Goods also came in from captured German supply ships, and from the British military. The cooperative effort between Gabrielsen and Fleischer continued until the Nygaardsvold's Cabinet and the overall commanding general in Norway, Otto Ruge, escaped the German advance in Southern Norway and came to the north in May. The cabinet sent Gabrielsen back to Finnmark and assumed power themselves over civilian and many aspects of the military matters. Gabrielsen's and Fleischer's governance of Northern Norway had been highly popular with the local population, who felt that their views were finally being heard by those in control. Due to this popularity of the improvised administration what was viewed as essentially as a switch back to central rule was not well received by the North Norwegian population, who wanted a voice in the government. When King Haakon VII and the Norwegian cabinet arrived in Tromsø on the former royal yacht Heimdal on 1 May 1940, having transferred from the Royal Navy cruiser HMS Glasgow in the Gisundet narrows just off the Malangen fjord, it was Gabrielsen who arranged their accommodation. Gabrielsen felt that it would not be safe for the King and cabinet ministers to stay in the city of Tromsø, instead organizing housing for them in the surrounding areas. King Haakon VII and Crown Prince Olav were relocated to the village of Øverbygd in the Målselvdalen valley, taking the prime minister, Johan Nygaardsvold with them. Nygaardsvold brought along Minister of Social Affairs Sverre Støstad in order to maintain contact with his cabinet and avoid becoming isolated. Nygaardsvold moved to Tromsø on 18 May in order to gather the cabinet in one location. The Norwegian forces in mainland Norway capitulated on 10 June 1940.

=== Occupation ===
After the Norwegian capitulation Gabrielsen continued as County Governor of Finnmark, and from October 1940 to June 1941 he was also the acting County Governor of Troms.

==== The border guard ====
When the Norwegian government evacuated to the United Kingdom in June 1940 they had given Gabrielsen the task of administrating the as yet unoccupied parts of Northern Norway. In this respect Gabrielsen commanded the troops still guarding the border against the Soviet Union in accordance with the capitulation agreement. The border units were under the military command of Colonel Wilhelm Faye. The arrangement had been organized by General Otto Ruge, who during the capitulation negotiations with the Germans demanded that the Norwegians should either be allowed to retain military forces on the eastern border, or that the Germans should immediately occupy all of Finnmark. This demand originated in a fear of a possible Soviet occupation of Eastern Finnmark, as had happened in Poland in 1939. As the Norwegian military refused to serve under direct German command, any potential orders from the Germans had to go through county governor Gabrielsen. The arrangement was supposed to last until the Germans could deploy forces to Eastern Finnmark, and was not cleared with the exiled Norwegian government, being secret for anyone but Gabrielsen. Gabrielsen and General Ruge ordered Gabrielsen's military chief-of-staff, Major Odd Lindbäck-Larsen, to use the two battalions and one artillery battery at his disposal in preparation for a rebuilding of the Norwegian Armed Forces. Lindbäck-Larsen was to start training officers, using the border guard task as a cover. The 1,600-1,700 strong border guard was however dissolved by the German occupying authorities in July 1940. The plan for the establishment of a new Norwegian elite army in Finnmark, outside German control, was supposed to include several thousands of soldiers. As part of Ruge's plan Gabrielsen and Lindbäck-Larsen had placed Norwegian liaison officers on strategic points from Saltdalen in the south to Kirkenes in the north-east. The hope had been that a new Norwegian volunteer army would be allowed by the Germans to remain on border guard duties in Finnmark for the duration of the conflict. After the Germans took over the border guard duties in early July 1940 Gabrielsen was given command over four armed Norwegian guard posts at the coast of Eastern Finnmark. These guard posts were set up on the secret orders of the German officer in charge of Eastern Finnmark, SS-Obersturmführer Willy Laqua, in accordance with the capitulation agreement. None of the Norwegian officers and soldiers on border guard duties were informed of the fact that they were under German overall command.

==== Arrest and imprisonment ====
On 17 June 1941 he was arrested by the Nazi authorities. He was incarcerated until April 1942 at Møllergata 19, and from 24 April 1942 to the war's end on 8 May 1945 he was imprisoned at Grini concentration camp. In the summer of 1942 both Gabrielsen and Lindbäck-Larsen were part of the so-called Forest Gang (Norwegian: Skogsgjengen) at Grini, which spent the summer days cutting down trees near the camp. The forestry work allowed easy access to food hidden in the woods by sympathizers, and messages could be smuggled in and out with little difficulty, making the Forest Gang the most popular assignment at Grini. During his time at Grini Gabrielsen also took part in secret debating meetings organized by journalists amongst the prisoners, where various aspects of the organizing of post-war Norway was discussed. Amongst the issues Gabrielsen discussed with fellow Grini inmates was the post-war reconstruction of Finnmark, most of the county having been laid waste during the German retreat in Northern Norway in 1944—1945. One important question with regards to the future reconstruction was whether or not the devastated areas should be rebuilt like they were organized before the war, or if they should be reformed with the future development in mind. With only the single exception of Finnkongkjeila in Gamvik Municipality the reconstruction ended up following the old pre-war population patterns.

== Post-war life ==
After Norway's liberation, Gabrielsen became a member of Gerhardsen's First Cabinet, the unification cabinet with members from many political parties—Gabrielsen represented the Liberal Party. He served in the Ministry of Provisioning and Reconstruction as Consultative Councillor of State for Finnmark Affairs. The northernmost part of Norway had been completely devastated during Germany's withdrawal, where they employed the scorched earth tactic. Gabrielsen cooperated with chief engineer Harald Hofseth in organizing the reconstruction effort. After serving as Consultative Councillor of State, Gabrielsen returned as County Governor. He became County Governor of Oppland in 1948, and remained there until his retirement in 1961. He was chairman of the board of Opplandskraft from 1952 and in Vinmonopolet from 1958 to 1962, and a board member of Utbyggingsfondet for Nord-Norge from 1952 to 1960.

He was decorated as a Commander With Star of the Order of St. Olav. Gabrielsen died in March 1965 in Lillehammer.

Government offices
Preceded by Hagbarth Lund	County Governor of Finnmark; 1928–1948; Imprisoned during the German occupation of Norway; Replaced by Nazi Gov. Thor Bekeng (1941-1944); Acting Gov. Peder Holt (1944–1945); Acting Gov. Erling Johannes Norvik (1945)	Succeeded by Peder Holt
Preceded by Gunnar Bjørn Nordbye	Acting County Governor of Troms; 1940–1941	Succeeded by Marcus Bull; Nazi-appointed governor
New ministerial post	Consultative Councillor of State for Finnmark Affairs; 1945–1948	Position abolished
Preceded by Alfred Ihlen	County Governor of Oppland; 1948–1961	Succeeded by Nils Handal
