= Onarheim (surname) =

Onarheim is a Norwegian surname. Notable people with the surname include:

- Leif Frode Onarheim (1934–2021), Norwegian businessperson and politician
- Onar Onarheim (1910–1988), Norwegian politician
