= Sven Olsen =

Norwegian politician

Sven Olsen (14 June 1922 – 24 July 2001) was a Norwegian politician for the Labour Party.

From 1971 to January 1972, during the first cabinet Bratteli, Olsen was appointed State Secretary in the Ministry of Fisheries. He left along with Minister of Fisheries Knut Hoem.

He served as a deputy representative to the Norwegian Parliament from Nordland during the term 1961–1965.
