= Elsa Rastad Bråten =

Norwegian politician (1918–1999)

Elsa Rastad Bråten (1 February 1918 – 21 December 1999) was a Norwegian politician for the Labour Party.

She was born in Oslo as a daughter of typographer and politician Ingvald Rastad and Sigrid Hilton.

During the first cabinet Bratteli from 1971 to 1972, Bråten was appointed State Secretary in the Ministry of Justice and the Police. She had served as political secretary (today known as political advisor) in the Ministry of Family and Consumer Affairs from 1959 to 1965.

She served as a deputy representative to the Norwegian Parliament from Oslo during the terms 1973–1977. From 1973 to 1976 she met as a regular representative, replacing Knut Frydenlund who was appointed to the second cabinet Bratteli. On the local level she was a member of Oslo city council from 1955 to 1963.

Bråten did not have a higher education. She worked as a journalist in Arbeiderbladet in 1945-1949 and 1950–1951, editor-in-chief of Arbeiderkvinnen from 1953 to 1959, and a consultant.
