= Thor Listau =

Norwegian politician

Minister of Fisheries
- In office 14 October 1981 – 4 October 1985
- Prime Minister: Kåre Willoch
- Preceded by: Eivind Bolle
- Succeeded by: Eivind Reiten

Member of the Norwegian Parliament
- In office 1 October 1973 – 30 September 1985
- Constituency: Finnmark

Personal details
- Born: 3 June 1938 Svolvær, Nordland, Norway
- Died: 22 March 2014 (aged 75) Bærum, Akershus, Norway
- Party: Conservative

Thor Listau (3 June 1938 – 22 March 2014) was a Norwegian military technician and politician for the Conservative Party. He was a three-term MP and served as Minister of Fisheries from 1981 to 1985. Later he served as director of Statkorn from 1991 to 1995.

== Early life and career ==
He was born in Svolvær as a son of fish food producer Magnus Listau (1898–1976) and housewife Johanna Jakobsen (1904–1945). After attending the military communications school from 1954 to 1958, he was employed in the military as a radio mechanic. From 1961 he served the Norwegian Army in Kirkenes.

== Political career ==
Here he chaired the local chapter of the Young Conservatives from 1965 to 1967, and the county chapter from 1967 to 1969. During those two years he was also a central board member of the Norwegian Young Conservatives. He was an elected member of the school board for Sør-Varanger Municipality from 1966 to 1971, and the municipal council of Sør-Varanger Municipality from 1967 to 1975, the last four years in the executive committee. He also chaired the local sports club in Hesseng, SK Vigør, for one year.

He was elected to the Parliament of Norway from Finnmark in 1973, and was re-elected in 1977 and 1981. In 1981, however, the Conservative Party fared to well as to form the Willoch's First Cabinet. Listau was selected for the cabinet as Minister of Fisheries, serving until 1985 (i.e. also in Willoch's Second Cabinet). While he was a cabinet member, his seat in Parliament was filled by Steinar Eriksen.

In 1986 he retired from electoral politics and was hired as an office manager in Statens Kornforretning. He also studied part-time and graduated from the BI Norwegian Business School in business administration in 1988. However, he continued in positions in the Conservative Party. Having been a member of its party platform committee from 1979 to 1981 and 1983 to 1985, he was a central board member from 1988 to 1990 and chaired the party's study league from 1988 to 1995.

== Later career and life ==
From 1991 to 1995 he served as director of Statkorn. In 1995 Statkorn was altered into the fish food producer and aquaculture company Cermaq, where he served as organizational director until 2005. He also chaired the board for the first year, 1995 to 1996. Listau also chaired Statskraftverkene from 1985 to 1991 and was a board member of Sør-Varanger Avis and Finnmarksposten from 1974 to 1982, and the Norwegian Guarantee Institute for Export Credits from 1993 to 2004.

He resided at Østerås in Bærum Municipality in his later life. He died there in March 2014.
