= Leif Jørgen Aune =

Norwegian economist and politician (1925–2019)

Minister of Local Government
- In office 16 October 1973 – 11 January 1978
- Prime Minister: Trygve Bratteli; Odvar Nordli
- Preceded by: Johan Skipnes
- Succeeded by: Arne Nilsen

State Secretary for the Ministry of Local Government
- In office 19 March 1971 – 18 October 1972
- Prime Minister: Trygve Bratteli
- Minister: Odvar Nordli

Personal details
- Born: 7 June 1925 Bodø, Norway
- Died: 20 July 2019 (aged 94) Fredrikstad, Norway
- Party: Labour Party
- Occupation: Economist, politician

Leif Jørgen Aune (7 June 1925 – 20 July 2019) was a Norwegian economist and politician for the Labour Party.

From 1971 to 1972, in the first cabinet Bratteli, Aune was appointed state secretary in the Ministry of Local Government and Labour. He left the position when the first cabinet Bratteli fell in 1972, and from 1973 to 1978 he served as Minister of Local Government and Labour in the second cabinet Bratteli and the cabinet Nordli. He resigned on 11 January 1978.

Outside politics, he graduated as cand.oecon. in 1951 and worked mainly with regional development. He was director of the Regional Development Fund from 1978 to 1990. In addition, he was a member of the board of Christiania Bank og Kreditkasse, Ullevål University Hospital as well as various other councils, boards and agencies.

Political offices
Preceded by Johan Skipnes	Norwegian Minister of Local Government and Labour; 1973–1978	Succeeded by Arne Nilsen
Government offices
Preceded by Reidar Carlsen	Director of the Regional Development Fund; 1978–1990	Succeeded by Terje Stubberud
Preceded by Trygve Hegnar	Chair of Ullevål Hospital; 1993–1996	Succeeded by Lars Haukaas
