= Trygve Olsen =

Norwegian politician

Minister of Fisheries
- In office 18 October 1972 – 16 October 1973
- Prime Minister: Lars Korvald
- Preceded by: Magnus Andersen
- Succeeded by: Eivind Bolle

Mayor of Måsøy Municipality
- In office 1968–1972

Personal details
- Born: Trygve Jens Asbjørn Olsen; 21 November 1921 Måsøy, Finnmark, Norway
- Died: 17 April 1979 (aged 57)
- Party: Centre
- Occupation: Fisher; Politician

Trygve Jens Asbjørn Olsen (11 November 1921 – 17 April 1979) was a Norwegian politician for the Centre Party.

He was born in Måsøy Municipality in Finnmark, Norway.

Trygve Olsen was the son of Parliament member Johannes Olai Olsen, but was not elected to parliament himself. Instead, he worked as a fisherman starting in 1939. He served on the board of Norges Råfisklag from 1958 to 1966, and was chairman of Fiskebåtredernes forbund from 1977 to 1979. He was the Minister of Fisheries from 1972–1973 during the cabinet Korvald.

Olsen was active in local politics, serving as mayor of Måsøy Municipality from 1968 to 1972. During the same period, he was also a member of the Finnmark county council.

Political offices
Preceded by Magnus Andersen	Norwegian Minister of Fisheries; 1972–1973	Succeeded by Eivind Bolle
