= Norgrain =

Norwegian grain firm

Norgrain is a Norwegian grain firm based in Stavanger, Norway. The company imports and distributes grain throughout Norway and Scandinavia. The company was previously known as Unicorn Import, and was incorporated in 2006. Cermaq holds a significant stake in the firm.
