= Thor Bekeng =

Norwegian politician

Thor Bekeng (1905 – 27 March 1977) was a Norwegian politician. He joined the Nasjonal Samling party in 1935. Bekeng was appointed county governor in Troms county, Norway, in January 1941. In April 1941 he was given the additional task of running the administration of the neighboring Finnmark county. On 14 June 1941, he was appointed as county governor in Finnmark after the governor Hans Gabrielsen was arrested by the occupation government of Norway. He served as the Nasjonal Samling's governor of Finnmark until 1944. After the liberation of Finnmark began, Peder Holt was appointed to be the acting governor of Finnmark.

Government offices
Preceded by Hans Gabrielsen	County Governor of Finnmark; 1941–1944	Succeeded by Peder Holt; Acting for Hans Gabrielsen
