= Jenny Lund =

Jenny Lund may refer to:

- Jenny Lund (runner)
- Jenny Lund (politician)
