= Magnus Andersen (politician) =

Norwegian politician (1916–1994)

Minister of Fisheries
- In office 24 January 1972 – 18 October 1972
- Prime Minister: Trygve Bratteli
- Preceded by: Knut Hoem
- Succeeded by: Trygve Olsen
- In office 25 September 1963 – 12 October 1965
- Prime Minister: Einar Gerhardsen
- Preceded by: Onar Onarheim
- Succeeded by: Oddmund Myklebust

Member of the Storting
- In office 1 October 1965 – 30 September 1973
- Deputy: Ola Teigen (1965); Eindride Sommerseth (1972)
- Constituency: Nordland

Personal details
- Born: Magnus Kristoffer Andersen; 20 March 1916 Andøy, Nordland, Norway
- Died: 11 December 1994 (aged 78) Bø, Norway
- Party: Labour
- Spouse: Josie Lovise Steffensen (m. 1939)
- Occupation: Fisherman; Politician

Magnus Kristoffer Andersen (20 March 1916 in Andøy Municipality – 11 December 1994) was a Norwegian politician for the Labour Party. He served as Minister of Fisheries from 1963 to 1965 and again from January to October 1972. He was also an MP for Nordland from 1965 to 1973.

Andersen worked as a fisher until 1955, when he became chairman of Norges Fiskarlag (Union of Norwegian Fishers), where he had been a member of the board since 1951. He served as chairman of the organisation until 1963. This year, Andersen became Minister of Fisheries in the fourth cabinet Gerhardsen (25 September 1963 - 12 October 1965). He served again in the same position in the first cabinet Bratteli from 24 January 1972, upon the resignation of Knut Hoem, until the dissolution of the government on 18 October.

After this, he sat two periods in the Norwegian Parliament for Nordland. In the first period he was a member of the expanded Foreign Affairs and Constitutional Committee, and vice-chairman of the Shipping and Fishery Committee. In the second period he was vice-chairman of Fullmaktskomiteen (the Plenipotentiary Committee), in addition to serving on the same committees as in the last period.

Andersen also served on a number of different boards of directors throughout a long political career. Amongst other things he was chairman of the board of the Norwegian Postal Service from 1974 to 1982. In local politics, he served one term in the executive committee of the municipal council for Bø Municipality from 1951 to 1955.

Political offices
Preceded by Onar Onarheim	Minister of Fisheries (Norway); 1963–1965	Succeeded by Oddmund Myklebust
Preceded by Knut Hoem	Minister of Fisheries (Norway); January 1972–October 1972	Succeeded by Trygve Olsen
