= Minister of Fisheries and Ocean Policy =

Norwegian cabinet minister

Minister of Fisheries and Ocean Policy of Norway
- Fiskeri- og havministeren

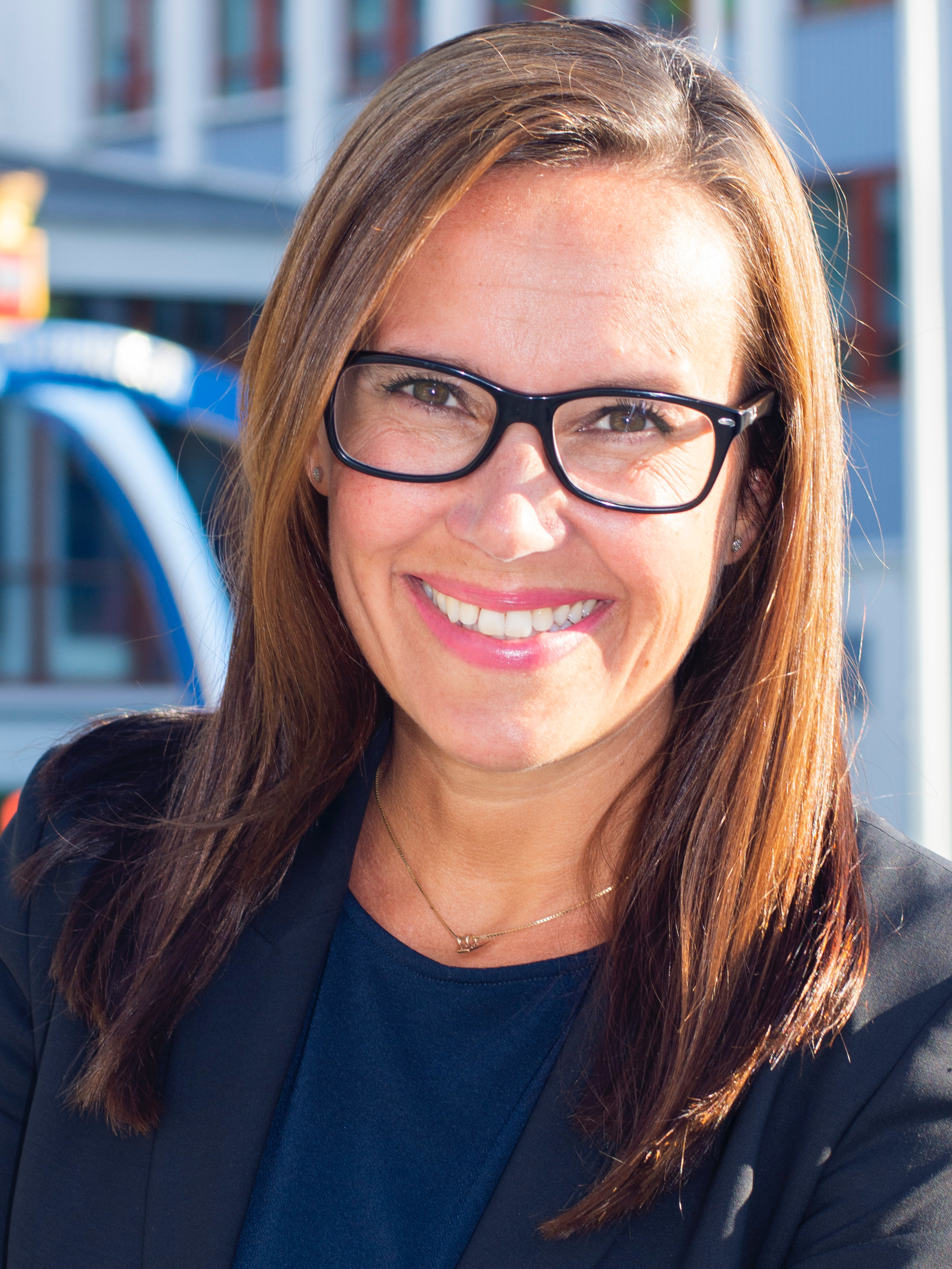
- Incumbent; Marianne Sivertsen Næss since 19 April 2024
- Ministry of Trade, Industry and Fisheries
- Member of: Council of State
- Seat: Oslo
- Nominator: Prime Minister of Norway
- Appointer: Monarch; With approval of Parliament
- Term length: No fixed length
- Constituting instrument: Constitution of Norway
- Formation: 1 July 1946
- First holder: Reidar Carlsen
- Deputy: State secretaries for the Minister of Fisheries and Ocean Policy
- Website: Official website

The Minister of Fisheries and Ocean Policy (Bokmål: Fiskeri- og havministeren) is a councilor of state in the Ministry of Trade, Industry and Fisheries. The incumbent minister is Marianne Sivertsen Næss of the Labour Party who has served since April 2024.

The position was created 1 July 1946. Between 2004 and 2013 the minister held the name of Minister of Fisheries and Coastal Affairs reflecting a broadening in responsibility for the ministry. When Solberg's Cabinet took office, the minister was again called Minister of Fisheries and did no longer have responsibilities for coastal affairs.

The Ministry of Fisheries and Coastal Affairs was abolished in January 2014, but the minister post was kept, and now heads responsibilities for fisheries in the new Ministry of Trade, Industry and Fisheries, alongside the Minister of Trade and Industry.

== Ministers ==
Key
Conservative Party
Centre Party
Labour Party
Progress Party

=== List of ministers ===
Photo	Name	Party	Took office	Left office	Tenure	Cabinet	Ref
	Reidar Carlsen	Labour	1 July 1946	19 November 1951	5 years, 141 days	Gerhardsen II	
	Peder Holt	Labour	19 November 1951	22 January 1955	3 years, 64 days	Torp	
	Nils Lysø	Labour	22 January 1955	28 August 1963	8 years, 218 days	Gerhardsen III	
	Onar Onarheim	Conservative	28 August 1963	25 September 1963	28 days	Lyng	
	Magnus Andersen	Labour	25 September 1963	12 October 1965	2 years, 17 days	Gerhardsen IV	
	Oddmund Myklebust	Centre	12 October 1965	8 November 1968	3 years, 27 days	Borten	
	Einar Moxnes	Centre	8 November 1968	17 March 1971	2 years, 129 days	Borten	
	Knut Hoem	Labour	17 March 1971	24 January 1972	313 days	Bratteli I	
	Magnus Andersen	Labour	24 January 1972	18 October 1972	268 days	Bratteli I	
	Trygve Olsen	Centre	18 October 1972	16 October 1973	363 days	Korvald	
	Eivind Bolle	Labour	16 October 1973	14 October 1981	7 years, 363 days	Bratteli II; Nordli; Brundtland I	
	Thor Listau	Conservative	14 October 1981	4 October 1985	3 years, 355 days	Willoch I-II	
	Eivind Reiten	Centre	4 October 1985	9 May 1986	217 days	Willoch II	
	Bjarne Mørk-Eidem	Labour	9 May 1986	10 October 1989	3 years, 154 days	Brundtland II	
	Svein Munkejord	Conservative	16 October 1989	3 November 1990	1 year, 18 days	Syse	
	Oddrunn Pettersen	Labour	3 November 1990	4 September 1992	1 year, 306 days	Brundtland III	
	Jan Henry T. Olsen	Labour	4 September 1992	25 October 1996	4 years, 51 days	Brundtland III	
	Karl Eirik Schjøtt-Pedersen	Labour	25 October 1996	17 October 1997	357 days	Jagland	
	Peter Angelsen	Centre	17 October 1997	21 January 2000	2 years, 96 days	Bondevik I	
	Lars Peder Brekk	Centre	21 January 2000	17 March 2000	56 days	Bondevik I	
	Otto Gregussen	Labour	17 March 2000	19 October 2001	1 year, 216 days	Stoltenberg I	
	Svein Ludvigsen	Conservative	19 October 2001	17 October 2005	3 years, 363 days	Bondevik II	
	Helga Pedersen	Labour	17 October 2005	2 October 2009	3 years, 350 days	Stoltenberg II	
	Lisbeth Berg-Hansen	Labour	20 October 2009	16 October 2013	3 years, 361 days	Stoltenberg II	
	Elisabeth Aspaker	Conservative	16 October 2013	16 December 2015	2 years, 61 days	Solberg	
	Per Sandberg	Progress	16 December 2015	13 August 2018	2 years, 240 days	Solberg	
	Harald T. Nesvik	Progress	13 August 2018	24 January 2020	1 year, 164 days	Solberg	
	Geir-Inge Sivertsen	Conservative	24 January 2020	2 March 2020	38 days	Solberg	
	Odd Emil Ingebrigtsen	Conservative	13 March 2020	14 October 2021	1 year, 215 days	Solberg	
	Bjørnar Skjæran	Labour	14 October 2021	16 October 2023	2 years, 2 days	Støre	
	Cecilie Myrseth	Labour	16 October 2023	19 April 2024	186 days	Støre	
	Marianne Sivertsen Næss	Labour	19 April 2024	Incumbent	2 years, 175 days	Støre	
