= Knut Hoem =

Norwegian politician (1924–1987)

Minister of Fisheries
- In office 17 March 1971 – 24 January 1972
- Prime Minister: Trygve Bratteli
- Preceded by: Einar Moxnes
- Succeeded by: Magnus Andersen

Personal details
- Born: 27 January 1924 Hammerfest, Finnmark, Norway
- Died: 20 June 1987 (aged 63)
- Party: Labour

Knut Hoem (27 January 1924 – 20 June 1987) was a Norwegian politician for the Labour Party.

He was born in Hammerfest and graduated as cand.jur. in 1950, and was a secretary in the Ministry of Fisheries from 1951 to 1954. He then spent his career working in Norges Råfisklag, a Norwegian fishing cooperative, sitting as CEO from 1964 to 1987.

He was Minister of Fisheries in from March 1971 to January 1972 during the first cabinet Bratteli. He resigned following the negotiation results with the EC. His resignation largely impacted the “no” result in the referendum later that year.

Political offices
| Preceded by Einar Hole Moxnes | Norwegian Minister of Fisheries; 1971–1972 | Succeeded by Magnus Andersen |
