= First Bratteli cabinet =

Government of Norway from 1971 to 1972

Bratteli's First Cabinet
- Cabinet of Norway

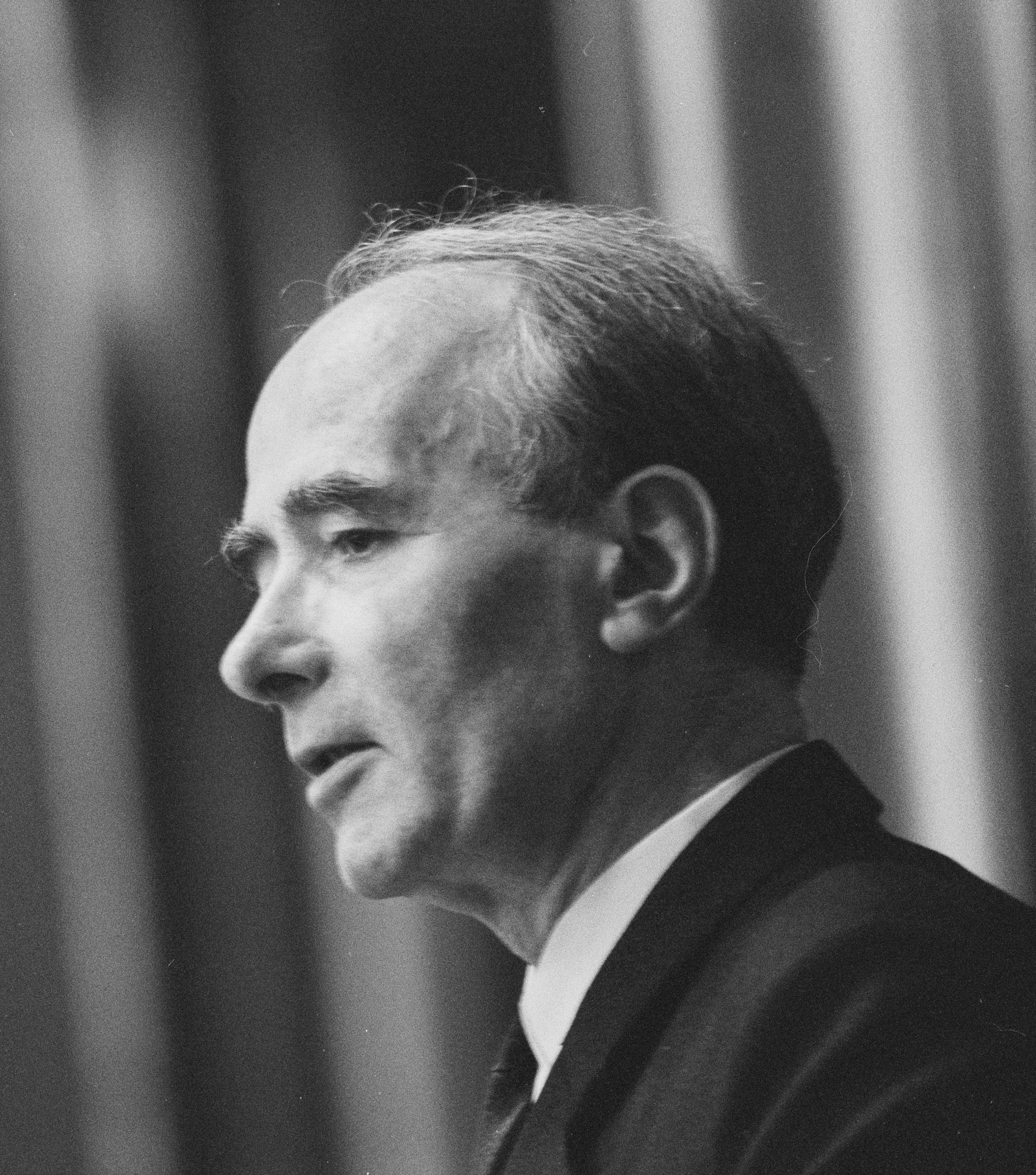
- Date formed: 17 March 1971
- Date dissolved: 18 October 1972

People and organisations
- King: Olav V of Norway
- Prime Minister: Trygve Bratteli
- Total no. of members: 15
- Member party: Labour Party
- Status in legislature: Minority government

History
- Legislature term: 1969–1973
- Predecessor: Borten's Cabinet
- Successor: Korvald's Cabinet

Bratteli's First Cabinet governed Norway between 17 March 1971 and 18 October 1972. The Labour Party cabinet was led by Trygve Bratteli. Bratteli governed his second cabinet between 1973 and 1976.

On 8 May 1972 there was a cabinet reshuffle. The Ministry of Wages and Prices was discontinued, the Ministry of Family and Consumer Affairs was restructured as the Ministry of Consumer Affairs and Administration, and the Ministry of the Environment was established.

== Cabinet members ==
Cabinet
| Portfolio | Minister | Took office | Left office | Party |
|---|---|---|---|---|
| Prime Minister | Trygve Bratteli | 17 March 1971 | 18 October 1972 | Labour |
| Minister of Foreign Affairs | Andreas Z. Cappelen | 17 March 1971 | 18 October 1972 | Labour |
| Minister of Defence | Alv Fostervoll | 17 March 1971 | 18 October 1972 | Labour |
| Minister of Finance and Customs | Ragnar Christiansen | 17 March 1971 | 18 October 1972 | Labour |
| Minister of Justice and the Police | Oddvar Berrefjord | 17 March 1971 | 18 October 1972 | Labour |
| Minister of Industry | Finn Lied | 17 March 1971 | 18 October 1972 | Labour |
| Minister of Pay and Prices | Olav Gjærevoll | 17 March 1971 | 8 May 1972 | Labour |
| Minister of Local Government and Labour | Odvar Nordli | 17 March 1971 | 18 October 1972 | Labour |
| Minister of Social Affairs | Odd Højdahl | 17 March 1971 | 18 October 1972 | Labour |
| Minister of Transport and Communications | Reiulf Steen | 17 March 1971 | 18 October 1972 | Labour |
| Minister of Trade and Shipping; Minister of Nordic Cooperation (from 24 September 1971) | Per Kleppe | 17 March 1971 | 18 October 1972 | Labour |
| Minister of Fisheries | Knut Hoem | 17 March 1971 | 24 January 1972 | Labour |
| Minister of Fisheries | Magnus Andersen | 24 January 1972 | 18 October 1972 | Labour |
| Minister of Agriculture | Thorstein Treholt | 17 March 1971 | 18 October 1972 | Labour |
| Minister of the Environment | Olav Gjærevoll | 8 May 1972 | 18 October 1972 | Labour |
| Minister of Education and Church Affairs | Bjartmar Gjerde | 17 March 1971 | 18 October 1972 | Labour |
| Minister of Consumer Affairs and Administration (known as Minister of Family and Consumer Affairs until 8 May 1972) | Inger Louise Valle | 17 March 1971 | 18 October 1972 | Labour |

== State Secretaries ==
| Ministry | State Secretary | Period (Note: Unless otherwise noted, the period was 17 March 1971 - 18 October 1972.) | Party |
|---|---|---|---|
| Office of the Prime Minister | Oluf Fuglerud | 19 March 1971 – | Labour |
| Office of the Prime Minister | Arne Gunnar Lie | 19 March 1971 – | Labour |
| Office of the Prime Minister | Erik Himle | 19 March 1971 – 6 July 1972 | Labour |
| Office of the Prime Minister | Lasse Aasland | 1 September 1971 – | Labour |
| Office of the Prime Minister | Kjell Thorbjørn Kristensen | 7 August 1972 – 30 September 1972 | Labour |
| Ministry of Foreign Affairs | Thorvald Stoltenberg | 19 March 1971 – | Labour |
| Ministry of Finance and Customs | Juul Bjerke | 19 March 1971 – | Labour |
| Ministry of Wages and Prices | Ulf Oscar Sand | 19 March 1971 – 8 May 1972 | Labour |
| Ministry of Defence | Sverre Frogner | 26 April 1971 – | Labour |
| Ministry of Industry | Arve Johnsen | 19 March 1971 – | Labour |
| Ministry of Local Government and Labour | Leif Jørgen Aune | 19 March 1971 – | Labour |
| Ministry of Social Affairs | Torbjørn Mork | 19 March 1971 – | Labour |
| Ministry of Transport and Communications | Kåre Ellingsgård | 19 March 1971 – 22 August 1971 | Labour |
| Ministry of Trade and Shipping | Erik Andreas Ribu | 26 March 1971 – 31 August 1972 | Labour |
| Ministry of Fisheries | Sven Olsen | 26 April 1971 – 24 January 1972 | Labour |
| Ministry of Fisheries | Herlof Gjerde | 31 January 1972 – | Labour |
| Ministry of Agriculture | Hans Solberg | 19 March 1971 – | Labour |
| Ministry of the Environment | Olav Sigurd Carlsen | 15 May 1972 – | Labour |
| Ministry of Justice and Police | Elsa Rastad Bråten | 26 March 1971 – | Labour |
| Ministry of Consumer Affairs and Administration | Ulf Oscar Sand | 8 May 1972 – | Labour |
| Ministry of Church Affairs and Education | Hans Christian Ingemann Østvold | 19 April 1971 – | Labour |
