= Ingvald Rastad =

Norwegian politician

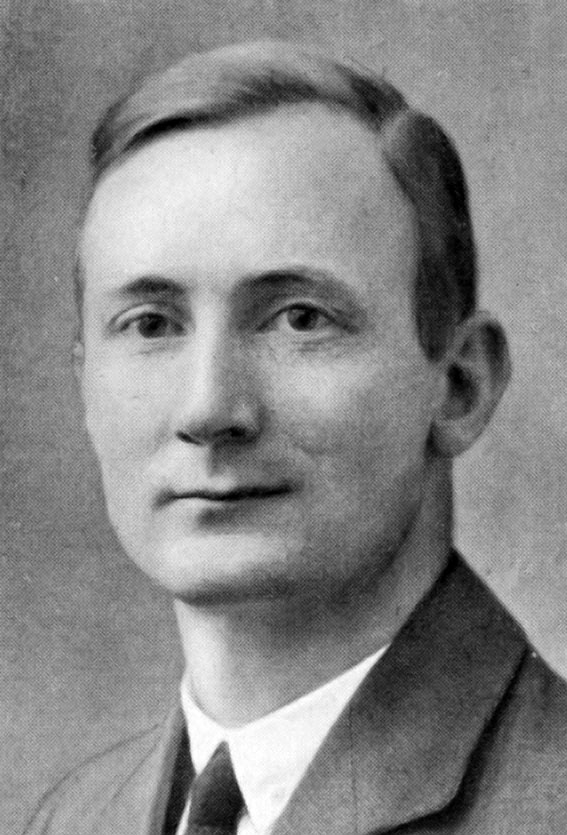
- Rastad circa 1930
- Born: Ingvald Aleksander Kristiansen Rastad; 4 November 1891; Kristiania, Norway
- Died: 1958 (aged 66–67)
- Occupations: typographer and politician
- Known for: Oslo city council (1919–1934), Parliament of Norway (1924)
- Political party: Norwegian Labour Party
- Partner: Sigrid Hilton
- Children: Elsa Rastad Bråten
- Parents: Carl Christiansen (father); Stina Anderson (mother)

Ingvald Aleksander Kristiansen Rastad (4 November 1891 – 1958) was a Norwegian typographer and politician for the Labour Party.

He was born in Kristiania as a son of mason Carl Christiansen (1855–1922) and Stina Anderson (1856–1927). In his youth he was a "young socialist" (anarchist) and edited the monthly magazine Storm from 1907 to 1910. He took typographer training at Emil Moestue, and worked as such at the book printers Brøgger Boktrykkeri, Grøndahl Boktrykkeri, Steenske Boktrykkeri and Centraltrykkeriet.

He was a member of Oslo city council from 1919 to 1934, the last four terms in the executive committee. He was elected to the Parliament of Norway from Oslo in the 1924 election, and served one term in the Standing Committee on Social Affairs.

He was a central board member of the Labour Party from 1918 to 1927. He was also a board member of Oslo Labour Party from 1918 to 1927, serving as secretary from 1920 to 1922 and chairman from 1924 to 1927. After a tenure with Amandus Holte as chairman, he had a second term as chairman from 1931 to 1933.

Together with Sigrid Hilton he had the daughter Elsa Rastad Bråten who later became a member of Parliament. He died in 1958; the main speaker at his funeral was then-Prime Minister Einar Gerhardsen.
