= Ole K. Sara =

Norwegian politician

Ole Klemet J. Sara (28 May 1936 – 29 April 2013) was a Norwegian politician for the Labour Party.

He was elected as a deputy representative to the Parliament of Norway from Finnmark in 1969, 1973 and 1977. In total he met during 16 days of parliamentary session. From 1973 to 1979 he served outside of Parliament as a State Secretary in the Ministry of Agriculture and Food, both as a part of Bratteli's Second Cabinet and Nordli's Cabinet.

He chaired the board of the Nordic Council for Reindeer Husbandry Research from 1980 to 1988 (and was then deputy chairman from 1989 to 1997), was a board member of Statens Reindriftsskole from 1981 to 1985 and the Directorate of State Forests from 1985 to 1992, member of the Broadcasting Council from 1990 to 1997 and deputy member of NLVF from 1990 to 1992.

He resided in Alta Municipality. He died in April 2013.
