= Einar Hole Moxnes =

Norwegian politician

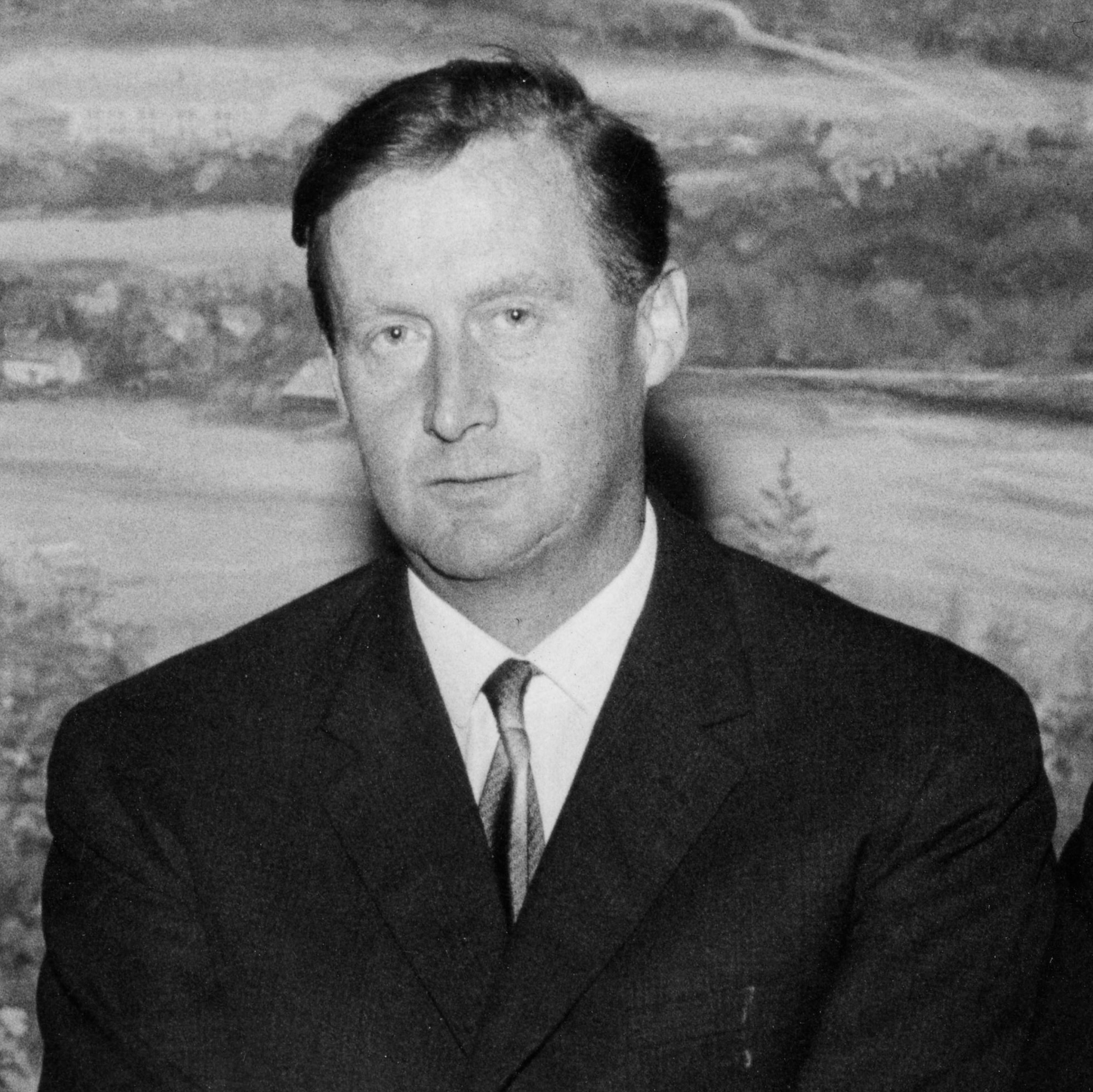
- Moxnes in 1965

County Governor of Sør-Trøndelag
- In office 1974–1986
- Monarch: Olav V
- Prime Minister: Trygve Bratteli; Odvar Nordli; Gro Harlem Brundtland; Kåre Willoch
- Preceded by: Nils Lysø
- Succeeded by: Reidar Due

Minister of Agriculture
- In office 18 October 1972 – 16 October 1973
- Prime Minister: Lars Korvald
- Preceded by: Thorstein Treholt
- Succeeded by: Thorstein Treholt

Minister of Fisheries
- In office 8 November 1968 – 17 March 1971; Acting: 22 March – 8 November 1968
- Prime Minister: Per Borten
- Preceded by: Oddmund Myklebust
- Succeeded by: Knut Hoem

Member of the Storting
- In office 1 October 1969 – 30 September 1977
- Deputy: Olina Storsand (1968–1971); Johan Syrstad (1972–1973)
- Constituency: Sør-Trøndelag

Deputy Member of the Storting
- In office 1 January 1958 – 30 September 1969
- Deputising for: Per Borten (1965–1968)
- Constituency: Sør-Trøndelag

Personal details
- Born: 11 June 1921 Alstahaug Municipality, Nordland, Norway
- Died: 20 January 2006 (aged 84) Trondheim Municipality, Sør-Trøndelag, Norway
- Party: Centre

Einar Hole Moxnes (11 June 1921 in Alstahaug Municipality – 20 January 2006 in Trondheim Municipality) was a Norwegian politician for the Centre Party.

He was elected to the Norwegian Parliament from Sør-Trøndelag in 1969, and served as a deputy representative during the terms 1958–1961, 1961–1965, 1965–1969 and 1973–1977. From 1965 to 1968 he met as a regular representative, replacing Per Borten who was Prime Minister.

He was the acting Minister of Fisheries from March to November 1968 during the cabinet Borten. On 8 November, he was formally appointed to the position. During this period he was replaced in the Norwegian Parliament by Olina Storsand. He lost the job when the cabinet Borten fell in 1971, but he returned as Minister of Agriculture from 1972 to 1973 during the cabinet Korvald. During this period he was replaced in the Norwegian Parliament by Johan Syrstad.

On the local level he was mayor of Åfjord Municipality from 1955 to 1966. From 1958 to 1963 he was also a member of Sør-Trøndelag county council. His political career ended with the position of County Governor of Sør-Trøndelag, which he held from 1974 to 1986.

Political offices
Preceded by Oddmund Myklebust	Norwegian Minister of Fisheries; 1968–1971	Succeeded by Knut Hoem
Preceded by Thorstein Treholt	Norwegian Minister of Agriculture; 1971–1972	Succeeded by Thorstein Treholt
Preceded by Nils Kristian Lysø	County Governor of Sør-Trøndelag; 1974–1986	Succeeded by Reidar Due
