= Dag Tønder =

Norwegian editor, lawyer and public official

Dag Tønder (27 June 1907–13 July 1989) was a Norwegian editor, lawyer, and public official. He served for a time as a judge in Vardø. From 1951 to 1955 he was acting county governor in Finnmark county, Norway.

== Personal life ==
Dag Tønder was born on 27 June 1907 in Sjøvegan in Salangen Municipality in Troms county, Norway. On 18 April 1935, he married Rikarda Johanne Mathisen at the Trondenes Church. He died on 13 July 1989. His family name comes from his ancestors who came from the village of Tønder in southern Denmark.

== Education and career ==
From 1951 to 1955 he was acting county governor in Finnmark county, Norway. He was serving for the Governor Peder Holt who was serving in the Cabinet of Norway at that time. During his time as acting governor, Tønder was helped found the Sámi language newspaper company Ságat. He was the chairman of the company from 15 June 1956 to 29 March 1958.

== See also ==
- Tønder (slekt), a large family history of Dag Tønder and his relatives (in Norwegian)

Government offices
Preceded by Peder Holt	Acting County Governor of Finnmark; 1951-1955; Acting for Peder Holt when he was in the Cabinet of Norway	Succeeded by Peder Holt
