= Lasse Aasland =

Norwegian politician

Lasse Aasland (15 August 1926 – 13 June 2001) was a Norwegian politician for the Labour Party.

Aasland served as a state secretary in the ministry of transport and communications from 1971 to 1972 as a part of the first cabinet of Trygve Bratteli. Later he was appointed state secretary in the ministry of defence in a reshuffle on 1 December 1974 in Trygve Bratteli's second cabinet. Aasland was in office until 15 January 1976.
