= Olav Sigurd Carlsen =

Norwegian politician

Olav Sigurd Carlsen (7 September 1930 – 14 June 2013) was a Norwegian politician for the Labour Party.

In May 1972, during Bratteli's First Cabinet, Carlsen was appointed State Secretary in the Ministry of the Environment. He lost his job when the first Bratteli cabinet fell in 1972, but returned to office from 1973 to 1974 under Bratteli's Second Cabinet.

He served as a deputy representative to the Parliament of Norway from Akershus during the term 1973–1977. He joined the Norwegian Pollution Control Authority until retirement.
