= Peder Holt =

Norwegian politician

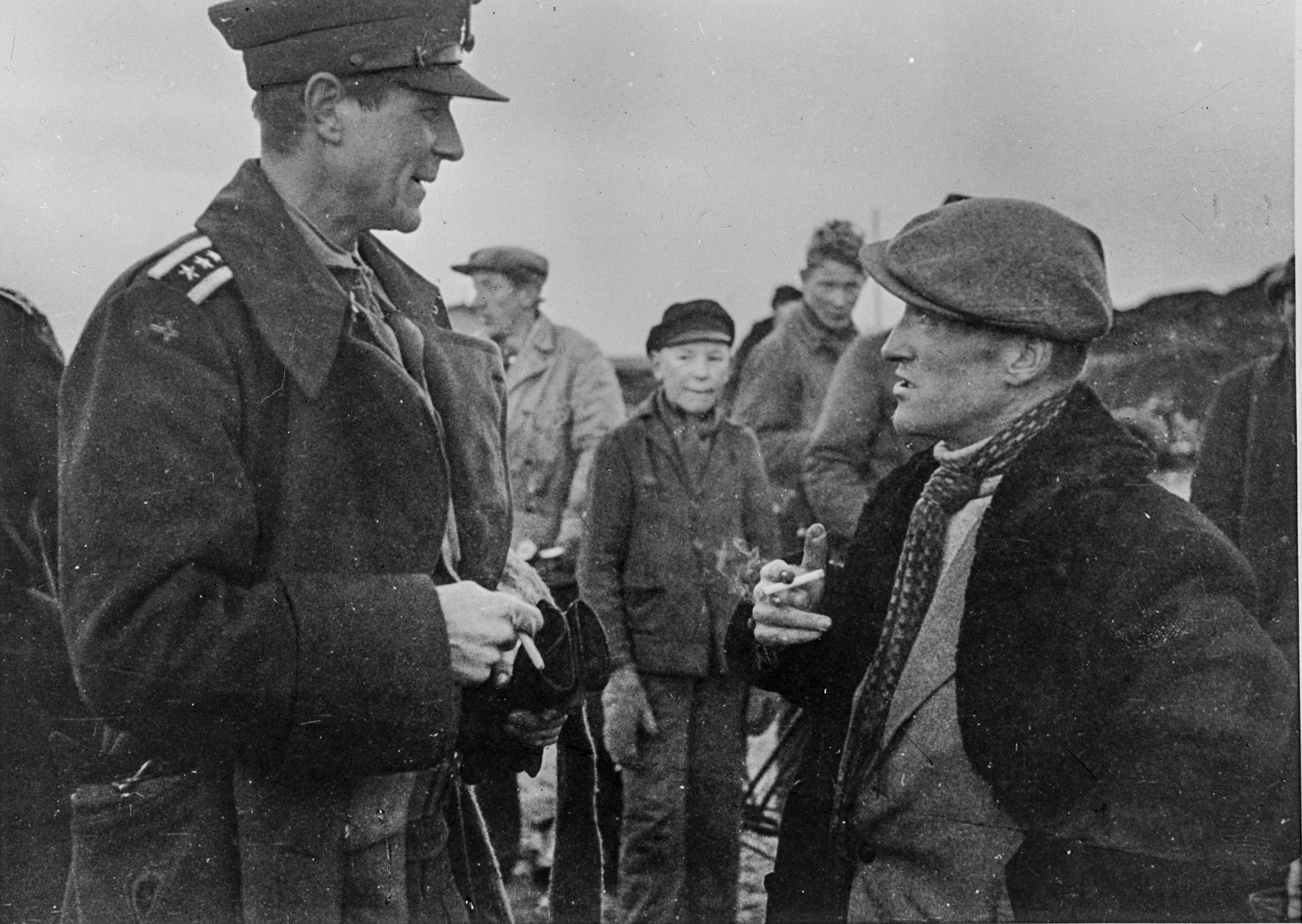
- Peder Holt (right) makes conversation Oberst A.D. Dahl in Vadsø during the Liberation of Finnmark

Governor of Finnmark
- In office 1948 – 24 March 1963
- Prime Minister: Einar Gerhardsen; Oscar Torp
- Preceded by: Hans Gabrielsen
- Succeeded by: Kolbjørn Varmann

Minister of Fisheries
- In office 19 November 1951 – 22 January 1955
- Prime Minister: Oscar Torp
- Preceded by: Reidar Carlsen
- Succeeded by: Nils Lysø

Personal details
- Born: Peder Ragnar Holt; 25 January 1899 Vardø, Finnmark, United Kingdoms of Sweden and Norway
- Died: 24 March 1963 (aged 64) Vadsø, Finnmark, Norway
- Citizenship: Norway
- Spouse(s): 1) Hedvig Ivara Gotliebsen; 2) Elisabeth Johanne Gravem
- Parents: Johannes Holt (father); Anna Marie Larsen (mother)
- Profession: Journalist and Politician

Peder Ragnar Holt (25 January 1899–24 March 1963) was a Norwegian politician for the Labour Party. He was the first person from Finnmark county to be the Governor of Finnmark, a position he held from 1948 until his death in 1963. He was instrumental in the reconstruction and rebuilding of Finnmark after World War II.

== Personal life ==
He was born in the town of Vardø in Finnmark county in the far northern part of Norway. He participated in the Left Communist Youth League's military strike action in 1924. He agitated for it through the newspaper Finmarken, and was convicted for this crime and sentenced to 50 days of light detention. He died on 24 March 1963 in the town of Vadsø where he was serving as county governor. He was a Commander of the 1st class of the Order of the Lion of Finland.

== Education and career ==
He worked in fish farming in his youth, but then he went on and got an education. He worked as the editor of the newspaper Finmarken from 1924 until 1940. He served as the mayor of Vardø Municipality from 1930 to 1940. During the occupation of Norway he was forced to resign all of his jobs (newspaper editor and mayor) because he refused to support the Nasjonal Samling government.

In 1943, Holt was drawn into the Norwegian government in exile's secret preparation for the liberation of Finnmark. On the way to such a meeting in Vadsø in May 1944, the freight vessel Holt was aboard was attacked by Soviet navy vessels, and the crew and passengers were led to Murmansk. In November the same year, while the liberation of camps throughout Øst-Finnmark continued and the Germans were burning towns, a Soviet vessel brought Holt back to Vardø. Once there, he led a three-member administration council for the liberated areas of Finnmark, according to a plan developed at a secret meeting in Tromsø the year before and approved by the government-in-exile in London. Shortly after this, Holt was named the acting County Governor of Finnmark since the actual governor, Hans Gabrielsen, was still imprisoned by the Germans. He held this post from November 1944 until September 1945. During this time, he was granted extraordinary powers for a governor and he was able to appoint municipal mayors and the county council so that the civil administration of the county could be restored quickly.

After the German occupation of Norway and the war ended, he was appointed Consultative Minister of Supplies and Reconstruction for northern Troms and Finnmark from 1945–1948 during Gerhardsen's Second Cabinet. In 1948, Governor Hans Gabrielsen was appointed as the Governor of Oppland county and Holt was appointed to replace him as the county governor of Finnmark. Several years later in 1951, he was appointed to be the Minister of Fisheries in Torp's Cabinet. Dag Tønder was installed as acting governor in Finnmark while he was in the cabinet. In 1955, he left the cabinet and resumed his duties as Governor of Finnmark, a position he held until his death in 1963.

Political offices
Preceded by Jon Andrå	Mayor of Vardø Municipality; 1930–1940	Succeeded by Erling Pedersen
Preceded by Thor Bekeng; Appointed by the Occupation government, replacing Hans Gabrielsen whom the occupation had imprisoned	Acting County Governor of Finnmark; Nov 1944–Sept 1945; Acting for Hans Gabrielsen who was imprisoned by the Germans	Succeeded by Erling Johannes Norvik; Acting for Hans Gabrielsen
Preceded by Hans Gabrielsen	County Governor of Finnmark; 1948–1963; On leave from 1951-1955 while he was in the Cabinet. Dag Tønder was acting governor during that time.	Succeeded by Kolbjørn Varmann
Preceded by Reidar Karlsen	Norwegian Minister of Fisheries; 1951–1955	Succeeded by Nils Kristian Lysø
