= Johan Skipnes =

Norwegian politician (1909–2005)

Minister of Local Government
- In office 18 October 1972 – 16 October 1973
- Prime Minister: Lars Korvald
- Preceded by: Odvar Nordli
- Succeeded by: Leif Aune

Personal details
- Born: Johan Kristoffer Winther Skipnes; 18 December 1909 Aure Municipality
- Died: 12 March 2005 (aged 95) Molde Municipality, Norway
- Party: Christian Democratic

Johan Kristoffer Winther Skipnes (18 December 1909 – 12 March 2005) was a Norwegian politician for the Christian Democratic Party.

He was born in Aure Municipality.

He served in the position of deputy representative to the Norwegian Parliament from Møre og Romsdal during the term 1954–1957. He was later the Minister of Local Government and Work Affairs in 1972–1973 during the cabinet Korvald.

On the local level he held various positions in the municipal council for Molde Municipality from 1945 to 1975, serving as mayor during the terms 1962–1963, 1963–1965 and 1971–1973. From 1963 to 1967 he was also a member of Møre og Romsdal county council, serving as county mayor from 1963 to 1964 and in 1975.

Political offices
Preceded by Odvar Nordli	Norwegian Minister of Local Government; 1972–1973	Succeeded by Leif Jørgen Aune
