= Eivind Bolle =

Norwegian politician (1923–2012)

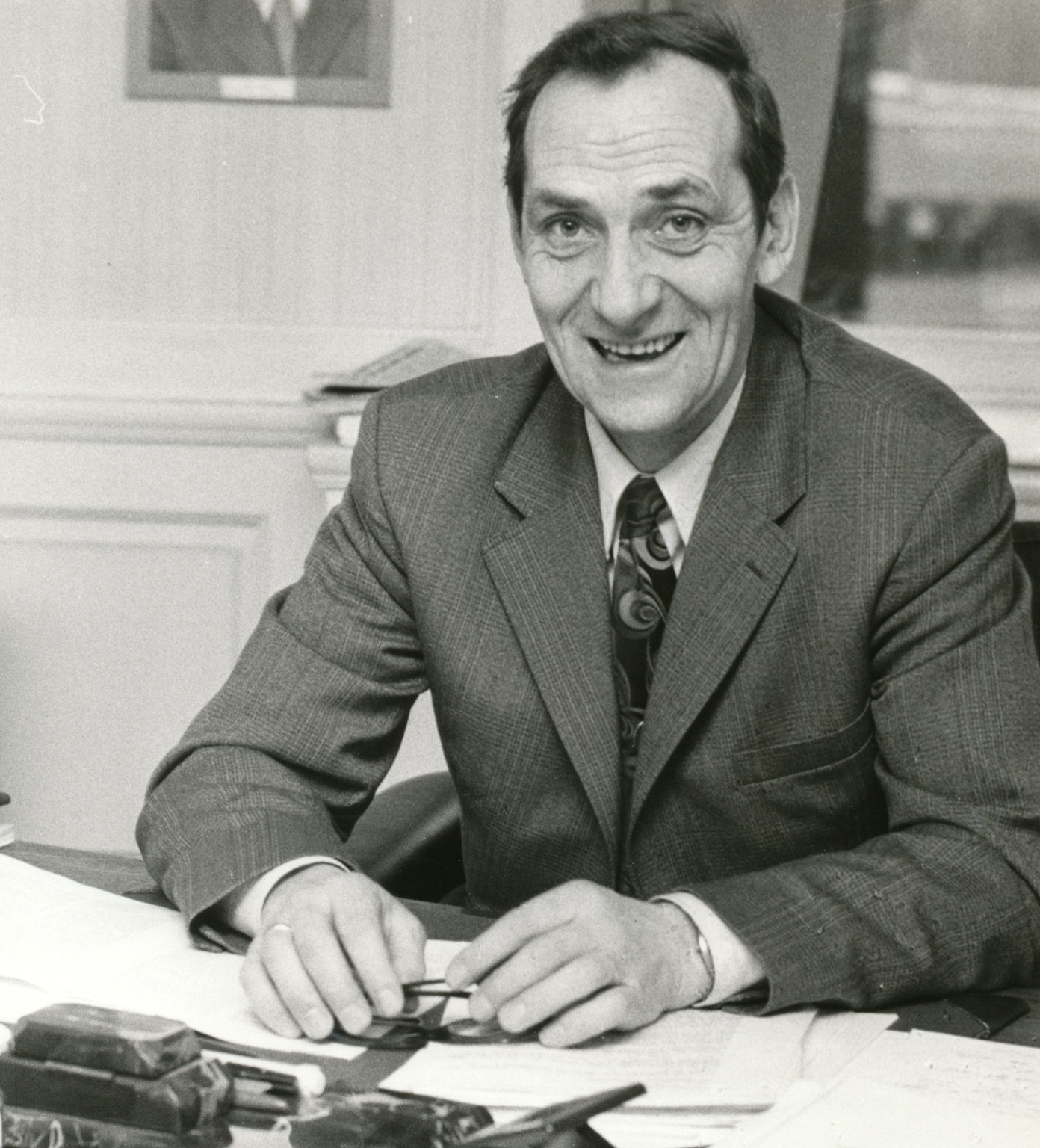

Minister of Fisheries
- In office 16 October 1973 – 14 October 1981
- Prime Minister: Trygve Bratteli; Odvar Nordli; Gro Harlem Brundtland
- Preceded by: Trygve Olsen
- Succeeded by: Thor Listau

Mayor of Vestvågøy Municipality
- In office 1 January 1972 – 16 October 1973
- Preceded by: Karl Leirfall
- Succeeded by: Johs. Sundrønning

Member of the Storting
- In office 1 October 1973 – 30 September 1985
- Deputy: Eindride Sommerseth; Karl Ingebrigtsen; Finn Knutsen
- Constituency: Nordland

Deputy Member of Storting
- In office 1 October 1969 – 30 September 1973
- Constituency: Nordland

Personal details
- Born: Eivind Albin Andreas Bolle; 13 October 1923 Hol Municipality, Norway
- Died: 10 June 2012 (aged 88)
- Party: Labour

Eivind Albin Andreas Bolle (13 October 1923 – 10 June 2012) was a Norwegian politician for the Labour Party. He was born in Hol Municipality.

He was elected to the Norwegian Parliament from Nordland in 1973, and was re-elected on two occasions. He had previously served as a deputy representative during the term 1969–1973. He was the Minister of Fisheries from 1973 to 1981 during three different cabinets: second cabinet Bratteli, cabinet Nordli and first cabinet Brundtland. During these three periods he was replaced in the Parliament by Eindride Sommerseth, Karl Ingebrigtsen and Finn Knutsen respectively.

On the local level he was a member of the municipal council for Hol Municipality from 1959 to 1963, and later he was part of the municipal council for Vestvågøy Municipality, the successor municipality after Hol Municipality was dissolved. He served as mayor of Vestvågøy Municipality from 1971 to 1973, during which term he was also a member of Nordland county council.

Outside politics he worked as a fisher from 1938 to 1974.

Political offices
Preceded by Trygve Olsen	Norwegian Minister of Fisheries; 1973–1981	Succeeded by Thor Listau
