= Steinar Eriksen =

Norwegian businessperson and politician (born 1939)

- Born: 1939 (age 86–87)
- Education: Kvænangen Municipality
- Occupations: businessperson and politician

Steinar Eriksen (born 22 May 1939) is a Norwegian businessperson and politician for the Conservative Party. He was a two-term MP.

He was born in Kvænangen Municipality. After taking his realartium at Finnmark offentlige gymnas in 1958 he studied at BI from 1961 to 1963. He was then hired as an office worker in Norsk Phillips, before moving on to Honningsvåg in 1966 to work as manager at NOFI-Honningsvåg until 1981.

He became chairman of the local trade and service association in 1976, and advanced to countywide chair from 1980 to 1982. In 1979 he was elected to the municipal council of Nordkapp Municipality, and was selected for the executive committee. He also assumed the chairmanship of Nordkapp Conservative Party.

He was then elected as a deputy representative to the Parliament of Norway from Finnmark in 1981, leaving his local posts. As the regular representative Thor Listau was named to Willoch's First Cabinet, Eriksen filled his seat the entire four-year term. In 1985 Eriksen was elected as a regular representative, and served four more years. He moved to Bærum while serving as an MP, where he chaired the borough branch of the Conservative Party in Hosle (1982–1986, 1989–1993).

After leaving national politics Eriksen was hired as an office manager in the Norwegian Public Roads Administration in 1989. He was promoted to financial director in 1994, then director of ferries in 1998 which he remained until his retirement in 2004. Eriksen chaired NOFI-Honningsvåg from 1982 to 1989 (board member since 1976), was a board member of NOFI-Bergen from 1980 to 1982; and several other companies.
