= Amandus Holte =

Norwegian trade unionist and politician

Amandus Holte (24 September 1888 – 15 December 1965) was a Norwegian trade unionist and politician for the Labour Party.

He was born in Kristiania as a son of baker Amund Holte and Ingeborg Isaksen. He was a laborer in the factories E. Sunde & Co, C. Blunck, Skabo Jernbanevognfabrik and Wisbech. He was a deputy chair and chair of the trade union Metallarbeidernes forening, and later a board member of the Norwegian Union of Iron and Metalworkers. He was also a supervisory council member of Oslo faglige samorg from 1925 to 1926. From 1931 he was employed as the secretary of the Norwegian Union of Iron and Metalworkers.

He was a supervisory council member of Oslo Labour Party from 1918, deputy chair from 1926 and chairman from 1929 to 1930. He succeeded and was succeeded by Ingvald Rastad. Furthermore, he was a central board member of the Labour Party from 1925 to 1927, and also a city councilman in Oslo.

In 1924 he was the sixth ballot candidate for the Labour Party in the parliamentary election. He was elected as a third deputy. In the 1930 election he was again elected as third deputy, and met in parliamentary session in 1933.

He died in December 1965, and was buried at Østre gravlund.
