= Erling Johannes Norvik =

Norwegian politician

Acting Governor of Finnmark
- In office 1945–1945
- Preceded by: Peder Holt
- Succeeded by: Hans Gabrielsen

Member of the Norwegian Parliament for Kjøpstedene i Nordland, Troms og Finnmark (representative #4)
- In office 1950–1953
- Prime Minister: Einar Gerhardsen (1950-1951); Oscar Torp (1951-1953)

Member of the Norwegian Parliament for Finnmark (representative #4)
- In office 1954–1957
- Prime Minister: Oscar Torp (1954-1955); Einar Gerhardsen (1955-1957)

Member of the Norwegian Parliament for Finnmark (representative #3)
- In office 1958–1961
- Prime Minister: Einar Gerhardsen (1958-1961)

Personal details
- Born: 27 April 1899 Trondenes, Norway
- Died: 27 November 1964 (aged 65) Vadsø, Norway
- Citizenship: Norway
- Party: Conservative Party
- Spouse: Andrea Esbensen
- Children: Erling Norvik
- Parents: Peder Norvik (father); Lea Margrethe Hansen (mother)
- Profession: Politician

Erling Johannes Norvik (27 April 1899–27 November 1964) was a Norwegian politician for the Conservative Party. He was a member of the Norwegian Parliament and was briefly the acting County Governor of Finnmark county from September 1945 until November 1945 at the end of World War II.

== Personal life ==
He was born to Peder Norvik and Lea Margrethe Hansen on 27 April 1899 in Trondenes Municipality in Troms county, Norway. He was married to Andrea Esbensen. Erling Norvik is their son. Erling Johannes Norvik died on 27 November 1964 in Vadsø Municipality in Finnmark county, Norway at the age of 64.

== Education and career ==
He graduated from the Trondhjems Handelsgymnasium school in 1917. Norvik was very active in politics. He chaired the local Conservative Party chapter several times (1925-1926, 1939-1940, 1948), as well as the regional chapter (1948-1952). He was also a member of the national Conservative Party board from 1950 to 1961.

He began his career as a clerk for the Finnmark County Municipality in 1918. He later became a secretary for the county tax administration office in Finnmark from 1926-1935. Norvik was a member of the municipal council of Vadsø Municipality from 1931 to 1936. After the occupation of Norway was ended there was no government in Finnmark county, so he was appointed to temporarily be the county governor from September to November 1945. Shortly after that, he was appointed to the executive committee which ran Vadsø Municipality from 1947–1951. Norvik was head of the tax office in Finnmark from 1948-1962.

He was elected to the Norwegian Parliament for the Conservative Party for the constituency of the "Market towns of Nordland, Troms and Finnmark" for the term from 1950-1953. In 1953, he was re-elected, but for the constituency of Finnmark county. He was reelected in 1957 to represent Finnmark. He was also member of the Supervisory Board of Norges Bank from 1957-1964.

Government offices
Preceded by Peder Holt; Acting for Hans Gabrielsen	Acting County Governor of Finnmark; Sept 1945–Nov 1945	Succeeded by Hans Gabrielsen
