= Oddmund Myklebust =

Norwegian politician

Minister of Fisheries
- In office 12 October 1965 – 8 November 1968
- Prime Minister: Per Borten
- Preceded by: Magnus Andersen
- Succeeded by: Einar Moxnes

Personal details
- Born: 21 April 1915 Sandøy Municipality, Møre og Romsdal, Norway
- Died: 14 September 1972 (aged 57)
- Party: Centre

Oddmund Myklebust (21 April 1915 – 14 September 1972) was a Norwegian fisher and politician for the Centre Party.

He was born in Sandøy Municipality.

In 1965 he was appointed Minister of Fisheries in the centre-right cabinet Borten. He remained in this position until the 8 November 1968, being replaced by Einar Hole Moxnes.

Myklebust was involved in local politics in Haram Municipality from 1945 to 1953 and 1963 to 1965, and in Sandøy Municipality from 1971 to 1972.

Political offices
Preceded by Magnus Andersen	Minister of Fisheries (Norway); 1965–1968	Succeeded by Einar Hole Moxnes
