= Bodil Skjånes Dugstad =

Norwegian politician (1927–2021)

Bodil Skjånes Dugstad (23 May 1927 – 6 February 2021) was a Norwegian politician for the Labour Party.

Dugstad was born in Trondheim. She served as a deputy representative to the Norwegian Parliament from Sør-Trøndelag during the term 1973–1977. From 1973 to 1975, during the second cabinet Bratteli, Dugstad was appointed State Secretary in the Ministry of Church Affairs and Education.
