= Oluf Fuglerud =

Norwegian journalist and politician (1924–2019)

Oluf Fuglerud (17 August 1924 – 2 August 2019) was a Norwegian journalist and politician for the Labour Party.

He was born in Fåberg Municipality. After finishing his secondary education in 1945, he graduated from the University of Manchester. He was a subeditor in Vårt Blad, journalist in Arbeiderbladet and Akershus Arbeiderblad. He was a press consultant at the Office of the Prime Minister from 1963, secretary in the Labour Party parliamentary caucus from 1966, then State Secretary in the Office of the Prime Minister as a member of Bratteli's First Cabinet and Bratteli's Second Cabinet (1971–1972, 1973–1976).

Fuglerud was also an elected politician, as a member of the municipal council of Lørenskog Municipality and from 1964 to 1967 chair of Lørenskog school board. From 1976 to 1990 he worked as the information director of Norol.

He resided at Fjellhamar, later at Finstadjordet. He died in 2019.
