= Olina Storsand =

Norwegian politician (1922–2021)

- Born: 17 July 1922; Hemne Municipality, Norway
- Died: 18 December 2021 (aged 99); Trondheim, Norway
- Occupation: politician
- Years active: 1967–1979
- Known for: deputy representative to the Parliament of Norway
- Political party: Centre Party

Olina Storsand (17 July 1922 – 18 December 2021) was a Norwegian politician for the Centre Party.

Storsand was born in Hemne Municipality. Storsand served as a deputy representative to the Parliament of Norway from Sør-Trøndelag in the terms 1965–1969, 1969–1973 and 1973–1977. During the second term she was brought in as a replacement representative for Einar Hole Moxnes, while Moxnes was appointed to the Cabinet. Storsand sat as a regular representative until March 1971, when the cabinet of which Hole Moxnes was a part was dissolved, allowing him to return to his Parliament seat.

On the local level Storsand was elected to the municipal council for Trondheim Municipality between 1967 and 1983, serving as deputy mayor during the term 1975–1979. From 1981 to 1989 she was a member of the Arts Council Norway.

She died in Trondheim on 18 December 2021, at the age of 99.
