= Karl Ingebrigtsen =

Norwegian politician (1935–2021)

- Born: 9 December 1935; Hattfjelldal, Norway
- Died: 28 April 2021 (aged 85)
- Occupation: Politician

Karl Ingebrigtsen (9 December 1935 – 28 April 2021) was a Norwegian politician for the Labour Party.

He was born in Hattfjelldal Municipality to farmers Inge Ingebrigtsen and Marie Bergsnev. He served as a deputy representative to the Parliament of Norway from Nordland for the periods 1973–1977 and 1977–1981. During most of his second term, he met as a full representative while Eivind Bolle was a member of cabinet. Ingebrigtsen was then elected as a full representative for the term 1981–1985.
