= Kai Ekanger =

Norwegian jurist and politician (1929–2018)

Kai Ekanger (18 July 1929 – 23 May 2018) was a Norwegian jurist and politician for the Labour Party.

Ekanger resided at Bøler in Oslo since that neighborhood was built in the 1950s. He took the cand.jur. degree, worked as a junior solicitor and then as a secretary in the Norwegian Public Roads Administration. From 1971 to 1985 he was a lawyer for the Norwegian Confederation of Trade Unions, then office manager in the Norwegian Public Roads Directorate.

From 1973 to 1979, during Bratteli's Second Cabinet and Nordli's Cabinet, Ekanger was appointed State Secretary in the Ministry of Justice and the Police. He served as a deputy representative to the Parliament of Norway from Oslo during the term 1997–2001. In total he met during 97 days of parliamentary session. He was also a member of Oslo city council for three terms, and led Bøler borough council 1975–79 and 1987–89. In 2004 he received the King's Medal of Merit in gold.
