= Regional Development Fund =

- Company type: Government agency
- Industry: Banking
- Founded: 1961
- Defunct: 1993
- Headquarters: Oslo, Norway
- Key people: Reidar Carlsen, Leif Aune, Terje Stubberud

The Regional Development Fund (Norwegian: Distriktenes utbyggingsfond, DU) was a national development bank in Norway tasked with promoting regional development by counselling, loans and subsidies. The fund was established in 1961 and existed until 1993, when it was merged with the Industry Bank and the Industry Fund to form the Norwegian Industrial and Regional Development Fund. In 2004, the Norwegian Industrial and Regional Development Fund was merged with other agencies to form Innovation Norway.

The Regional Development Fund was headquartered in Oslo.

== Directors of the Regional Development Fund ==
- Reidar Carlsen (1961–78)
- Leif Aune (1978–90)
- Terje Stubberud (1991–92)
