= Nils Lysø =

Norwegian politician (1905–1977)

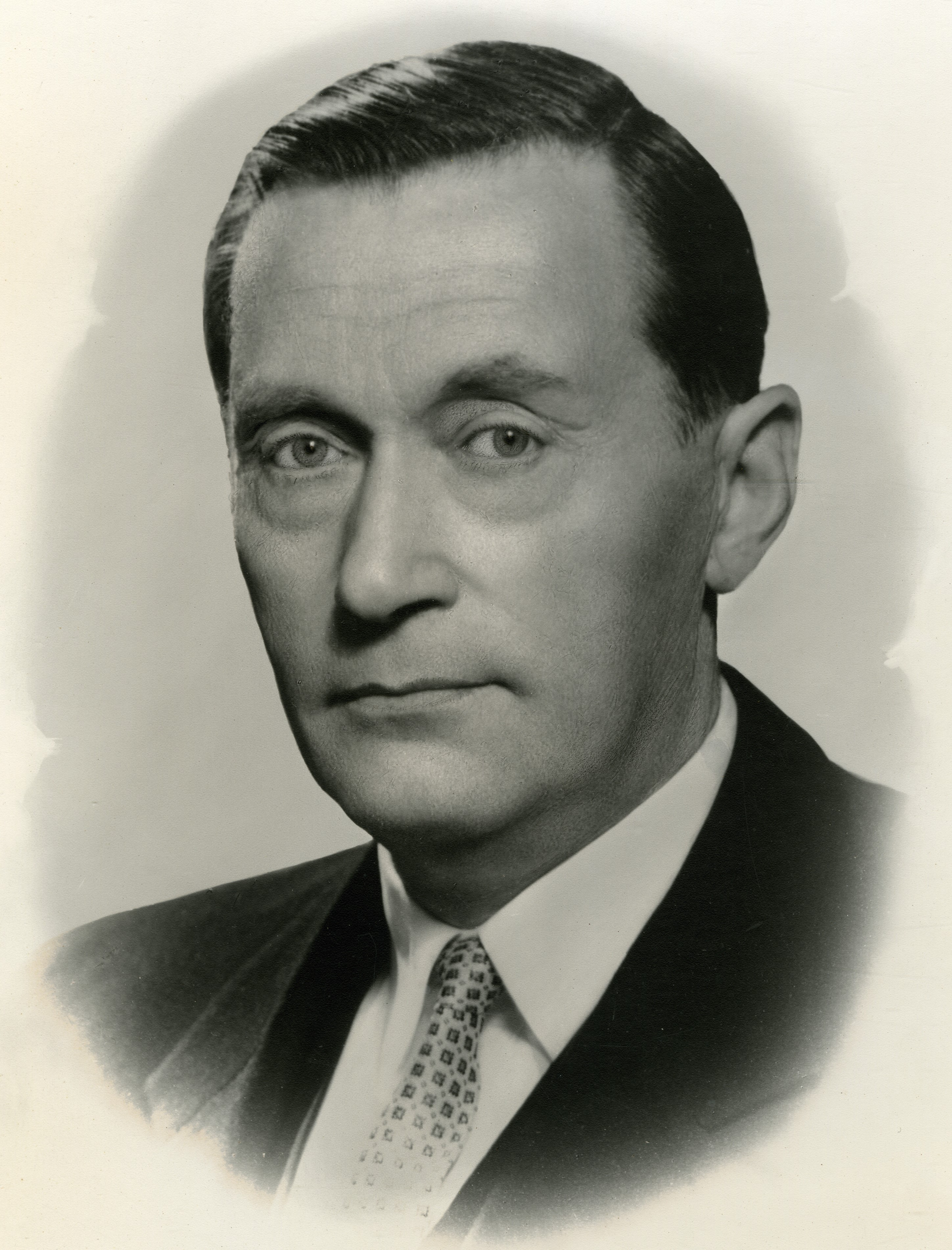
- Lysø in 1953.

County Governor of Sør-Trøndelag
- In office 1963–1974
- Preceded by: Thor Skrindo
- Succeeded by: Einar Moxnes

Minister of Fisheries
- In office 22 January 1955 – 28 August 1963
- Prime Minister: Einar Gerhardsen
- Preceded by: Peder Holt
- Succeeded by: Onar Onarheim

Member of the Norwegian Parliament
- In office 1 January 1958 – 30 September 1965
- Constituency: Sør-Trøndelag

Personal details
- Born: Nils Kristian Lysø; 3 September 1905 Jøssund, Norway
- Died: 7 July 1977 (aged 71)
- Party: Labour

Nils Kristian Lysø (born 3 September 1905 in Jøssund, died 7 July 1977) was a Norwegian politician for the Labour Party.

He was elected to the Norwegian Parliament from Sør-Trøndelag in 1958, and was re-elected on one occasion. He had previously served as a deputy representative during the terms 1950–1953 and 1954–1957.

He was the Minister of Fisheries from 1955 to 1963 during the third cabinet Gerhardsen. During this period he was replaced in the Norwegian Parliament by Jenny Lund.

On the local level he was a member of Jøssund municipality council from 1936 to 1954, serving as mayor from 1945 to 1953. From 1945 to 1955 he was also a member of Sør-Trøndelag county council. His political career ended with the position of County Governor of Sør-Trøndelag, which he held from 1963 to 1974.

Political offices
Preceded by Peder Holt	Norwegian Minister of Fisheries; 1955–1963	Succeeded by Onar Onarheim
Preceded by Thor Skrindo	County Governor of Sør-Trøndelag; 1963–1974	Succeeded by Einar Hole Moxnes
