= Jenny Lund (politician) =

Norwegian politician (1916–1998)

- Born: 15 February 1916; Ålen Municipality, Norway
- Died: 17 February 1998 (aged 82)
- Occupation: Politician

Jenny Lund (15 February 1916 – 17 February 1998) was a Norwegian politician.

She was elected deputy representative to the Storting for the periods 1954–1957, 1958–1961, 1961–1965 and 1965–1969 for the Labour Party. She replaced Nils Kristian Lysø at the Storting from January 1958 to August 1963, and Olav Gjærevoll in October 1965.

== Personal life ==
Lund was born in Ålen Municipality to shoemaker Rasmus Saksgård and Marie Bengtzon.
