= Onar Onarheim =

Norwegian politician

Minister of Fisheries
- In office 28 August 1963 – 25 September 1963
- Prime Minister: John Lyng
- Preceded by: Nils Lysø
- Succeeded by: Magnus Andersen

Member of the Norwegian Parliament
- In office 1 October 1961 – 30 September 1969
- Constituency: Hordaland

Personal details
- Born: Onar Selmer Onarheim; 15 October 1910 Kvinnherad Municipality, Hordaland, Norway
- Died: 2 April 1988 (aged 77) Stord Municipality, Hordaland, Norway
- Party: Conservative
- Spouse: Borghild Lauritzdatter Aas
- Children: 2 (adopted)

Onar Selmer Onarheim (15 October 1910 – 2 April 1988) was a Norwegian politician for the Conservative Party. He was born in Kvinnherad Municipality.

Onarheim served in the position of deputy representative to the Norwegian Parliament from Hordaland, during the terms 1961–1965 and 1965–1969. From August to September 1963, he served as the Minister of Fisheries during the short-lived centre-right cabinet Lyng.

Onarheim was a member of the municipal council for Stord Municipality from 1947 to 1964 and 1979 to 1983, serving as mayor since 1954 and deputy mayor in 1982–1983.

Onar Onarheim had two adopted children, Onar Onarheim Jr. and Torunn Onarheim Staurset.

Preceded by Nils Kristian Lysø	Minister of Fisheries (Norway); August 1963–September 1963	Succeeded by Magnus Andersen
