= Vladimir Shcherbakov (general) =

Soviet Army general (1901–1981)

Vladimir Ivanovich Shcherbakov
- Щербаков, Владимир Иванович
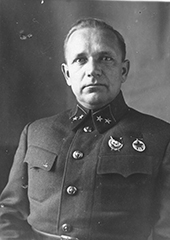
- Born: 14 July 1901; Oryol Governorate (today in the Izmalkovsky District in Lipetsk Oblast), Russian Empire
- Died: 4 November 1981 (aged 80); Leningrad, Soviet Union
- Military career
- Allegiance: Soviet Union
- Branch: Red Army
- Service years: 1919–1957
- Rank: Lieutenant general
- Conflicts: Russian Civil War; World War II
- Awards: Order of Lenin

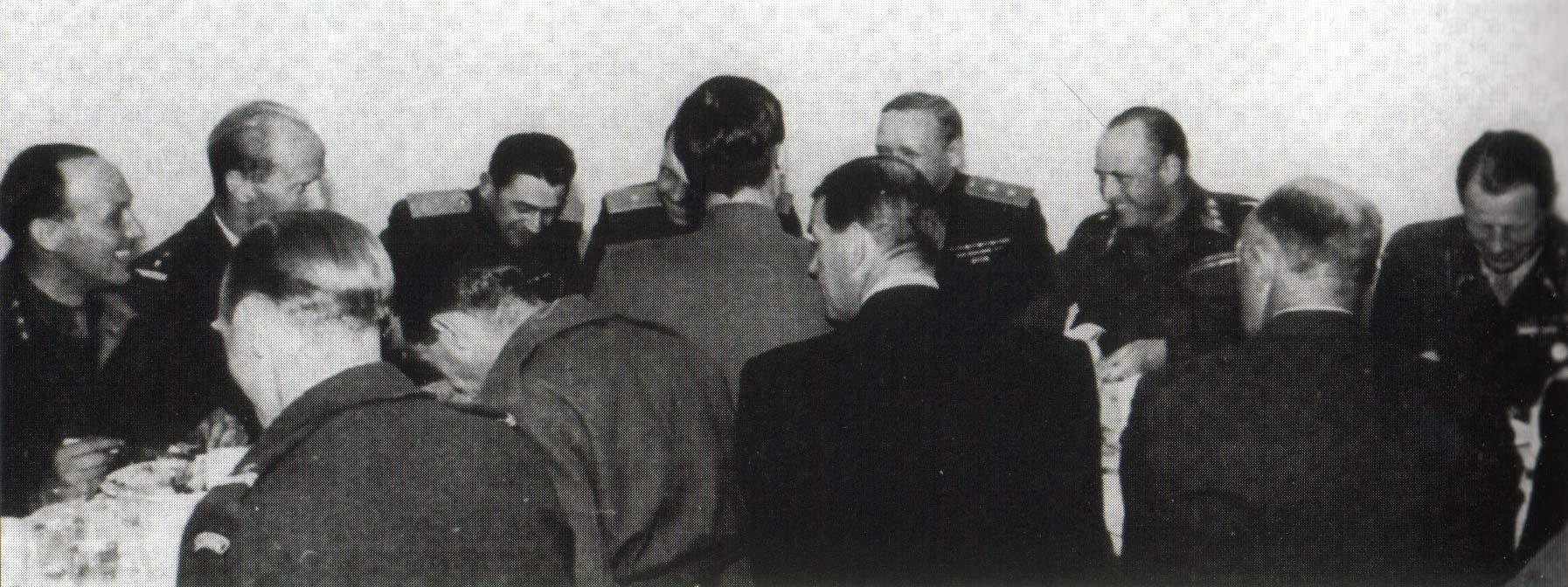
Vladimir Shcherbakov, then commander of the Soviet forces in Norway, third from the right in the second row, at an official dinner in Kirkenes, Norway in July 1945. On his left, Prince Olav of Norway.

Vladimir Ivanovich Shcherbakov (Russian: Щербаков, Владимир Иванович; 14 July 1901 – 4 November 1981) was a Soviet general of the Red Army during World War II.

== Biography ==
Born in a village in the Oryol Governorate (today in the Izmalkovsky District in Lipetsk Oblast), Shcherbakov entered the Red Army in 1919 by attending the officers course of the South-Western Front in Serpukhov. As part of the course, he participated in the fighting against the forces of General Denikin in the Kalach-na-Donu area in the period May–June 1919, and subsequently against the Cossack Mamontov Raid in the Yelets region. In July 1920 he took part in the Soviet-Polish War, fighting against the Poles and the Ukrainian forces of Simon Petlyura with the south-western front of General Yegorov, reaching the rank of company commander.

In 1939-1940, as commander of the 104th Mountain Rifle Division of the 14th Army, Shcherbakov took part in the Winter War, in the Arctic sector of the front. He led his unit in the occupation of the Rybachy Peninsula, the city of Petsamo, the port of Liinahamari and the locality of Luostari on the border with Norway. For the skill shown in the conduct of the 104th division, Shcherbakov was awarded the Order of the Red Banner.

In January 1941 Shcherbakov was appointed commander of the 50th Rifle Corps of the 23rd Army of the Northern Front on the Karelian Isthmus. At the beginning of the German invasion he became commander of the 42nd Army, then still under formation, with which in August 1941 he was engaged in the defense of the Koporye Bay, on the Leningrad front, where he was wounded in combat. Between 1 and 24 September 1941 he commanded the 8th Army, in defense of the Oranienbaum Bridgehead during the battles to block the German advance towards Leningrad. On 24 September he was removed from office, on the orders of Generals Georgy Zhukov and Andrei Zhdanov, because he was deemed "unsuitable for the role" and passed to command of the 11th Rifle Division in the same 8th Army.

As commander of the 11th Division, Shcherbakov fought bravely, so in February 1942 he was again awarded the Order of the Red Banner and on 6 March of the same year he was promoted to command the 14th Army, a command which he would hold until the end of the war. With his army, he was engaged in the far north of Russia in defending the region between Murmansk, Kandalaksha and Uhtua against numerically superior German and Finnish forces, and managed to prevent the Nazis from capturing Murmansk and the railway that connected the city to the rest of Russia. For his valor as commander of the 14th Army, in 1943 he was promoted to the rank of general in the army corps. In the autumn of 1944 he led the 14th Army in the victorious Petsamo-Kirkenes Offensive, driving the German troops out of Soviet territory, capturing the Finnish port city of Petsamo, and liberating the far north of Norway including the town of Kirkenes.

After the end of the war, Shcherbakov was first appointed deputy commander of the Baltic Military District and then commander of Arkhangelsk Military District. In 1949 he passed to the command of the Gorky Military District and in 1953 became deputy commander of the Voronezh Military District. In 1957 he retired from service and was elected deputy at the III convocation of the Supreme Soviet of the USSR. He died in Leningrad on November 4, 1981.

== Sources ==
- Generals.dk
- Pamyat naroda
- encyclopedia.mil.ru
