= Kjell Thorbjørn Kristensen =

Norwegian politician

Kjell Thorbjørn Kristensen (14 February 1927 – 26 February 1995) was a Norwegian politician for the Labour Party.

From August to September 1972, during Bratteli's First Cabinet, Kristensen was a State Secretary in the Office of the Prime Minister. He served as a deputy representative to the Norwegian Parliament from Telemark during the terms 1958–1961 and 1961–1965.
