= Liberation of Finnmark =

Campaign during World War II in Scandinavia

- Part of the European theatre of World War II
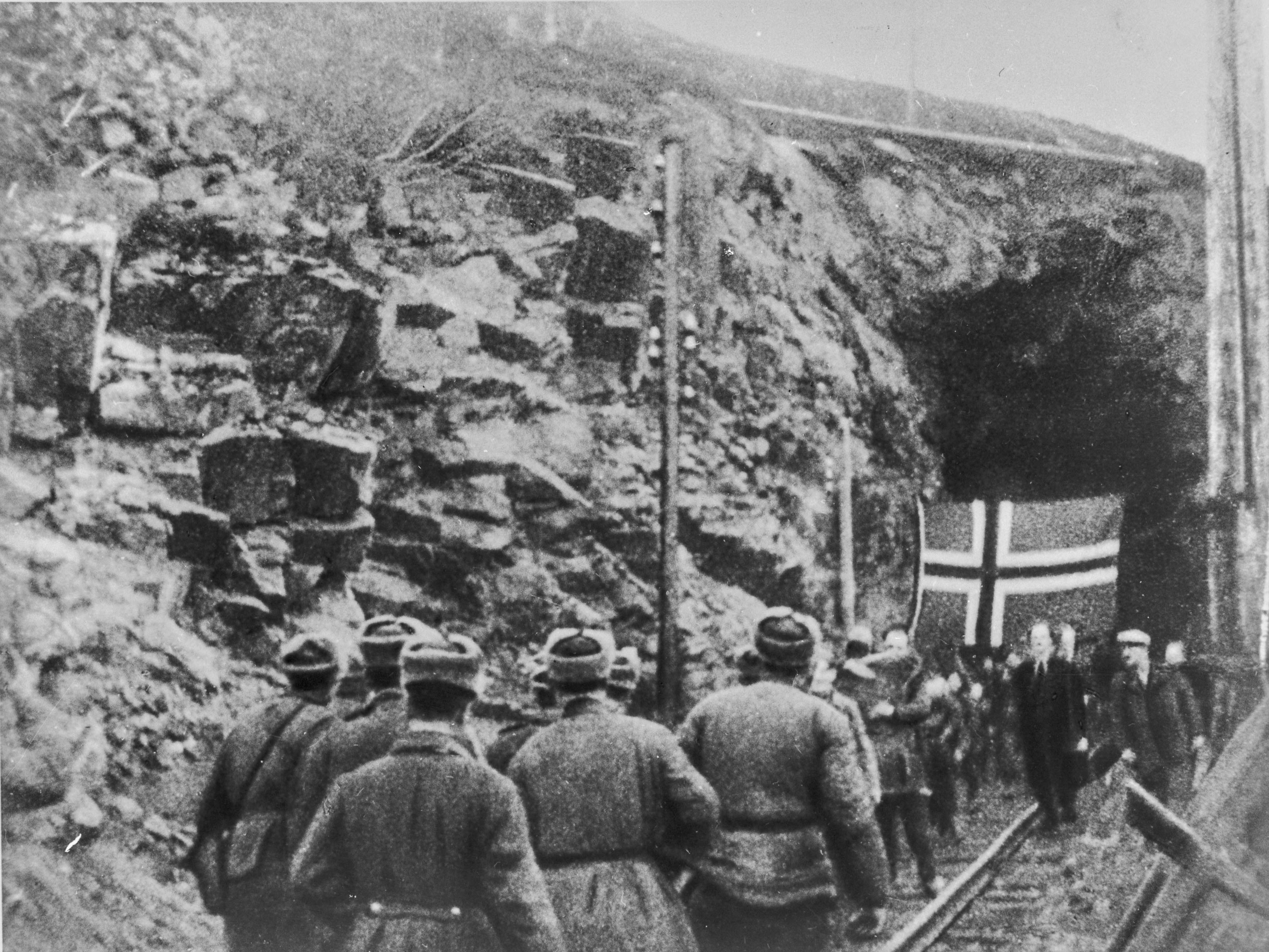
- Soviets meet Norwegians sheltering in a mine in Finnmark
Date	23 October 1944 – 26 April 1945
Location	Finnmark, Norway
Result	Allied victory
Territorial changes	Finnmark liberated; German withdrawal into Festung Norwegen

Belligerents
Soviet Union; Norway; Naval support: United Kingdom; Canada; Material support: Sweden	Germany; Quisling Government

Commanders and leaders
(Soviet Union) Kirill Meretskov (Soviet Union) Vladimir Shcherbakov (Soviet Union) Arseny Golovko (Norway) Arne Dagfin Dahl	(Nazi Germany) Lothar Rendulic (Nazi Germany) Franz Böhme

Strength
Soviet Union: 14th Army; Northern Fleet; Norway: 3,000+ soldiers & police troops 1,500+ militia 2 corvettes 3 minesweepers Various auxiliary vessels United Kingdom: 3 destroyers Canada: 1 destroyer	20th Mountain Army: 2nd Mountain Division; 6th Mountain Division

Casualties and losses
Soviet Union: ~2,900 killed Norway: 10 killed 14 captured 1 corvette sunk 6 fishing vessels destroyed	Unknown
- Over 300 civilians died evacuating Finnmark

The Liberation of Finnmark was an Allied military operation lasting from 23 October 1944 until 26 April 1945, in which Soviet and Norwegian forces wrested away control of Finnmark, the northernmost county of Norway, from Germany. It began with a Soviet offensive that liberated Kirkenes.

== Background ==
After the occupation of Norway, the Norwegian government-in-exile established a military mission in Moscow under the leadership of Colonel Arne Dagfin Dahl. Anticipating the end of World War II, the United States, the United Kingdom, and the Soviet Union signed an agreement with the Norwegians on 17 March 1944 concerning the administration of Norwegian territory should it be occupied by one of the other three parties. The agreement stipulated that military authorities would have ultimate control over civil administration as long as conflict persisted.

Finnmark, in red

After the Moscow Armistice between the Soviet Union and Finland on 4 September 1944, the Petsamo region, still largely occupied by the Germans, was ceded to the Soviet Union, and the Finnish government agreed to remove the remaining German forces from their own territory by 15 September (leading to the Lapland War). During the retreat of the German 20th Mountain Army, called Operation Birke, the decision was made by the Oberkommando der Wehrmacht to withdraw completely from northern Norway and Finland in Operation Nordlicht. While the Germans prepared for this operation, the Soviets decided to seize the offensive initiative on the Karelian Front.

The Stavka decided to move against the German forces in the Arctic in late 1944. The operation was to be undertaken jointly by the Karelian Front under the command of General Kirill Meretskov and the Northern Fleet under Admiral Arseniy Golovko. The main operations were to be conducted by the 14th Army, led by Lieutenant General Vladimir Shcherbakov, which had been in the Arctic since the beginning of the war. Spearheading the offensive would be the 10th Guards Division, led by Major General Khudalov.

Soviet Air Forces had been attacking German positions in Finnmark since at least that February. Hammerfest was first attacked on 14 February 1944. On 23 August, they bombed the town of Vadsø, which had been sheltering around 2,000 German soldiers. Hammerfest was bombed a second time on 29 August. Heavily damaged, what remained of the settlements would be almost entirely destroyed during the German withdrawal in following months.

Soviet preparations, which had lasted for two months, had not gone unnoticed by the Germans. General Lothar Rendulic, who served as both head of the 20th Mountain Army and overall theater commander, was aware of the threat posed by the upcoming offensive. Prior to the start of the Soviet attack, the defending Germans had been ordered to abandon Petsamo on 15 October, and Kirkenes by the beginning of November. To stall the Soviets, the Germans enacted a scorched earth policy and began to sabotage local infrastructure and destroy villages in the vicinity. Thousands of civilians from Finnmark and northern Troms were forcibly evacuated to southern Norway. Between 43,000 and 45,000 Norwegian civilians were forced out of Finnmark. Rendulic claimed to have successfully evicted all but 200 Norwegians which he promised he would handle. In reality, between 20,000 and 25,000 civilians avoided relocation, including 10,000 residents of Kirkenes and the Varanger Peninsula who could not be moved due to logistical constraints and 8,500 Saami nomads who were exempt from the removal policy.

The Soviets attacked on 7 October. They captured Petsamo on 15 October, but due to supply problems, then had to halt the offensive for three days. Resuming on the 18th, they advanced down the Petsamo-Tarnet road, reaching the Norwegian border on the evening of 19 October. From here the Soviets would continue towards Kirkenes.

== Liberation ==
Soviet deaths during the Soviet force's campaign into Finnmark, was 611.

=== Recapture of Kirkenes ===
The fight for Kirkenes started on October 23, 1944, as the Soviet 14th Rifle Division beat off a series of counter-attacks from Tarnet to Kirkenes as they pursued the retreating Germans from Finland. That night, the 45th Rifle Division crossed the Jarfjord, leaving their tanks and rocket launchers with the 14th Rifle Division. Further south, the 10th Guards Division crossed over a pontoon bridge at Holmfoss, accompanied by KV tanks and self-propelled artillery.

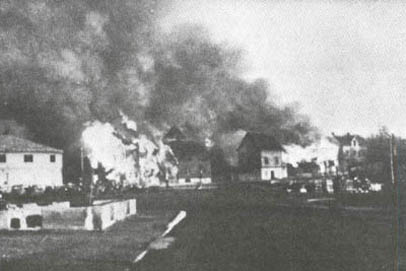
Kirkenes left burning by the Germans

On 24 October the 45th Rifle Division met little resistance as it advanced to the edge of Bøkfjord, just across from Kirkenes. The 14th Rifle Division had more trouble at Elvenes, where the Germans destroyed the local bridge to prevent them from crossing the fjord. Two companies were able to cross the fjord further south, where the gap was only 150–200 meters wide. The 10th Guards Division had advanced within 10 kilometers south of Kirkenes, securing the iron ore mines where many civilians were sheltering. The 28th Rifle Regiment was detached from the Guards division to cut off a potential German escape around the Langfjord, as the forces originally assigned with this task were low on supplies. Soviet air reconnaissance noticed German columns withdrawing from Kirkenes towards Neiden. Fires and explosions were seen in the town itself, as the withdrawing Germans had set the town ablaze as part of a scorched earth campaign. The 10th Guards Division reached the southern outskirts of the town by 03:00 25 October and engaged the withdrawing Germans.

The Soviet forces at Elvenes attempted once again to cross the Bøkfjord at around 05:00. The Germans withstood the assault for about an hour before being forced to retreat by direct attack and heavy artillery bombardment. Using amphibious Lend-Lease vehicles and makeshift rafts, the majority of the Soviet corps were able to cross the river by 09:00. From there they headed to the southeastern outskirts of Kirkenes.

Supported by tanks and artillery, the 10th, 65th, and 14th Rifle Divisions cleared out the last of the German rearguard from Kirkenes by midday 25 October.

=== Final Soviet operations ===
On 26 October the 10th Rifle Division captured a German airfield 15 kilometers west of Kirkenes. The 28th Rifle Regiment arrived at Highway 50 in Munkelv that morning, only to find German units were still retreating through the area. Fighting ensued, and the Soviets summarily blocked off the road, forcing the Germans to evacuate to the north where they were extracted by sea. By evening, the entirety of the Munkelv area was secured and the Soviets were pushing up the Neiden river.

The German rearguard had hastily prepared a defense in Neiden on a ridge line. With the help of local fishermen, the Soviets were able to cross the river on 27 October and capture the ridge. Fighting was fierce, and the Germans managed to burn every building in the village, save for the local church, before withdrawing.

Faced with rugged terrain and increasingly cold temperatures, the 14th Army forces in the area were ordered to halt their advance and assume a defensive posture. Only a reconnaissance force from the 114th Rifle Division continued west.

The last fighting in Norway, between Soviet forces and German forces, happened in Varangerbotn on 6 November.

The reconnaissance force went 116 kilometers northwest of Neiden before halting on 13 November at Rustefjelbma, Tana - on the west side of Tana Fjord.

=== Deployment of Norwegian forces ===
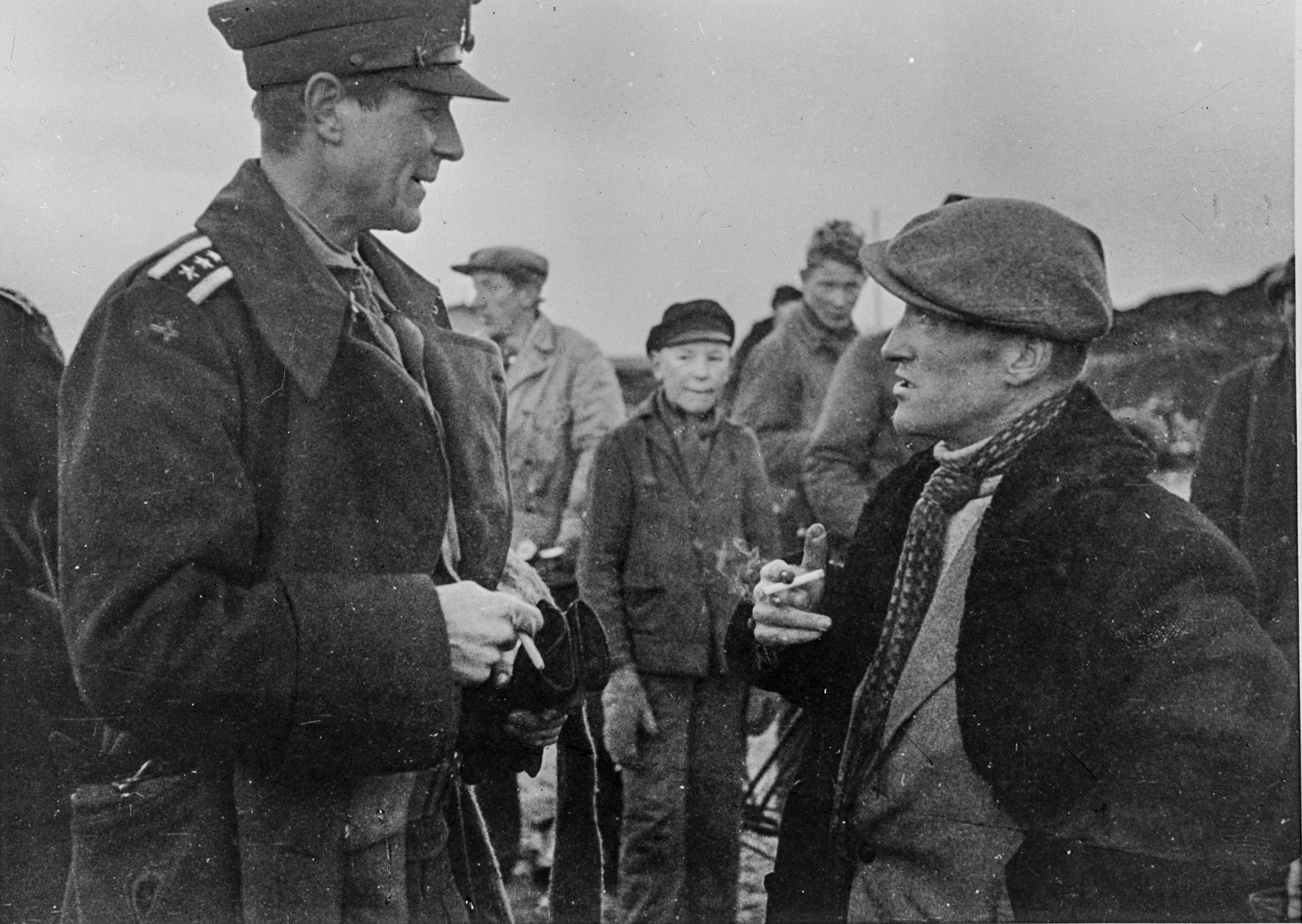
Colonel Arne Dagfin Dahl (left) in conversation with Peder Holt (right), the interim Governor of Finnmark, in Vadsø, in late 1944

On 25 October 1944, upon hearing that the Soviets were now entering Northern Norway, the British ordered the immediate deployment of Norwegian forces to the area to assist. The Norwegians assembled under Colonel Dahl, with a military mission (for liaison with the Soviets and to reestablish civil administration in Norway), the 231 strong "Bergkompani 2" (2nd Mountain Company) under Major S. Rongstad, an area naval command with 11 men, and an "Area Command Finnmark" with 12 men. Marked Force 138 by the British, the Norwegians embarked on HMS Berwick as part of Operation Crofter, arriving in Murmansk on 6 November. From there, they took a Soviet ship to Liinakhamari, boarding trucks that finally got them to Finnmark on 10 November. Colonel Dahl headquartered his mission in Bjørnevatn.

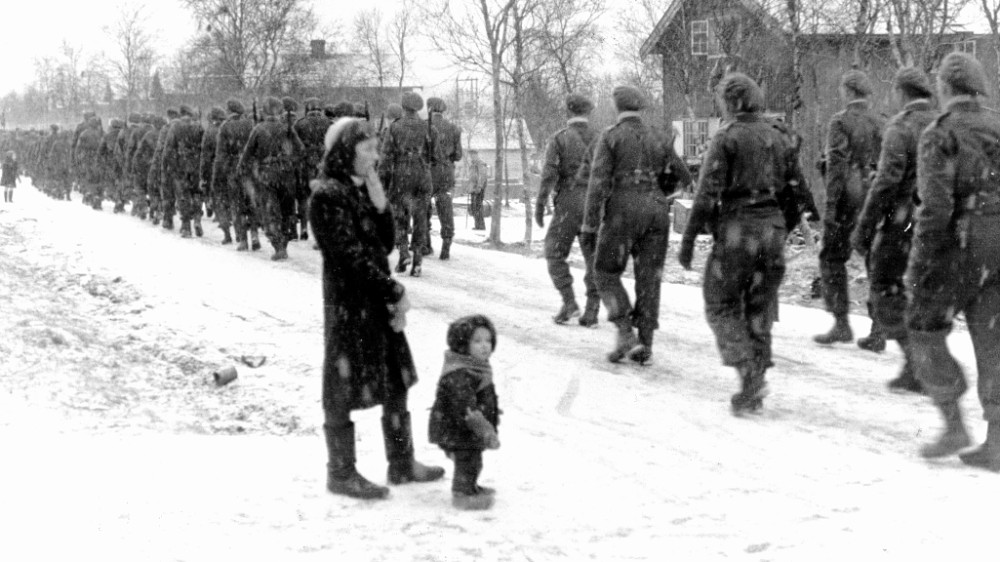
Free Norwegian Forces march through Bjørnevatn in November 1944.

The Soviet commander at the front, Lieutenant General Shcherbakov, wished for the Norwegians to be deployed to the front lines as soon as possible. Too small to cover the front themselves, the Norwegians enlisted local volunteers, putting them into hastily formed "guard companies" armed with Soviet weaponry, pending the arrival of reinforcements from the United Kingdom. Approximately 1,500 men from the Kirkenes area were recruited. On 29 November Norwegian corvettes Eglantine and Tønsberg Castle and three minesweepers were dispatched from Loch Ewe as part of Convoy JW 62 with 2,000 tons of supplies to assist the Norwegian forces in Finnmark. They reached Kola Inlet without incident on 7 December. On 14 December the Tønsberg Castle struck a mine and sank with heavy loss of life.

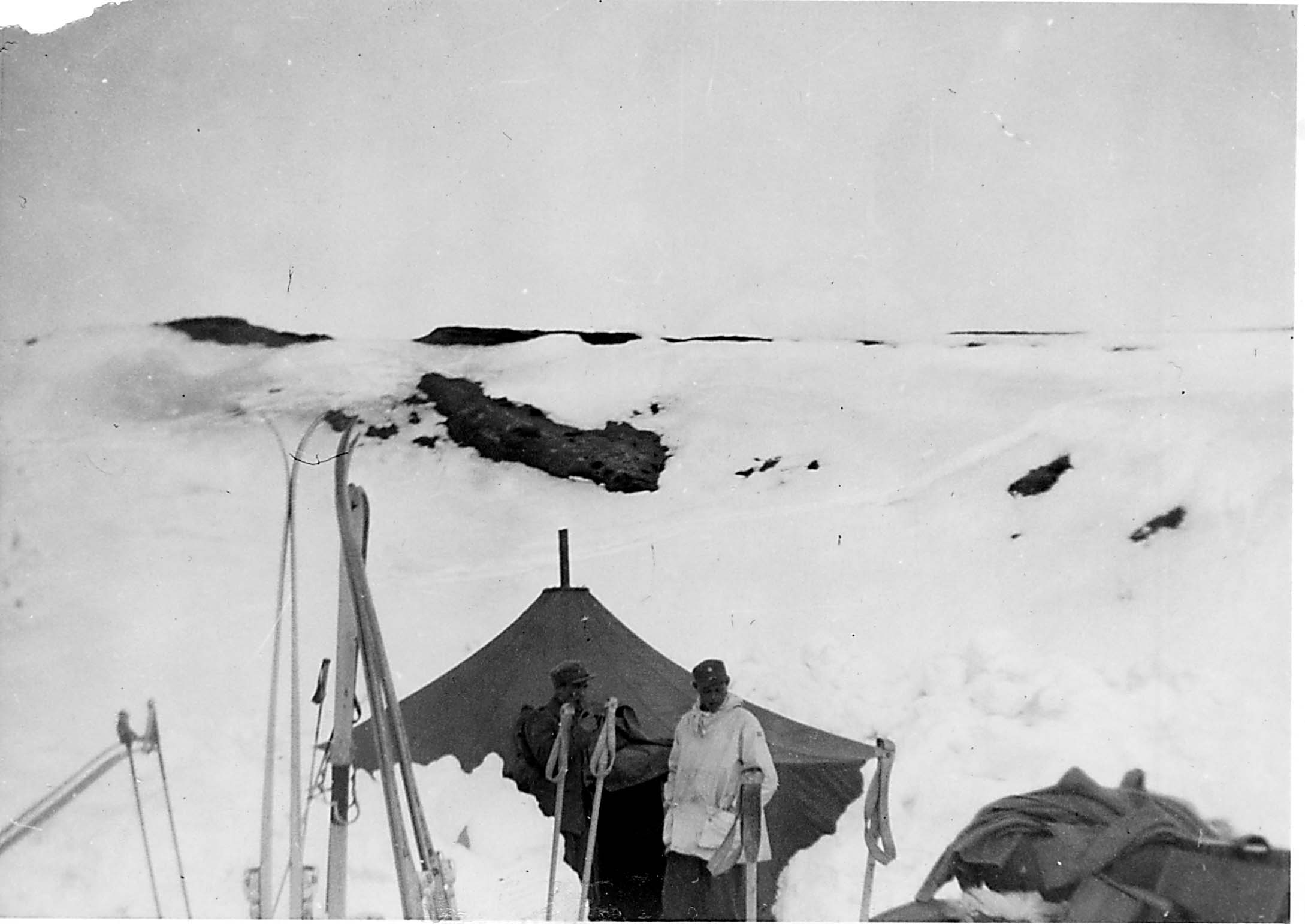
Norwegian police troops in Kautokeino Municipality.

Norwegian police troops - who for two years had been training secretly in Sweden – began arriving on 12 January 1945. Overall 1,442 men and 1,225 tons of material would be flown in from Kallax, Sweden to Finnmark. The United States sent nine C-47 Dakota transports to assist in moving the troops. By April 1945, there would be over 3,000 Norwegian soldiers in Northern Norway.

One of the first undertakings of the Norwegian force was reconnaissance at the front lines. This was to monitor German troop movements and to investigate the whereabouts of the local population. Reports from Porsanger Municipality showed that the Germans were in the process of withdrawing, but were busy laying mines and torching buildings. Few civilians were left.

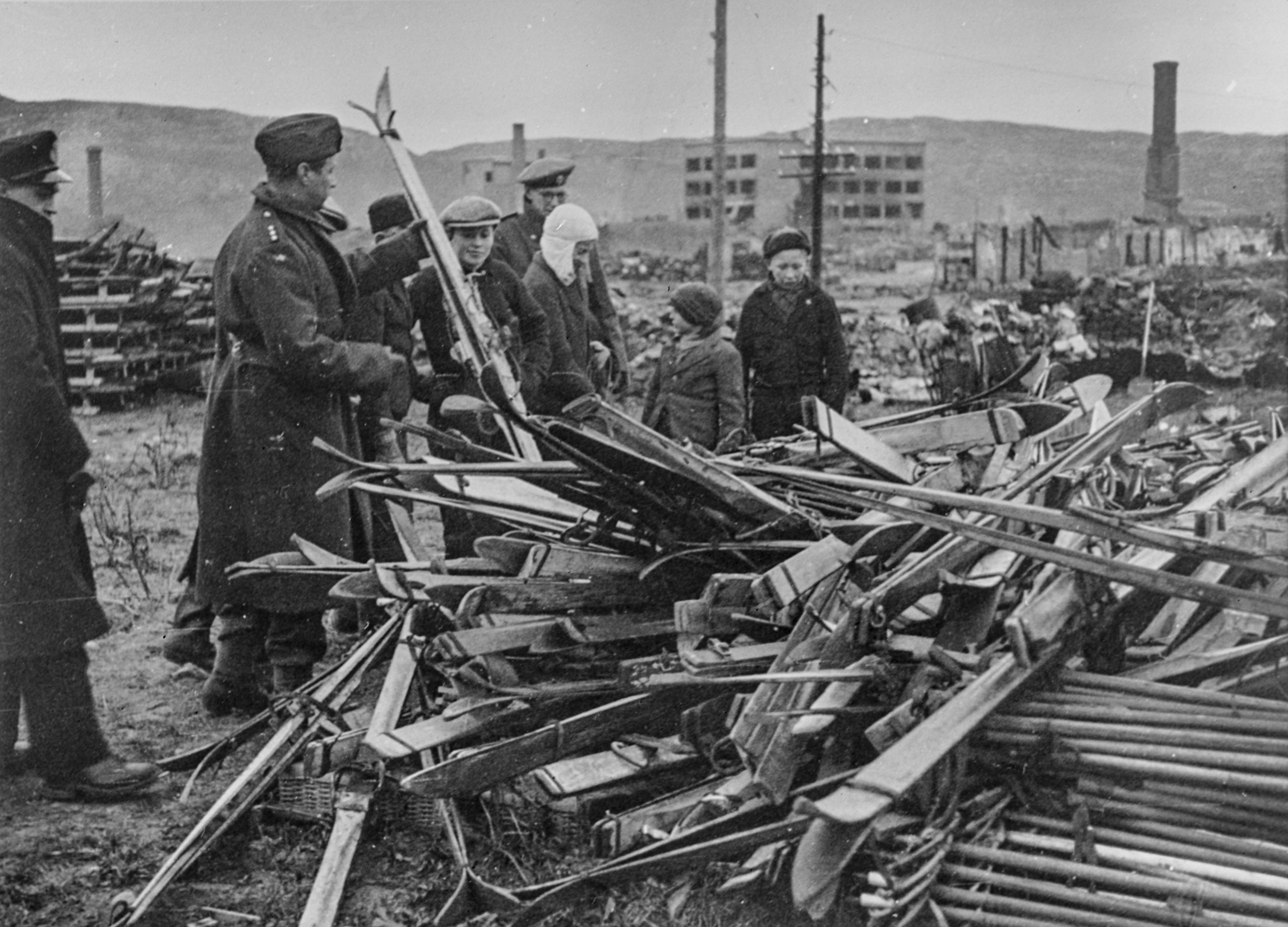
Norwegian officers examine skis left behind by retreating German troops in Finnmark

During this time some locals who had been hiding in the area began to return to their destroyed settlements. In Gamvik, about 300 civilians who had avoided evacuation built temporary shacks out of wreckage to shelter in. On 19 December 1944, German E-boats deployed landing parties to destroy the town a second time. Some townspeople managed to arm themselves and hold off the Germans long enough for the bulk of the population to escape. 17 people were captured and forced to evacuate.

The Norwegian troops sent rescue parties under Colonel Gunnar Johnson to assist civilians left stranded in scorched western Finnmark. By Christmas 1944, nearly 900 people had been successfully evacuated to liberated territory. In January 1945 he began making plans for a rescue operation on the island of Sørøya. On 15 February, in the only direct military action undertaken by the Western Allies (other than Norway) during the campaign, one Canadian and three British destroyers rescued 502 men, women, and children from the island. By 1945 a group of Norwegian militiamen began operating on the island, ambushing German patrols while trying to avoid destruction. Various skirmishes and raids between February and March result in the deaths of six militiamen, and the capture of 14 more. Six fishing vessels employed by the militia were destroyed in a German air attack. Several Germans were also killed on the island.

Elsewhere the Norwegians assisted the locals and dealt with the occasional German raid. Bergkompani 2 lost four men while retaking Finnmark. On 26 April 1945 the Norwegians declared Finnmark to be free. By the time of the German general surrender in Europe on May 8, the 1st Varanger battalion was poised on the Finnmark-Troms border.

== Aftermath ==
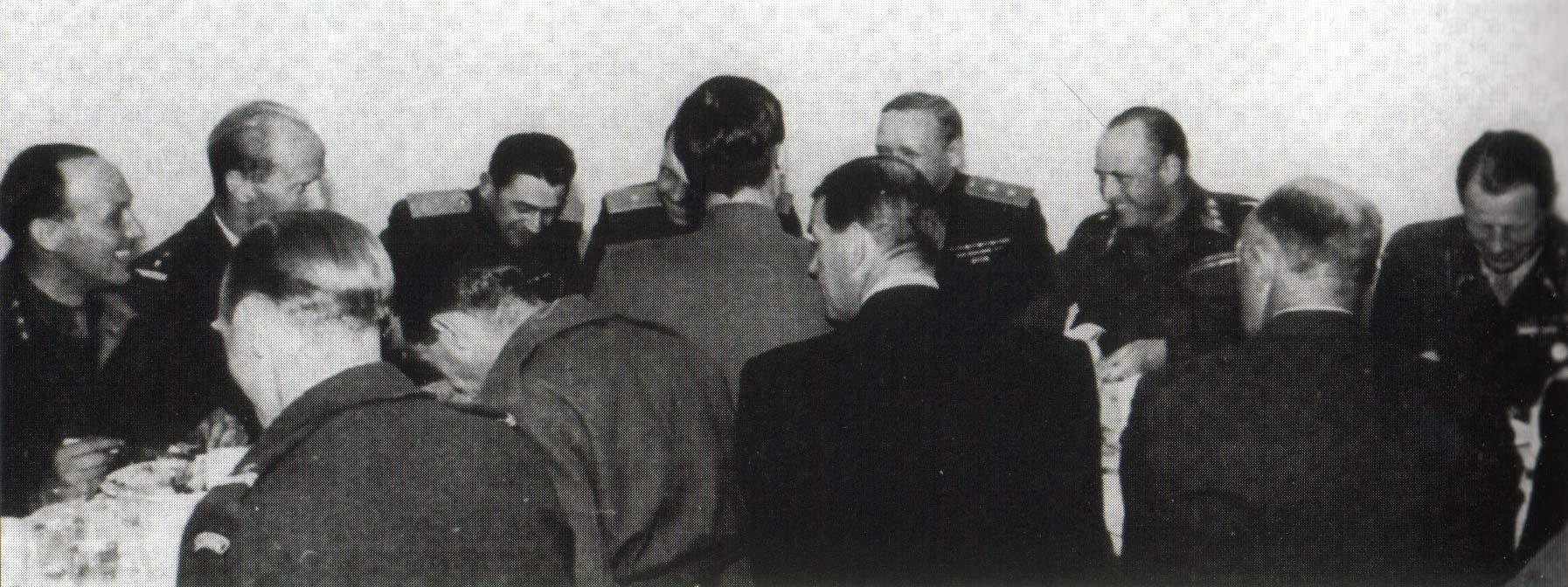
Dinner party in the Norwegian town of Kirkenes in July 1945. At the rear from right: Colonel Dahl, Prince Olav, and Commander of Soviet Forces in Norway Lieutenant General Shcherbakov.

The Germans in the remainder of occupied Norway capitulated on 8 May, bringing a definite end to the conflict.

Nearly 2,900 Soviet soldiers died in Norway during the conflict.

The civilian population was the group most affected by the campaign. The Germans, in pursuance of their scorched earth strategy, destroyed thousands of houses, barns, sheds, and businesses, along with much of Finnmark's infrastructure. Almost all of Kirkenes, Hammerfest, Hasvik, Vardø, Skarsvåg, Tufjord, Kamøyvær, Gjesvær, Nordvågen, and Neiden were burnt to the ground. About 2/3 of the houses in Vadsø were destroyed. Berlevåg, Mehamn, and Gamvik were entirely razed. Approximately 50,000 people fled or were forced to evacuate to the south by the Germans. It is estimated that over 300 civilians died due to exposure and other causes during this exodus. Another 25,000 who chose to stay sheltered in improvised huts, caves, and mines. A single tunnel near Bjørnevatn held 3,000 people. Parts of Troms were also evacuated and burned, in expectation of a continuation of the Allied offensive from the north. Even after hostilities had ceased, many civilians could not return to their towns until the Allies cleared away leftover German munitions. In July, the Norwegians hosted a dinner with the Soviets in Kirkenes to celebrate their victory. Among those in attendance were Norwegian Crown Prince Olav, Dahl, and Shcherbakov. The last Soviet forces withdrew from Norway on 25 September 1945.

== Legacy ==
The destruction of linguistic communities in Finnmark had a profound effect in the area after the war. As the reconstruction efforts in the region were mostly the responsibility of Norwegian-speaking officials, the prevalence of Sami languages in the coastal communities dramatically decreased in the postwar era.

There have been two modern celebrations of the Finnmark liberation in Kirkenes. On 25 October 2014 Norway celebrated the 70th anniversary and on 25 October 2019 the 75th anniversary was celebrated. Among those present for both ceremonies were King Harald, Norwegian Prime Minister Erna Solberg, and Russian Foreign Minister Sergey Lavrov.

== Sources ==
- Braunmüller, Kurt; Höder, Steffen; Kühl, Karoline, eds. (2014). Stability and Divergence in Language Contact: Factors and Mechanisms (repr. ed.). John Benjamins Publishing. ISBN 978-9-02-726955-3.
- Lunde, Hendrik (2011). Finland's War of Choice: The Troubled German−Finnish Coalition in World War II. Casemate. ISBN 978-1-61-200037-4.
- Mann, Chris (2012). British Policy and Strategy Towards Norway, 1941−45 (illus. ed.). Palgrave Macmillan. ISBN 978-0-23-021022-6.
