= Reidar Carlsen =

Norwegian politician (1908–1987)

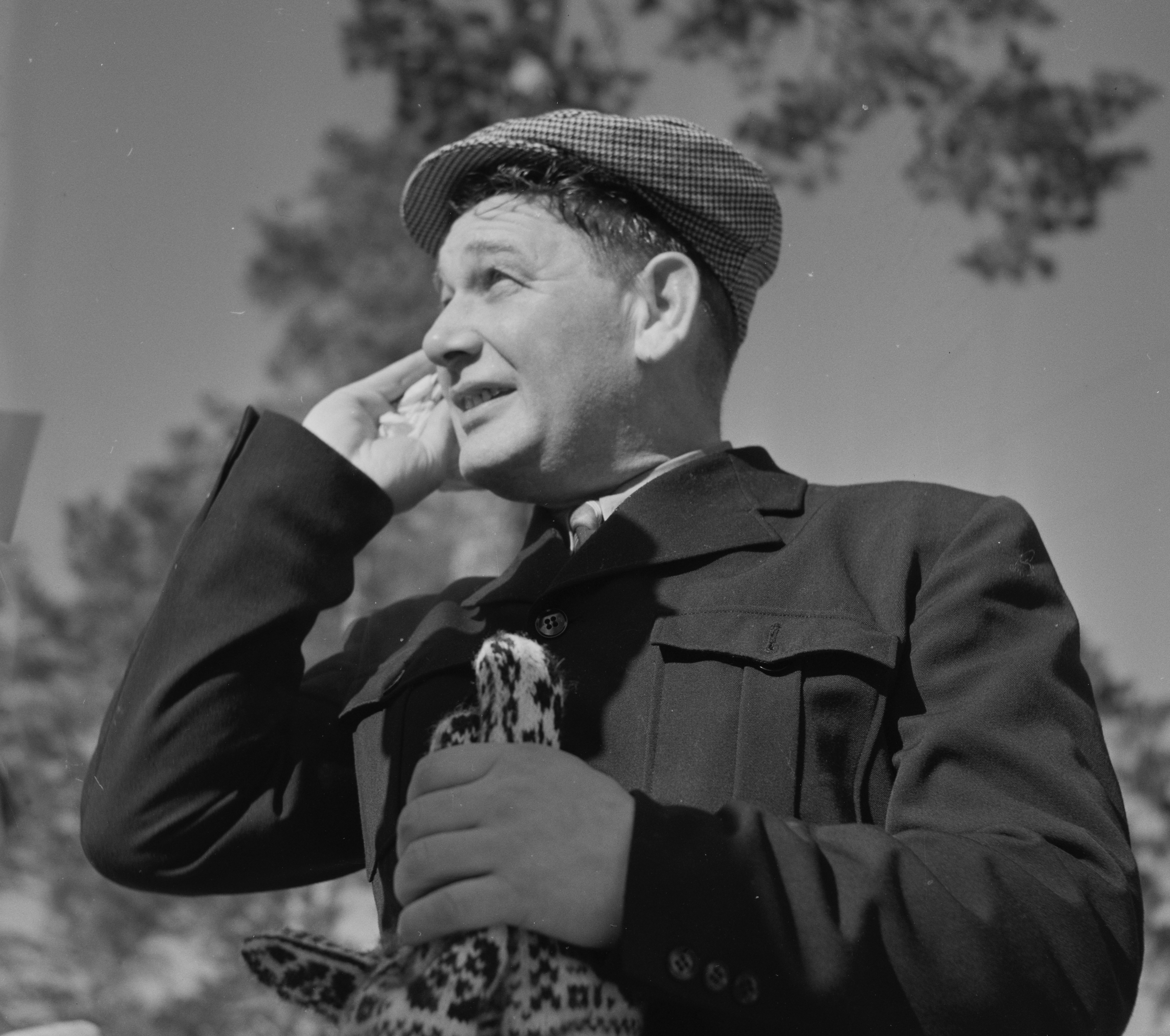

Chairman of Foreningen Norden in Norway
- In office 1969–1981
- Preceded by: Harald Throne-Holst
- Succeeded by: Helge Seip

Minister of Fisheries
- In office 1 July 1946 – 19 November 1951
- Prime Minister: Einar Gerhardsen
- Preceded by: Position established
- Succeeded by: Peder Holt

Member of the Norwegian Parliament
- In office 4 December 1945 – 30 September 1961
- Constituency: Nordland

Personal details
- Born: 1 July 1908 Bodin, Nordland, Norway
- Died: 2 May 1987 (aged 78) Oslo, Norway
- Party: Labour
- Spouse: Erna Alvide Jensen (m. 1932)

Reidar Carlsen (1 July 1908 – 2 May 1987) was a Norwegian politician for the Labour Party.

Reidar Carlsen was born in Bodin Municipality in Nordland county, Norway. He studied at the National School of Forestry (Skogskolen) in the town of Steinkjer (1928–1929).

He was Member of Parliament of Norway from 1945 to 1961. He was Minister of Trade 1945–1946, and Minister of Fisheries 1946–1951. He served as Director of the Regional Development Fund 1961–78.

== Awards ==
- Petter Dass Medal (Petter Dass -medaljen) - (1955)
- Order of St. Olav - (1968)
- King Haakon VII 100-year Medal - (1972)

Cultural offices
Preceded by Harald Throne-Holst	Chairman of Foreningen Norden in Norway; 1969–1981	Succeeded by Helge Seip
