= Second Bratteli cabinet =

Government of Norway from 1973 to 1976

Bratteli's Second Cabinet
- Cabinet of Norway

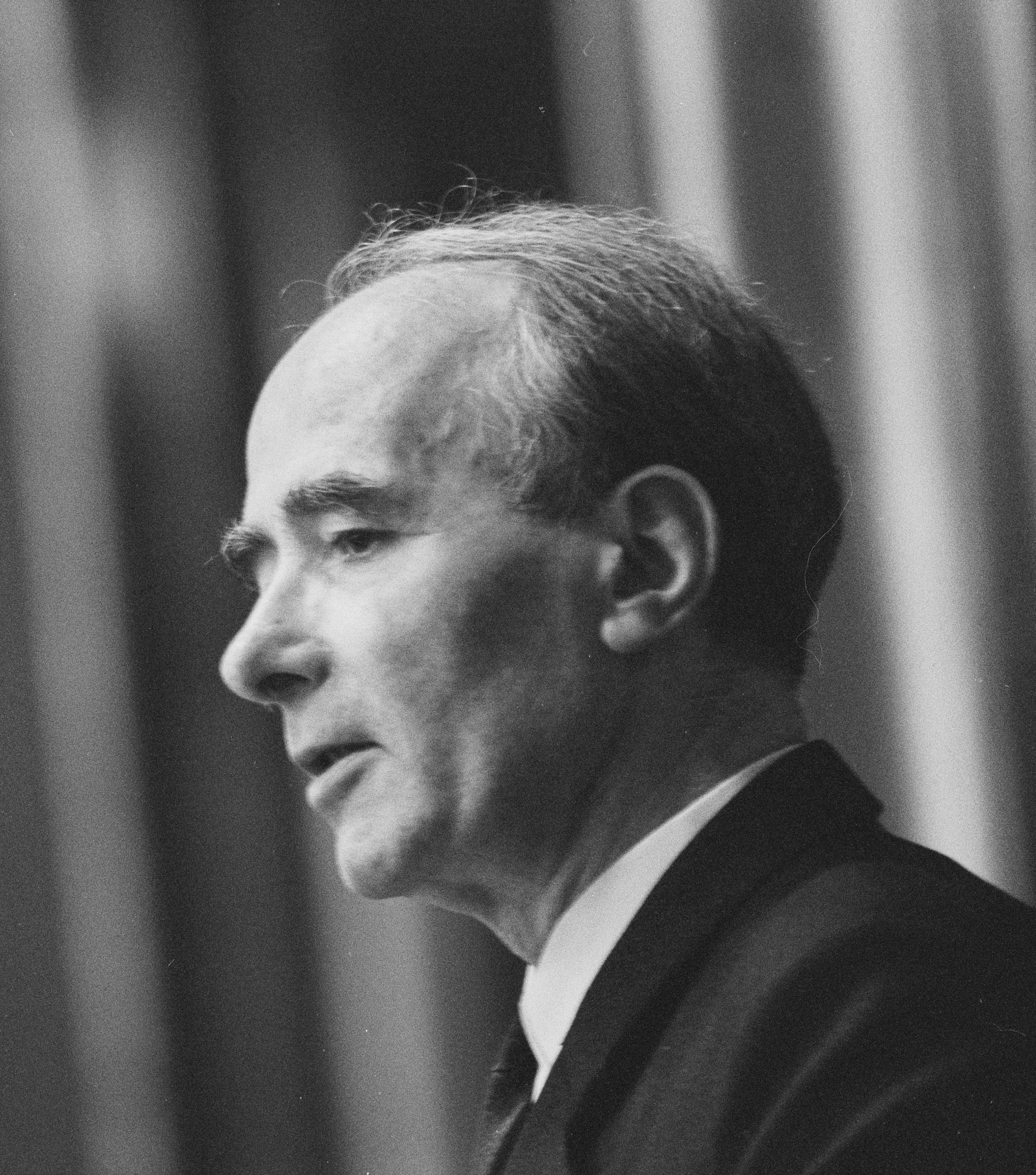
- Date formed: 16 October 1973
- Date dissolved: 15 January 1976

People and organisations
- King: Olav V of Norway
- Prime Minister: Trygve Bratteli
- Total no. of members: 15
- Member party: Labour Party
- Status in legislature: Minority government

History
- Election: 1973 parliamentary election
- Legislature term: 1973–1977
- Predecessor: Korvald's Cabinet
- Successor: Nordli's Cabinet

Bratteli's Second Cabinet governed Norway between 16 October 1973 and 15 January 1976. The Labour Party cabinet was led by Trygve Bratteli.

== Cabinet members ==
Cabinet
Portfolio	Minister	Took office	Left office	Party
Prime Minister	Trygve Bratteli	16 October 1973	15 January 1976	Labour
Minister of Foreign Affairs	Knut Frydenlund	16 October 1973	15 January 1976	Labour
Minister of Finance and Customs	Per Kleppe	16 October 1973	15 January 1976	Labour
Minister of Defence	Alv Fostervoll	16 October 1973	15 January 1976	Labour
Minister of Justice and the Police	Inger Louise Valle	16 October 1973	15 January 1976	Labour
Minister of Transport and Communications	Annemarie Lorentzen	16 October 1973	15 January 1976	Labour
Minister of Local Government and Labour	Leif Jørgen Aune	16 October 1973	15 January 1976	Labour
Minister of Education and Church Affairs; Minister of Nordic Cooperation	Bjartmar Gjerde	16 October 1973	15 January 1976	Labour
Minister of Social Affairs	Sonja Ludvigsen	16 October 1973	12 July 1974 (Note: Ludvigsen was on leave from 16 April until her death.)	Labour
Minister of Social Affairs	Tor Halvorsen	12 July 1974 (Note: Halvorsen was acting minister from 16 April before becoming permanent minister on 6 September.)	15 January 1976	Labour
Minister of Family Affairs and Government Administration	Odd Sagør	16 October 1973	15 January 1976	Labour
Minister of Agriculture	Thorstein Treholt	16 October 1973	15 January 1976	Labour
Minister of Industry	Ingvald Ulveseth	16 October 1973	15 January 1976	Labour
Minister of Trade and Shipping	Jens Evensen	16 October 1973	27 September 1974	Labour
Minister of Trade and Shipping	Einar Magnussen (acting)	27 September 1974	15 January 1976	Labour
Minister of the Environment	Tor Halvorsen	16 October 1973	6 September 1974	Labour
Minister of the Environment	Gro Harlem Brundtland	6 September 1974	15 January 1976	Labour
Minister of Fisheries	Eivind Bolle	16 October 1973	15 January 1976	Labour
Minister of Maritime Law (Note: The post of Maritime Law minister was one without a portfolio.)	Jens Evensen	27 September 1974	15 January 1976	Labour

== State Secretaries ==
Ministry	State Secretary	Period (Note: Unless otherwise noted, the period was 16 October 1973 – 15 January 1976)	Party
Office of the Prime Minister	Oluf Fuglerud		Labour
Office of the Prime Minister	Arne Gunnar Lie		Labour
Office of the Prime Minister	Kjell Thorbjørn Kristensen		Labour
Ministry of Foreign Affairs	Arne Arnesen	30 October 1973 – 2 November 1975	Labour
Ministry of Finance and Customs	Bjørn Skogstad Aamo	19 October 1973 –	Labour
Ministry of Defence	Thorvald Stoltenberg	22 October 1973 – 1 December 1974	Labour
Ministry of Defence	Lasse Aasland	1 December 1974 –	Labour
Ministry of Industry	Reidar Engell Olsen	22 October 1973 –	Labour
Ministry of Industry	Reidar Hirsti	1 May 1974 – 30 June 1975	Labour
Ministry of Local Government and Labour	Arnfinn Lund	22 October 1973 –	Labour
Ministry of Social Affairs	Kjell Knudsen	5 November 1973 –	Labour
Ministry of Transport and Communications	Olav Marås	29 October 1973 – 30 September 1974	Labour
Ministry of Transport and Communications	Sigmund Larsen	23 September 1974 – 10 August 1975	Labour
Ministry of Transport and Communications	Bjørn Flage Pettersen	11 August 1975 –	Labour
Ministry of Trade and Shipping	Einar Magnussen	12 November 1973 – 27 September 1974	Labour
Ministry of Trade and Shipping	Thorvald Stoltenberg	1 December 1974 –	Labour
Ministry of Fisheries	Birger Larsen	22 October 1973 –	Labour
Ministry of Agriculture	Ole Klemet Sara	12 November 1973 –	Labour
Ministry of the Environment	Olav Sigurd Carlsen	22 October 1973 – 15 June 1974	Labour
Ministry of the Environment	Jan Erik Gulbrandsen	1 June 1974 – 15 February 1975	Labour
Ministry of the Environment	Tore-Jarl Christensen	12 August 1975 –	Labour
Ministry of Justice and Police	Kai Ekanger	22 October 1973 –	Labour
Ministry of Consumer Affairs and Administration	Ulf Oscar Sand	22 October 1973 –	Labour
Ministry of Church Affairs and Education	Ingrid Eide	22 October 1973 –	Labour
Ministry of Church Affairs and Education	Bodil Skjånes Dugstad	1 November 1973 – 30 June 1975	Labour
Ministry of Church Affairs and Education	Lars Uno Thulin	15 July 1975 –	Labour
