= Norges Råfisklag =

Norwegian seafood sales organization

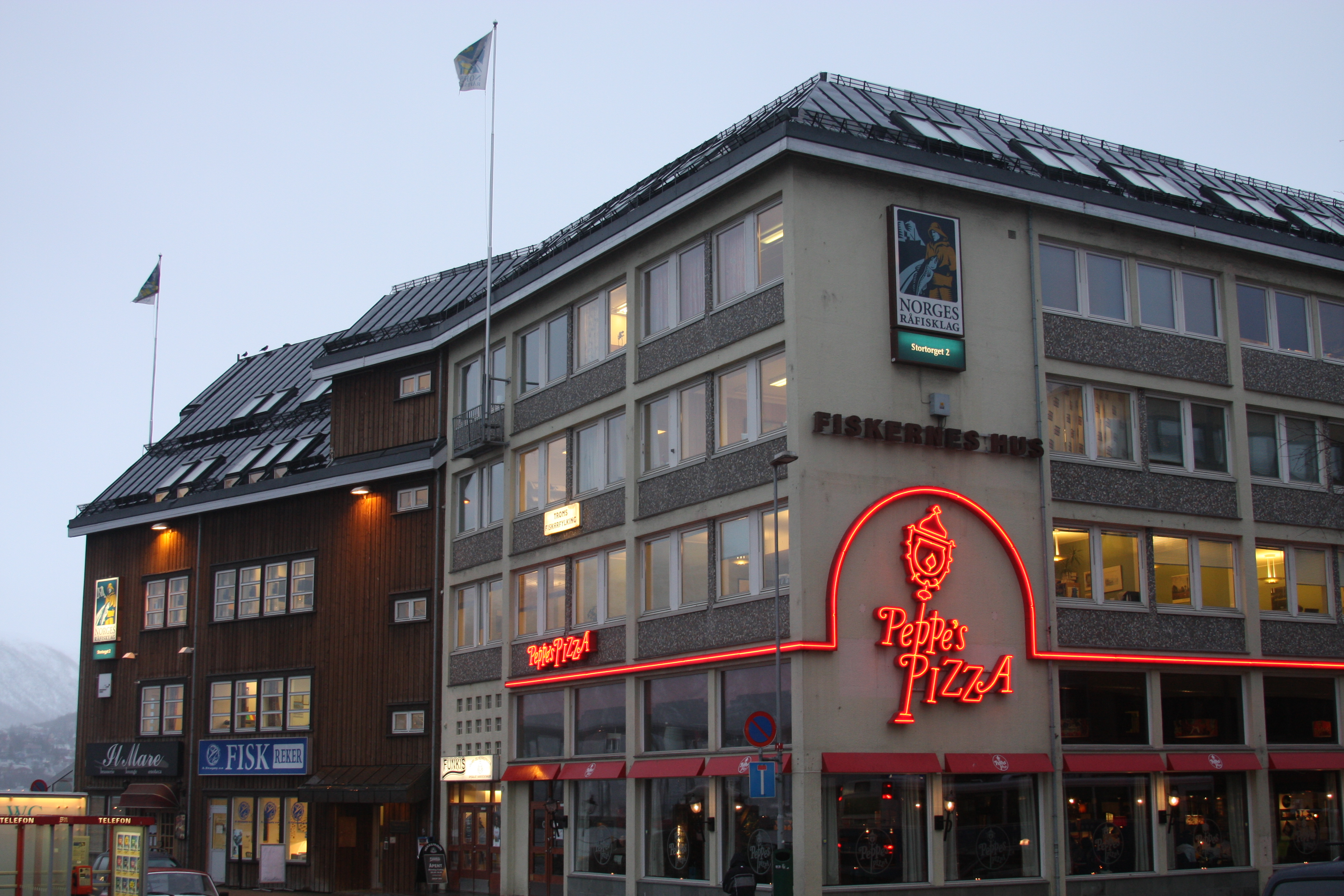
Norges Råfisklag in Tromsø, Norway

Norges Råfisklag is a Norwegian sales organization for cod fish, small whales and shellfish. It was established in 1938, and its headquarters is located in Tromsø.

Regulated by Norwegian fisheries law (råfiskloven), Norges Råfisklag has monopoly of all first-hand sale of codfish, small whales and shellfish delivered along the Norwegian coast between Nordmøre and Finnmark.

Annually approximately 1 million tons of fish and shellfish are sold through Norges Råfisklag, and total revenues in 2015 were about 9.7 billion NOK.
