= Cermaq =

Fish farming company

Cermaq Group AS
- Industry: Seafood, food processing
- Founded: 1995
- Headquarters: Oslo, Norway
- Key people: Yasuhiro Kawakami (Chair), Geir Molvik (CEO)
- Products: Farmed salmon, trout and coho; production of fish feed
- Revenue: NOK 8,529 billion (2016)
- Operating income: NOK 2,217 billion (2016)
- Net income: NOK 1,512 billion (2016)
- Total assets: NOK 15,421 billion (end 2016)
- Total equity: NOK 7,289 billion (end 2016)
- Owner: Mitsubishi Corporation (100%)
- Number of employees: 3,712 (end 2016)
- Website: www.cermaq.com

Cermaq is a company which farms salmon and trout in Norway, Canada, Chile and Scotland. In 2017 the farming business had sales of around USD 1,1 billion, and a total sales volume of 157,800 tonnes. Cermaq is a fully owned subsidiary of Mitsubishi Corporation. The company has its headquarters in Oslo, Norway.

== Operations ==
Cermaq produces Atlantic salmon, coho and trout. In Canada the operations are on Vancouver Island with offices located in Campbell River and Tofino. In Norway the company has operations in Nordland and Finnmark while the sea operations in Chile are in Region X, XI and XII, headed out of Puerto Montt. The total production of salmon was 157,800 tonnes in 2017. Cermaq has is committed to contributing to the UN's Sustainable Development Goals. Cermaq aims to certify all its farming sites to the Aquaculture Stewardship Council salmon standard for responsibly farmed salmon.

== History ==
Cermaq was founded as Statkorn Holding when the commercial division of Statens Kornforretning (now Statens Landbruksforvaltning) was demerged and made a limited company in 1995. The company operated grain wholesaling. In 1996 the company started to purchase NorAqua, a fish food producer, and in 1998 Cermaq started purchasing fish farms. In 2000, the government sold the first 20% of the company. Through the 2000s, Cermaq has sold its original grain wholesaling divisions and entered the seafood and fish food market. It was listed on Oslo Stock Exchange in 2006. Cermaq's feed business unit EWOS was sold in 2013. In October 2014 Mitsubishi Corporation acquired the company for $1.4 billion, taking 91 per cent of the shares in its offer.
