= Aas (surname) =

Surname

Aas or Ås is a surname. Notable people and fictional characters with the name include:

== People ==
- Agnar Aas (born 1951), Norwegian civil servant
- Alexander Aas (born 1978), Norwegian footballer
- Alf-Jørgen Aas (1915–1981), Norwegian painter and art instructor
- Anne Lise Aas (1925–2020), Norwegian interior designer
- Arne Aas (actor) (1931–2000), Norwegian actor
- Arne Aas (politician) (1890–1953), Norwegian civil servant and politician
- Arto Aas (born 1980), Estonian politician
- Bjarne Aas (1886–1969), Norwegian ship builder
- Einar Jan Aas (born 1955), Norwegian footballer
- Gunder Aas (1785–1853), Norwegian politician
- Hans Aas (1880–1960), Norwegian politician and unionist
- I. H. Monrad Aas (born 1948), Norwegian researcher
- Jan Aas (1944-2016), Norwegian footballer
- Jan Petter Aas, Norwegian handball player
- Jo Sondre Aas (born 1989), Norwegian footballer
- Johan Aas (born 1960), Norwegian politician
- Jonas Aas (1890–1971), Norwegian footballer
- Kari Aas (1886–1978), Norwegian teacher and Scout leader
- Karl Aas (1899–1943), Norwegian gymnast
- Kätlin Aas (born 1992), Estonian fashion model
- Kim Aas (born 1970), Danish politician
- Kristine Aas (1793–1863), Norwegian writer and painter
- Lars Aas (1879–1964), Norwegian fencer
- Nils Aas (1933–2004), Norwegian sculptor
- Olof Ås (1892–1948), Swedish theater and film actor
- Per Almar Aas (1929–2014), Norwegian politician
- Raimo Aas (born 1953), Estonian humorist
- Rene Aas (born 1969), Estonian motorcycle racer
- Roald Aas (1928–2012), Norwegian speed skater and cyclist
- Rolf Aas (1891-1946), Norwegian footballer
- Sigrid Aas (born 1980), Norwegian cross-country skier
- Syver Aas (born 2004), Norwegian football player
- Taavi Aas (born 1966), Estonian politician
- Th. Valentin Aass (1887–1961), Norwegian sailor and civil servant
- Ulf Aas (1919–2011), Norwegian illustrator

== Fictional characters ==
- Peder Ås, a fictional character and placeholder name used in Norwegian legal writings

== See also ==
- Aas (disambiguation)
- Ås (disambiguation)
