= Arne Aas =

Arne Aas may refer to:

- Arne Aas (politician) (1890–1953), Norwegian lawyer, judge, governor and conservative (H) politician
- Arne Aas (actor) (1931–2000), Norwegian actor
- Arne Aas (judge) (1891–1972), Norwegian lawyer, judge and liberal (V) politician (no)
