= Ås =

Ås is the Scandinavian language word for an esker, a ridge of sand and gravel.

Ås may also refer to:

== People ==
- Ås (surname)

== Places ==
=== Finland ===
- Ås, the Swedish name for the Harju quarter in Helsinki

=== Norway ===
- Ås, Akershus, a municipality in Akershus county
- Ås, Agder, a village in Birkenes municipality in Agder county
- Ås Station, a railway station on the Østfold Line in Ås, Akershus county
- Ås, Trøndelag, a village in Tydal municipality in Trøndelag county

=== Sweden ===
- Ås, Nora, a locality situated in Nora Municipality, Örebro County
- Ås Abbey, a former Cistercian monastery situated near the mouth of the River Viskan in Halland
- Ås, Krokom Municipality, a locality in Krokom Municipality, Jämtland County

== Other ==
- Ås IF, a Swedish football club located in Ås near Östersund
- Ås Avis, a weekly newspaper in the municipality of Ås, Norway
- Ås, the singular noun for the fabled Norwegian Æsir

== See also ==
- Aas (disambiguation)
