= Hovdenak =

Hovdenak is a Norwegian surname. Notable people with the surname include:

- Hilde Hovdenak (born 1971), Norwegian long-distance runner
- Nils Olaf Hovdenak (1854–1942), Norwegian politician
- Olaf Hovdenak (1891–1929), Norwegian long-distance runner
- Odd Hovdenak (1917–1982), Norwegian civil servant
