= Hans Skotner =

Norwegian Lawyer

Hans Ougen Skotner

Acting Governor of Troms
- In office 1941–1946
- Preceded by: Hans Gabrielsen
- Succeeded by: Arne Aas

Personal details
- Born: 1903 Norway
- Died: 1987 (aged 83–84) Norway
- Citizenship: Norway
- Profession: Politician

Hans Ougen Skotner (1903–1987) was a Norwegian lawyer and government official. He served briefly as the County Governor of Troms county from 1941 until 1945. The previous governor, Gunnar Bjørn Nordbye died suddenly in 1940. The Kingdom of Norway was in the midst of fighting against the German occupation of Norway, so the government-in-exile of Norway appointed Hans Gabrielsen, the County Governor of Finnmark county (to the north), as the acting governor of Troms county also. He was soon arrested by the German authorities, so then Hans Skotner was appointed to be the acting governor of Troms to replace Gabrielsen. The German-supported Nasjonal Samling government appointed Marcus Bull to be the County Governor of Troms in 1941. Skotner resumed his duties as acting governor after the war ended until Arne Aas was named the next official governor in 1946.

Government offices
Preceded by Hans Gabrielsen (acting)	Acting County Governor of Troms; 1940–1941, 1945–1946; Marcus Bull was named County Governor of Troms by the German-occupied government during the war (1941–1945)	Succeeded by Arne Aas
