= Gunder Gundersen Hammer =

Norwegian politician and government official

Governor of Stavangers amt
- In office 1768–1772
- Preceded by: Henrik Lachmann
- Succeeded by: Vilhelm Mathias Skeel

Governor of Finnmarkens amt
- In office 1757–1768
- Preceded by: Mathias Collett
- Succeeded by: Eiler Hagerup

Personal details
- Born: 22 September 1725 Trondhjem, Norway
- Died: 18 October 1772 (aged 47) Stavanger, Norway
- Citizenship: Denmark-Norway
- Profession: Politician

Gunder Gundersen Hammer (1725–1772) was a Norwegian politician and government official. He served as the County Governor of Finnmark county from 1757 until 1768 and then he was transferred to be the County Governor for Stavanger county from 1768 until his death in 1772.

Government offices
Preceded by Mathias Collett	County Governor of Finnmarkens amt 1757–1768	Succeeded by Eiler Hagerup
Preceded by Henrik Lachmann	County Governor of Stavanger amt 1768–1772	Succeeded by Vilhelm Mathias Skeel
