= AAS =

Aas or AAS may refer to:

== Arts and media ==
- A.a.s (art group), a British-based art collective
- Aas (TV series), a Pakistani television series
- Abandon All Ships, a band from Toronto, Ontario
- Austin American-Statesman, a Texas newspaper
- Australian Aboriginal Studies, an Australian academic journal

== Businesses and organizations ==
=== Academic and professional associations ===
- African Academy of Sciences, an Africa-wide scientific organization
- American Antiquarian Society, an American society and national research library
- American Arachnological Society, a society of amateur and professional arachnologists
- American Association of Suicidology, an American nonprofit suicide prevention organization
- American Astronautical Society, an independent scientific and technical group in the US
- American Astronomical Society, a US society of professional astronomers
- Association for Academic Surgery
- Association for Asian Studies, a scholarly professional association focusing on Asia and the study of Asia
- Assyrian Academic Society
- Australian Academy of Science, an independent, government-endorsed society with the aim of promoting science
- Australian Anthropological Society

=== Other organizations ===
- Air Ambulance Service, a UK charity
- Alcatel Alenia Space, an aerospace company; now Thales Alenia Space
- All-America Selections, an organization that promotes development of new garden seed varieties
- American Anti-Slavery Society
- Anglo-American School of Moscow
- Anglo-American School of Sofia
- Anglo American Sur, a copper mining company based in Chile
- Ansar al-Sunna, or Jamaat Ansar al-Sunna, a militant group operating in Iraq
- Arnold Air Society, a professional honorary service organization for US Air Force officer candidates
- Assyrian Aid Society, an Iraqi organization of the Assyrian Democratic Movement
- Ateliers Aéronautiques de Suresnes, a defunct French aircraft manufacturing company
- Austrian Air Services, a defunct airline from Austria (ICAO designator)

== Places ==
- Aas, Pyrénées-Atlantiques, a village in France
- Apalapsili Airport in Highland Papua Province, Indonesia (IATA airport code AAS)
- Taylor County Airport (Kentucky), Campbellsville, US, FAA LID

== Science, mathematics, and technology ==
=== Medicine ===
- Acute aortic syndrome
- Anabolic–androgenic steroids, or simply anabolic steroids

=== Other uses in science, mathematics, and technology ===
- Asymptotically almost surely
- Angle-Angle-Side; see congruence (geometry)
- Armed Aerial Scout, a U.S. Army replacement program for the OH-58 Kiowa
- Atomic absorption spectroscopy, for quantitative determination of chemical elements
- ASCII Adjust after Subtraction, one of the x86 Intel BCD opcodes
- Sony Auto-lock Accessory Shoe, on cameras

== Other uses ==
- Aas (surname), people with the surname Aas
- Acta Apostolicae Sedis, the commentary of the Vatican
- As a service, a business model
- Asa language, an extinct language of Tanzania, ISO 639-3 code
- Associate of Applied Science, a college degree
- Audit and Assurance Standards issued by ICAI, the Institute of Chartered Accountants of India
- Eyeish, a Native American tribe
