= Heløe =

Heløe is a surname. Notable people with the surname include:

- Leif Arne Heløe (born 1932), Norwegian politician
- Liv Heløe, Norwegian actress and writer
