= Nordbye =

Nordbye is a surname. Notable people with the surname include:

- Gunnar Nordbye (1888–1977), American judge
- Gunnar Bjørn Nordbye (1897–1940), Norwegian lawyer and politician
