= Andreas Tostrup Urbye =

Norwegian civil servant, lawyer and politician

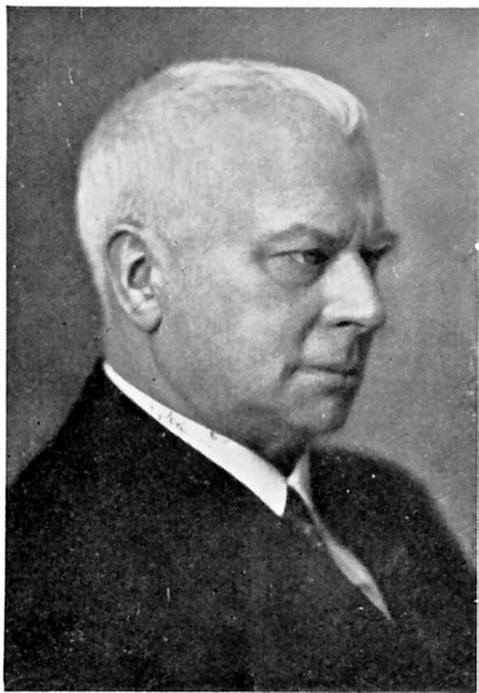

County Governor of Finnmark
- In office 1906–1912
- Preceded by: Truls J. W. Graff
- Succeeded by: Johan A. Rivertz

Minister of Labour
- In office 31 January 1913 – 26 July 1916
- Prime Minister: Gunnar Knudsen
- Preceded by: Nils Olaf Hovdenak
- Succeeded by: Martin Olsen Nalum

Minister of Justice
- In office 26 July 1916 – 1 May 1917
- Prime Minister: Gunnar Knudsen
- Preceded by: Lars Abrahamsen
- Succeeded by: Otto Blehr

Personal details
- Born: 8 May 1869 Fredrikshald, Østfold, Sweden-Norway
- Died: 16 May 1955 (aged 86) Norway
- Spouse: Anna Robertson
- Profession: Politician; Lawyer

Andreas Tostrup Urbye (8 May 1869–16 May 1955) was a Norwegian civil servant, lawyer, and politician. He served as a county governor and also as a Minister in the Norwegian Cabinet from 1913-1917. He was also the secretary at the Karlstad negotiations that led to the dissolution of the union between Norway and Sweden.

== Personal life and education ==
Andreas Tostrup Urbye was born on 8 May 1869 in Fredrikshald, Norway. His parents were Gabriel Joachim Urbye and Elisabeth Sofie Eeg. He graduated from school in 1891 with a cand.jur. degree. Later, he studied abroad during the 1890s. In 1901, he married Anna Robertson who was from Hammerfest. He received his Dr.juris degree in criminal law in 1909. He died on 16 May 1955.

== Career ==
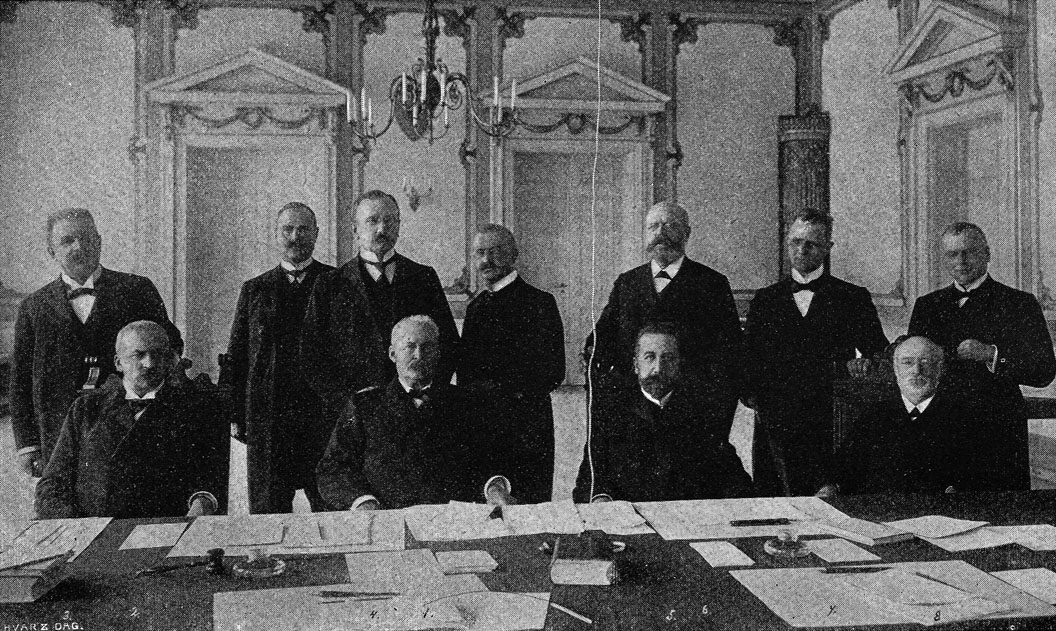
Urbye on the far right at the Karlstad negotiations to dissolve the Union of Norway and Sweden.

In 1898, he was hired as the state attorney in Troms and Finnmark. In 1904, he was hired as a law professor at the University of Kristiania. In 1905, he was the secretary of the Norwegian delegates to the Karlstad negotiations that led to the dissolution of the union between Norway and Sweden.

In 1906, Urbye was appointed as the County Governor of Finnmark county . He resigned in 1912. He was a judge in Eiker, Modum, and Sigdal in 1912 and 1913. In 1913, he was appointed as the Minister of Labour. On 26 July 1916, the Prime Minister of Norway, Gunnar Knudsen, shuffled his Cabinet and moved Urbye to the post of Minister of Justice, a job he held for one year. He proposed a bill to restrict the freedom of the press in 1917, but it was voted down in the Odelsting, so he resigned his position and left the government. Shortly thereafter, was briefly the Stiftamtsmann of Oslo in 1917.

In 1918, he began working in the field of diplomacy. From 1918-1922, he was the government's envoy to Helsinki. From 1922-1924, he was the envoy to Tallinn and Riga. From 1924-1939, he was the government's envoy to Moscow. From 1939 until 1949, he was a member of the Permanent Court of Arbitration in The Hague.

Government offices
| Preceded by Truls Johannessen Wiel Graff | County Governor of Finnmarkens amt 1906–1912 | Succeeded by Johan Albrigt Rivertz |
| Preceded by Nils Olaf Hovdenak | Minister of Labour; 1913–1916 | Succeeded by Martin Olsen Nalum |
| Preceded by Lars Kristian Abrahamsen | Minister of Justice and the Police; 1916–1917 | Succeeded by Otto Albert Blehr |
