= Fløtten =

Fløtten is a surname. Notable people with the surname include:

- Audun Fløtten (born 1990), Norwegian road cyclist
- Erling Fløtten (1937–2010), Norwegian politician
- Ingrid Røstad Fløtten (born 1954), Norwegian judge and politician
