= Johan Albrigt Rivertz =

Governor of Finnmark
- In office 1912–1921
- Preceded by: Andreas Tostrup Urbye
- Succeeded by: Hagbarth Lund

Justice of the Supreme Court of Norway
- In office 1922–19??

Personal details
- Born: 14 August 1874 Korgen, Norway
- Died: 14 January 1942 (aged 67) Oslo, Norway
- Citizenship: Norway
- Profession: Politician, judge

Johan Albrigt Rivertz (14 August 1874 – 14 January 1942) was a county governor of Finnmark county and later a judge on the Supreme Court of Norway.

== Personal life ==
Johan Albrigt Rivertz was born in Korgen in Nordland county, Norway. He was born to the teacher and farmer Ivar Rivertz and his wife Jonella Pernille Jakobsen. Rivertz married Maria Midelfart in 1899.

Rivertz died on 14 January 1942 in Oslo.

== Education and career ==
Rivertz graduated with a cand.jur. degree in 1896 and was appointed to a post at the Norwegian Ministry of Justice in 1899. He later served as County Governor of Finnmark from 1912 to 1921. He was named as a Supreme Court Justice in 1922.

Government offices
| Preceded by Andreas Tostrup Urbye | County Governor of Finnmark; 1912–1921 | Succeeded by Hagbarth Lund |
