= Carl Frederik Motzfeldt =

Norwegian politician

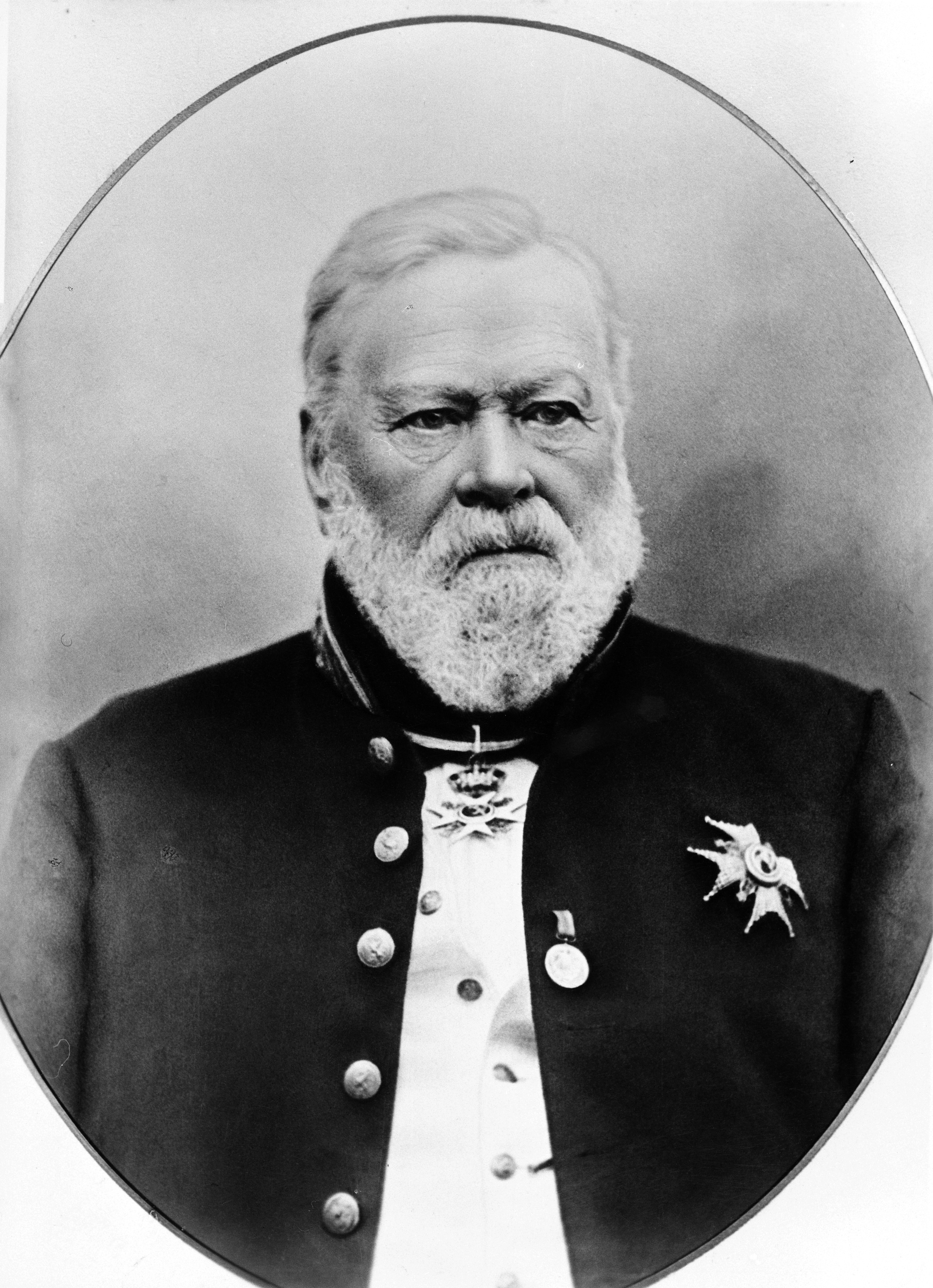

Governor of Søndre Trondhjems amt
- In office 1857–1894
- Preceded by: Karelius August Arntzen
- Succeeded by: Lars Otto Roll Grundt

Governor of Finnmarkens amt
- In office 1854–1857
- Preceded by: Anton Theodor Harris
- Succeeded by: Mathias B. K. Nannestad

Governor of Tromsø amt
- In office 1854–1857
- Preceded by: Anton Theodor Harris
- Succeeded by: Mathias B. K. Nannestad

Personal details
- Born: 3 April 1808 Rygge, Norway
- Died: 24 June 1902 (aged 94) Trondhjem, Norway
- Citizenship: Norway
- Profession: Politician

Carl Frederik Motzfeldt (3 April 1808 – 24 June 1902) was a Norwegian politician.

The son of General Major Carl M. Motzfeldt, he enrolled as a student in 1827 and graduated as cand.jur. in 1838. He was editor-in-chief of Den Constitutionelle from 1841 to 1842. He mostly worked in the Ministry of Auditing until 1854, when he was appointed Diocesan Governor of Tromsø stiftamt, which also included the jobs of County Governor of both Finmarkens Amt and Tromsø Amt (two of the subordinate counties under Tromsø).

In 1857 he was elected to the Norwegian Parliament in 1848, representing the urban constituency of Tromsø, Hammerfest og Vadsø, as the Governor was seated in Tromsø. However, he left Northern Norway the same year to become the Diocesan Governor of Trondhjems stiftamt and the County Governor of Søndre Trondhjems Amt. Seated in Trondhjem, he was elected to the Norwegian Parliament from the constituency of Trondhjem og Levanger in 1868, 1871, and 1874.

He was issued the Grand Cross of the Order of St. Olav. He retired in 1894, and died in 1902, cause of death is unknown.

Government offices
Preceded by Anton Theodor Harris	Diocesan Governor of Tromsø stiftamt 1854–1857	Succeeded by Mathias B. K. Nannestad
Preceded by Anton Theodor Harris	County Governor of Finnmarkens amt 1854–1857	Succeeded by Mathias B. K. Nannestad
Preceded by Anton Theodor Harris	County Governor of Tromsø amt 1854–1857	Succeeded by Mathias B. K. Nannestad
Preceded by Karelius August Arntzen	Diocesan Governor of Trondhjems stiftamt 1857–1894	Succeeded by Lars Otto Roll Grundt
Preceded by Karelius August Arntzen	County Governor of Søndre Trondhjems amt 1857–1894	Succeeded by Lars Otto Roll Grundt
