= Bernhard Getz =

Norwegian judge, professor, law reformer and Mayor of Oslo

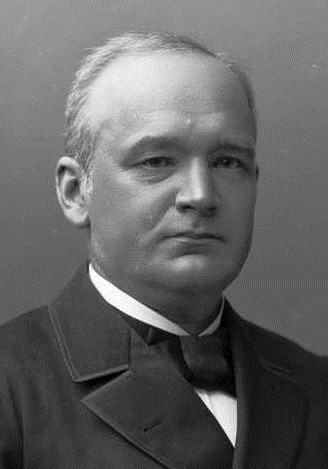
Bernhard Getz in 1896

Bernhard Getz (21 March 1850 – 1 November 1901) was a Norwegian judge, professor, law reformer and Mayor of Oslo.

He was born at Strinda in Sør-Trøndelag, Norway. He was the son of merchant Anton Lauritz Getz (1817–68) and Anna Christence Jenssen (1825–94). He graduated artium at Trondheim Cathedral School in 1868. He traveled abroad with public scholarships in 1875, stayed for the most part in Leipzig to study criminal law and legal proceedings. In 1876, Getz was appointed professor of law at the University of Kristiania. He took his law degree in 1889 at the University of Copenhagen.

From 1889 to 1901 he served as the first Norwegian Director of Public Prosecutions. From 1891 he led the National Civil Procedure Law Commission. He was a member of the city council of Kristiania (now Oslo) and mayor from 1891 to 1892. He was a member of the Norwegian Nobel Committee from 1897.

== Personal life ==
He was married to Johanne Christine Fredrikke Berg (1855–1924) with whom he had seven children, including Supreme Court Attorney Eyvind Getz (1888–1956). He died in 1901 at 51 years of age and was buried at Vestre Aker in Oslo.

Legal offices
Preceded by position created	Norwegian Director of Public Prosecutions; 1889–1901	Succeeded by Johan Blackstad
Political offices
Preceded by Karl Lous	Mayor of Oslo; 1891	Succeeded by August Bonnevie
