= Regina Alexandrova =

Norwegian politician (born 1967)

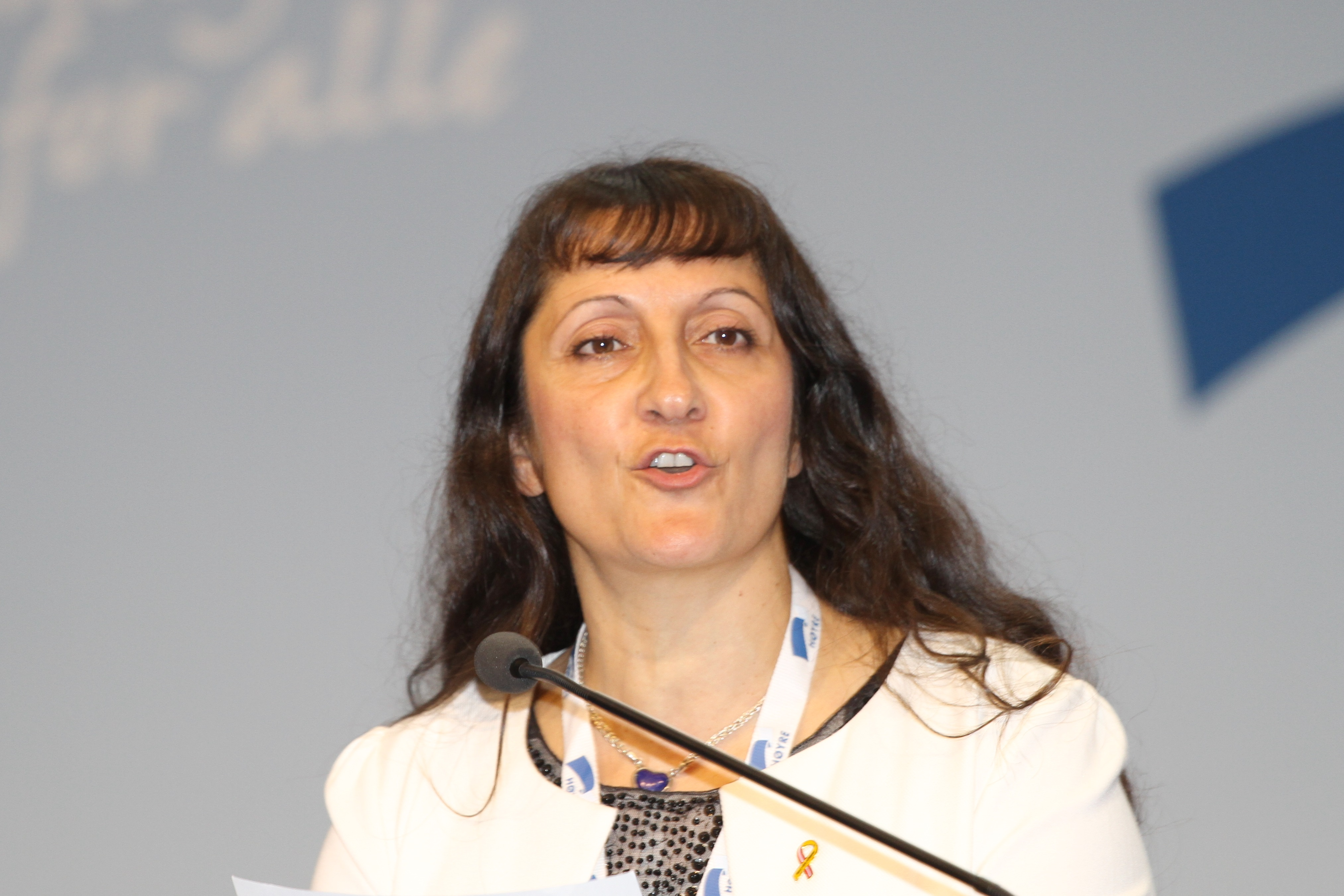
- Born: 20 June 1967 (age 59); Bulgaria
- Occupation: Politician
- Known for: Member of the Storting

Regina Alexandrova (born 20 June 1967) is a Norwegian politician for the Conservative Party.

== Biography ==
Alexandrova was born in Bulgaria on 20 June 1967.

A major in the Armed Forces, she located to Troms and served as a member of the municipal council of Bardu Municipality from 2007 to 2015. In the 2013 election, she was elected as deputy representative to the Parliament of Norway from Troms. From 2013 to 2016 she met regularly for cabinet member Elisabeth Aspaker as a member of the Standing Committee on Foreign Affairs and Defence.

She was again elected deputy to the Storting in 2017.
