= Lisbeth Berg-Hansen =

Norwegian politician (born 1963)

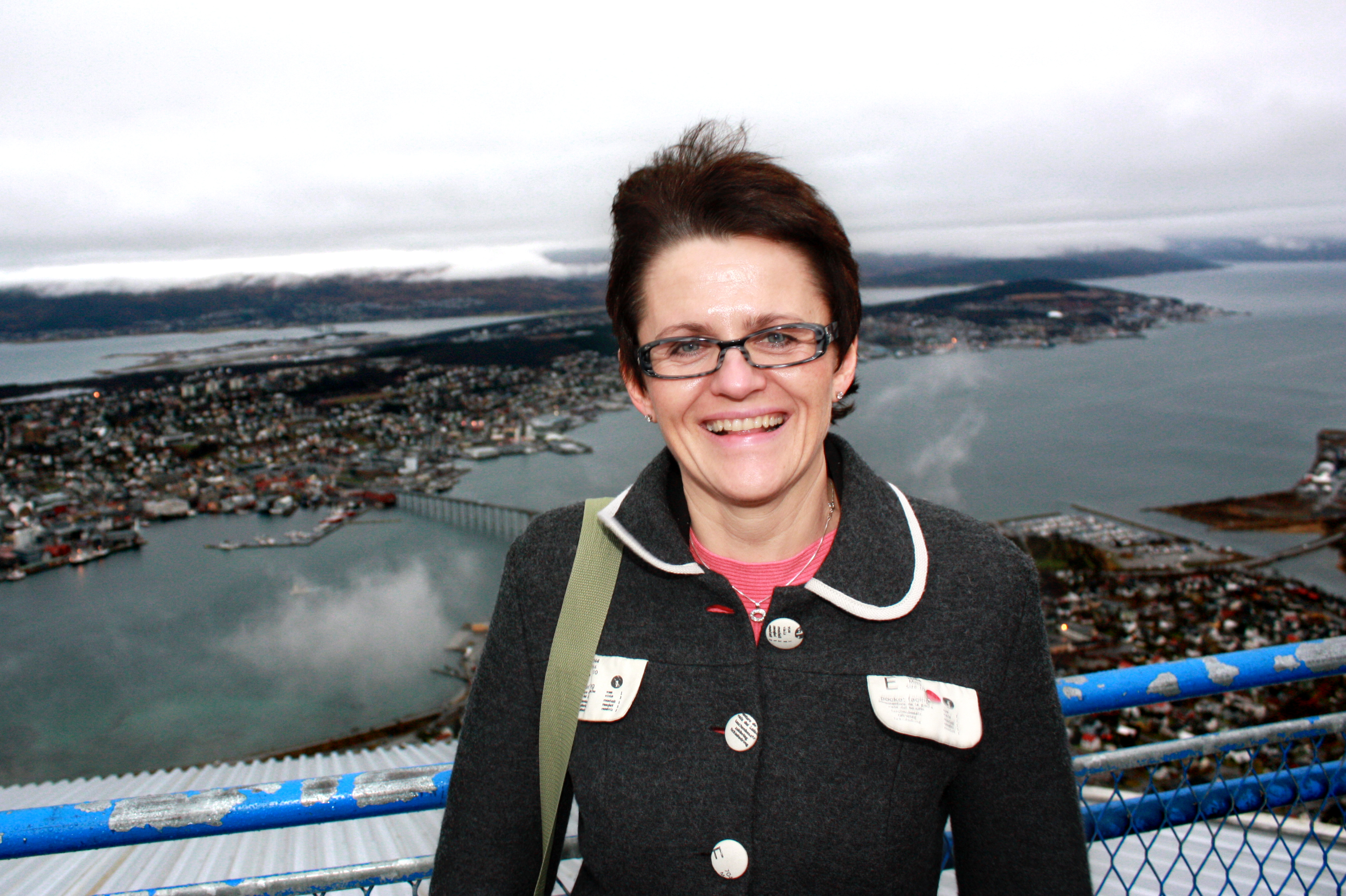
- Berg-Hansen in Tromsø

Minister of Fisheries
- In office 20 October 2009 – 16 October 2013
- Prime Minister: Jens Stoltenberg
- Preceded by: Helga Pedersen
- Succeeded by: Elisabeth Aspaker

Member of the Norwegian Parliament
- In office 1 October 2013 – 30 September 2017
- Constituency: Nordland

Personal details
- Born: 14 March 1963 (age 63) Bindal Municipality, Nordland, Norway
- Party: Labour

Lisbeth Berg-Hansen (born 14 March 1963) is a Norwegian businessperson and politician for the Labour Party.

She chaired the Norwegian Seafood Federation from 2002 to 2005, and was Vice President of the Confederation of Norwegian Enterprise from 2004 to 2008. In politics, she was a political advisor in the Ministry of Fisheries from 1992 to 1996, and State Secretary in the Office of the Prime Minister from 2000 to 2001. Between 20 October 2009 and 16 October 2013, she was appointed Minister of Fisheries and Coastal Affairs.

She is the deputy chair of the board of the Norwegian Institute of Marine Research, and a member of the board of Aker Seafoods, Fosen Trafikklag, Investinor (formerly known as Statens Investeringsselskap), SOS-barnebyer and Bodø University College.

She lives in Bindal Municipality.

== Conflict of interest ==
Berg-Hansen owns an 8% stake in SinkabergHansen AS, one of Norway's salmon farms, through Jmj Invest AS.

NMF, a Norwegian environmental group, filed charges against Berg-Hansen in 2009 claiming that her own economic interests prompted her to violate the regulations she's supposed to enforce.

In November 2013 a France 2 documentary accused Berg-Hansen of corruption in relaxing the legal levels of toxins allowed in fish in Norway while at leading health advisory committees and related research institutes, specifically the allowing of the pesticide chemical Ethoxyquin whose effects are relatively less researched and the minister having quashed funding for researchers who were about the report the dangerous effects of the pesticide including its ability to cross the blood brain barrier. Kurt Oddekalv, Norwegian environmental activist called her corrupt & rotten, similar to the Mafia, in the documentary.

Political offices
Preceded by Sylvia Brustad (acting); Helga Pedersen	Norwegian Minister of Fisheries and Coastal Affairs; 2009–2013	Succeeded by Elisabeth Aspaker
