= Johannes Gerckens Bassøe =

Norwegian jurist and civil servant

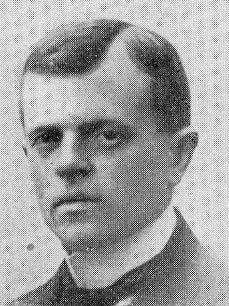

Governor of Vestfold
- In office 1938–1948
- Preceded by: Herman Meinich
- Succeeded by: Oscar Torp

Governor of Troms
- In office 1928–1938
- Preceded by: Otto Backe
- Succeeded by: Gunnar Bjørn Nordbye

Governor of Svalbard
- In office 1925–1933
- Preceded by: Edvard Lassen
- Succeeded by: Helge Ingstad

Personal details
- Born: 23 April 1878 Råde, Norway
- Died: 30 July 1962 (aged 84) Norway
- Citizenship: Norway
- Profession: Politician

Johannes Gerckens Bassøe (23 April 1878 – 30 July 1962) was a Norwegian jurist and civil servant. He is known as the first Governor of Svalbard, assuming office in October 1925, although there had been an Acting Governor since August. Bassøe was later County Governor of Troms and Vestfold.

== Career ==
Bassøe was born in Råde Municipality, and graduated from the University with the cand.jur. Degree in 1901. He had brief spells as a jurist in both Stavanger, Ålesund, Tromsø and Gjøvik before being hired as a secretary in the Ministry of Trade, Shipping and Industry in 1905. In 1913, this ministry was restructured, and Bassøe went to the Ministry of Foreign Affairs. He was promoted to assistant secretary in 1914, but left the Ministry of Foreign Affairs in 1916 when the Ministry of Trade was re-established.

On 4 September 1925 he was appointed as Norway's first permanent Governor of Svalbard, holding office to 1933. Assistant secretary Edvard Lassen had been Acting County Governor since August 1925, when the ceremonial Norwegian takeover of Svalbard had taken place. When Bassøe arrived at Svalbard in October 1925, though, the Norwegian administration of the archipelago was barely developed. Bassøe was not given his own office building, nor a private house. He spent the winter in a Barentsburg radio outpost that belonged to Televerket. The Mine Superintendent of Svalbard, Hans Merckoll, spent the winter in mainland Norway, leaving only Bassøe as an official representative. Most of the local infrastructure was provided by the mining company Store Norske Spitsbergen Kulkompani.

Bassøe was also County Governor of Troms from 1928 to 1938 and County Governor of Vestfold from 1938. During the German occupation of Norway, which lasted from 1940 to 1945, Bassøe was eventually found unacceptable by Nazi authorities. He was replaced by Halvor P. Hektoen in 1942, and after two years Christopher A. Lange took over. Following the liberation of Norway on 8 May 1945, Bassøe was reinstated. He retired in 1948.

Bassøe was decorated as a Grand Officer of the Italian Order of the Crown and a Commander, First Class of the Swedish Order of the North Star. He died in 1962.

Government offices
Preceded by Edvard Lassen (acting)	Governor of Svalbard; 1925–1933	Succeeded by Helge Ingstad
Preceded by Otto Backe	County Governor of Troms; 1928–1938	Succeeded by Gunnar Bjørn Nordbye
Preceded by Herman Meinich	County Governor of Vestfold; 1938–1948 (temporarily deposed during the German occupation of Norway 1942-1945)	Succeeded by Oscar Torp
