= Karl Adolf Langberg =

Norwegian civil servant and politician

Governor of Finnmarkens amt
- In office 1886–1889
- Preceded by: Carl Ingwart Theodor Rynning
- Succeeded by: Nikolai Prebensen

Personal details
- Born: 8 February 1850 Stavanger, Norway
- Died: 1 January 1889 (aged 38) Norway
- Citizenship: Norway
- Profession: Politician

Karl Adolf Langberg (1850–1889) was a Norwegian civil servant and politician. He served as the County Governor of Finnmarken county from 1886 until 1889.

Government offices
Preceded by Carl Ingwart Theodor Rynning	County Governor of Finnmarkens amt 1886–1889	Succeeded by Nikolai Prebensen
