= Taylor County Airport (Kentucky) =

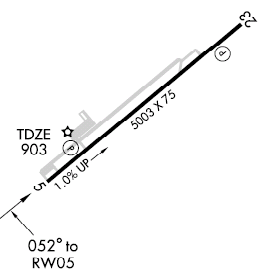
- IATA: none; ICAO: KAAS; FAA LID: AAS

Summary
- Airport type: Public
- Owner: Taylor County Airport Board
- Location: Campbellsville, Kentucky
- Elevation AMSL: 921 ft / 281 m
- Coordinates: 37°21′30″N 085°18′34″W
- Interactive map of Taylor County Airport

Runways
Direction	Length		Surface
Direction	ft	m	Surface
5/23	5,003	1,525	Asphalt

Statistics (2006)
- Aircraft operations: 10,200
- Source: Federal Aviation Administration

Taylor County Airport (ICAO: KAAS, FAA LID: AAS) is a county-owned public-use airport located two nautical miles (4 km) northeast of the central business district of Campbellsville, a city in Taylor County, Kentucky, United States.

Although most U.S. airports use the same three-letter location identifier for the FAA and IATA, Taylor County Airport is assigned AAS by the FAA but has no designation from the IATA (which assigned AAS to Apalapsili Airport in Apalapsili, Indonesia).

== Facilities and aircraft ==
Taylor County Airport covers an area of 106 acres (43 ha) at an elevation of 921 feet (281 m) above mean sea level. It has one asphalt paved runway designated 5/23 which measures 5,003 x 75 feet (1,525 x 23 m). For the 12-month period ending May 19, 2006, the airport had 10,200 aircraft operations, an average of 27 per day: 75% general aviation, 16% air taxi and 9% military.

== See also ==
- List of airports in Kentucky
