= Ragnvald Graff =

Norwegian barrister and military officer

Ragnvald Graff (30 December 1887 – 30 January 1975) was a Norwegian barrister and military officer.

He was born in Hamar, a son of county governor Truls Johannessen Wiel Graff and Bente Baastad. He graduated as military officer in 1909, and as cand.jur. in 1915. In 1923 he became a barrister with access to Supreme Court cases. He was member of several public commissions, as well as board member of the newspaper Morgenbladet and of various companies in the transport business. He was decorated Commander of the Order of the Phoenix, Commander of the Order of Christ, Knight of the Order of the Dannebrog, Knight of the Order of the Sword, Knight of the Order of Vasa, and Knight of the Order of the White Rose of Finland. He died in Vestre gravlund.
