= Christian Ulrik Kastrup =

Norwegian jurist, military officer and politician

Christian Ulrik Kastrup (1784 – 6 September 1850) was a Norwegian jurist, military officer and politician.

A jurist by education, from Stavanger, he worked as a military officer until 1811, when he became chief of customs in Vardø. In 1817 he became fut in the district Nordhordland og Voss. He was elected to the Norwegian Parliament from Søndre Bergenhus in 1821, 1822 and 1824. Political parties did not exist at the time.

He became County Governor of Finnmarkens amt in 1828, of Stavangers amt in 1829 and of Nordre Bergenhus amt in 1833. Originally governing from the market town of Bergen, he moved to Lærdalsøyri in 1840, becoming the second Nordre Bergenhus county governor to actually live in the county. He held the position until 1844.

Government offices
Preceded by Johan Caspar Krogh	County Governor of Finnmarkens amt 1828–1829	Succeeded by Ulrik Frederik Cappelen
Preceded by Peder Martinius Ottesen	County Governor of Stavangers amt 1829–1833	Succeeded by Gunder Aas
Preceded by Fredrik Riis	County Governor of Nordre Bergenhus amt 1833–1844	Succeeded by Hans Tostrup
