= Mathias Collett =

Norwegian civil servant

Mathias Collett (10 September 1708 – 24 March 1759) was a Norwegian civil servant.

Collett was born in Christiania (now Oslo), Norway. He was the son of merchant and city captain James Collett (1687-1724) and Karen Berg (1687-1744). He was the grandson of English-born, Norwegian merchant James Collett (1655–1727).

He served as County Governor of Finmarkens amt (now Finnmark) from 1750 to 1757, and County Governor of Christians Amt (now Oppland) from 1757 to 1759.

== See also ==
- Collett family

Preceded by Rasmus Kjeldsøn	County Governor of Finmarkens Amt; 1750–1757	Succeeded by Gunder Gundersen Hammer
Preceded by	County Governor of Christians Amt; 1757–1759	Succeeded by Christian Petersen
