= Vilgunn Gregusson =

Norwegian politician

Governor of Troms
- In office 2002–2005
- Preceded by: Leif Arne Heløe
- Succeeded by: Bård Magne Pedersen

Acting Governor of Troms
- In office 2000–2002

Personal details
- Born: 1936 Norway
- Citizenship: Norway
- Profession: Politician

Vilgunn Gregusson (born 1936) is a Norwegian civil servant and politician. She served as the County Governor of Troms county from 2000 until 2005 (although from 2000 to 2002 it was as "acting" governor).

Government offices
Preceded by Leif Arne Heløe	County Governor of Troms; 2000–2005 (acting governor from 2000 to 2002)	Succeeded by Bård Magne Pedersen (acting for Svein Ludvigsen)
