= Anton Theodor Harris =

Norwegian politician

Anton Theodor Harris (5 July 1804 – 6 March 1866) was a Norwegian politician.

In 1844, he was appointed as the newly created Diocesan Governor of Tromsø stiftamt. He was also appointed as the County Governor of Finmarkens Amt and County Governor of Tromsø amt as well (both were subordinate counties within the Diocese. In 1838 he was elected to the Norwegian Parliament in 1848, representing the city of Tromsø, where the Governor was seated. He was re-elected in 1851. He left his job in 1853 to become the County Governor of Stavangers Amt, a position he held from 1853 until his retirement in 1863.

He married Petronelle Kornelia Rye.

Government offices
New creation	Diocesan Governor of Tromsø stiftamt 1844–1853	Succeeded by Carl Frederik Motzfeldt
New creation	County Governor of Tromsø amt 1844–1853	Succeeded by Carl Frederik Motzfeldt
Preceded by Mons Lie (acting)	County Governor of Finnmarkens amt 1844–1853	Succeeded by Carl Frederik Motzfeldt
Preceded by Gunder Aas	County Governor of Stavangers amt 1853–1863	Succeeded by Vilhelm von Munthe af Morgenstierne
