= Otto Backe =

Norwegian politician

Governor of Troms
- In office 1921–1928
- Preceded by: Klaus Nord Hoel
- Succeeded by: Johannes Gerckens Bassøe

Personal details
- Born: 1874 Holmestrand, Norway
- Died: 1928 (aged 53–54) Norway
- Citizenship: Norway
- Profession: Politician

Otto Backe (1874–1928) was a Norwegian civil servant and politician. He served as the County Governor of Troms county from 1921 until 1928.

Government offices
Preceded by Klaus Nord Hoel	County Governor of Troms; 1921–1928	Succeeded by Johannes Gerckens Bassøe
