= List of county governors of Troms og Finnmark =

The county governor of Finnmark and Troms counties in Norway represents the central government administration in the county. The office of county governor is a government agency of the Kingdom of Norway; the title was Amtmann (before 1919), then Fylkesmann (from 1919 to 2020), and then Statsforvalteren (since 2021).

Troms og Finnmark county was created on 1 January 2020 when the old Troms and Finnmark counties were merged. The county governor offices of Troms and Finnmark counties were merged on 1 January 2019 in anticipation of the merger of the two counties.

The county governor is the government's representative in the county. The governor carries out the resolutions and guidelines of the Storting and government. This is done first by the county governor performing administrative tasks on behalf of the ministries. Secondly, the county governor also monitors the activities of the municipalities and is the appeal body for many types of municipal decisions.

== Names ==
The title of the office was originally Fylkesmann i Troms og Finnmark but on 1 January 2021, the title was changed to the gender-neutral Statsforvalteren i Troms og Finnmark.

== List of county governors ==
Troms og Finnmark has had the following governors:

County governors of Troms og Finnmark
Start	End	Name
1 Jan 2019	present	Elisabeth Aspaker (born 1962)

== See also ==
For the county governors of this area before 2018, see:

- List of county governors of Troms
- List of county governors of Finnmark
