= Mons Lie =

Norwegian police chief and writer

Mons Lie (15 February 1757 – 2 August 1827) was a Norwegian police chief and writer.

He was born as Mons Jonasen Storli, in the parish of Ålen in Søndre Trondhjem county, Norway. He was one of seven children born to Jonas Monssen Gjersvoll Storli (1715–1791) and Karen "Kari" Svendsdatter Aspaas (born 1717). His mother was a first cousin of Svend Aspaas.

In February 1777, he married Dorothea Wollan, but the marriage did not last. From October 1793 he was married to Elisabeth Sofie Müller (1772–1810). After her death he married Anna Margrethe Hagerup (1768–1840), a daughter of Christian Frederik Hagerup, in March 1811.

Mons Lie was the ancestor of several notable people. His grandson, Mons Lie (1803–1881), married a sister of Erik Røring Møinichen and had three daughters (Erika, Ida, and Thomasine). Another grandson, Michael Strøm Lie (1807–1852), was the father of writer Jonas Lie.

Lie made his way from the family farm Storli, via Røros where he was an errand boy for Peder Hjort, to the regional center Trondhjem where he was hired as a clerk for auditor-general Andreas Klingenberg. He advanced in the ranks within Klingenberg's business. From 1793 to 1811 he practised as an attorney (prokurator) in Trondhjem city. He was also fire chief from 1800, and member of the city's council (rådmann, must not be confused with the democratic city council introduced by law in 1837) from 1808. From 1817 to his death he was the chief of police in the city. He died in August 1827 in Trondhjem.

He was also a songwriter. Research points out that his songs were widespread in the 19th century, but only one song has been preserved in written form. "Sang for de trondhjemske Soldater" is found in O. Stuevold-Hansen's 1873 book Bygdefortælling. Optegnelser fra Tydalen, Annex til Sælbu as well as in a 1902 issue of Syn og Segn.

Government offices
Preceded by Ole Edvard Buck	Acting County Governor of Finnmarkens amt 1839–1845	Succeeded by Anton Theodor Harris
