= Anders John Aune =

Norwegian politician (1923–2011)

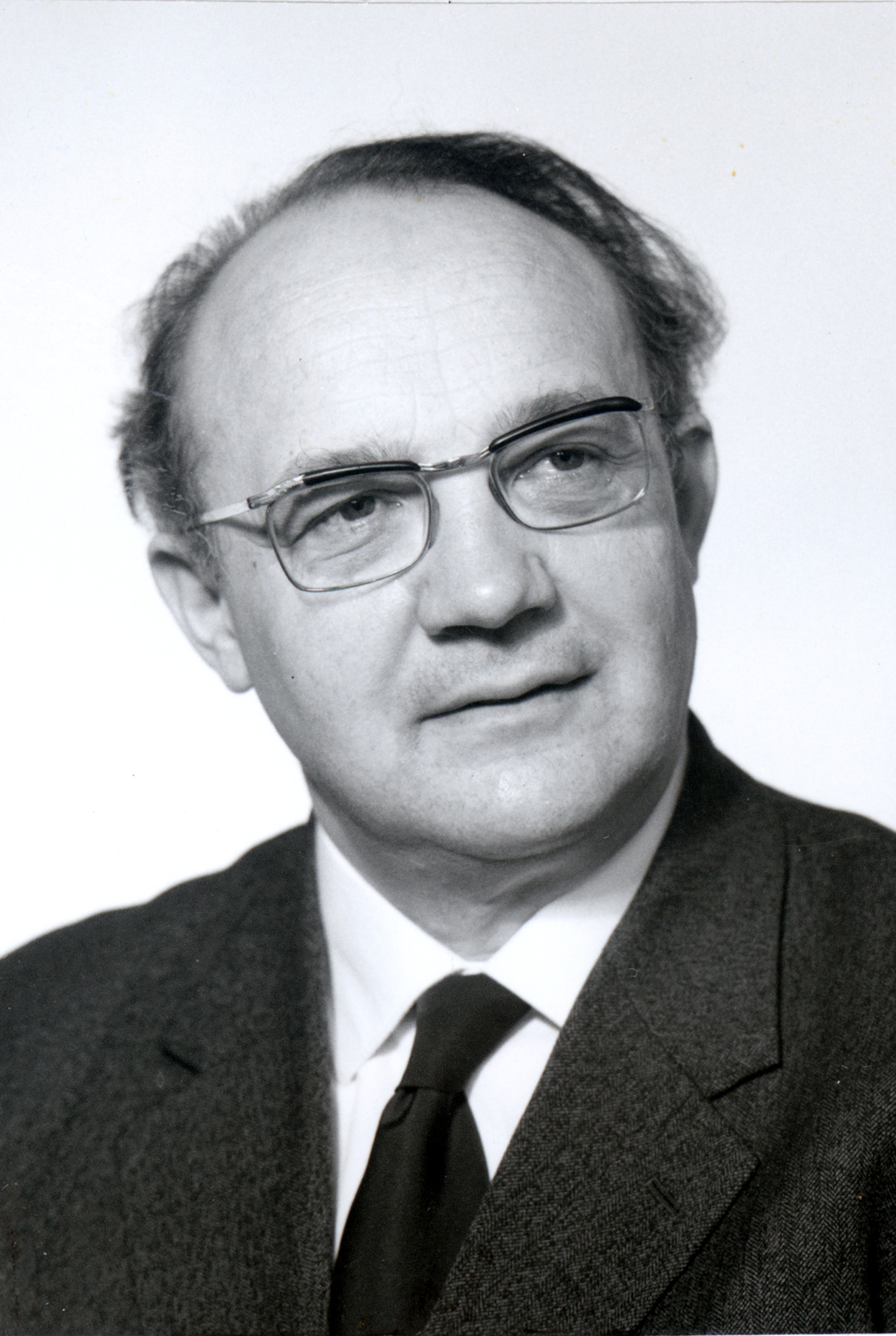

Member of the Norwegian Parliament for Finnmark (representative #2)
- In office 1969–1973
- Prime Minister: Per Borten (1969-1971); Trygve Bratteli (1971-1972); Lars Korvald (1972-1973)

Acting Governor of Finnmark
- In office Mar 1963 – July 1965
- Preceded by: Peder Holt
- Succeeded by: Kolbjørn Varmann

Governor of Finnmark
- In office 1976–1989
- Preceded by: Kolbjørn Varmann
- Succeeded by: Kurt Mosbakk (acting)

Member of the Norwegian Parliament for Finnmark (representative #2)
- In office 1989–1993
- Prime Minister: Jan P. Syse (1989-1990); Gro Harlem Brundtland (1990-1993)

Personal details
- Born: 1 May 1923 Stjørna Municipality, Norway
- Died: 13 November 2011 (aged 88)
- Citizenship: Norway
- Spouse: Sigrun Wedding Johannessen
- Parents: Andreas Aune (father); Josefa Dragland (mother)
- Education: Cand.jur. (1948)
- Alma mater: University of Oslo
- Profession: Politician

Anders John Aune (1 May 1923 – 13 November 2011) was a Norwegian politician. He was the county governor of Finnmark from 1974-1989. He was also a member of the Norwegian Parliament.

== Personal life ==
Anders Aune was born on 1 May 1923 in Stjørna Municipality in Sør-Trøndelag county, Norway. His parents were Andreas Aune, a municipal treasurer, and Josefa Dragland, a homemaker.

During the German occupation of Norway he took part in the Norwegian resistance. He was arrested in November 1943, sent from Stavern to Stettin in December 1943, then sent to Sennheim the same month and to Buchenwald one year later, where he remained until the war's end.

In 1953, he married Sigrun Wedding Johannessen. He died on 13 November 2011.

== Education and career ==
He graduated from the University of Oslo as cand.jur. in 1948 and worked as a civil servant. He was a member of the municipal council for Vadsø Municipality from 1951 to 1963, serving as deputy mayor in 1951–1952 and mayor in 1953–1955 and again from 1955–1959. He was also the director of a hospital in Finnmark from 1954-1959. In 1963, he was appointed to be the Acting County Governor of Finnmark since the newly appointed governor (Kolbjørn Varmann) was serving in the Storting and he wanted to fulfill his term in office before moving to Finnmark. Aune was acting governor until 1965 when Varmann could take up the role.

Originally a member of the Labour Party, Aune was elected to the Norwegian Parliament for Finnmark county in 1969, but was not re-elected in 1973. In 1974, Varmann resigned as county governor and Aune was appointed to replace him. He held this post from 1974 to 1989.

Aune had planned to retire after being county governor, but in the 1989 Norwegian parliamentary election, Aune stood for election for another party—a new party led by himself and called Future for Finnmark (Framtid for Finnmark). He was elected to the national parliament for this regional protest party, but again sat only one term. In 1993, he retired. In 1985, he was proclaimed Commander of the Royal Norwegian Order of St. Olav, and also received the Order of the White Rose.

Government offices
Preceded by Peder Holt	Acting County Governor of Finnmark; March 1963–July 1965 (acting for Kolbjørn Varmann who was serving in the Storting)	Succeeded by Kolbjørn Varmann
Preceded by Kolbjørn Varmann	County Governor of Finnmark; 1974–1989	Succeeded by Kurt Mosbakk (acting for Svein Alsaker)
