= Carl Ingwart Theodor Rynning =

Norwegian politician

Governor of Finnmarkens amt
- In office 1882–1885
- Preceded by: Johan Blackstad
- Succeeded by: Karl Adolf Langberg

Personal details
- Born: 17 January 1837 Hjartdal, Norway
- Died: 8 September 1892 (aged 55) Norderhov, Norway
- Citizenship: Norway
- Profession: Politician

Carl Ingwart Theodor Rynning (1837–1892) was a Norwegian government official and politician. He served as the County Governor of Finnmarken county from 1882 until 1885. He was also a representative in the Parliament of Norway from 1883 to 1885, representing Finnmark county.

Government offices
Preceded by Johan Blackstad	County Governor of Finnmarkens amt 1882–1885	Succeeded by Karl Adolf Langberg
