= Otto Gregussen =

Norwegian politician (born 1956)

Minister of Fisheries
- In office 17 March 2000 – 19 October 2001
- Prime Minister: Jens Stoltenberg
- Preceded by: Lars Peder Brekk
- Succeeded by: Svein Ludvigsen

State Secretary for the Ministry of Fisheries
- In office 7 January 1994 – 15 March 1996
- Prime Minister: Gro Harlem Brundtland
- Minister: Jan Henry T. Olsen

Political advisor for the Ministry of Fisheries
- In office 1 October 1992 – 7 January 1994
- Prime Minister: Gro Harlem Brundtland
- Minister: Jan Henry T. Olsen

Personal details
- Born: 15 September 1956 (age 69) Bodø, Norway
- Party: Labour

Otto Gregussen (born 15 September 1956) is a Norwegian politician for the Labour Party. He was political advisor to the Minister of Fisheries 1992–1994, state secretary to the Minister of Fisheries 1994–1996, and Minister of Fisheries 2000–2001 in the first cabinet Stoltenberg.
