= List of diocesan governors of Tromsø =

The diocesan governor of Tromsø stiftamt in Norway was a government agency of the Kingdom of Norway. The title was Stiftamtmann (before 1919) and in 1919 all stiftamt were abolished in favor of equal counties (Norwegian: fylker).

The stiftamt (diocesan county) of Tromsø was established in 1884 by the King when the Diocese of Trondhjem was divided. The new Tromsø stiftamt encompassed the whole Diocese of Tromsø and it was made up of three subordinate counties: Nordlandenes amt, Finmarkens amt, and Tromsø amt. In 1919, there was a large county reorganization in Norway and every stiftamt was abolished and the counties were renamed fylker.

== List of diocesan governors ==
The following is a list of the governors of the Tromsø stiftamt.

Diocesan governors of Tromsø stiftamt
Start	End	Name
1844	1853	Anton Theodor Harris (1804–1866); Served concurrently as Amtmann for Finmarkens amt. Served concurrently as Amtmann for Tromsø amt.
1854	1857	Carl Frederik Motzfeldt (1808–1902); Served concurrently as Amtmann for Finmarkens amt. Served concurrently as Amtmann for Tromsø amt.
1858	1869	Mathias Bonsach Krogh Nannestad (1815–1878); Served concurrently as Amtmann for Finmarkens amt (1858-1866). Served concurrently as Amtmann for Tromsø amt.
1869	1889	Christian Collett Kjerschow (1821–1889); Served concurrently as Amtmann for Tromsø amt.
1889	1914	Boye Christian Riis Strøm (1847–1930); Served concurrently as Amtmann for Tromsø amt.
1915	1918	Klaus Nord Hoel (1865–1923); Served concurrently as Amtmann for Tromsø amt.
Office abolished on 1 January 1919.
