= Elisabeth Aspaker =

Norwegian politician (born 1962)

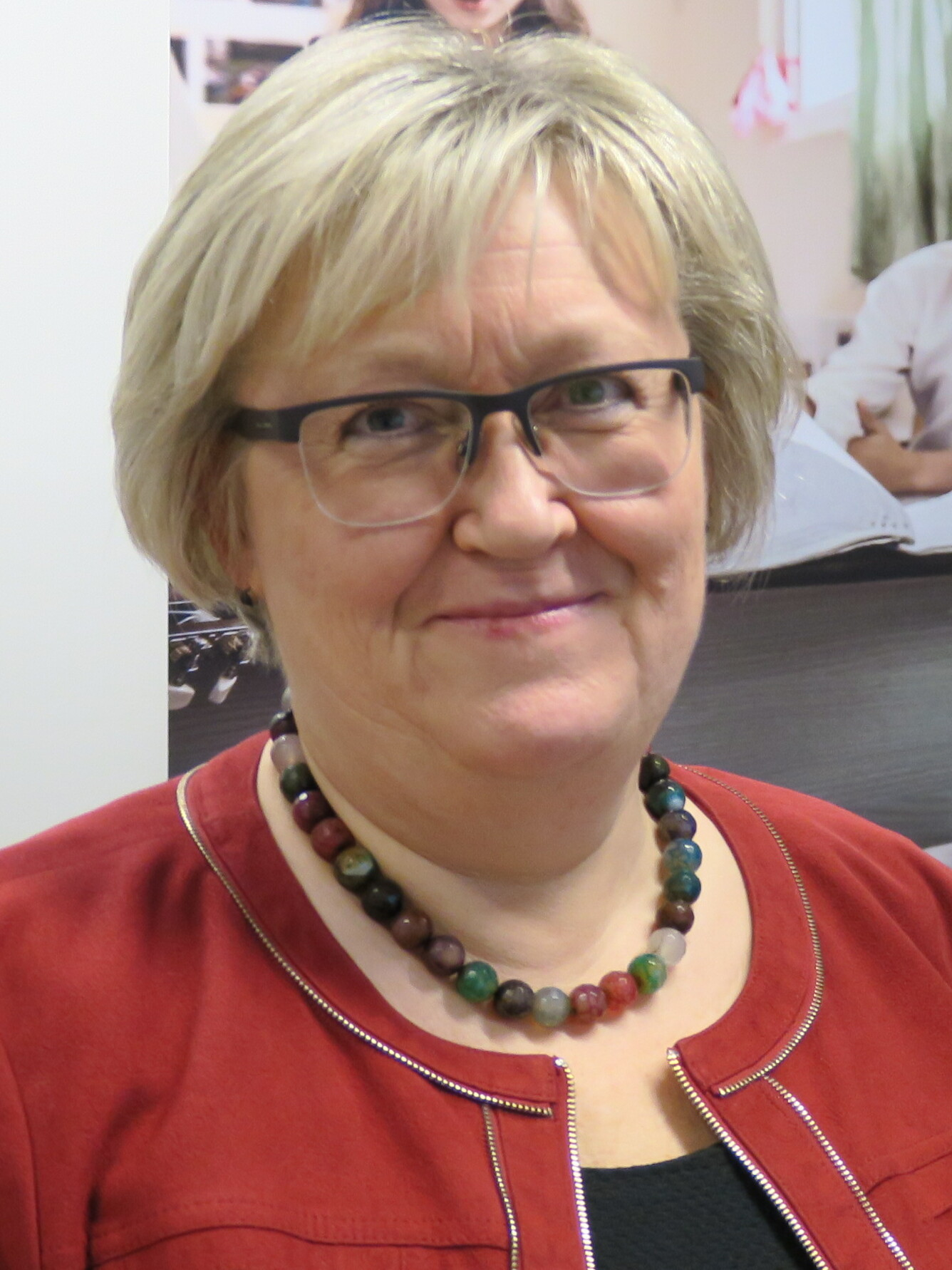
- Aspaker in 2016

County Governor of Troms og Finnmark
- Incumbent
- Assumed office 1 January 2019
- Monarch: Harald V
- Prime Minister: Erna Solberg; Jonas Gahr Støre
- Deputy: Stian Lindgård
- Preceded by: Position established

County Governor of Troms
- In office 30 October 2017 – 31 December 2018
- Monarch: Harald V
- Prime Minister: Erna Solberg
- Preceded by: Bård Magne Pedersen
- Succeeded by: Position abolished (merged with Finnmark)

Minister of European Affairs
- In office 16 December 2015 – 20 December 2016
- Prime Minister: Erna Solberg
- Preceded by: Vidar Helgesen
- Succeeded by: Frank Bakke-Jensen

Minister of Fisheries
- In office 16 October 2013 – 16 December 2015
- Prime Minister: Erna Solberg
- Preceded by: Lisbeth Berg-Hansen
- Succeeded by: Per Sandberg

Minister of Nordic Cooperation
- In office 16 October 2013 – 20 December 2016
- Prime Minister: Erna Solberg
- Preceded by: Rigmor Aasrud
- Succeeded by: Frank Bakke-Jensen

Member of the Storting
- In office 1 October 2005 – 30 September 2017
- Deputy: Regina Alexandrova (2013–2016)
- Constituency: Troms

Second Deputy Leader of the Conservative Party
- In office 10 April 1994 – 29 March 1998
- Leader: Jan Petersen
- Preceded by: John G. Bernander
- Succeeded by: Anne Berit Andersen

Personal details
- Born: 16 October 1962 (age 63) Harstad, Troms, Norway
- Party: Conservative
- Education: University of Tromsø

Elisabeth Vik Aspaker (born 16 October 1962) is a Norwegian politician for the Conservative Party and she is the current county governor of Troms og Finnmark county. She was also the Minister of European Affairs from 2015 to 2016 and Minister for Nordic Cooperation from 2013 to 2016. From 2013 to 2015, she also served as Minister of Fisheries.

She was elected to the Norwegian Parliament from Troms in 2005. She previously served as a deputy representative to the Norwegian Parliament during the terms 1989–1993 and 1997–2001.

From 1986 to 1990 she was the deputy leader of the Norwegian Young Conservatives. During the cabinet Syse, she was private secretary (today known as political advisor) in the Ministry of Justice and the Police. During the second cabinet Bondevik, she was appointed political advisor in the Ministry of Education and Research before being promoted to State Secretary in the Ministry of Health and Care Services in 2004.

She was first nominated as county governor of Troms in 2014 and assumed office in late October 2017 after completing her term in parliament. She continued in the position after Troms was merged with Finnmark. She retained her position despite the counties being split again in 2024. In May the same year, she announced that she wouldn't seek re-appointment to the position and would step down by the end of the year.

On the local level she was a member of Harstad municipal council from 1991 to 1995, and of its executive committee from 1999 to 2001. From 1991 to 1999 she was a member of Troms county council, serving as deputy county mayor beginning in 1995.

Before entering politics, she worked as a teacher. Aspaker was educated at Tromsø lærerhøgskole and Harstad University College, both of which today is a part of the University of Tromsø.

Government offices
Preceded by Position established	County Governor of Troms and Finnmark; 2019–present	Incumbent
Preceded by Bård Magne Pedersen	County Governor of Troms; 2017–2018	Succeeded by Position abolished
Political offices
Preceded by Vidar Helgesen	Minister of European Affairs; 2015–2016	Succeeded by Frank Bakke-Jensen
Preceded by Lisbeth Berg-Hansen	Minister of Fisheries; 2013–2015	Succeeded by Per Sandberg
Preceded by Rigmor Aasrud	Minister of Nordic Cooperation; 2013–2016	Succeeded by Frank Bakke-Jensen
