= Fredrik Wilhelm Wedel-Jarlsberg =

Danish-Norwegian baron and government official

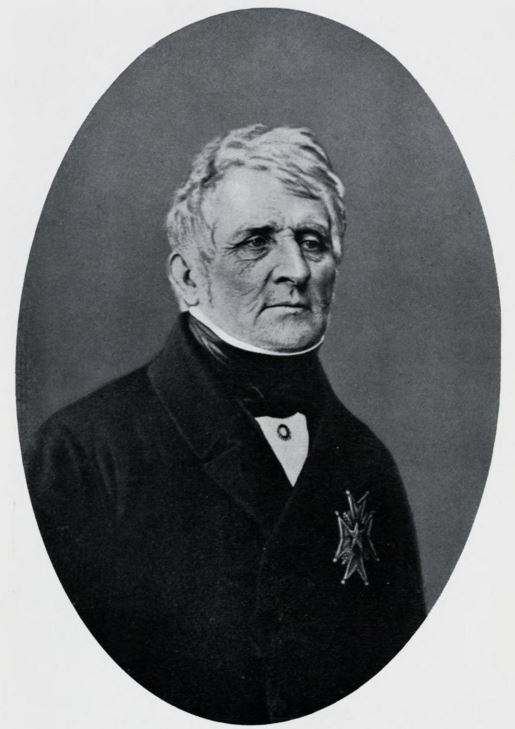

Governor of Bratsberg amt
- In office 1813–1838
- Preceded by: Severin Løvenskiold
- Succeeded by: Carl Valentin Falsen

Governor of Finnmarkens amt
- In office 1811–1813
- Preceded by: Hilmar Meincke Krohg
- Succeeded by: Johan Caspar Krogh

Personal details
- Born: 22 May 1787 Viborg, Denmark
- Died: 26 July 1863 (aged 76) Larvik, Norway
- Citizenship: Denmark-Norway

Fredrik Wilhelm Wedel-Jarlsberg (1787–1863) was a Danish-Norwegian baron and government official. He was a descendant of the Counts of Wedel-Jarlsberg. He served as the County Governor of Finnmark county from 1811 until 1813. He was then transferred to Bratsberg county to be the County Governor there. He held that post from 1813 until 1838. After his time as governor, he became a customs inspector based in Porsgrunn and then in 1844 he moved to the same position in Larvik. He retired in 1859.

Government offices
Preceded by Hilmar Meincke Krohg	County Governor of Finnmarkens amt 1811–1813	Succeeded by Johan Caspar Krogh
Preceded by Severin Løvenskiold	County Governor of Bratsberg amt 1813–1838	Succeeded by Carl Valentin Falsen
