= Johan Caspar Krogh =

Norwegian politician

Governor of Finnmarkens amt
- In office 1814–1828
- Preceded by: Fredrik W. Wedel-Jarlsberg
- Succeeded by: Christian Ulrik Kastrup

Personal details
- Born: 23 September 1776 Davik, Norway
- Died: 8 September 1831 (aged 54) Bergen, Norway
- Citizenship: Norway
- Profession: Politician

Johan Caspar Krogh (1776–1831) was a Norwegian government official and politician. He served as the County Governor of Finnmark county from 1814 until 1828. He was also elected to the Parliament of Norway in 1824, serving until 1826 when his health began to decline.

Government offices
| Preceded by Fredrik Wilhelm Wedel-Jarlsberg | County Governor of Finnmarkens amt 1814–1828 | Succeeded by Christian Ulrik Kastrup |
