= Svein Ludvigsen =

Norwegian politician

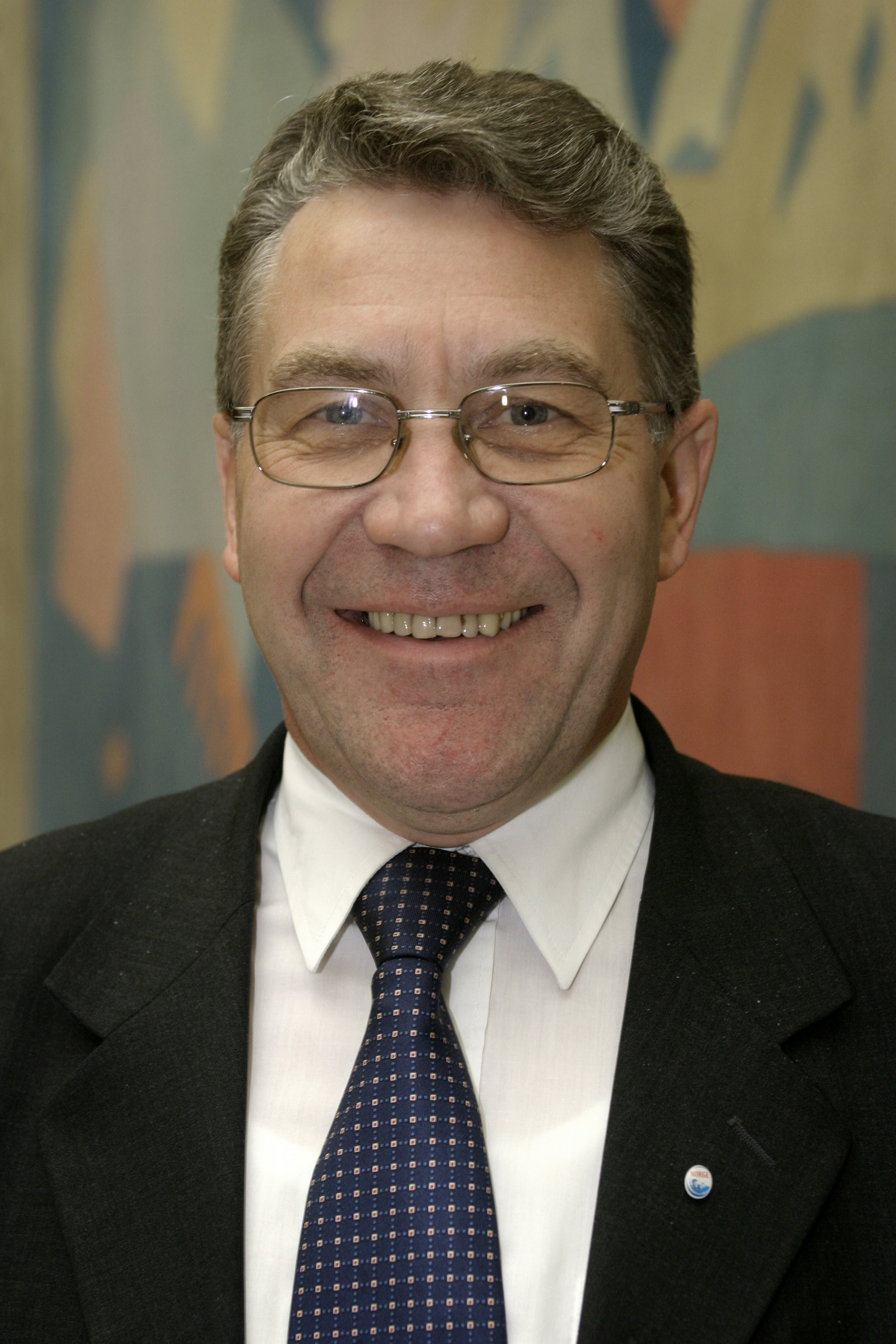
- Ludvigsen in 2003

County Governor of Troms
- In office 17 January 2006 – 18 July 2014
- Prime Minister: Jens Stoltenberg; Erna Solberg
- Preceded by: Vilgunn Gregusson
- Succeeded by: Bård Magne Pedersen

Minister of Fisheries
- In office 19 October 2001 – 17 October 2005
- Prime Minister: Kjell Magne Bondevik
- Preceded by: Otto Gregussen
- Succeeded by: Helga Pedersen

Minister of Nordic Cooperation
- In office 19 October 2001 – 17 October 2005
- Prime Minister: Kjell Magne Bondevik
- Preceded by: Jørgen Kosmo
- Succeeded by: Heidi Grande Røys

Second Deputy Leader of the Conservative Party
- In office 5 May 1990 – 20 April 1991
- Leader: Jan P. Syse
- Preceded by: Petter Thomassen
- Succeeded by: John G. Bernander

Member of the Norwegian Parliament
- In office 1 October 1989 – 30 September 2001
- Constituency: Troms

Personal details
- Born: Svein Harald Ludvigsen; 18 July 1946 (age 79) Hillesøy, Troms, Norway
- Party: Conservative

Svein Harald Ludvigsen (born 18 July 1946) is a Norwegian former politician for the Conservative Party and a convicted sex offender. He served as a member of parliament (1989–2001), deputy leader of the Conservative Party (1990–1991), minister of fisheries (2001–2005), and county governor of Troms (2006–2014). In 2019 he was convicted of sexually abusing three young men, and sentenced to five years imprisonment; his conviction and sentence became final in January 2020.

== Political career ==
Ludvigsen was born in Hillesøy Municipality, the son of a fishing boat captain. Before entering politics Ludvigsen worked as a businessman and local banker. On the local level, Ludvigsen was a member of the executive committee of Tromsø Municipality council in the periods from 1971–1975, 1979–1983, and 1987–1989. He has chaired the municipal and county party chapters, and from 1990 to 1991 he was deputy leader of the Conservative Party nationwide.

He was elected to the Norwegian Parliament from Troms county in 1989, and was re-elected on two occasions. From 2001 to 2005, when the second Bondevik cabinet held office, Ludvigsen was Minister of Fisheries and Coastal Affairs. In 2001, he was appointed County Governor of Troms, but because of his job as cabinet minister he assumed the office on 17 January 2006.

== Conviction for sexual abuse ==
On the 4 July 2019, he was convicted of abusing his position to gain sexual favours from three vulnerable male persons and sentenced to five years imprisonment.

Government offices
Preceded by Otto Gregussen	Norwegian Minister of Fisheries and Coastal Affairs; 2001–2005	Succeeded by Helga Pedersen
Preceded by Vilgunn Gregusson	County Governor of Troms; 2006–2014	Succeeded by Bård Magne Pedersen (acting)
