= Truls Johannessen Wiel Graff =

Norwegian county governor

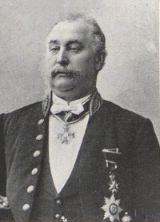

Truls Johannessen Wiel Graff (16 April 1851 – 1918) was a Norwegian county governor.

He was the youngest living son of captain Christian Fredrik Graff (1818–1893) and Cathrine Magdalene Bull Wiel. In 1882 he married Benta Tomine Marie Cathrine Baastad. Their son Ragnvald Graff became a major and barrister.

In 1890 he was the acting County Governor of Hedmark, and from 1896 to 1906 he served as the County Governor of Finnmark.

Government offices
Preceded by Ludvig R. Kyhn	County Governor of Hedemarkens amt 1890 (acting)	Succeeded by Oscar Mørch
Preceded by Nikolai Christian Grove Prebensen	County Governor of Finnmarkens amt 1896–1906	Succeeded by Andreas Tostrup Urbye
