= Hagbarth Lund =

Norwegian politician (1877–1963)

Member of the Norwegian Parliament for Finnmark (representative #2)
- In office 1913–1924
- Prime Minister: Gunnar Knudsen (1913–1920); Otto Bahr Halvorsen (1920–1921); Otto Blehr (1921–1923); Otto Bahr Halvorsen (1923); Abraham Berge (1923–1924)

Governor of Finnmark
- In office 1922–1928
- Preceded by: Johan Albrigt Rivertz
- Succeeded by: Hans Gabrielsen

Member of the Norwegian Parliament for Market towns of Nordland, Troms and Finnmark
- In office 1928–1930
- Prime Minister: Christopher Hornsrud (1928); Johan Ludwig Mowinckel (1928–1930)

Governor of Vest-Agder
- In office 1928–1948
- Preceded by: Daniel Bremer Juell Koren
- Succeeded by: Alf Frydenberg

Personal details
- Born: 5 March 1877 Kristiania, Norway
- Died: 23 July 1963 (aged 86) Norway
- Citizenship: Norway
- Education: Cand.jur. (1903)
- Profession: Politician

Hagbarth Lund (1877–1963) was a Norwegian lawyer and politician. He served as the County Governor of Finnmark county from 1922 until 1928 and then he was the County Governor of Vest-Agder county from 1928 until 1948.

== Personal life ==
Hagbarth Lund was born on 5 March 1877 in Kristiania, Norway. His father, Eilert Christian Lund, was a ship's captain. His mother was Mary Falch. Hagbarth Lund married Dagny Bøckmann in 1915. He died on 23 July 1963.

== Education and career ==
Lund graduated from the Kristiania Cathedral School in 1897. He then received his cand.jur. degree in 1903. He practiced as a prosecutor in Tana Municipality from 1907 to 1922. During that time he also served several other roles. He was the mayor of Tana Municipality from 1908 to 1916, having run for the Liberal Party. From 1910 to 1914 he was a member of Finnmark County Committee. In 1913, he was elected to the Storting (Norwegian Parliament), representing Finnmark county, a seat he held until 1924.

In 1922, he was appointed to be the County Governor of Finnmark county, so he left parliament and a deputy filled in for the rest of his term which ended in 1924. From 1925 to 1930 he was elected as a deputy representative to Parliament representing the Market towns of Nordland, Troms and Finnmark, meaning he only served in Parliament if the representative was unable. This was the case from 1928 to 1930, where he served almost the whole period.

In 1928, he was appointed to be the County Governor in Vest-Agder county. He continued in that role until the German occupation of Norway. He resigned in 1941 rather than support the Nasjonal Samling government, but after the liberation of Norway, he resumed his job until his retirement in 1948. From 1942 to 1945 while Lund was not governor, Iver Leuch Elieson was the German-occupation government's governor of Vest-Agder.

Government offices
Preceded by Johan Albrigt Rivertz	County Governor of Finnmark; 1922–1928	Succeeded by Hans Gabrielsen
Preceded by Daniel Bremer Juell Koren	County Governor of Vest-Agder; 1928–1941	Succeeded by Iver Leuch Elieson; German occupation governor
Preceded by Iver Leuch Elieson; German occupation governor	County Governor of Vest-Agder; 1945–1948	Succeeded by Alf Frydenberg
