= Lars Kristian Abrahamsen =

Norwegian politician (1855–1921)

Lars Abrahamsen
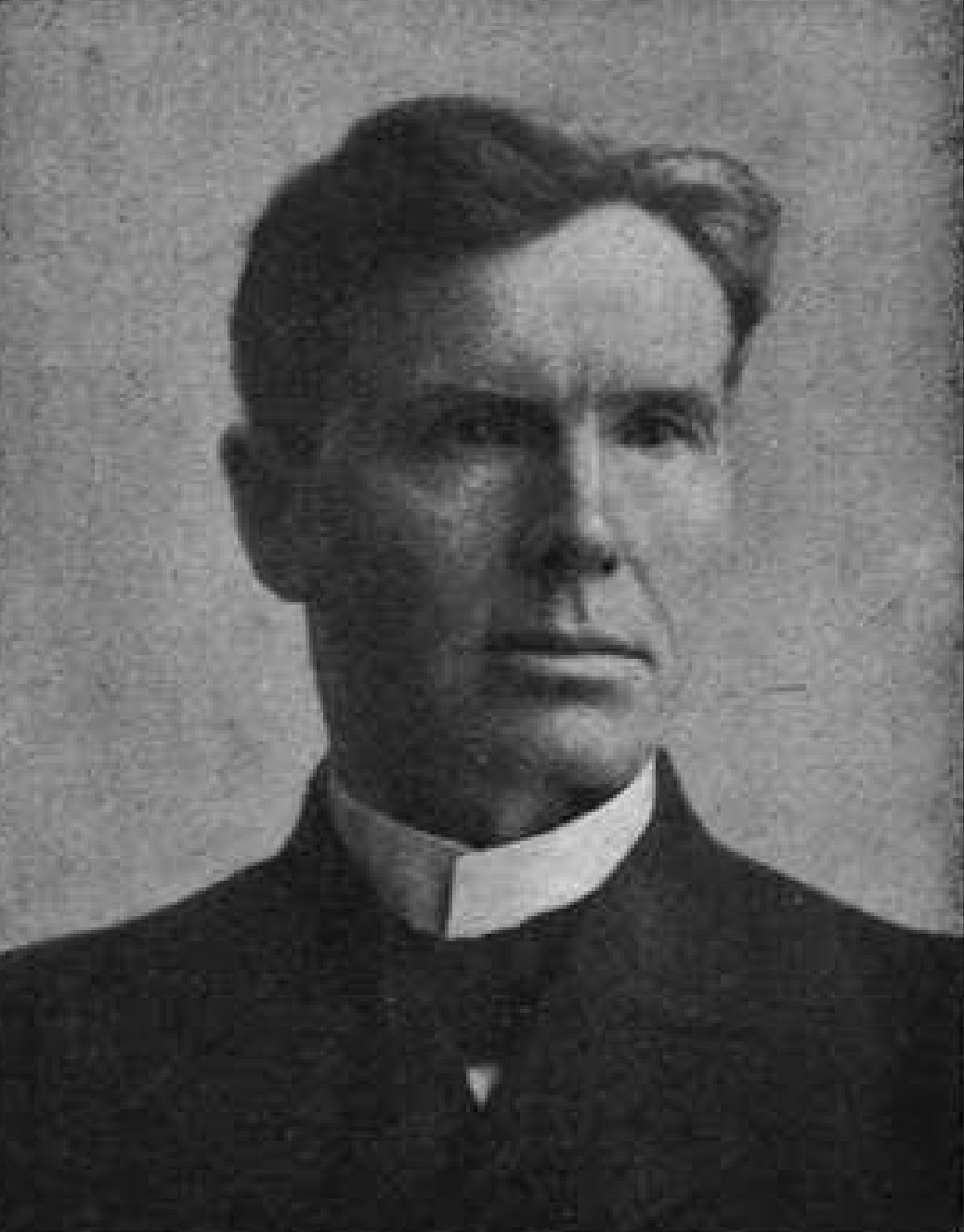

Minister of Social Affairs
- In office 1 October 1916 – 20 February 1919
- Prime Minister: Gunnar Knudsen
- Preceded by: Kristian Friis Petersen
- Succeeded by: Paal Berg

Minister of Justice
- In office 31 January 1913 – 26 July 1916
- Prime Minister: Gunnar Knudsen
- Preceded by: Fredrik Stang
- Succeeded by: Andreas Urbye

Minister of Trade
- In office 19 March 1908 – 2 February 1910
- Prime Minister: Gunnar Knudsen
- Preceded by: Sofus Arctander
- Succeeded by: Sofus Arctander

Personal details
- Born: Lars Kristian Abrahamsen; 18 October 1855 Hedrum Municipality, Vestfold, United Kingdoms of Sweden and Norway
- Died: 21 July 1921 (aged 65) Christiania, Norway
- Party: Liberal
- Profession: Lawyer

Lars Kristian Abrahamsen (18 October 1855 – 21 July 1921) was a Norwegian politician for the Liberal Party. A district stipendiary magistrate by profession, he served in Gunnar Knudsen's first and second cabinets (1908–1910 and 1913–1920). He was Minister of Trade (1908–1910), Minister of Justice (1913–1916), and Minister of Social Affairs (1916–1919). Abrahamsen resigned on 20 February 1919.
