= Herman Meinich =

Norwegian government official (1868–1948)

Governor of Vesfold
- In office 1924–1938
- Preceded by: Abraham Berge
- Succeeded by: Johannes Gerckens Bassøe

Personal details
- Born: 2 February 1868 Bergen, Norway
- Died: 14 October 1948 (aged 80) Oslo, Norway
- Citizenship: Norway
- Occupation: Politician

Jørgen Herman Meinich (2 February 1868 – 14 October 1948) was a Norwegian jurist and politician for the Conservative Party. He served in the Norwegian Parliament and he also served as the County Governor of Vestfold county from 1924 until 1938.

== Personal life ==
Meinich was born in Bergen, Norway. He was the son of county commissioner Hans Thomas Meinich and his wife Eveline Stenersen. He died in Oslo.

== Education and career ==
He received his Cand.jur. degree in 1890. In 1893 he was employed in the Ministry of Finance, and in 1895 he was hired as the acting magistrate in Ringerike. In 1901 he was appointed as a head of department within the Ministry of Finance. In 1905, he moved to Tromsø where he was city clerk. He became the deputy mayor in Tromsø for the term 1907–1908. In 1909 he was mayor of Tromsø. After this he was hired as a court-martial judge.

Meinich was elected to the Storting from the Tromsø constituency for the 1910–1912 term. In 1918, he moved to Jarlsberg where he was hired as a magistrate for Mellom Jarlsberg, a job he held until 1923. In 1922, he was elected to the Storting for another two-year term, this time for the Market towns of Vestfold county constituency. He is said to have turned down cabinet posts on the grounds that he could do more good for himself at the local level.

In 1924, he was appointed County Governor of Vestfold, an office he held until 1938. As county governor, he was involved in the implementation of many major tasks, such as the construction of the Vrengen Bridge, the rebuilding of the Vestfoldbanen railway, the modernization of the county's road system, and the expansion of the county hospital. In 1934, he was appointed a knight of the 1st class of the Order of St. Olav. He retired in 1938 and moved to Oslo.

Government offices
Preceded by Abraham Berge	County Governor of Vestfold; 1924–1938	Succeeded by Johannes Gerckens Bassøe
