= Kristian Even Haug =

Norwegian lawyer and politician

Governor of Troms
- In office 1953–1976
- Preceded by: Arne Aas
- Succeeded by: Martin Buvik

Personal details
- Born: 11 December 1906 Kristiania, Norway
- Died: 2000 (aged 93–94) Tromsø, Norway
- Citizenship: Norway
- Profession: Politician

Kristian Even Haug (11 December 1906 – 2000) was a Norwegian lawyer and politician. He served as the County Governor of Troms county from 1953 until his retirement in 1976.

Government offices
Preceded by Arne Aas	County Governor of Troms; 1953–1976	Succeeded by Martin Buvik
