= Mathias Bonsach Krogh Nannestad =

Norwegian civil servant and politician

Governor of Tromsø amt
- In office 1866–1869
- Preceded by: Carl Frederik Motzfeldt
- Succeeded by: Christian Collett Kjerschow

Governor of Finnmarkens amt
- In office 1858–1866
- Preceded by: Carl Frederik Motzfeldt
- Succeeded by: Jens Holmboe

Personal details
- Born: 14 October 1815 Ørland, Norway
- Died: 17 March 1878 (aged 62) Drøbak, Norway
- Citizenship: Norway
- Profession: Politician

Mathias Bonsach Krogh Nannestad (14 October 1815 – 17 March 1878) was a Norwegian civil servant and politician. He served as the Diocesan Governor of Tromsø stiftamt from 1858 until 1869. He also served simultaneously as the County Governor of both Finnmark and Tromsø counties from 1858 until 1866. In 1866, Jens Holmboe took over as County Governor of Finnmark and Nannestad continued on as the County Governor of Tromsø county until his retirement in 1869.

Government offices
Preceded by Carl Frederik Motzfeldt	Diocesan Governor of Tromsø stiftamt 1858–1869	Succeeded by Christian Collett Kjerschow
Preceded by Carl Frederik Motzfeldt	County Governor of Finnmarkens amt 1858–1866	Succeeded by Jens Holmboe
Preceded by Carl Frederik Motzfeldt	County Governor of Tromsø amt 1858–1869	Succeeded by Christian Collett Kjerschow
