= Klaus Nord Hoel =

Norwegian civil servant and politician

Governor of Troms
- In office 1915–1920
- Preceded by: Boye Strøm
- Succeeded by: Otto Backe

Personal details
- Born: 1865 Norway
- Died: 1923 (aged 57–58) Norway
- Citizenship: Norway
- Profession: Politician

Klaus Nord Hoel (1865–1923) was a Norwegian civil servant and politician. He served as the last Diocesan Governor of Tromsø stiftamt from 1915 until its dissolution on 31 Dec 1918. He simultaneously served as the County Governor of Troms county from 1915 until his retirement in 1920.

Government offices
Preceded by Boye Christian Riis Strøm	Diocesan Governor of Tromsø stiftamt 1915–1918	Office abolished
Preceded by Boye Christian Riis Strøm	County Governor of Tromsø amt 1915–1920	Succeeded by Otto Backe
