= Christian Collett Kjerschow =

Norwegian politician

Christian Collett Hersleb Kjerschow

Governor of Tromsø amt
- In office 1869–1889
- Preceded by: Mathias Nannestad
- Succeeded by: Boye Strøm

Personal details
- Born: 23 August 1821 Aker, Norway
- Died: 10 April 1889 (aged 67) Tromsø, Norway
- Citizenship: Norway
- Profession: Politician

Christian Collett Hersleb Kjerschow (23 August 1821 – 10 April 1889) was a Norwegian politician.

He was born in Aker as the oldest son of bishop Peder Christian Hersleb Kjerschow (1786–1866) and his wife Johanne Benedicte Collett (1802–1851). His younger sister Caroline Sophie Erasmine Kjerschow married businessman Jacob Andreas Michelsen, and was the mother of Christian Michelsen. Christian Kjerschow was also a maternal grandson of mining director Christian Ancher Collett.

Christian Collett Kjerschow married Nancy Adelaide Esbensen. They had several children. In the 1902 census his family were registered with two servants. Their sons Peder and Karald and grandson Arild all became jurists.

Christian Collett Kjerschow was elected from the constituency Tromsø, Hammerfest, Vardø og Vadsø to the Norwegian Parliament in 1868. At that time he served as stipendiary magistrate (byfoged) and chief of police. He then served as County Governor of Tromsøe Amt from 1869 to 1889.

Government offices
| Preceded by Mathias Bonsach Krogh Nannestad | Diocesan Governor of Tromsø stiftamt 1869–1889 | Succeeded by Boye Christian Riis Strøm |
| Preceded by Mathias Bonsach Krogh Nannestad | County Governor of Tromsø amt 1869–1889 | Succeeded by Boye Christian Riis Strøm |
