= Kurt Mosbakk =

Norwegian politician

Minister of Trade and Shipping
- In office 9 May 1986 – 13 June 1988
- Prime Minister: Gro Harlem Brundtland
- Preceded by: Asbjørn Haugstvedt
- Succeeded by: Jan Balstad

Acting Governor of Finnmark
- In office January 1990 – May 1990
- Preceded by: Anders John Aune
- Succeeded by: Ingrid Røstad Fløtten

Personal details
- Born: 21 November 1934 (age 91) Orkdal Municipality, Sør-Trøndelag, Norway
- Citizenship: Norway
- Party: Labour
- Parents: Henrik Mosbakk (father); Jenny Mathea Traasdahl (mother)
- Education: Harvard University (1966)
- Profession: Politician

Kurt Mosbakk (born 21 November 1934) is a Norwegian politician for the Labour Party. He was Minister of Trade and Shipping from 1986 to 1987, when the ministry was closed; he continued on as the Minister of Trade and Shipping Affairs at the Norwegian Ministry of Foreign Affairs until June 1988. He served as the acting County Governor of Finnmark county for about five months during 1990.

== Personal life ==
He was born on 21 November 1934 in Orkdal Municipality in Sør-Trøndelag county, Norway. He was the son of a joiner and a housewife, Henrik and Jenny Marthea Mosbakk.

== Education and career ==
Mosbakk took his primary and secondary education in Orkanger and Trondheim respectively, before taking higher education at the Norwegian School of Economics and Business Administration from 1955 to 1958 and Harvard University from 1965 to 1966.

From 1964 to 1965, under the fourth cabinet Gerhardsen, he worked as a personal secretary (today known as political advisor) in the Ministry of Defence. He had been chairman of the Workers' Youth League in Oslo from 1961 to 1963, and deputy chairman of the Workers' Youth League nationally from 1964 to 1967. The chairman at that time was Ola Teigen.

He worked as an office clerk for the Norwegian Confederation of Trade Unions from 1969 to 1974. During this period, he had a career in local politics as deputy mayor of Lørenskog Municipality and a member of the Akershus county council, both from 1971 to 1974. He chaired the county chapter of the Labour Party from 1969 to 1974. He also served as a deputy representative to the Norwegian Parliament during the term 1973–1977.

Mosbakk then worked as chief administrative officer in Finnmark County Municipality from 1976 to 1986. In 1986, he was appointed to be the Minister of Trade and Shipping in the second cabinet Brundtland. As the Ministry of Trade and Shipping was discontinued as of 1 January 1988, Mosbakk was transferred to a new position, that of Chief of Trade and Shipping Affairs in the Ministry of Foreign Affairs. He left on 13 June 1988. He returned to civil life as chief administrative officer in Østfold County Municipality from 1986 to 1997, with the exception of half a year as the acting County Governor of Finnmark in 1990.

Mosbakk was a member of the board of Framfylkingen from 1972 to 1974 and the Norwegian State Housing Bank from 1978 to 1986. He was then chairman of the board of the Norwegian State Housing Bank from 1988 to 1998, and of the bank SpareBank 1 Nord-Norge from 1989 to 2000.

Political offices
| Preceded by Asbjørn Haugstvedt | Norwegian Minister of Trade and Shipping; 9 May 1986–1 January 1988 | Ministerial post abolished |
| New ministerial post | Chief of Trade and Shipping Affairs at the Norwegian Ministry of Foreign Affairs; 1 January 1988–13 June 1988 | Succeeded by Jan Balstad |
Government offices
| Preceded by Anders John Aune | County Governor of Finnmark; January 1990–May 1990 (acting for Svein Alsaker) | Succeeded by Ingrid Røstad Fløtten (acting for Svein Alsaker) |
