= Johan Blackstad =

Norwegian judge and politician

Johan Blackstad (16 November 1832 – 8 November 1904) was a Norwegian judge and politician for the Conservative Party.

He was born in Bergen and took the cand.jur. degree in 1857. He was hired in the Norwegian Ministry of Justice and the Police in 1860, and in 1870 he went on to become district stipendiary magistrate in Varanger. From 1874 to 1882 he served as County Governor of Finnmarkens Amt. While stationed here he was elected twice to the Norwegian Parliament from the constituency Hammerfest, Vardø og Vadsø. He left Parliament in 1885 during a very critical time for the Conservative Party.

In 1882 he became district stipendiary magistrate in Eker, Modum og Sigdal, and in 1889 he became presiding judge in Eidsivating Court of Appeal. In 1891 he was named acting Director of Public Prosecutions. He got the position on a permanent basis in 1901. He held this post until he died in November 1904, on the way to his office.

Government offices
Preceded by Jens Holmboe	County Governor of Finnmarkens amt 1874–1882	Succeeded by Carl Ingwart Theodor Rynning
Legal offices
Preceded by Bernhard Getz	Norwegian Director of Public Prosecutions; 1891–1904 (acting 1891-1901)	Succeeded by Harald Smedal
