= Eiler Hagerup (politician) =

Norwegian lawyer and government official

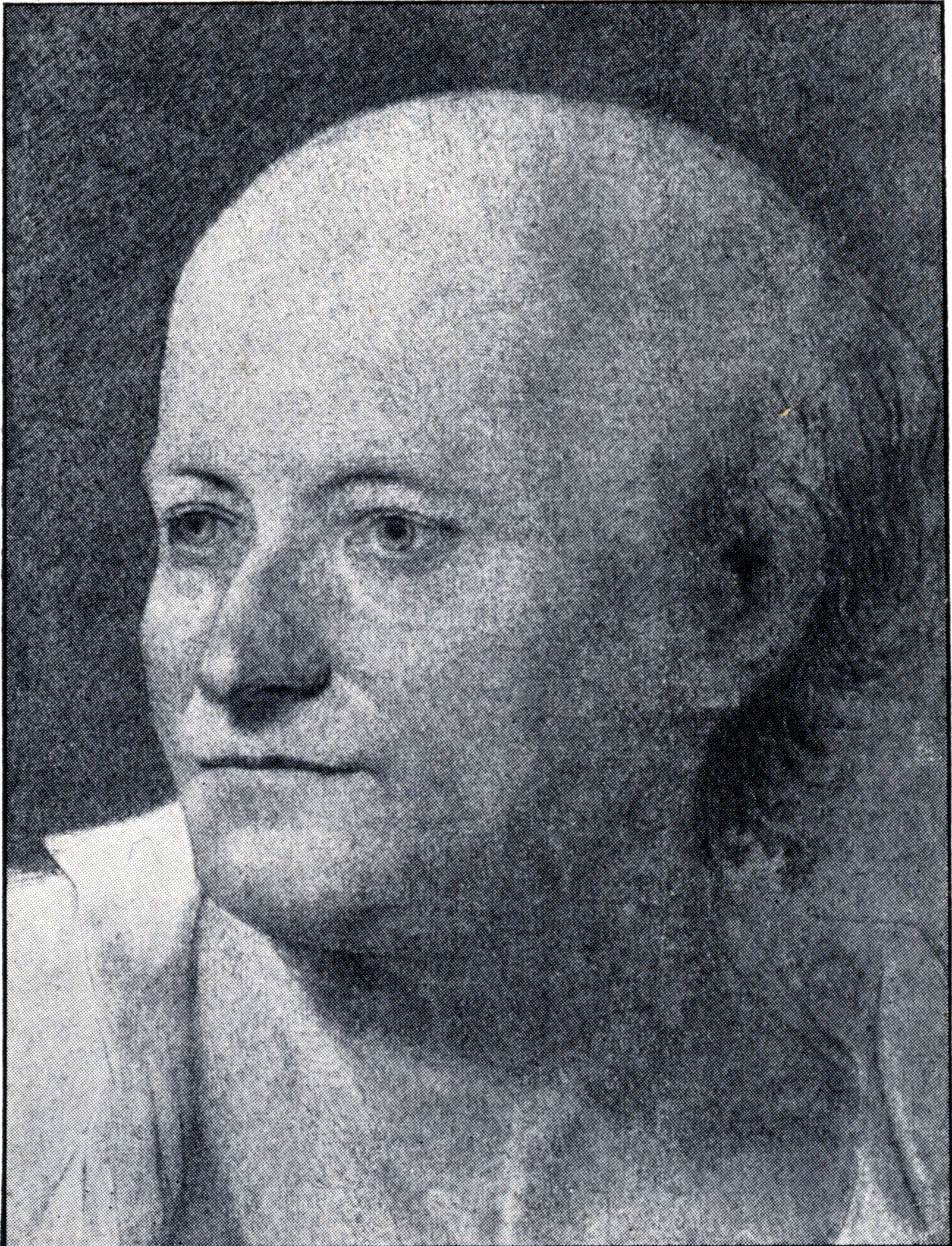

Governor of Finnmarkens amt
- In office 1768–1771
- Preceded by: Gunder Gundersen Hammer
- Succeeded by: Thorkild Fjeldsted

Personal details
- Born: 26 November 1736 Trondhjem, Norway
- Died: 9 May 1795 (aged 58) Horsens, Denmark
- Citizenship: Denmark-Norway
- Profession: Politician

Eiler Hagerup (1736–1795) was a Norwegian lawyer and government official. He lived in Denmark-Norway. He was the son of Eiler Hansen Hagerup. He served as the County Governor of Finnmark county from 1768 until 1771. After this, he had a job in Copenhagen in Denmark at the Finance College, an administrative agency that oversaw the financial management of the Kingdoms of Denmark-Norway.

Government offices
| Preceded by Gunder Gundersen Hammer | County Governor of Finnmarkens amt 1768–1771 | Succeeded by Thorkild Fjeldsted |
