= List of county governors of Finnmark =

The county governor of Finnmark county in Norway represented the central government administration in the county. The office of county governor is a government agency of the Kingdom of Norway; the title was Amtmann (before 1919) and then Fylkesmann (after 1919).

In 1576, the king of Norway established Vardøhus len as a new administrative unit for the northern part of the kingdom. In 1661, it became Vardøhus amt that was subordinate to the Trondhjem stiftamt and the king began appointing a county governor. In 1787, the island of Senja and the Troms area were transferred from Nordlandenes amt to Vardøhus amt and the new, larger county was renamed Finmarkens amt. In 1866, the island of Senja and the Troms area were separated from Vardøhus to form the new Tromsø amt. In 1919, the name was again changed to Finnmark fylke. In 2002, the Sami language name, Finnmárku, was added as a co-official name for the county. From 1 January 2019 the county governor offices of Troms and Finnmark were merged in anticipation of the merger of the two counties.

From 1844 until 1918, the county was subordinate to the Diocesan Governor of Tromsø who was the civil governor of the Diocese of Tromsø.

The county governor is the government's representative in the county. The governor carries out the resolutions and guidelines of the Storting and government. This is done first by the county governor performing administrative tasks on behalf of the ministries. Secondly, the county governor also monitors the activities of the municipalities and is the appeal body for many types of municipal decisions.

== Names ==
The name of the county (Vardøhus, Finmarken, Finnmark) and the word for county (amt, fylke) have changed over the centuries. From 1661 until 1787 the title was Amtmann i Vardøhus amt. From 1787 until 1918, it was Amtmann i Finmarkens amt. Since 1918, the title was Fylkesmann i Finnmark fylke.

== List of county governors ==
Finnmark county has had the following governors:

County governors of Finnmark
Start	End	Name
1661	1666	Christoffer Orning (1617–1676)
1666	1667	Frederik Schort (1614–1674)
1668	1680	Otte Hansen Bjelke
1680	1682	Knud Gjedde (c. 1635-1707); Served concurrently as the Amtmann for Nordlandenes amt.
1682	1684	The magistrates (city council) of Bergen supervised this county.
1684	1701	Hans Hansen Lilienskiold (c. 1650–1703)
1701	1717	Erik Matssøn Lorch (1647–1717)
1717	1718	Jacob Møinichen (1680–1718)
1718	1720	Nikolai Friese (16??–1721)
1720	1729	Peter Siedelmann (16??–1729)
1730	1738	Henrik Friman (1678–1738)
1739	1750	Rasmus Kjeldsøn (1701–1753)
1750	1750	Peter Schnitler (1690–1751) (Appointed, but never took office.)
1750	1757	Mathias Collett (1708–1759)
1757	1768	Gunder Gundersen Hammer (1725–1772)
1768	1771	Eiler Hagerup (1736–1795)
1771	1778	Thorkild Fjeldsted (1740–1796)
1778	1787	Christen Heiberg (1737–1801)
1787	1800	Ole Hannibal Sommerfeldt (1753–1821)
1800	1806	Martin Andreas Unmack (1754–1806)
1806	1811	Hilmar Meincke Krohg (1776–1851)
1811	1814	Fredrik Wilhelm Wedel-Jarlsberg (1787–1863)
1814	1828	Johan Caspar Krogh (1776–1831)
1828	1829	Christian Ulrik Kastrup (1784–1850)
1829	1833	Ulrik Frederik Cappelen (1797–1864)
1833	1843	Ole Edvard Buck (1799–1843)
Aug; 1839	Mar; 1845	Mons Lie (1803–1881) (Acting governor for Buck, then Harris.)
1844	1853	Anton Theodor Harris (1804–1866); Served concurrently as Stiftamtmann for Tromsø stiftamt. Served concurrently as Amtmann for Tromsø amt.
1854	1857	Carl Frederik Motzfeldt (1808–1902); Served concurrently as Stiftamtmann for Tromsø stiftamt. Served concurrently as Amtmann for Tromsø amt.
1858	1866	Mathias Bonsach Krogh Nannestad (1815–1878); Served concurrently as Stiftamtmann for Tromsø stiftamt. Served concurrently as Amtmann for Tromsø amt.
1866	1874	Jens Holmboe (1821–1891)
1874	1882	Johan Blackstad (1832–1904)
1882	1885	Carl Ingwart Theodor Rynning (1837–1892)
1886	1889	Karl Adolf Langberg (1850–1889)
1889	1894	Nikolai Christian Grove Prebensen (1850–1938)
1896	1906	Truls Johannessen Wiel Graff (1851–1918)
1906	1912	Andreas Tostrup Urbye (1869–1955)
1912	1921	Johan Albrigt Rivertz (1874–1942)
1922	1928	Hagbarth Lund (1877–1963)
1928	1948	Hans Gabrielsen (1891–1965) (Imprisoned by WWII Occupied government from 1941–1945.)
1941	1944	Thor Bekeng (1905–19??) (WWII Occupied government)
Nov; 1944	Sep; 1945	Peder Holt (1899–1963) (Acting governor for Gabrielsen.)
Sep; 1945	Nov; 1945	Erling Johannes Norvik (1899–1964) (Acting governor for Gabrielsen.)
1948	1963	Peder Holt (1899–1963)
1951	1955	Dag Tønder (1907–1989) (Acting governor for Holt.)
1963	1974	Kolbjørn Varmann (1904–1980)
Mar; 1963	July; 1965	Anders John Aune (1923–2011) (Acting governor for Varmann.)
1974	1989	Anders John Aune (1923–2011)
Jan; 1990	May; 1990	Kurt Mosbakk (born 1934) (Acting governor)
Mar; 1990	Mar; 1998	Svein Alsaker (born 1940)
Aug; 1990	July; 1993	Ingrid Røstad Fløtten (born 1954) (Acting governor for Alsaker.)
1998	2016	Gunnar Kjønnøy (born 1947)
2016	Oct; 2018	Ingvild Aleksandersen (born 1968)
Oct; 2018	Dec; 2018	Stian Lindgård (born 1968) (Acting governor)
Office abolished on 1 January 2019, see List of county governors of Troms and Finnmark
