= Ole Edvard Buck =

Norwegian politician

Ole Edvard Buck (14 November 1799 – 13 June 1843) was a Norwegian politician.

He was appointed County Governor of Finmarkens Amt (today's Troms and Finnmark) in 1833. In 1838 he was elected to the Norwegian Parliament in 1838, representing his county. He served only one term.

After his parliamentary term he was sent to Northwest Russia by the government (Wedel-Jarlsberg's Second Ministerium), in order to improve commercial relations. During this period Mons Lie was acting County Governor. Buck died in 1843.

Government offices
Preceded by Ulrik Fredrik Cappelen	County Governor of Finnmarkens amt 1833–1843	Succeeded by Mons Lie (acting)
