= Svein Alsaker =

Norwegian politician (born 1940)

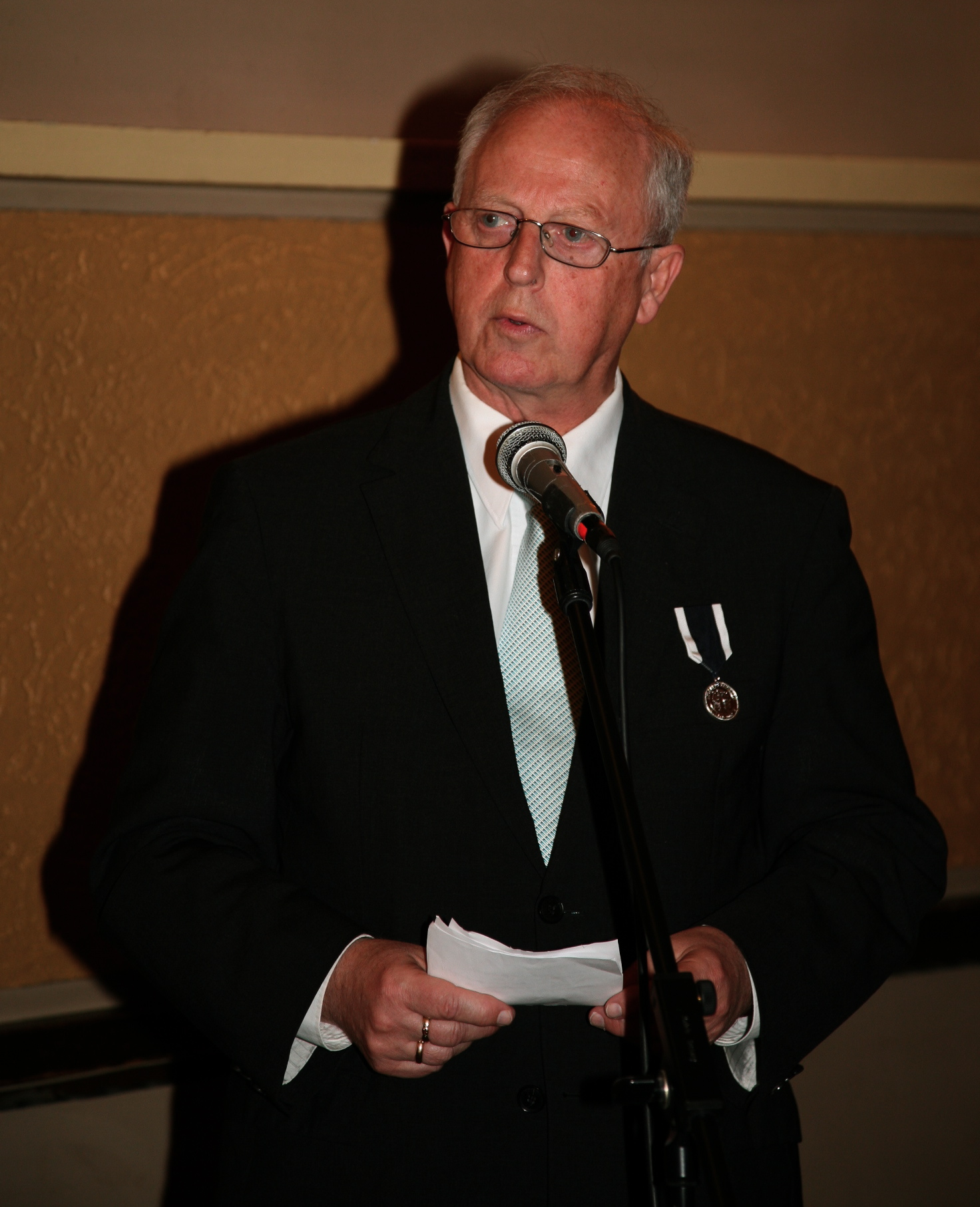

Member of the Norwegian Parliament for Hordaland (representative #5)
- In office 1985–1989
- Prime Minister: Kåre Willoch (1985-1986); Gro Harlem Brundtland (1986-1989)

Member of the Norwegian Parliament for Hordaland (representative #5)
- In office 1989–1993
- Prime Minister: Gro Harlem Brundtland

Governor of Finnmark
- In office 19 March 1990 – 19 March 1998
- Preceded by: Anders John Aune
- Succeeded by: Gunnar Kjønnøy

Governor of Hordaland
- In office 19 March 1998 – 1 June 2010
- Preceded by: Håkon Randal
- Succeeded by: Lars Sponheim

Personal details
- Born: 11 March 1940 (age 86) Bergen, Norway
- Citizenship: Norway
- Party: Christian Democratic Party
- Parent(s): Selmar Alsaker & Sigrid Doksæter
- Profession: Politician

Svein Alsaker (born 11 March 1940 in Bergen) is a Norwegian politician for the Christian Democratic Party. He was a member of the Norwegian Parliament from 1985 until 1993. He was also a County Governor for both Finnmark and Hordaland counties.

== Personal life ==
Svein Alsaker was born on 11 March 1940 in the city of Bergen, Norway to Selmar Alsaker and his wife Sigrid Doksæter.

In his younger days he was a triple jumper. He won the bronze medal at the Norwegian championships in 1961, representing Fana IL, in a lifetime best result of 14.97 metres (49.1 ft).

== Education and career ==
He started his political career as chairman of the Hammerfest local branch of the Young Conservatives from 1965 to 1966. Upon his return to Bergen, he became the deputy chair of the local Christian Democratic Party chapter from 1972 to 1974. From 1974 to 1978 and again from 1980 to 1983 he chaired the county party chapter in Hordaland; during these periods he also sat on the national board.

By profession Alsaker was a jurist, having graduated from the University of Oslo with the cand.jur. degree in 1964. He has worked as an attorney, lawyer, and judge. He was a member of the board of Norges Statsbaner from 1982 to 1986, the Norwegian State Agriculture Bank from 1994 to 2000, and Statskog SF from 1999 to 2005.

He was elected as a deputy representative in the Norwegian Parliament during the terms 1977–1981 and 1981–1985. This meant that he was a "backup" member who only served if needed. From 1983 to 1985 he was needed and he served as a regular representative while Asbjørn Haugstvedt was a member of the second cabinet Willoch. In the election of 1985, he was elected as a representative for Hordaland county. He was re-elected in 1989.

Alsaker was also a member of the county council for the Hordaland County Municipality from 1983 to 1987. He was later appointed to the post of County Governor of Finnmark in 1990, but because he was serving in the Parliament at that time, he did not begin serving until 1993 and two other people filled in as acting county governor. In 1998, he was appointed to be the County Governor of Hordaland. He held that post until his retirement in 2010.

Government offices
Preceded by Anders John Aune	County Governor of Finnmark; 1990–1998; He was on leave from twice at the beginning of his term. He was replaced by Kurt Mosbakk (1990) and Ingrid Røstad Fløtten (1990-1993).	Succeeded by Gunnar Kjønnøy
Preceded by Håkon Randal	County Governor of Hordaland; 1998–2010	Succeeded by Lars Sponheim
