= Bård Magne Pedersen =

Norwegian civil servant and politician

Acting Governor of Troms
- In office 2014–2017
- Preceded by: Svein Ludvigsen
- Succeeded by: Elisabeth Aspaker

Acting governor of Troms
- In office 2005–2006
- Preceded by: Vilgunn Gregusson
- Succeeded by: Svein Ludvigsen

Personal details
- Born: 1958 (age 67–68) Norway
- Citizenship: Norway
- Profession: Politician

Bård Magne Pedersen (born 1958) is a Norwegian civil servant and politician. He served as the acting county governor of Troms county twice. The first time was from 2005 to 2006 after Vilgunn Gregusson retired, holding the office for when Svein Ludvigsen could take over when he finished his duties as cabinet minister. The second time was from 2014 until 2017, holding the office for when Elisabeth Aspaker could take over when she finished her duties as cabinet minister.

Government offices
Preceded by Vilgunn Gregusson	Acting County Governor of Troms; 2005–2006 (acting for Svein Ludvigsen)	Succeeded by Svein Ludvigsen
Preceded by Svein Ludvigsen	Acting County Governor of Troms; 2014–2017 (acting for Elisabeth Aspaker)	Succeeded by Elisabeth Aspaker
