= Gunnar Kjønnøy =

Norwegian economist and civil servant

Gunnar Peder Kjønnøy

Governor of Finnmark
- In office December 1998 – 1 October 2016
- Preceded by: Svein Alsaker
- Succeeded by: Ingvild Aleksandersen

Personal details
- Born: 1 June 1947 (age 78) Averøya, Norway
- Citizenship: Norway
- Education: Cand.oecon. (1972)
- Alma mater: University of Oslo
- Profession: Economist

Gunnar Peder Kjønnøy (born 1947) is a Norwegian economist and civil servant. He served as the County Governor of Finnmark county from 1998 until his retirement in 2016.

== Personal life ==
Kjønnøy was born on 1 June 1947 on the island of Averøya in Møre og Romsdal county, Norway.

== Education and career ==
Kjønnøy graduated from the University of Oslo in 1972 with a cand.oecon. degree. He was employed by the Ministry of Local Government and Regional Development, the Regional Development Fund, and the Ministry of Finance.

In 1980, was hired by the Norwegian Ministry of Fisheries. During his time there he led the annual negotiations with the Soviet Union (and later Russia) on the resource management in the Barents Sea. In December 1998, he was appointed as the County Governor of Finnmark county. He held that position until 1 October 2016 when he retired.

Government offices
Preceded by Svein Alsaker	County Governor of Finnmark; 1998–2016	Succeeded by Ingvild Aleksandersen
