= Ingvild Aleksandersen =

Norwegian lawyer

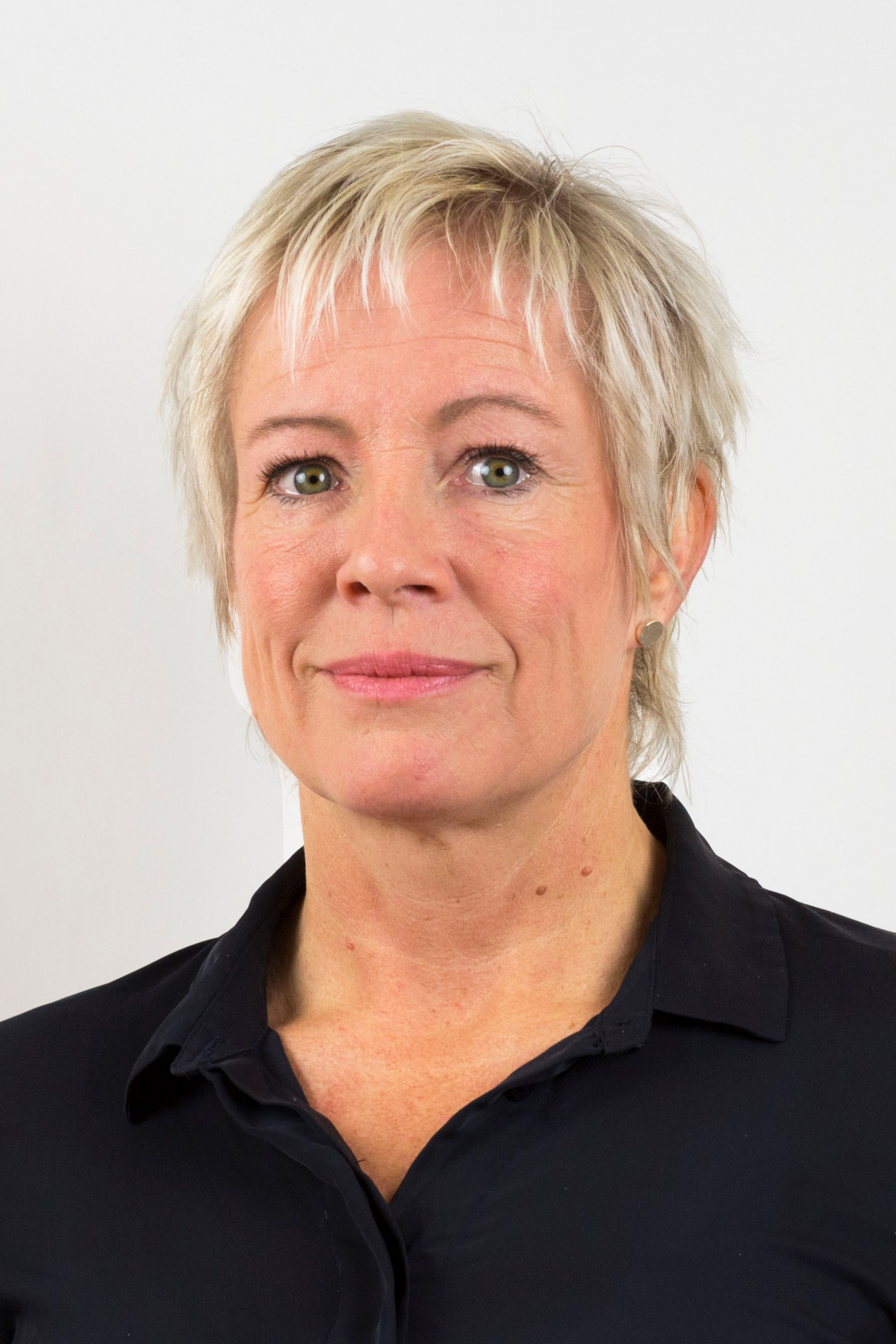

Acting County Governor of Østfold, Buskerud, Oslo and Akershus
- Incumbent
- Assumed office 1 January 2025
- Preceded by: Valgerd Svarstad Haugland

Governor of Finnmark
- In office 1 October 2016 – 15 October 2018
- Preceded by: Gunnar Kjønnøy
- Succeeded by: Stian Lindgård (acting)

Assistant Governor of Finnmark
- In office 2013–2016
- Governor: Gunnar Kjønnøy

Personal details
- Born: 1968 (age 57–58) Vadsø, Norway
- Citizenship: Norway
- Education: Cand.jur. (1995)
- Alma mater: University of Oslo
- Profession: Lawyer

Ingvild Aleksandersen (born 1968) is a Norwegian lawyer who served as county governor of Finnmark from 2016 to 2018. As of 1 January 2024, she serves as the acting county governor of Østfold, Buskerud, Oslo and Akershus.

== Personal life ==
Aleksandersen was born in 1968 in Vadsø, the administrative centre of Finnmark, the country's northernmost county.

== Education and career ==
Aleksandersen graduated from the University of Oslo in 1995 with a cand.jur. degree. She then worked as a lawyer in private practice, for the Finnmark Estate, and for the Finnmark County Municipality. From 2013-2016, she was the assistant county governor of Finnmark under Gov. Gunnar Kjønnøy. On 1 October 2016, she was appointed as County Governor of Finnmark county. This job was temporary because the Government of Norway was re-evaluating the counties in Norway and the future of Finnmark as a separate county after 2019 was uncertain. Aleksandersen held the post until 2018, after which the Governor positions of Troms and Finnmark were merged from 2019.

Government offices
| Preceded by Gunnar Kjønnøy | County Governor of Finnmark; 2016–2018 | Succeeded by Position abolished |
