= Boye Strøm =

Norwegian statistician and civil servant (1847–1930)

Boye Christian Riis Strøm (18 June 1847 – 1930) was a Norwegian statistician and civil servant.

He was born in Grue Municipality in Solør, and graduated with the cand.jur. degree in 1870. He was the director of Statistics Norway from 1882 to 1886, and published the yearbook Statistisk aarbog for Kongeriget Norge. From 1889 to 1915 he served as the Diocesan Governor of Tromsø stiftamt and the County Governor of Tromsø amt.

Government offices
| Preceded by Christian Collett Kjerschow | Diocesan Governor of Tromsø stiftamt 1889–1915 | Succeeded by Klaus Hoel |
| Preceded by Christian Collett Kjerschow | County Governor of Tromsø amt 1889–1915 | Succeeded by Klaus Hoel |
