= Martin Buvik =

Norwegian politician (1923–2018)

Martin Johannes Toralf Buvik

Governor of Troms
- In office 1977–1990
- Preceded by: Kristian Even Haug
- Succeeded by: Leif Arne Heløe

Personal details
- Born: 14 January 1923 Skånland, Norway
- Died: 17 February 2018 (aged 95) Tromsø, Norway
- Citizenship: Norway
- Profession: Politician

Martin Johannes Toralf Buvik (14 January 1923–17 February 2018) was a Norwegian politician for the Conservative Party.

Buvik was a teacher in Skånland Municipality and Evenes Municipality from 1942 until 1947. After this, he worked for the Conservative Party in Troms county. Later, he was a member of the municipal council for Tromsøysund Municipality from 1955 to 1963. He was elected to the Norwegian Parliament, representing Troms county in 1965, and was re-elected on two occasions, serving from 1965 until 1977. In 1977, he was appointed to be the County Governor of Troms county, a position he held until 1990. He was also the chairman of the Norwegian Petroleum Directorate from 1977 until 1989.

Government offices
| Preceded by Kristian Even Haug | County Governor of Troms; 1977–1991 | Succeeded by Leif Arne Heløe |
