= List of county governors of Troms =

This is a list of the county governors of Troms county in Norway. The office of county governor is a government agency of the Kingdom of Norway. The title was Amtmann (before 1919) and then Fylkesmann (after 1919).

In 1844, the Troms area were separated from Vardøhus amt to form the new Tromsø amt (county). For the first 22 years, the Tromsø and Vardøhus counties shared an amtmann. It wasn't until 1866 that Tromsø got its own county governor. In 1919, the name was changed to Troms fylke. On 1 July 2006, the Northern Sami language name for the county was granted co-official (parallel) status along with Troms, so the names became Troms fylke (Norwegian) or Romssa fylka (Northern Sami). From 1 January 2019 the county governor offices of Troms and Finnmark were merged in anticipation of the merger of the two counties.

From 1844 until 1918, the county was subordinate to the Diocesan Governor of Tromsø who was the civil governor of the Diocese of Tromsø.

The county governor is the government's representative in the county. The governor carries out the resolutions and guidelines of the Storting and government. This is done first by the county governor performing administrative tasks on behalf of the ministries. Secondly, the county governor also monitors the activities of the municipalities and is the appeal body for many types of municipal decisions.

== Names ==
The name of the county (Tromsø or Troms) and the word for county (amt or fylke) have changed over time.

- From 1844 until 1918, the title was Amtmann i Tromsø amt.
- From 1 Jan 1919 until 1 January 2019, the title was Fylkesmann i Troms fylke.

== List of county governors ==
Troms county has had the following governors:

County governors of Troms
Start	End	Name
1844	1853	Anton Theodor Harris (1804–1866); Served concurrently as Stiftamtmann for Tromsø stiftamt. Served concurrently as Amtmann for Finnmarks amt.
1854	1857	Carl Frederik Motzfeldt (1808–1902); Served concurrently as Stiftamtmann for Tromsø stiftamt. Served concurrently as Amtmann for Finnmarks amt.
1858	1869	Mathias Bonsach Krogh Nannestad (1815–1878); Served concurrently as Stiftamtmann for Tromsø stiftamt. Served concurrently as Amtmann for Finnmarks amt (1858-1866).
1869	1889	Christian Collett Kjerschow (1821–1889); Served concurrently as Stiftamtmann for Tromsø stiftamt.
1889	1914	Boye Christian Riis Strøm (1847–1930); Served concurrently as Stiftamtmann for Tromsø stiftamt.
1915	1920	Klaus Nord Hoel (1865–1923); Served concurrently as Stiftamtmann for Tromsø stiftamt (1915-1918).
1921	1928	Otto Backe (1874–1928)
1928	1938	Johannes Gerckens Bassøe (1878–1962)
1939	1940	Gunnar Bjørn Nordbye (1897–1940)
1940	1941	Hans Gabrielsen (1891–1965) (Acting governor)
1941	1946	Hans Ougen Skotner (1903–1987) (Acting governor)
1941	1945	Marcus Bull (1895–1974) (WWII Occupied government)
1946	1953	Arne Aas (1890–1953)
1953	1977	Kristian Even Haug (1906–2000)
1977	1991	Martin Buvik (1923–2018)
1991	2000	Leif Arne Heløe (born 1932)
2000	2002	Vilgunn Gregusson (born 1936) (Acting governor)
2002	2014	Svein Ludvigsen (born 1946)
2002	2006	Vilgunn Gregusson (born 1936) (Acting governor for Ludvigsen)
2014	2017	Bård Magne Pedersen (born 1958) (Acting governor for Aspaker)
2014	2018	Elisabeth Aspaker (born 1962)
Office abolished on 1 January 2019, see List of county governors of Troms and Finnmark
