= Nikolai Prebensen =

Norwegian politician

Nikolai Christian Grove Prebensen (13 April 1850 – 24 May 1938) was a Norwegian politician for the Conservative Party.

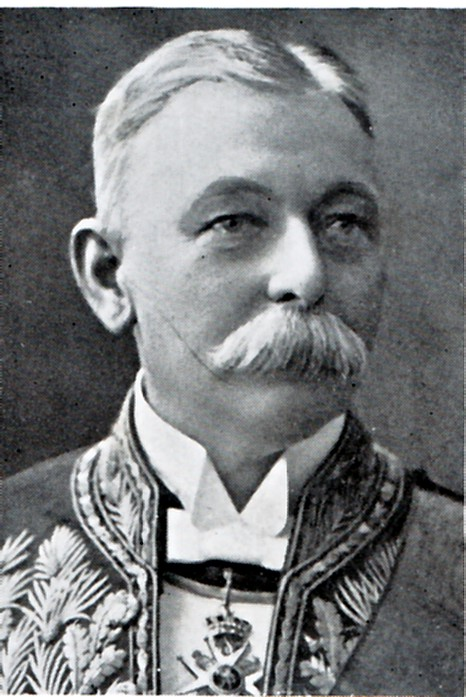
Portrait of Nikolai Prebensen

He was born in the town of Risør as a son of Jacob Wetlesen Prebensen (1808–1892) and Wencke Kristiane Grove. He finished his secondary education in 1868 and took the cand.jur. degree in 1873. He was hired as a clerk in the Ministry of Church Affairs in 1876, and from 1878 to 1881 he was a deputy judge in Romsdal District Court. He was also acting district stipendiary magistrate for some time in the absence of district stipendiary magistrate Roll. From 1881 to 1887 he was a clerk in the Ministry of Justice and the Police, before being hired as chief of police in Vardø in 1887.

From 1889 to 1894 he served as the County Governor of Finnmark. He was the mayor of Vadsø Municipality from 1892 to 1894, and also sat one period in the Parliament of Norway, from 1892 to 1894 for the constituency Hammerfest, Vardø og Vadsø. He was a member of the Standing Committee on the Military. From 1896 to 1906 he served as the County Governor of Aust-Agder. He represented the constituency Arendal og Grimstad in the Parliament of Norway from 1903 to 1906. In Arendal, he gained much support for wanting to locate Arendal Station at Kittelsbukt rather than at Barbu.

In his second parliamentary term, he chaired the Protocol Committee. In 1905, he chaired the "Special Committee" that prepared the establishment of a Norwegian consulate service, and thus the dissolution of the union between Norway and Sweden. When the union was dissolved and Norway could appoint its own diplomats, Prebensen became the ambassador ("minister") to the Russian Empire in 1906. He remained so until after the Russian October Revolution, when diplomatic ties to Russia were severed.

Government offices
Preceded by Karl Adolf Langberg	County Governor of Finnmarkens amt 1889–1894	Succeeded by Truls Johannessen Wiel Graff
Preceded by Niels Cornelius Bonnevie	County Governor of Nedenæs amt 1896–1906	Succeeded by Sigurd Lambrechts
