= Johan Aas =

Norwegian politician (born 1960)

Johan Aas (born 5 March 1960) is a Norwegian politician for the Progress Party.

He was elected as deputy representative to the Parliament of Norway from Hedmark for the term 2017–2021. He hails from Kongsvinger and has been a member of the Progress Party national board.
