= Henrik Lachmann =

Norwegian civil servant and politician

County Governor of Stavanger amt
- In office 1762–1768

County Governor of Smaalenenes amt
- In office 1768–1781

Personal details
- Born: 1718 Norway
- Died: 1797 (aged 78–79) Norway
- Citizenship: Norway
- Profession: Politician

Henrik Lachmann (1738–1797) was a Norwegian civil servant and politician. He served as the County Governor of Stavanger county from 1762 until 1768. He then served as the County Governor of Smaalenenes amt from 1768 until 1781.

Government offices
Preceded by Henrik Wilhelm Tillisch	County Governor of Stavanger amt 1762–1768	Succeeded by Gunder Hammer
Preceded by Baltzer Sechmann Fleischer	County Governor of Smaalenenes amt 1768–1781	Succeeded by Frederik Hauch
