= Jonas Aas =

Norwegian footballer (1890–1971)

Personal information
- Date of birth: 28 September 1890
- Date of death: 9 February 1971 (aged 80)
- Position: Forward

International career
Years	Team	Apps	(Gls)
1913–1915	Norway	3	(0)

Jonas Aas (28 September 1890 – 9 February 1971) was a Norwegian footballer. He played in three matches for the Norway national football team from 1913 to 1915.
