= Gunder Aas =

Norwegian politician (1785–1853)

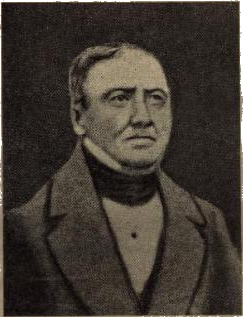

Governor of Stavanger Amt
- In office 1833–1853
- Preceded by: Christian Ulrik Kastrup
- Succeeded by: Anton Theodor Harris

Personal details
- Born: 13 May 1785 Melhus, Norway
- Died: 5 May 1853 (aged 67) Stavanger, Norway
- Citizenship: Norway
- Profession: Politician

Gunder Aas (13 May 1785 – 5 May 1853) was a Norwegian civil servant and politician. He served as the County Governor of Stavanger county from 1833 until 1853.

Gunder Aas was the son of a farmer from the village of Øyås in Melhus. He took the Norwegian legal exam in 1812. In July 1814 was appointed town bailiff in Vardø as well as the garrison auditor and a manager at Vardøhus fortress. He resigned from these positions with in 1817 and in 1817 became a procurator for upper and lower courts. In 1821, he was appointed as a judge in Vestre Råbyggelaget. In 1829, he became a judge in Jæren and Dalane. In 1833 he was appointed to be the Governor in Stavanger Amt.

Aas represented Stavanger County in the Storting from 1833 to 1835. From 1836 to 1840 and 1843–1846, he was chairman of Stavanger County's agricultural holding company. In 1843, he was appointed a Knight of the Order of the North Star.

He was married to Anne Margrethe Lund, daughter of a businessman from Farsund.

Government offices
Preceded by Christian Ulrik Kastrup	County Governor of Stavanger Amt; 1833–1853	Succeeded by Anton Theodor Harris
