= Leif Arne Heløe =

Norwegian politician (born 1932)

Governor of Troms
- In office 1991–2000
- Monarchs: Olav V Harald V
- Prime Minister: Gro Harlem Brundtland; Thorbjørn Jagland; Kjell Magne Bondevik
- Preceded by: Martin Buvik
- Succeeded by: Vilgunn Gregusson

Minister of Social Affairs
- In office 14 October 1981 – 9 May 1986
- Prime Minister: Kåre Willoch
- Preceded by: Arne Nilsen
- Succeeded by: Tove Strand

Personal details
- Born: 8 August 1932 (age 93) Harstad, Troms, Norway
- Party: Conservative
- Spouse: Berit Ellingsen (m. 1958)
- Profession: Politician

Leif Arne Heløe (born 8 August 1932) is a Norwegian politician for the Conservative Party. He was the Norwegian Minister of Social Affairs from 1981-1986. He also served as the County Governor of Troms county from 1991 until 2000.

Heløe was born in Harstad in Troms county, and he was a dentist before launching his political career.

Government offices
Preceded by Arne Nilsen	Norwegian Minister of Social Affairs; 1981–1986	Succeeded by Tove Strand
Preceded by Martin Buvik	County Governor of Troms; 1991–2000	Succeeded by Vilgunn Gregusson
