= Ingrid Røstad Fløtten =

Norwegian judge

Acting Governor of Finnmark
- In office 31 August 1990 – 31 July 1993
- Preceded by: Kurt Mosbakk (acting)
- Succeeded by: Svein Alsaker

Personal details
- Born: 18 June 1954 (age 71) Norway
- Citizenship: Norway
- Profession: Judge

Ingrid Røstad Fløtten (born 1954) is a Norwegian judge and politician. She served as the acting County Governor of Finnmark county from 31 August 1990 until 31 July 1993.

Ingrid Røstad Fløtten was born on 18 June 1954 in Norway.

Fløtten was a judge for the court in Vardø Municipality for many years. Prior to 31 December 2004, she was the chairwoman for SEFO in Troms and Finnmark counties. SEFO was the predecessor to the present-day Norwegian Bureau for the Investigation of Police Affairs.

In 2011, she was named the leader of the committee that was to review the weapons laws in Norway in response to the 2011 Norway attacks.

Government offices
Preceded by Kurt Mosbakk (acting for Svein Alsaker)	Acting County Governor of Finnmark; 31 August 1990–31 July 1993 (acting for Svein Alsaker)	Succeeded by Svein Alsaker
