= Kristine Aas =

Norwegian writer, poet, cartographer and painter

Kristine Stine Grøn Aas (née Colban; 1 March 1793, in Bø – 16 April 1863, in Oslo) was a Norwegian writer, poet, amateur painter, and cartographer. She is considered the first known Norwegian female cartographer, having drawn the map of Lofoten and Vesterålen that accompanied her father's 1814 geographical description of the region. She was also the first amateur painter known from northern Norway, and her 1832 song in the northern Norwegian dialect was the first printed song of its kind.

== Life and work ==
=== Family and early life ===
Aas was the daughter of Erik Andreas Colban (1760–1828), a parish priest, and Karen Angell (d. 1853). She was born in Bø in Vesterålen, where her father served as priest. The family moved to Vågan in Lofoten when she was eight years old.

In 1817 she married the district judge, council secretary and member of parliament Johannes Henriksen Aas (1770–1822), and the couple settled at Storsteinnes in Troms. Their daughter Karen Magdalena Aas (1820–1900) married the educationalist Hartvig Nissen. After being widowed, Aas settled in Trondheim.

=== Cartography ===
In 1814 her father published Forsøg til en Beskrivelse over Lofodens og Vesteraalens Fogderie i Nordlands Amt: med et Situations-Cart. Aas, then 23 years old, drew the map of Lofoten and Vesterålen that accompanied her father's work. In doing so she became the first Norwegian female cartographer known to history, and her map is among the oldest surviving printed maps of the region. She later also drew perspective maps of Finnesset, Kabelvåg and Kjerkvågen.

=== Painting ===
Aas is regarded as northern Norway's first amateur painter. In 1814 she made a pair of watercolours of Vågan, and in the 1820s she painted a prospect of Tromsø. Two of her prospects are held in the collections of the Tromsø University Museum.

=== Writing ===
In 1829 Aas published anonymously the memoir Erindringer om Provst Erik Andreas Colban. She wrote the text of the song "En sang om den nordlandske bondestand", also known as "Nordlands-sang", which in 1832 became the first printed song in the northern Norwegian dialect. In 1843 she wrote a poem inspired by the legend of Vågakallen; the poem was printed in full and celebrated in the newspaper Nordlys. After her death, a collection of verse titled Nogle Digte was published posthumously. She also wrote twelve children's songs for Asylvennen in 1843, as well as short articles for Asyl- og Skoletidende.

=== Social work ===
After being widowed, Aas settled in Trondheim, where in 1837 she was a co-founder of Børneasylet, Norway's first child asylum. She later moved to Christiania, where in 1839 she helped found Grønlands asyl. She was deeply engaged in the ladies' committee that oversaw the daily running of the child asylum, taking responsibility for a range of administrative tasks and referring to herself as "Administratorinde". Henrik Wergeland wrote "Asylbørnenes Sang" for her 48th birthday.

== Works ==
- 1829: Erindringer om Provst Erik Andreas Colban (published anonymously), Trondheim
- 1864: Nogle Digte, af Stine Aas, Christiania
