= Sigrid Aas =

Norwegian cross-country skier (born 1980)

Personal information
- Born: 1980 (age 45–46) Norway

Sport
- Sport: Skiing
- Club: Strindheim IL

World Cup career
- Seasons: 2004–2009
- Indiv. podiums: 0
- Team wins: 0
- Overall titles: 0

Sigrid Aas (born 1980) is a Norwegian retired cross-country skier.

Aas made her World Cup debut in February 2004, finishing 33rd in a Stockholm sprint. Specializing as a sprinter, she collected her first World Cup points the following week when finishing 28th in Drammen. She improved to a 21st place in February 2005 in Reit im Winkl, 18th place in March 2007 in Lahti and 13th place in March 2007 in Drammen. She also competed in a few relays. Her last World Cup outing was a 21st place in March 2009 in Trondheim.

Aas represented the sports clubs Strindheim IL.
