= Nils Olaf Hovdenak =

Norwegian politician

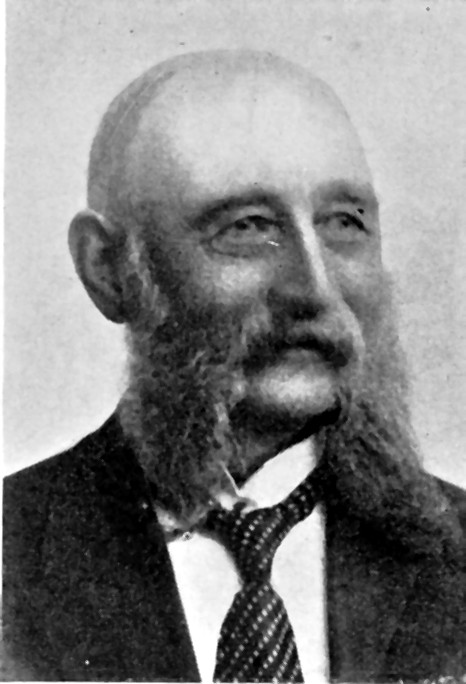
Nils Olaf Hovdenak

Nils Olaf Hovdenak (8 January 1854 – 21 July 1942) was a Norwegian politician for the Conservative Party. He was Minister of Labour 1912–1913. Hovdenak was an engineer by profession.
