= Apalapsili Airport =

Airport in Indonesia

- IATA: AAS; ICAO: WAVR

Summary
- Location: Apalapsili, Yalimo Regency, Highland Papua, Indonesia
- Elevation AMSL: 3,000 ft (910 m)
- Coordinates: 03°53′05″S 139°18′38″E

Map
- Location in Western New Guinea Location in Indonesia

Runways
Direction	Length		Surface
Direction	ft	m	Surface
	2,953	900

Apalapsili Airport (IATA: AAS, ICAO: WAVR) is an airport in Apalapsili, Yalimo Regency, Highland Papua, Indonesia.
