= Gunnar Bjørn Nordbye =

Norwegian lawyer and politician

Gunnar Bjørn Reichenwald Norbye
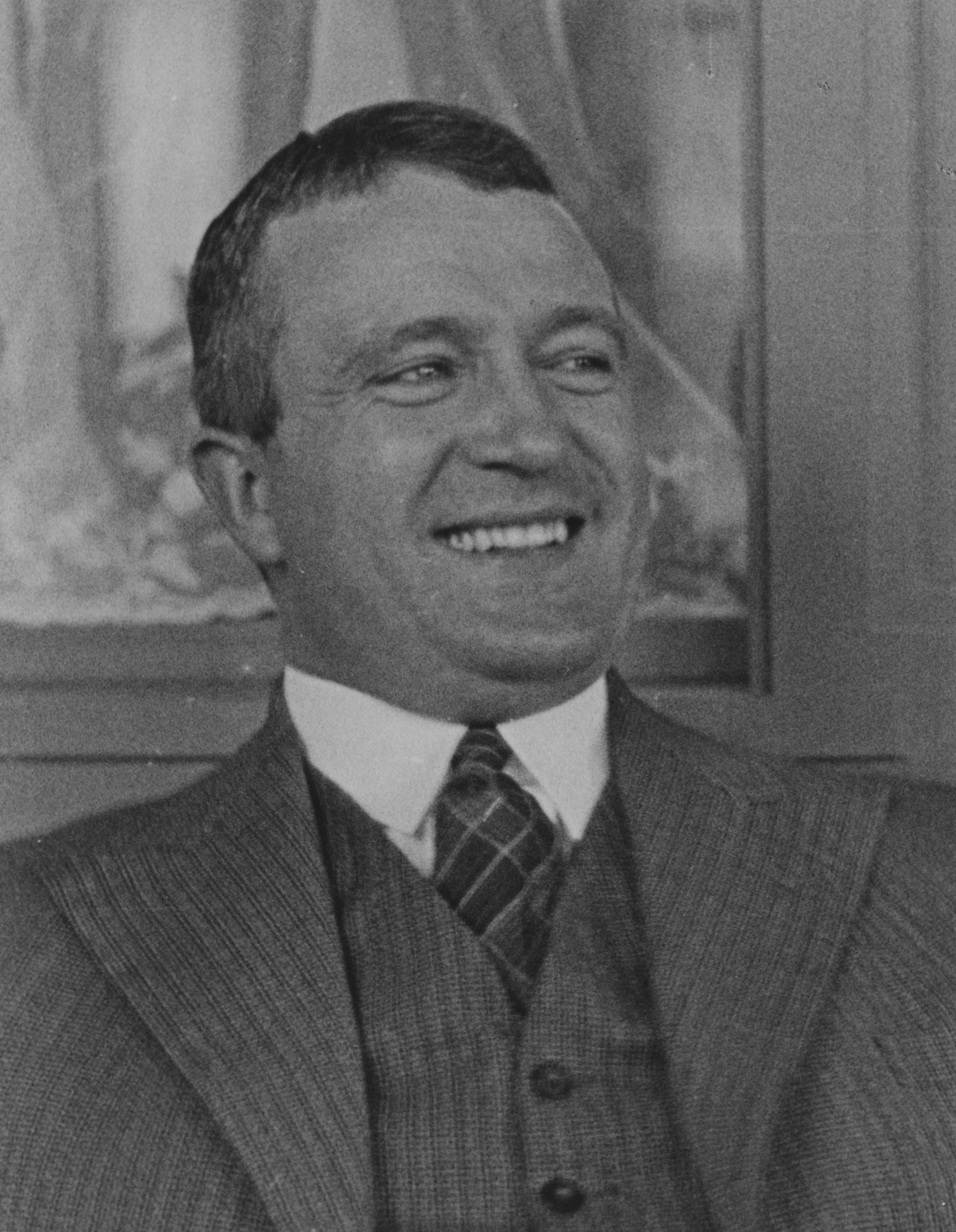
- Gunnar Bjørn Reichenwald Norbye (1897-1940), Norwegian officer and politician.

Governor of Troms
- In office 1938–1940
- Preceded by: Johannes Gerckens Bassøe
- Succeeded by: Hans Gabrielsen

Personal details
- Born: 28 January 1897 Halden, Norway
- Died: 6 May 1940 (aged 43) Tromsø, Norway
- Citizenship: Norway
- Profession: Politician

Gunnar Bjørn Reichenwald Norbye, often misspelled spelled Nordbye, (1897–1940) was a Norwegian lawyer and politician. He served as the County Governor of Troms county from 1938 until his unexpected death in 1940. He had been on board the ship DS Richard With which was attacked in May 1940 and the ship was evacuated and the passengers safely landed on shore. Shortly afterwards, Norbye got sick and died.

Government offices
Preceded by Johannes Gerckens Bassøe	County Governor of Troms; 1938–1940	Succeeded by Hans Gabrielsen
