= Arne Aas (politician) =

Norwegian civil servant and politician (1890–1953)

Arne Gunerius Aas

Governor of Troms
- In office 1946–1953
- Preceded by: Hans Skotner
- Succeeded by: Kristian Even Haug

Personal details
- Born: 26 September 1890 Trondenes, Norway
- Died: 27 April 1953 (aged 62) Tromsø, Norway
- Citizenship: Norway
- Profession: Politician

Arne Gunerius Aas (26 September 1890 – 27 April 1953) was a Norwegian civil servant and politician. He worked as a prosecutor in Tromsø from 1914 to 1916 and then held the same job in Tønsberg from 1916 to 1918. He worked as a private lawyer starting in 1918. He was elected to the city council of Tønsberg in 1927 and then he held the position of mayor of Tønsberg from 1935 to 1936. In 1936, he was appointed as the sorenskriver (judge) in Varanger, based in the town of Vadsø. After World War II, he was appointed to be one of the war judges. Then, in 1946, he was appointed to be the County Governor of Troms county, a position he held until his death in 1953.

Government offices
Preceded by Hans Skotner (acting)	County Governor of Tromsø amt 1946–1953	Succeeded by Kristian Even Haug
