= Fakhra Salimi =

Pakistani-born Norwegian human rights activist, feminist, journalist and editor

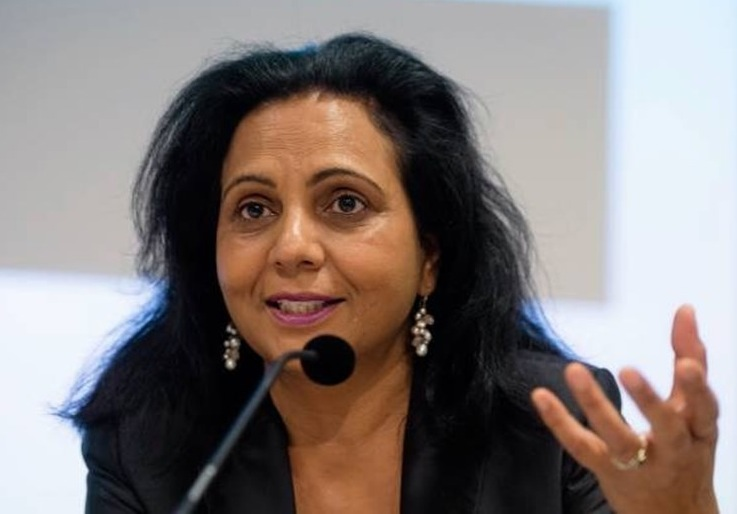
Fakhra Salimi

Fakhra Salimi (born 18 November 1957 in Lahore, Pakistan) is a Pakistani-born Norwegian human rights activist, feminist, journalist and editor. She is founder and executive director of the MiRA Resource Centre for Black, Immigrant and Refugee Women. The centre has consultative status with the United Nations Economic and Social Council and is under the royal patronage of Queen Sonja of Norway.

She has been a member of the board of directors of the Norwegian Centre Against Racism (1980–2003), a co-founder and member of the board of the directors of the Forum for Women and Development (1990–1995), a member of the advisory council of the Norwegian Study of Power and Democracy (1998–2003), a board member of Oslo University College, a jury member of the Norwegian government's Human Rights Prize for Journalists (2005–2009), and was a co-founder and the first vice president of the Norwegian Women's Lobby.

Salimi moved to Norway in 1979, and has studied sociology, anthropology, and media and communication studies. She worked as a journalist with the NRK in the early 1980s. Her brother Khalid Salimi is also a prominent human rights activist in Norway.

== Awards ==
- Gender Equality Prize of the Confederation of Vocational Unions, 1999
- Ossietzky Prize of PEN Norway, 2005
- Public Health Prize, 2005
- Girls' Prize of Plan Norway
- Prize for the Advancement of the Rule of Law (Rettssikkerhetsprisen) of the Norwegian Association of Lawyers, 2015
- Medal of St. Hallvard, 2015
