= Åsne =

Åsne or Åsny is a Norwegian feminine given name derived from the Old Norse name Ásný. It is a dithematic name with two stems, 'as'/'os'/'áss', "god" and 'ny'/nyr', "new". Notable people with the name include:

- Åsne Havnelid, Norwegian businessperson and sports official
- Åsne Seierstad (born 1970), Norwegian journalist and author
- Åsne Valland Nordli (born 1975), Norwegian folk singer

== See also ==
- Åsnes
