= Haugeland =

Haugeland is a surname. Notable people with the surname include:

- John Haugeland (1945–2010), American professor of philosophy
- Trygve Haugeland (1914–1988), Norwegian politician
