= Treholt =

Treholt is a surname. Notable people with the surname include:

- Arne Treholt (1942–2023), Norwegian KGB agent
- Thorstein Treholt (1911–1993), Norwegian politician
