= Knut Ragnar Mikkelsen =

Norwegian police chief (born 1951)

Knut Ragnar Mikkelsen (born 18 March 1951) is a Norwegian police chief.

He was born in Lunde Municipality in Telemark county. He graduated with the cand.jur. degree. He was a police superintendent in the Oslo police from 1981 to 1988, and worked as police inspector from 1990 to 1997. From 1 November to 31 December 1994 he was acting chief of police of Oslo. He was the chief of police of Drammen Municipality from 1997 to 2001, and in 2001 he became assisting director of the National Police Directorate.

Police appointments
Preceded by Willy Haugli	Chief of Police of Oslo (acting); 1994	Succeeded by Ingelin Killengreen
