= Alf-Inge =

Alf-Inge is a Norwegian male given name. Notable people named Alf-Inge include:

- Alf-Inge Haaland (1972), Norwegian footballer
- Alf-Inge Jansen (born 1947), Norwegian political scientist
