= MiRA Resource Centre for Black, Immigrant and Refugee Women =

Norwegian non-governmental organization

- Formation: 1989
- Founder: Fakhra Salimi
- Type: NGO
- Headquarters: Oslo
- Executive Director: Fakhra Salimi
- Affiliations: Norwegian Women's Lobby, Forum for Women and Development
- Website: mirasenteret.no

The MiRA Resource Centre for Black, Immigrant and Refugee Women is a Norwegian NGO founded in 1989, which works to improve the living conditions of immigrant and refugee women in Norway. The founder and executive director of the centre is Fakhra Salimi. The MiRA Centre is funded directly over the state budget of Norway. It is one of the fifteen organisations under the royal patronage of Queen Sonja of Norway and was granted special consultative status with the United Nations Economic and Social Council in 2001.

The centre provides counseling, guidance, courses and organizes seminars, and participates in public debate. Among its core themes are forced marriage and issues related to sexuality. The MiRA Centre is a member of the Norwegian Women's Lobby and the Forum for Women and Development.
