= Tormod Petter Svennevig =

Norwegian diplomat (1929–2016)

Tormod Petter Svennevig (24 May 1929 – 24 November 2016) was a Norwegian diplomat and politician for the Centre Party.

He was born in Eide Municipality (now part of Grimstad Municipality), and took his Master of Arts degree in political science at the New School for Social Research in New York. He started working for the Ministry of Foreign Affairs in 1955, and was stationed at the embassy in SFR Yugoslavia from 1956 to 1958, Soviet Union from 1960 to 1963, the United Nations delegation from 1966 to 1968 and in the Soviet Union again from 1971 to 1972. In between he was stationed in Norway.

From 1972 to 1973 he was a member of Korvald's Cabinet as a State Secretary in the Ministry of Foreign Affairs. He represented the Centre Party and was also a member of the municipal council of Bærum Municipality and the Akershus county council. He has thus been one of the very few diplomats to hold an elected office in local politics in Norway.

Svennevig was a member of the Defence Commission from 1974 to 1978. He was then the Norwegian ambassador to Iran from 1979 to 1982, and doubled as ambassador to Pakistan. Here, his tenure coincided with the Iranian hostage crisis. Then, after a period as a deputy under-secretary of state in the Ministry of Foreign Affairs and the Ministry of Development Cooperation. He was the Norwegian ambassador to Poland from 1986 to 1991. He was then the Norwegian ambassador to Hungary from 1991 to 1994, doubling as ambassador to Croatia.

After his retirement he moved back to Homborsund in Grimstad Municipality. Here he chaired the local branch of Norges Forsvarsforening. He has been decorated as a Commander of the Royal Norwegian Order of St. Olav.
