= Guro Fjellanger =

Norwegian politician (1964–2019)

President of the Young Liberals of Norway
- In office 1986–1988
- Preceded by: Hege Berg-Nielsen
- Succeeded by: Atle Hamar

Minister of the Environment
- In office 17 October 1997 – 17 March 2000
- Prime Minister: Kjell Magne Bondevik
- Preceded by: Thorbjørn Berntsen
- Succeeded by: Siri Bjerke

President of the Forum for Women and Development
- In office 2014–2016
- Preceded by: Rina Mariann Hansen
- Succeeded by: Elin Ranum

Personal details
- Born: 26 January 1964 Bergen, Hordaland, Norway
- Died: 16 April 2019 (aged 55) Oslo, Norway
- Party: Liberal

Guro Fjellanger (26 January 1964 – 16 April 2019) was a Norwegian politician for the Liberal Party. She served as Minister of the Environment in the first cabinet Bondevik from 1997 to 2000. She was a private consultant and a board member of several government agencies and organisations, and a member of two government-appointed commissions.

== Early life ==
Fjellanger was born in Bergen as the daughter of Håkon Fjellanger, a professor, and Jorunn Carlsen, an interior decorator. She grew up in Stokmarknes and graduated high school in 1984. She later earned a degree in history from the University of Oslo in 1990.

== Career ==
In 1985, Fjellanger was appointed as secretary of the Young Liberals, the youth wing of the Liberal Party. From 1986 to 1988 she chaired the organization. In 1988, she became vice president of the organization Nei til EU, which opposes Norwegian membership in the European Union. She was then secretary-general from 1991 to 1995.

In 1994 Fjellanger became a member of the central committee of the Liberal Party. She served as her party's information director in 1995, and was vice president of the party from 1996 to 2000. In 1996 she also worked briefly as a manager in the Norwegian Society for the Conservation of Nature.

Following the 1997 general election when Magne Bondevik established his first cabinet, Fjellanger was appointed as Minister of the Environment. On 29 April 1998, she signed the Kyoto Protocol on behalf of Norway. She left the cabinet when the Bondevik's government lost a vote of confidence in March 2000. In the same year she stepped down as deputy leader of the Liberal Party.

From 2002 to 2004 she was the director of the Norwegian Centre Against Ethnic Discrimination, a government agency. She was a member of the board of the Norwegian Organization for Asylum Seekers from 1996 to 1997, and was chair of the Norwegian Institute for Water Research (2001–2007) and Ecolabelling Norway from 2004. Fjellanger was also a board member of the Norwegian Consumer Council (2008–2012) and the Oslo University Hospital from 2011. She was President of the Forum for Women and Development (2014–2016) and a member of the city council of Oslo from 2007 to 2015.

She was a member of two government-appointed commissions on the regulation of medical research and protection against discrimination of the disabled.

== Personal life ==
Guro Fjellanger was born with spina bifida, a dysfunction of the spinal cord which inhibits normal walking. She learned to walk to a certain degree, she later used a wheelchair exclusively. When she became Minister of the Environment she became the first Norwegian government minister with a disability. In 2007 she notably won a lawsuit against the state, who in 2004 had refused to grant her insurance coverage with Norwegian Public Service Pension Fund.

In a November 2018 op-ed for Dagbladet, Fjellanger wrote that she has "not been constantly, seriously ill for the past 54 years though [she has] lived with spina bifida." She revealed that she had cancer and recently contracted serious infections and atrial fibrillation. She died on 16 April 2019, aged 55.

Party political offices
Preceded by Hege Berg-Nielsen	Leader of the Young Liberals of Norway; 1986–1988	Succeeded by Atle Hamar
Political offices
Preceded by Thorbjørn Berntsen	Norwegian Minister of the Environment; 1997–2000	Succeeded by Siri Bjerke
