= Tine Sundtoft =

Norwegian politician

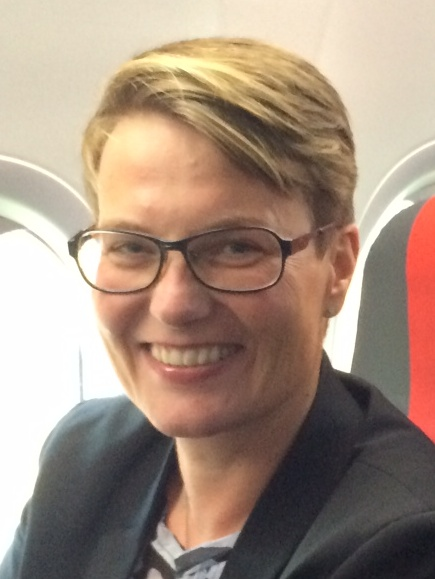
- Sundtoft in 2014

Minister of Climate and the Environment
- In office 16 October 2013 – 16 December 2015
- Prime Minister: Erna Solberg
- Preceded by: Bård Vegar Solhjell
- Succeeded by: Vidar Helgesen

Deputy Member of the Storting
- In office 1 October 1989 – 30 September 1993
- Constituency: Aust-Agder

Personal details
- Born: 19 April 1967 (age 59) Lillesand, Aust-Agder, Norway
- Party: Conservative
- Children: 2
- Education: BI Norwegian Business School

Kristine "Tine" Sundtoft (born 19 April 1967) is a Norwegian civil servant and politician for the Conservative Party. She was Minister of Climate and the Environment in Solberg's Cabinet from 2013 to 2015.

== Biography ==
=== Family and education ===
She was born in Lillesand as a daughter of county mayor Kristian Sundtoft and traffic teacher Barbro Rønnevig Sundtoft. After finishing secondary school at Møglestu in 1985 and attending Agder District University College for one year, Sundtoft graduated with a degree in business administration from the BI Norwegian Business School in 1990.

=== Early career ===
She was general secretary of Norwegian Young Conservatives from 1990 to 1992, political advisor for the Conservative Party in Parliament, and served as a deputy representative to the Parliament of Norway from Aust-Agder from 1989 to 1993. In total she met during 2 days of parliamentary session.

She was regional director of the Confederation of Norwegian Enterprise in Agder 1995–2005 and was the first woman to serve as chief administrative officer in Vest-Agder County Municipality from 2005 until she became minister.

=== Minister of Climate and the Environment ===
Sundtoft was appointed minister of the environment on 16 October 2013, after Erna Solberg became prime minister following the 2013 election.

Sundtoft was heavily criticised by the government's parliamentary partners, the Liberals and the Christian Democrats in October 2014 when the government's first budget was presented. Their criticism was primarily aimed at the lack of priority for the environment in the budget, criticism that was also mirrored by opposition party the Centre Party. Furthermore, the criticism was also mirrored by environmental organisations, such as Zero and Bellona. Sundtoft herself was never present when the budget was put forward, having instead visited an upper secondary school in Kristiansand. Her response to the criticism was: "This budget shows an investment in climate and environmental measures throughout all the other ministries. It has come as a result of me pressuring the other ministers". In regards to the budget, she stated: "I'm not a piece in a political game. The budget is a good starting point for negotiations".

After a year in office, Aftenposten evaluated her tenure so far as poor and didn't put forward the agenda herself, and that she seemed weak in debates. Sundtoft herself argued that, having been absent from national politics for 18 years, it had been difficult to take on a heavy responsibility in government. She also argued that she had worked hard, and never "worked harder in my life".

In April 2015, when asked if finance minister Siv Jensen's comments on climate change not being caused by humans would effect the budget negotiations for her ministry's field, Sundtoft dismissed it, arguing: "I am most concerned with what the government delivers in the field of climate change. We base our policy on the UN Climate Panel, and therefore have a more offensive climate policy than the previous government. We have been in government together for a year and a half, and we do much more in climate policy. We can only continue our important work".

In November, she was present at the 2015 United Nations Climate Change Conference, where she signed an agreement for continued forest cooperation.

Upon returning from the UN climate conference in Paris, it was announced that she would step down as minister in a reshuffle on 16 December. Sundtoft had herself wished to step down in order to look after her children. She was succeeded by Vidar Helgesen.

Political offices
Preceded by Bård Vegar Solhjell	Minister of Climate and the Environment; 2013–2015	Succeeded by Vidar Helgesen
