= Sylvi Graham =

Norwegian politician (1951–2025)

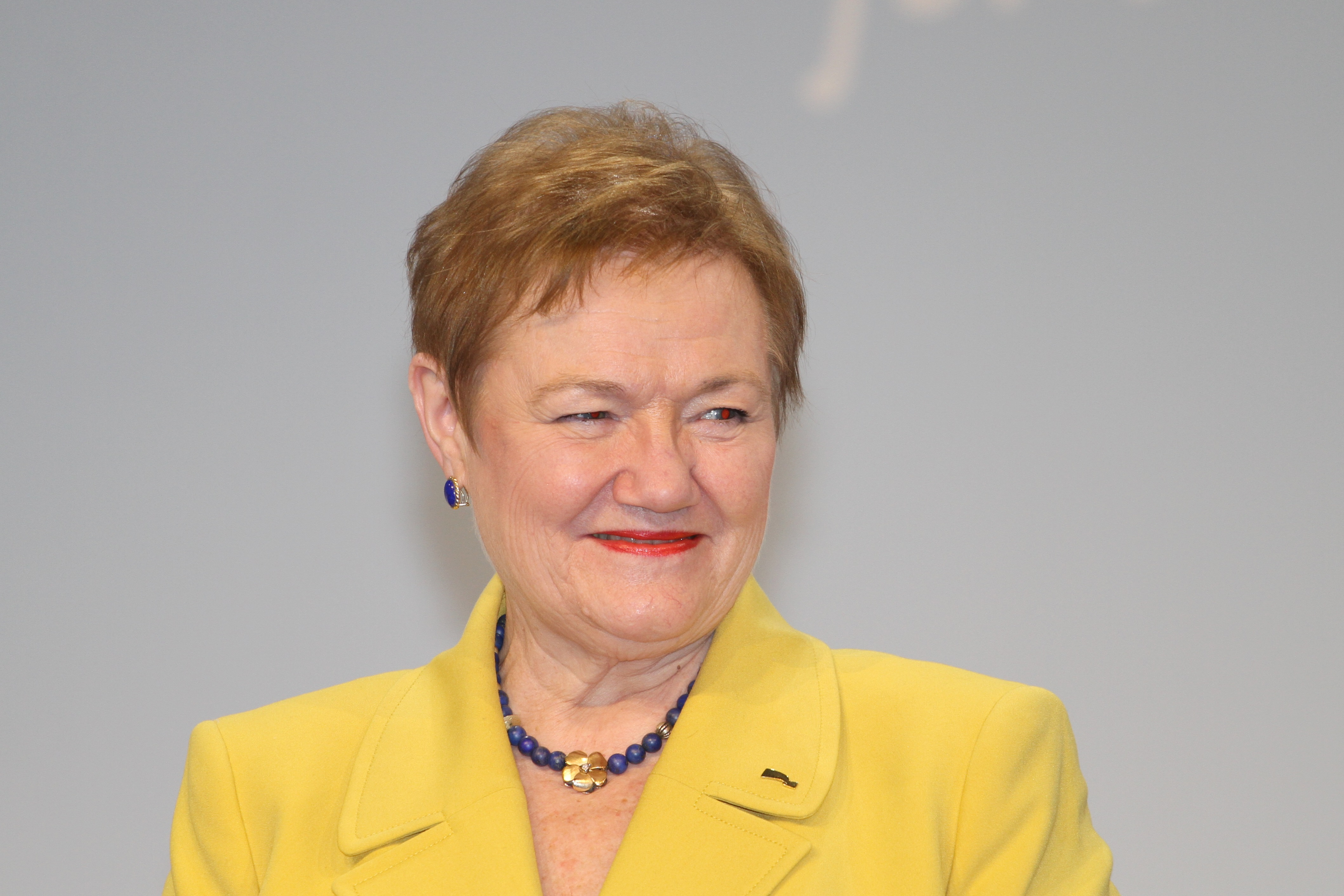
Sylvi Graham

Sylvi Graham (17 December 1951 – 12 July 2025) was a Norwegian politician for the Conservative Party.

From 2004 to 2005, during the Second Cabinet of Bondevik, Graham was appointed State Secretary of the Ministry of Foreign Affairs. She served as a deputy representative to the Norwegian Parliament from Akershus during the term 2005–2009. From 2017 she was President of the Forum for Women and Development.

On the local level Graham was the mayor of Oppegård from 1995 to 2004, and from 2005 onwards. She was first elected to Oppegård municipal council in 1980.

Graham died of natural causes on 12 July 2025 in her hometown of Oslo, Norway, at the age of 73.

== Parliamentary committees ==
- 2013 – 2017 member of the Standing Committee on Foreign Affairs and Defence
- 2009 – 2013 member of the Standing Committee on Labour and Social Affairs

== Sources ==
- "Sylvi Graham" (in Norwegian). Storting.
