= Wenche Frogn Sellæg =

Norwegian politician (born 1937)

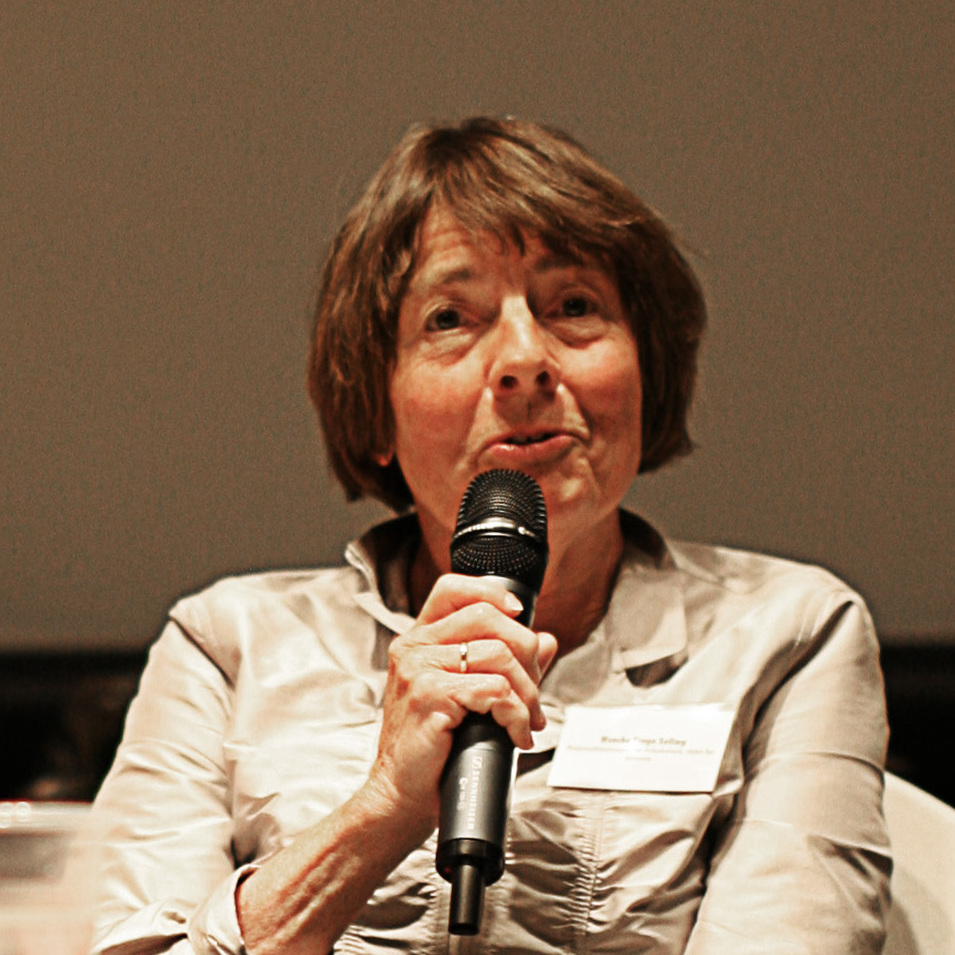

Minister of Social Affairs
- In office 16 October 1989 – 3 November 1990
- Prime Minister: Jan P. Syse
- Preceded by: Tove Strand
- Succeeded by: Tove Veierød

Minister of Justice
- In office 4 October 1985 – 9 May 1986
- Prime Minister: Kåre Willoch
- Preceded by: Mona Røkke
- Succeeded by: Helen Bøsterud

Minister of the Environment
- In office 14 October 1981 – 8 June 1983
- Prime Minister: Kåre Willoch
- Preceded by: Rolf A. Hansen
- Succeeded by: Rakel Surlien

Member of the Norwegian Parliament
- In office 1 October 1985 – 30 September 1993
- Constituency: Nord-Trøndelag

Personal details
- Born: 12 August 1937 (age 88) Oslo, Norway
- Party: Conservative
- Spouse: Johan Sellæg (m. 1976)

Wenche Frogn Sellæg (born 12 August 1937) is a Norwegian handball player, physician and politician for the Conservative Party. She was Minister of Environmental Affairs 1981–1983, Minister of Justice 1985–1986, Minister of Social Affairs 1989–1990 and a member of the Parliament of Norway from 1985 to 1993.

== Education, medical career and sport ==
She was born in Oslo as a daughter of Henry Frogn (1906–1982) and Bergljot née Osmundsen (1900–1988). After finishing her secondary education in 1957, she graduated with the cand.med. degree from the University of Oslo in 1963. She started her career as a physician at Molde Hospital before serving as a district physician in remote Værøy Municipality and Røst Municipality in 1965. In 1966, she moved to Ullevål Hospital and in 1968 to Drammen Hospital. She received a diploma of Tropical Medicine and Hygiene from the University of London in 1971, and from the same year she was a specialist in internal medicine. Finally, she was a doctor for a Christian mission in Bhutan in 1972 before settling in Namdal in 1973.

She played 42 matches as goalkeeper for the Norwegian national handball team from 1959 to 1968. Her clubs were Namsos IL, Molde HK and Frigg Oslo. She held various board positions in Frigg, and from 1967 to 1971 she was a board member of the Norwegian Confederation of Sports. From 1967 to 1969 she sat on the European Council's Committee on Women and Sport. Later reprising her board membership in the Confederation of Sports from 1987 to 1989, she also sat on another European Council committee, this time the Committee of Experts on the Organisation of Health Care for the Chronically Ill from 1996 to 1998.

Sellæg pursued her career as a physician further, becoming a specialist of gastroenterology in 1980. After two years at Namdal Hospital she became assistant chief physician in 1975. She married dentist Johan Sellæg in 1976. They resided in Overhalla Municipality.

== Political career ==
Sellæg then entered national politics. In the Conservative Party's landslide election in 1981, she was elected deputy representative to the Parliament of Norway for Nord-Trøndelag. She was later elected as a full representative in 1985 and 1989. Serving until 1993, she was deputy chair of the Standing Committee on Justice for the last three years.

However, the Conservative Party managed to form Willoch's First Cabinet in 1981 where Sellæg became Minister of the Environment. She lost her post when Willoch's Second Cabinet was formed in 1985, only to be brought back in 1985, this time as Minister of Justice. In Syse's Cabinet from 1989 to 1990, Sellæg was the Minister of Social Affairs. During the last two stints, her seat in Parliament was covered by Gunnar Vada and Snorre Gundersen respectively. As Minister of Social Affairs, Sellæg has been credited with the initiative to establish "charity hubs" in Norwegian municipalities.

Within her party, Sellæg chaired Namsos Conservative Party from 1974 to 1975, sat in the Conservative Party's central board and executive committee from 1982 to 1990, led its political platform committee from 1987 to 1989, served as the Conservative Party's deputy leader from 1988 to 1990, and lastly chaired its electoral committee from 1992 to 1994.

== Board memberships and later career ==
She was also a member of the Arts Council Norway from 1977 to 1985, the Sports Council from 1977 to 1981, the Museum Council from 1978 to 1982, the board of the National Gallery of Norway from 1980 to 1981, the Norwegian Directorate of Labour from 1983 to 1985 (deputy chair), the Defense Council from 1985 to 1986, Det interdepartementale polarutvalg from 1985 to 1986 (leader). She led the committee that produced the Norwegian Official Report 1987: 9 on working hours reform.

After her political career was over, Sellæg returned to Namdal Hospital as a chief physician for various departments between 1993 and 2002. Having become a specialist in geriatric medicine as well in 1992, she finished her professional career as a consultant in geriatric medicine until 2007. At the same time, she studied art history. In 2007, Sellæg became a board member of the Norwegian Cancer Society and from 2014 she chaired the Norwegian National Council for Senior Citizens. She was a founding member of the Norwegian Grandparents Climate Campaign.

In businesses and organizations, she was a board member of Den norske Creditbank from 1983 to 1987, supervisory council member of the Norwegian Bible Society from 1987 to 1993, supervisory council and corporate council member of Vinmonopolet from 1994 to 1996, and deputy board member of Sparebanken Midt-Norge from 1995 to 2005.

Political offices
| Preceded by Rolf Arthur Hansen | Norwegian Minister of the Environment; 1981–1983 | Succeeded by Rakel Surlien |
| Preceded by Mona Røkke | Norwegian Minister of Justice and the Police; 1985–1986 | Succeeded by Helen Marie Bøsterud |
| Preceded by Tove Strand Gerhardsen | Norwegian Minister of Social Affairs; 1989–1990 | Succeeded by Tove Veierød |
