= Siri Bjerke =

Norwegian politician (1958–2012)

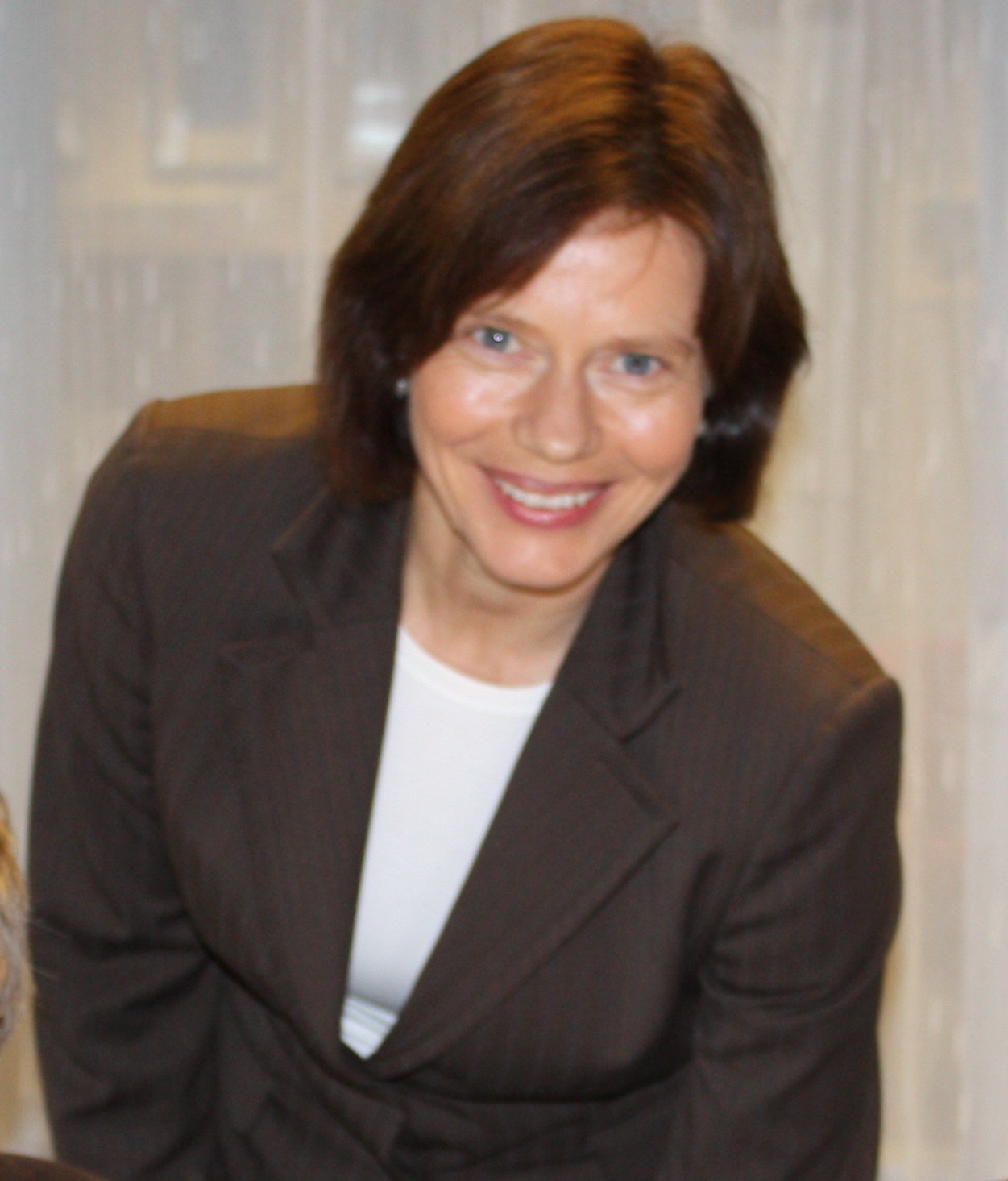
- Bjerke in 2009

Minister of the Environment
- In office 17 March 2000 – 19 October 2001
- Prime Minister: Jens Stoltenberg
- Preceded by: Guro Fjellanger
- Succeeded by: Børge Brende

Personal details
- Born: 19 June 1958 Oslo, Norway
- Died: 11 February 2012 (aged 53)
- Party: Labour Party
- Children: 2
- Relatives: Juul Bjerke (father); Rune Bjerke (brother)

Siri Bjerke (19 June 1958 – 11 February 2012) was a Norwegian politician (Labour Party). She was substitute member of the Norwegian legislature between 1997 and 2005, state secretary in the Ministry of Foreign Affairs between 1993 and 1997 and Minister of the Environment between 2000 and 2001 during Stoltenberg's first cabinet. After leaving politics she worked as a director for the Confederation of Norwegian Enterprise (2002–2005) and for Innovation Norway (2005–). She studied psychology at the University of Oslo.

Political offices
Preceded by Guro Fjellanger	Norwegian Minister of the Environment; 2000–2001	Succeeded by Børge Brende
