= Rolf Solem =

Norwegian police chief and judge (1917–2011)

- Born: 8 November 1917; Rjukan, Norway
- Died: 13 February 2011 (aged 93)
- Occupations: judge and police chief

Rolf Solem (8 November 1917 – 13 February 2011) was a Norwegian jurist, urban district court judge and police chief.

He was born in Rjukan. He was urban district court judge in Porsgrunn/Skien from 1973, and chief of police of Oslo from 1974 to 1985.

Police appointments
Preceded by	Chief of Police of Oslo; 1974–1985	Succeeded by Willy Haugli
