= Kristin Hille Valla =

Norwegian politician

County Governor of Oppland
- In office 1 October 2002 – 14 November 2014
- Prime Minister: Kjell Magne Bondevik; Jens Stoltenberg; Erna Solberg
- Preceded by: Knut Korsæth
- Succeeded by: Christl Kvam

Minister of the Environment
- In office 16 October 1989 – 3 November 1990
- Prime Minister: Jan P. Syse
- Preceded by: Sissel Rønbeck
- Succeeded by: Thorbjørn Berntsen

Personal details
- Born: 31 December 1944 (age 81) Årdal, Sogn og Fjordane, Norway
- Party: Centre

Kristin Hille Valla (born 31 December 1944 in Årdal Municipality) is a Norwegian politician in the Centre Party.

== Biography ==
From 1989 to 1990, while the cabinet Syse held office, Hille Valla was appointed Minister of the Environment.

On the local level she was a member of the municipal council of Nes Municipality from 1983 to 1987. From 1987 to 1991 she was a member of Buskerud county council. In 2001 she was appointed County Governor of Oppland.

From 1987 to 1991 she was the second vice leader of her party.

Outside politics she mainly worked as a teacher in Dovre and Nesbyen. From 1991 to 1998 she was the school director in Oppland county, and from 1998 to 2000 she was the director of the Norwegian Association of Local and Regional Authorities.

Preceded by Sissel Marie Rønbeck	Norwegian Minister of the Environment; 1989–1990	Succeeded by Thorbjørn Berntsen
Preceded by Knut Korsæth	County Governor of Oppland; 2002–2014	Succeeded by Christl Kvam
