= Sigurd Lambrechts =

Norwegian lawyer and civil servant

Sigurd Lambrechts (6 February 1863–10 October 1941) was a Norwegian lawyer and civil servant.

== Personal life ==
Lambrechts was born in Kristiania as a son of Chief Justice Morten Diderik Emil Lambrechts (1824–1900) and Karoline Mathilde Østrem. From 1894 to 1906 he was married to Augusta Mowinckel Ramm. In 1915 he married veterinarian's daughter Aagot Nyquist. Together with Augusta Mowinckel he had the son Finn Lambrechts.

== Career ==
He finished his secondary education in 1881, and graduated from the Royal Frederick University with the cand.jur. degree in 1886. He was hired as a clerk in the Ministry of Justice in 1889, and was promoted to deputy under-secretary of state in 1899. From 1906 he served as County Governor of Nedenes Amt, and from 1908 to 1933 County Governor of Kristians amt (later renamed County Governor of Oppland).

He also chaired Kristiania school board from 1904 to 1905, member of the examination commission for the cand.jur. degree, and extraordinary assessor in the Supreme Court of Norway in 1905 and 1906.

He was decorated as a Knight, First Class of the Order of St. Olav in 1904, and Commander, Second Class in 1933, Knight of the Order of the Polar Star and Commander of the Order of the Dannebrog. He died in October 1941.

Government offices
Preceded by Nikolai Prebensen	County Governor of Nedenes amt 1906–1908	Succeeded by Sven Aarrestad
Preceded by Peter Theodor Holst	County Governor of Kristians amt 1908–1933 (1919-1933: name changed to County Governor of Oppland)	Succeeded by Alfred Ihlen
