= Morten Diderik Emil Lambrechts =

Norwegian jurist and politician

Morten Diderik Emil Lambrechts (4 October 1824 – 28 May 1900) was a Norwegian jurist and politician.

He was born and died in Christiania. He was the father of Sigurd Lambrechts and a grandfather of Finn Lambrechts.

As a politician, he was elected to the Parliament of Norway in 1868, 1871, 1874 and 1880, representing the constituency of Christiania, Hønefos og Kongsvinger. This was before political parties existed in Norway, but Lambrechts was described as conservative-leaning.

In the judicial field, Lambrechts climbed the career ladder. He became Supreme Court judge and later assessor. He ultimately served as the eighth Chief Justice of the Supreme Court of Norway from 1887 to 1900.

He was decorated Knight of the Order of St. Olav in 1868, Commander, First Class in 1889, and was awarded the Grand Cross with Collar in 1891.

Legal offices
Preceded by Iver Steen Thomle	Chief Justice of the Supreme Court of Norway; 1887–1900	Succeeded by Einar Løchen
