= Vidar Helgesen =

Norwegian diplomat and politician

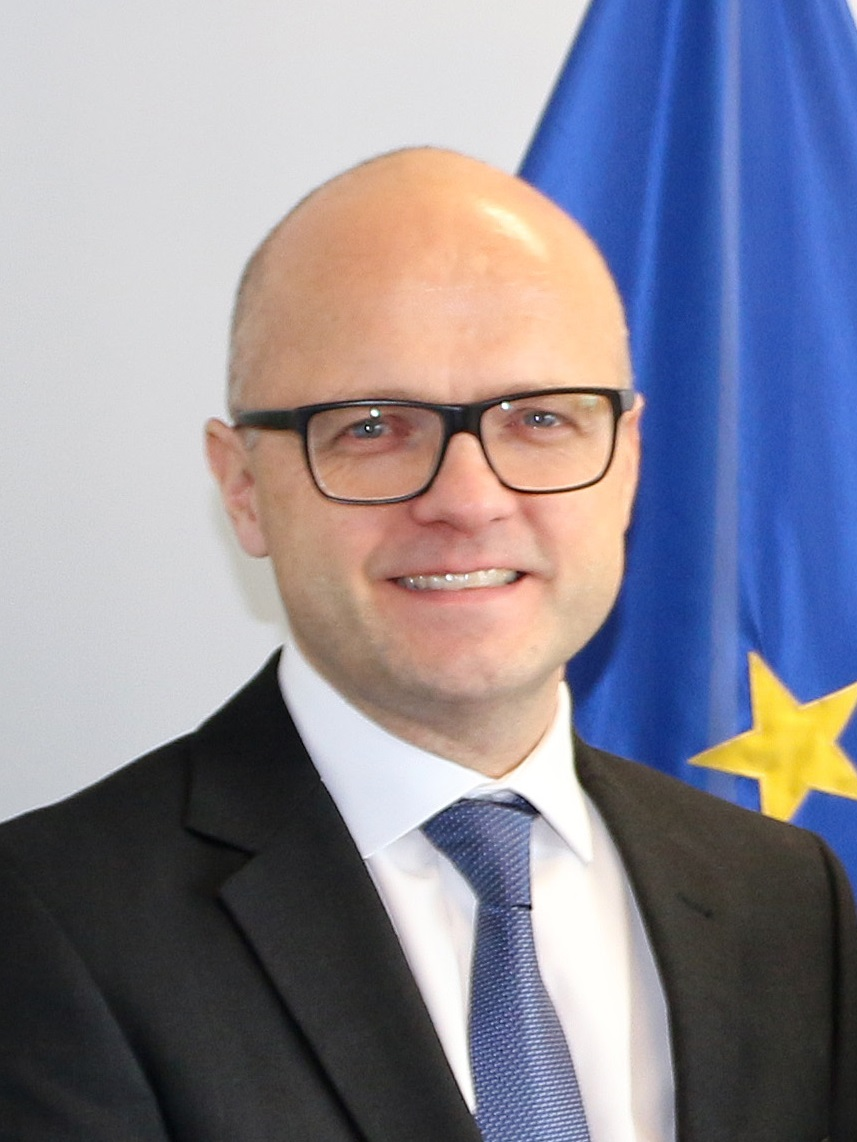

Minister of Climate and the Environment
- In office 16 December 2015 – 17 January 2018
- Prime Minister: Erna Solberg
- Preceded by: Tine Sundtoft
- Succeeded by: Ola Elvestuen

Minister at the Office of the Prime Minister
- In office 16 October 2013 – 16 December 2015
- Prime Minister: Erna Solberg
- Preceded by: Karl Eirik Schjøtt-Pedersen
- Succeeded by: Julie Brodtkorb

Minister of European Affairs
- In office 16 October 2013 – 16 December 2015
- Prime Minister: Erna Solberg
- Preceded by: Office established
- Succeeded by: Elisabeth Aspaker

State Secretary for the Ministry of Foreign Affairs
- In office 19 October 2001 – 17 October 2005
- Prime Minister: Kjell Magne Bondevik
- Minister: Jan Petersen

Personal details
- Born: 21 November 1968 (age 57) Bodø, Nordland, Norway
- Party: Conservative

Vidar Helgesen (born 21 November 1968) is a Norwegian diplomat and politician for the Conservative Party. He served as Minister of European Affairs and Chief of Staff to Prime Minister Erna Solberg from 2013 to 2015, and Minister of Climate and the Environment from 2015 to 2018.

== Career ==
He served as Secretary-General of the International Institute for Democracy and Electoral Assistance from 2005 to 2013. He was also a State Secretary at the Ministry of Foreign Affairs from 2001 to 2005.

=== Ministerial appointments ===
Helgesen was first appointed minister for European affairs, a post he concurrently held while being chief of staff to the prime minister; from 2013 to 2015. On 16 December 2015, he was appointed minister of climate and the environment, a position he held until early 2018, when he was succeeded by Ola Elvestuen once the Liberal Party had entered government.

=== Minister of European Affairs ===
He became the first minister of European affairs on 16 October 2013, a newly created ministerial post in Solberg's Cabinet following the Conservative victory in the 2013 election.

A month into his tenure, he presented the government's strategy to keep Norway visible in the European Union. Helgesen also pledged that they would fight for Norwegian interests within the EU.

In October 2014, Helgesen expressed support for the EU's goal for new energy efficiency, but noted that it would succeed more if it also was free of charge. This came in response to criticism from the Liberal Party, who criticised the government for not taking enough action against reducing emissions of greenhouse gases.

In December, he praised the decision to digitalise the Three Wishes for Cinderella film from 1973, noting that digitalising old films was important. He stated: "Digitalising this film makes it available on new media platforms. The alternative would have been that it would eventually be forgotten".

In late April 2015, Helgesen expressed concerns about Hungarian prime minister Viktor Orbán's comments that the death penalty should be a relevant debate. Helgesen stated: "Hungary is a democracy, but it is sometimes difficult to see the democratic mindset of Orbán in his statements". He also expressed that any EU member state that goes against the union's values should expect counter reactions.

=== Minister of Climate and the Environment ===
In a cabinet reshuffle on 16 December 2015, he was appointed minister of climate and the environment.

Helgesen was among the guests invited to the state dinner hosted by U.S. President Barack Obama in May 2016, which was in honor of Solberg and other Nordic leaders Lars Løkke Rasmussen, Sauli Niinistö, Sigurður Ingi Jóhannsson and Stefan Löfven at the White House.

=== Civic career ===
In June 2020, it was announced that he would become the next executive director of the Nobel Foundation. He assumed the position in January 2021.

In November 2023, it was announced that Helgesen would be appointed Executive Secretary of the Intergovernmental Oceanographic Commission, with the rank of Assistant Director-General at UNESCO.
