= List of county governors of Oppland =

Oppland coat of arms

Norway

The county governor of Oppland county in Norway represented the central government administration in the county. The office of county governor is a government agency of the Kingdom of Norway; the title was Amtmann (before 1919) and then Fylkesmann (after 1919). The county governor was based in Lillehammer. On 1 January 2019, the office was merged with the county governor of Hedmark into the county governor of Innlandet.

The large Akershus stiftamt was established in 1664 by the king and it had several subordinate counties (amt). In 1757, the large Aggershus amt was divided and the northern part became the new Oplandenes amt (later named "Oppland"). In 1781, the eastern part of the county was split off to form the new Hedemarkens amt (later renamed Hedmark) and the remaining part of the county became known as Christians amt (later renamed Oppland). In 2020, Hedmark and Oppland counties were merged into Innlandet county.

The county governor is the government's representative in the county. The governor carries out the resolutions and guidelines of the Storting and government. This is done first by the county governor performing administrative tasks on behalf of the ministries. Secondly, the county governor also monitors the activities of the municipalities and is the appeal body for many types of municipal decisions.

== Names ==
The word for county (amt or fylke) has changed over time as has the name of the county. From 1757 until 1781, the title was Amtmann i Oplandenes amt. From 1781 until 1877, the title was Amtmann i Christians amt. In 1877, the spelling was changed to Amtmann i Kristians amt. On 1 January 1919, the title was changed to Fylkesmann i Opland fylke. In 1949, the spelling of the name changed to Fylkesmann i Oppland fylke.

== List of county governors ==
Oppland county has had the following governors:

County governors of Oppland
Start	End	Name
1757	1759	Mathias Collett (1708–1759)
1760	1768	Christian Petersen (1701–1775)
1768	1781	Christian Frederik Holck (1734–1781)
1781	1811	Christian Sommerfeldt (1746–1811)
1811	1821	Ole Hannibal Sommerfeldt (1753–1821)
1821	1851	Lauritz Weidemann (1775–1856)
1852	1854	Hans Tostrup (1799–1856)
1854	1859	Johan Christian Collett (1817–1895)
1859	1869	Christian Jensen (1823–1884)
1869	1878	Hans Thomas Meinich (1819–1878)
1878	1900	Jan Greve Skjoldborg (1832–1901)
1900	1908	Peter Theodor Holst (1843–1908)
1908	1933	Sigurd Lambrechts (1863–1941)
1933	1947	Alfred Ihlen (1877–1961)
1941	1945	Arve Nilsen Frøisland (1885–1983) (WWII Occupied government)
1947	1961	Hans J. Gabrielsen (1891–1965)
1961	1976	Nils K. Handal (1906–1992)
1976	1981	Thorstein Treholt (1911–1993)
1981	2001	Knut Korsæth (1932–present)
2001	2015	Kristin Hille Valla (1944–present)
2 Mar 2015	31 Dec 2018	Christl Kvam (1962–present)
4 Mar 2016	31 Dec 2018	Sigurd Tremoen (1965–present); Acting for Kvam
1 Jan 2019	31 Dec 2019	Knut Storberget (1964–present)
Office abolished on 1 January 2019. See List of county governors of Innlandet
