= Helen Bøsterud =

Norwegian politician (born 1940)

Helen Marie Bøsterud
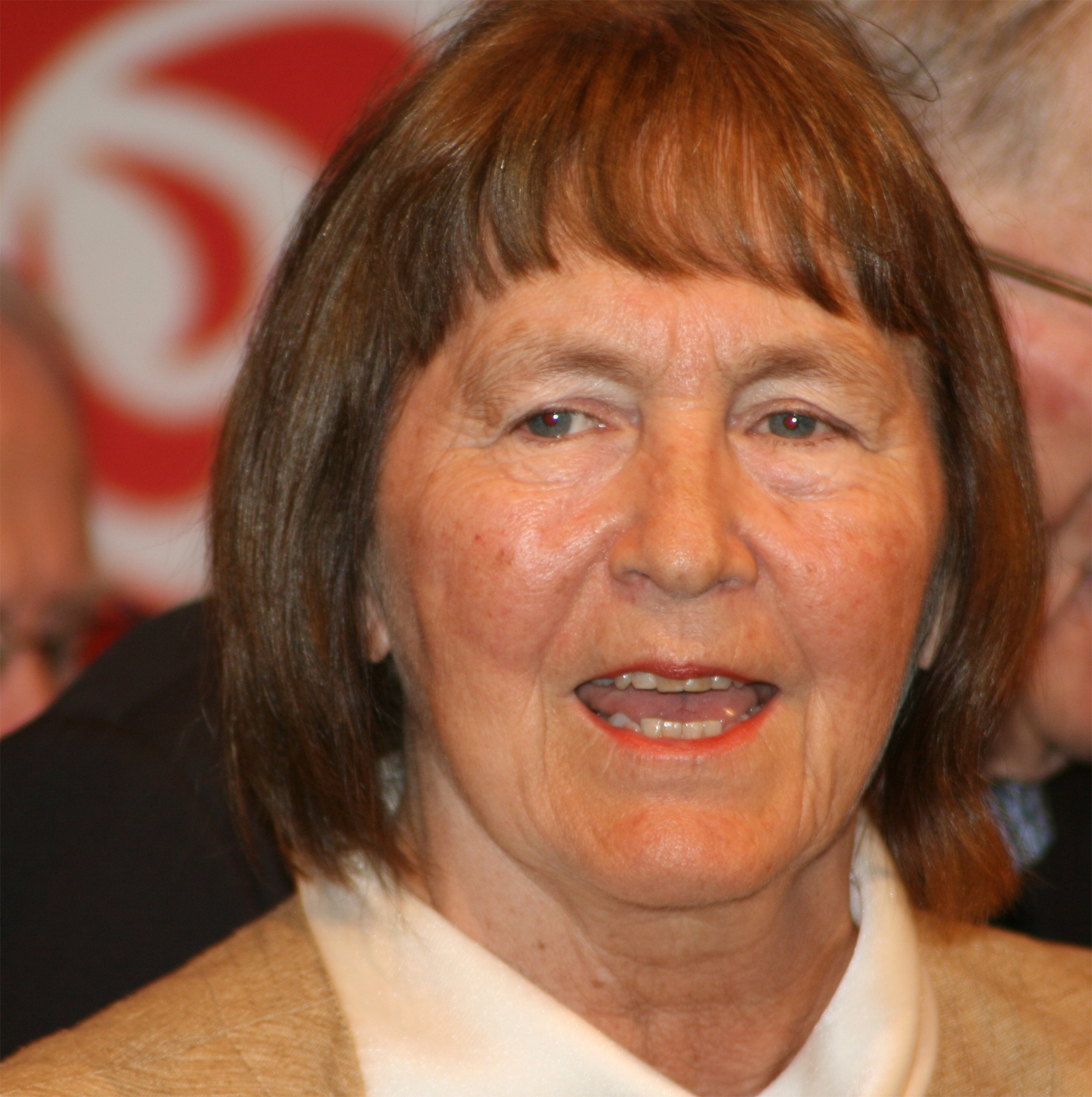

Minister of Justice
- In office 9 May 1986 – 16 October 1989
- Prime Minister: Gro Harlem Brundtland
- Preceded by: Wenche Frogn Sellæg
- Succeeded by: Else Bugge Fougner

State Secretary for the Ministry of Social Affairs
- In office 21 April 1980 – 14 October 1981
- Prime Minister: Odvar Nordli; Gro Harlem Brundtland
- Minister: Arne Nilsen

Member of the Norwegian Parliament
- In office 1 October 1977 – 30 September 1993
- Constituency: Akershus

Personal details
- Born: 15 February 1940 (age 86) Oslo, Norway
- Party: Labour

Helen Marie Bøsterud (born 15 February 1940) is a Norwegian politician for the Labour Party. She was the state secretary to the minister of social affairs 1980–1981, and later minister of justice 1986–1989.
