= Tove Veierød =

Norwegian politician (born 1940)

Minister of Social Affairs
- In office 3 November 1990 – 4 September 1992
- Prime Minister: Gro Harlem Brundtland
- Preceded by: Wenche Frogn Sellæg
- Succeeded by: Grete Knudsen

State Secretary for the Ministry of Culture
- In office 9 May 1986 – 31 May 1988
- Prime Minister: Gro Harlem Brundtland
- Minister: Hallvard Bakke
- Preceded by: Jan S. Levy
- Succeeded by: Hanna Marit Jahr

Personal details
- Born: Tove Liv Besstun Veierød; 19 September 1940 (age 85) Tromsø, Norway
- Party: Labour

Tove Liv Besstun Veierød (born 19 September 1940) is a Norwegian politician for the Labour Party. She was the state secretary to the Minister of Culture and Science 1986–1988, and Minister of Social Affairs 1990–1992.

Cultural offices
Preceded by Grete Øverlier	Chairman of Foreningen Norden in Norway; 2005–2010	Succeeded by Olemic Thommessen
