= Helga Gitmark =

Norwegian politician

Minister of the Environment
- In office 5 March 1973 – 16 October 1973
- Prime Minister: Lars Korvald
- Preceded by: Trygve Haugeland
- Succeeded by: Tor Halvorsen

Deputy Member of the Norwegian Parliament
- In office 1 October 1977 – 30 September 1981
- Constituency: Aust-Agder

Deputy Leader of the Centre Party
- In office 1973–1979
- Leader: Dagfinn Vårvik; Gunnar Stålsett

Personal details
- Born: 30 September 1929 Holt Municipality, Norway
- Died: 2 August 2008 (aged 78)
- Party: Centre

Helga Gitmark (30 September 1929 – 2 August 2008) was a Norwegian politician for the Centre Party.

== Biography ==
She was the Minister of the Environment from March to October 1973 during the cabinet Korvald, replacing Trygve Haugeland. She was also the world's first female environment minister. She lost this job when the cabinet Korvald fell.

She served in the position of deputy representative to the Norwegian Parliament from Aust-Agder during the term 1977–1981. On the local level she was member of the municipal council of Lillesand Municipality during the terms 1971–1975 and 1991–1995. She was born in Holt Municipality.

She was a member of the central committee of the Centre Party from 1969 to 1979, and was deputy party leader from 1973 to 1979. In addition she was a member of the board in several organizations within the Church of Norway, including the Diocese Council of Agder, as well as other Christian organizations.

Political offices
Preceded by Trygve Haugeland	Norwegian Minister of the Environment; March 1973 – October 1973	Succeeded by Tor Halvorsen
