= Julie Brodtkorb =

Norwegian politician (born 1974)

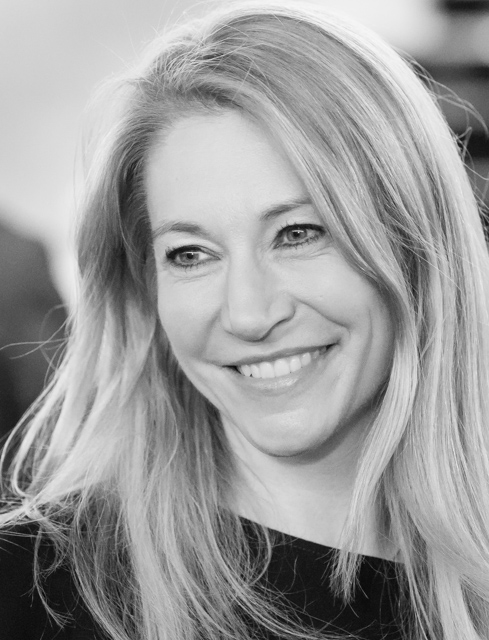
- Brodtkorb in 2017

Chief of Staff to the Prime Minister of Norway
- In office 16 December 2015 – 21 April 2017
- Prime Minister: Erna Solberg
- Preceded by: Vidar Helgesen
- Succeeded by: Lars Øy

State Secretary at the Office of the Prime Minister
- In office 16 October 2013 – 21 April 2017
- Prime Minister: Erna Solberg

Personal details
- Born: Julie Margrethe Brodtkorb; 29 October 1974 (age 51) Trondheim, South Trøndelag, Norway
- Party: Conservative

Julie Brodtkorb, formerly married Voldberg (born 29 October 1974 in Trondheim) is a Norwegian politician for the Conservative Party.

She graduated with the siv.øk. degree from the Norwegian School of Economics in 1999. After spending one year as a trainee in Geelmuyden Kiese from 2000 to 2001, she was hired as political adviser for the Conservative Party parliamentary caucus. In 2005 she was promoted to communications director, and in 2009 further to chief of staff for Erna Solberg. She left her job in 2010 to become communications director in Kristiania Eiendomsforvaltning, at the same time becoming leader of the Conservative Party Women's Forum. After being the chief executive officer of communications bureau JKL from 2012 to 2013 she was hired as a State Secretary in the Office of the Prime Minister as a part of Solberg's Cabinet.

She was active in the Young Conservatives in Trondheim in the early 1990s, and later leader of the Conservative Party branch in Aremark from 2005 to 2006. Here, she lived on a farm belonging to her then-husband Tore Aksel Voldberg. After marrying in 2004, the couple mostly lived at Skøyen Manor. They divorced in 2010. She was elected to office for the first time in 2011, when winning seats in both Ullern borough council and Oslo city council.

She has been in a relationship with William Nygaard in 2013. She was married with Thore Kristiansen from April 2017 to June 2018. On 18 March 2014 she spoke in support of gender equality in economics.
