= Peter Theodor Holst =

Norwegian politician

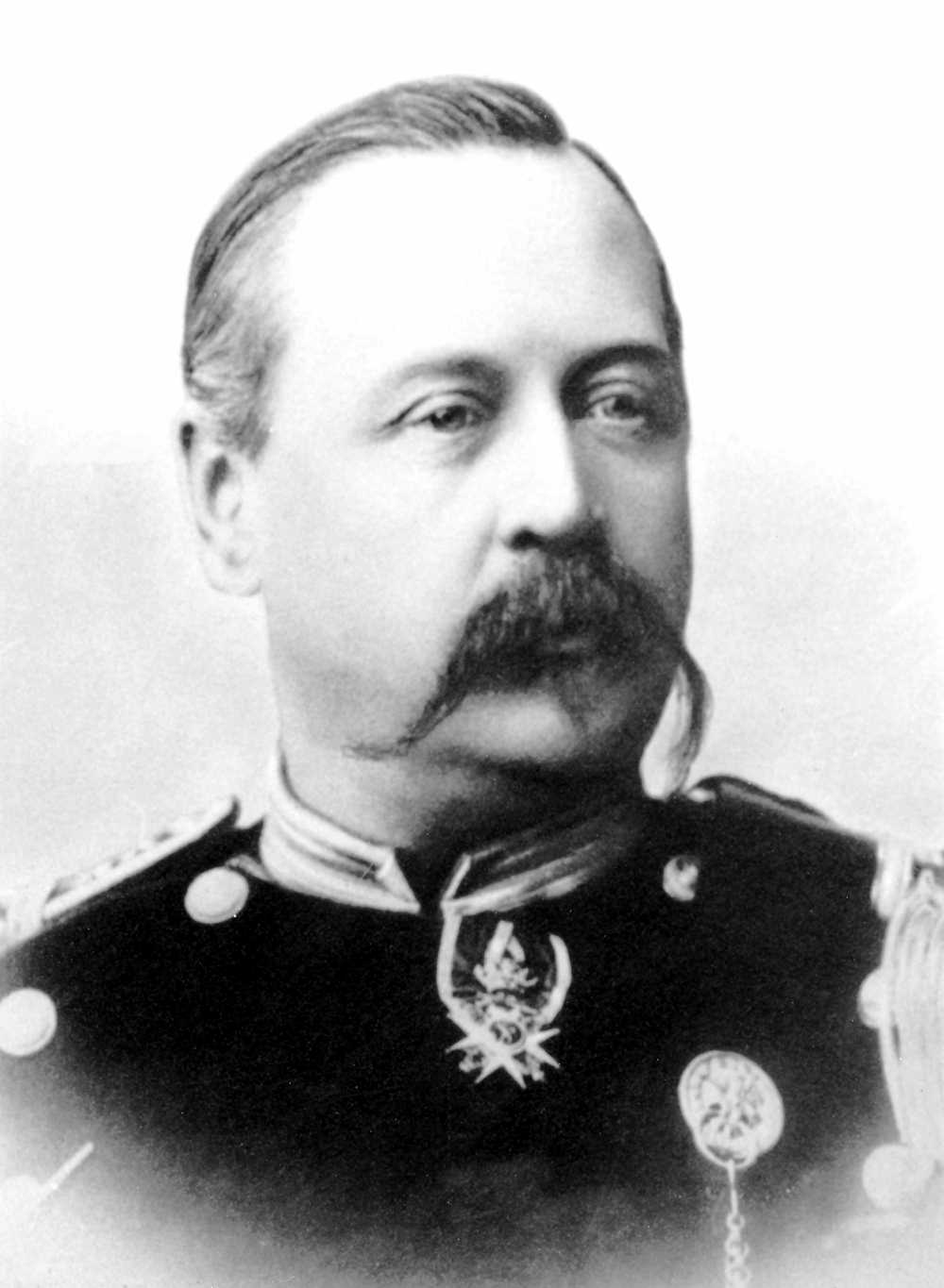

County Governor of Oppland
- In office 7 November 1900 – 9 January 1908
- Monarch: Haakon VII
- Prime Minister: Johannes Steen; Otto Blehr; Francis Hagerup; Christian Michelsen; Jørgen Løvland
- Preceded by: Jan Greve Skjoldborg
- Succeeded by: Sigurd Lambrechts

Minister of Defence
- In office 17 February 1898 – 6 November 1900
- Prime Minister: Johannes Steen
- Preceded by: Wilhelm Olssøn
- Succeeded by: Georg Stang
- In office 6 March 1891 – 2 May 1893
- Prime Minister: Johannes Steen
- Preceded by: Edvard Hans Hoff
- Succeeded by: Wilhelm Olssøn

Member of the Norwegian Parliament
- In office 1 January 1895 – 31 December 1900
- Constituency: Nordre Trondhjem
- In office 1 January 1886 – 31 December 1891
- Constituency: Nordre Trondhjem

Personal details
- Born: 7 December 1843 Trondhjem, Nord-Trøndelag, Sweden-Norway
- Died: 9 January 1908 (aged 64) Gjøvik, Oppland, Norway
- Party: Liberal

Peter Theodor Holst (7 December 1843 - 9 January 1908) was a Norwegian politician for the Liberal Party. He was Minister of Defence 1891–1893 and 1898–1900. Holst was an officer by profession, and was made Major General in 1899.

Civic offices
Preceded by Jan Greve Skjoldborg	County Governor of Oppland; 1900–1908	Succeeded by Sigurd Lambrechts
