= Rakel Surlien =

Norwegian politician (1944–2025)

Minister of the Environment
- In office 8 June 1983 – 9 May 1986
- Prime Minister: Kåre Willoch
- Preceded by: Wenche Frogn Sellæg
- Succeeded by: Sissel Rønbeck

Permanent Under-Secretary of State, Ministry of Justice and the Police
- In office 1995–1997
- Preceded by: Ingelin Killengreen
- Succeeded by: Morten Ruud

Judge, Borgarting Court of Appeal
- In office 1987–2001

Director, Independent Judicial Commission (reporting to the High Commissioner of Bosnia and Herzegovina)
- In office 2001–2004
- Appointed by: High Commissioner of Bosnia and Herzegovina

Judge, Borgarting Court of Appeal
- In office 2004–2016

Personal details
- Born: 10 February 1944 Norway
- Died: 29 July 2025 (aged 81)
- Party: Centre Party
- Occupation: Judge civil servant, politician

Rakel Surlien (10 February 1944 – 29 July 2025) was a Norwegian judge, civil servant and politician for the Centre Party.

== Life and career ==
Surlien was the Minister of Environmental Affairs from 1983 to 1986 during Kåre Willoch's second term as prime minister. From 1987 she was a judge at Borgarting Court of Appeal in Oslo. She was Director of the Independent Judicial Commission, reporting to the High Commissioner of Bosnia and Herzegovina 2001–2004. Thereafter she was a judge at Borgarting until 2016. During the same period, she was appointed an ad hoc member of the Efta Competition Agency. Surlien died on 29 July 2025, at the age of 81.

== Sources ==
- "Rakel Surlien" (in Norwegian). Storting.

Political offices
Preceded by Wenche Frogn Sellæg	Norwegian Minister of the Environment; 1983–1986	Succeeded by Sissel Marie Rønbeck
Civic offices
Preceded by Ingelin Killengreen	Permanent under-secretary of state in the Ministry of Justice and the Police; 1995–1997	Succeeded by Morten Ruud
