= Thorbjørn Berntsen =

Norwegian politician (born 1935)

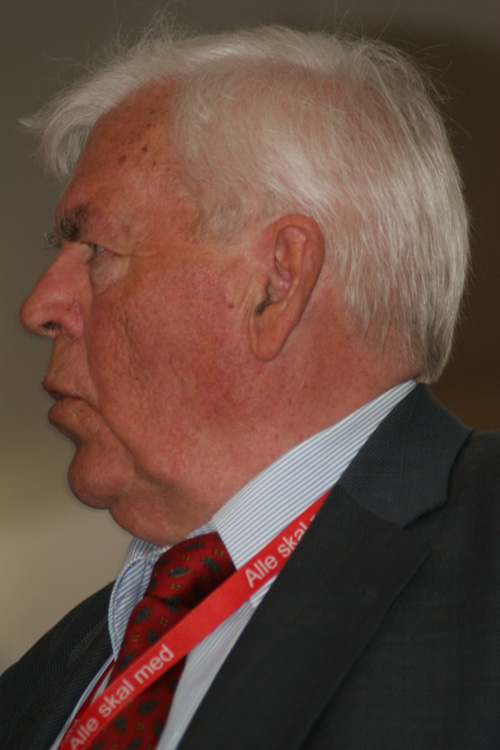
- Berntsen in 2007

Minister of the Environment
- In office 3 November 1990 – 17 October 1997
- Prime Minister: Gro Harlem Brundtland; Thorbjørn Jagland
- Preceded by: Kristin Hille Valla
- Succeeded by: Guro Fjellanger

Member of the Storting
- In office 1 October 1977 – 30 September 1997
- Constituency: Oslo

Personal details
- Born: 13 April 1935 (age 91) Aker municipality, Norway
- Party: Labour

Thorbjørn Berntsen (born 13 April 1935) is a former Norwegian politician representing the Labour Party. He was Minister of the Environment from 1990 to 1997. He was also a member of the Storting for Oslo from 1977 to 1997.

Political offices
Preceded by Kristin Hille Valla	Norwegian Minister of the Environment; 1990–1997	Succeeded by Guro Fjellanger
