= Ingelin Killengreen =

Former Norwegian police chief

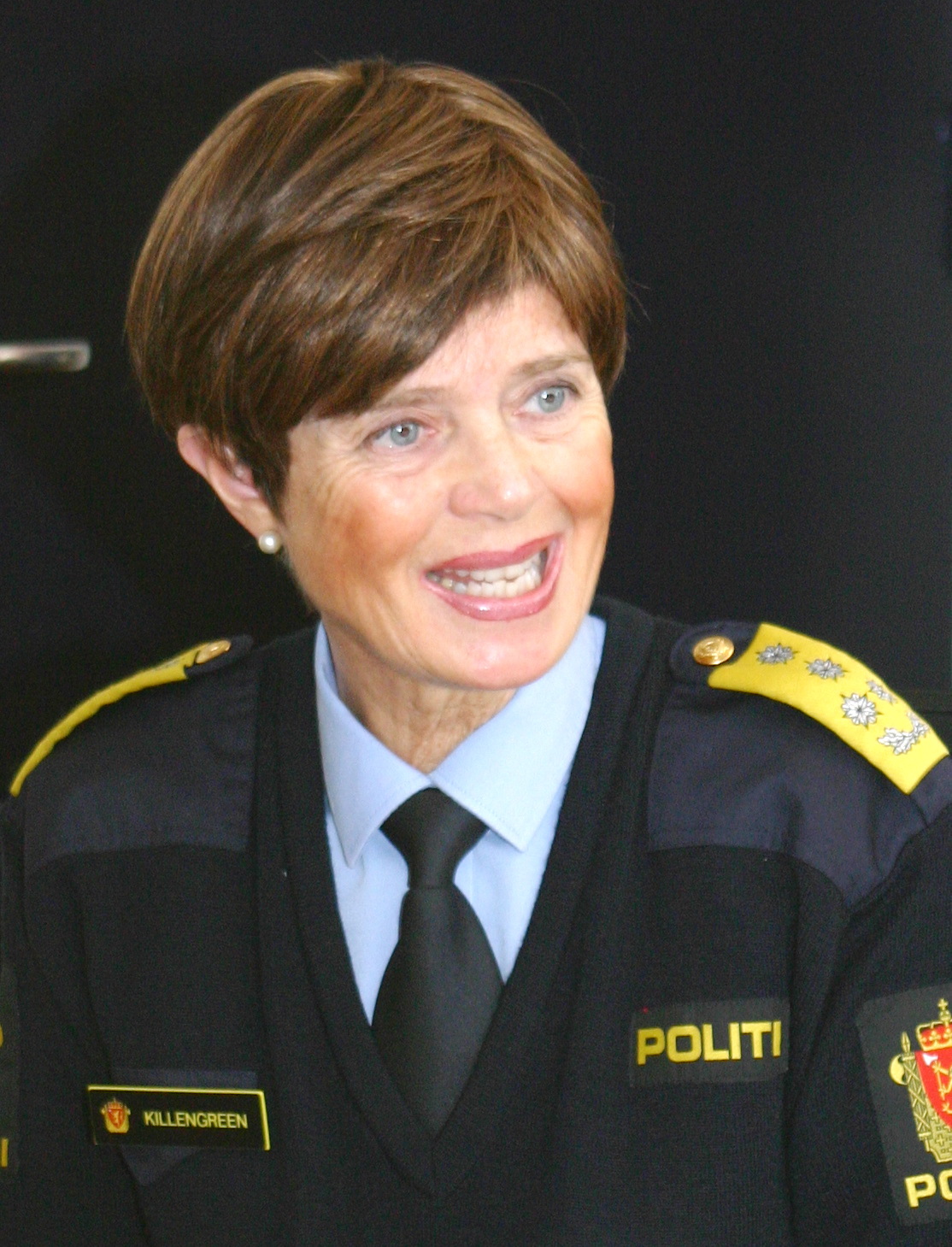
Norwegian Police Commissioner (2000 - 2011) Oslo Chief Constable (1994–2000)

Ingelin Christine Killengreen (born 12 November 1947) is a Norwegian jurist and former Police Commissioner in the National Police Directorate.

Killengreen was born in Bergen. In her youth, she attended Bergen Cathedral School. She graduated at the University of Oslo as a cand.jur. in 1972. After working for more than 20 years in the Norwegian Ministry of Justice and the Police, where she held positions as deputy under-secretary of state (1988—1993) and permanent under-secretary of state (1993—1994), she became the first female Police Chief in Oslo in 1995.

When the National Police Directorate was created in 2000, Killengreen was appointed as the first Police Commissioner. In 2001, Killengreen headed a large reform in the Norwegian police when the number of regional districts were reduced from 54 to 27. In 2011, she was appointed as permanent under-secretary of state in the Ministry of Government Administration, Reform and Church Affairs.

Police appointments
Preceded by Willy Haugli	Chief of Police of Oslo; 1995–2000	Succeeded by Anstein Gjengedal
Preceded by position created	Director of the National Police Directorate; 2000–2011	Succeeded by Vidar Refvik (acting)
Civic offices
Preceded by Leif Eldring	Permanent under-secretary of state in the Ministry of Justice and the Police; 1993–1994	Succeeded by Rakel Surlien
Preceded by Karin Moe Røisland	Permanent under-secretary of state in the Ministry of Government Administration, Reform and Church Affairs; 2011–present	Incumbent
