= Thorstein Treholt =

Norwegian politician

County Governor of Oppland
- In office 1976–1981
- Monarch: Olav V
- Prime Minister: Odvar Nordli
- Preceded by: Nils Handal
- Succeeded by: Knut Korsæth

Minister of Agriculture
- In office 16 October 1973 – 15 January 1976
- Prime Minister: Trygve Bratteli
- Preceded by: Einar Moxnes
- Succeeded by: Oskar Øksnes
- In office 17 March 1971 – 18 October 1972
- Prime Minister: Trygve Bratteli
- Preceded by: Hallvard Eika
- Succeeded by: Einar Moxnes

Personal details
- Born: 13 April 1911 Skoger, Buskerud, Norway
- Died: 17 March 1993 (aged 81)
- Party: Labour
- Spouse: Olga Lyngstad
- Children: Arne Treholt

Thorstein Treholt (13 April 1911 – 17 March 1993) was a Norwegian politician for the Labour Party. He was the father of convicted Norwegian spy Arne Treholt. He was born in Skoger Municipality.

An agronomist by education, Treholt was state secretary to the Minister of Agriculture from 1954 to 1957, serving under three different ministers during the period (Rasmus Nordbø, Olav Meisdalshagen and Harald Johan Løbak). He later became the Minister of Agriculture in 1971–1972 in the first cabinet Bratteli and 1973–1976 in the second cabinet Bratteli, the two periods only interrupted by the non-labour cabinet Korvald. Meanwhile, Treholt was appointed to cabinet his place was filled by Magne Kristian Mælumshagen and Åge Hovengen.

As an elected politician he was elected to the Norwegian Parliament from Oppland in 1958, and later re-elected on four occasions. On the local level he was a member of the municipality councils of Nord-Aurdal Municipality 1951–1955, Brandbu Municipality 1959–1961 and Gran Municipality from 1962 to 1967.

His career in politics ended with the post of County Governor of Oppland, which he held from 1976 to 1981.

Political offices
Preceded by Hallvard Eika	Minister of Agriculture; 1971–1972	Succeeded by Einar Hole Moxnes
Preceded by Einar Hole Moxnes	Minister of Agriculture; 1973–1976	Succeeded by Oskar Øksnes
Preceded by Nils K. Handal	County Governor of Oppland; 1976–1981	Succeeded by Knut Korsæth
