= Snorre Gundersen =

Norwegian politician (born 1947)

Snorre Gundersen (born 8 April 1947) is a Norwegian politician for the Conservative Party.

== Early life and education ==
He was born in Skogn. After finishing his secondary education in 1967, he graduated from teacher's college in 1972 and did undergraduate studies in biology in 1973. He was hired as a teacher, advancing to school inspector in Follafoss in 1976.

== Career ==
Gundersen was a member of the municipal council of Verran Municipality for two terms from 1979 to 1987, later Nord-Trøndelag county council from 1991 to 2003. He was elected as a deputy representative to the Parliament of Norway for Nord-Trøndelag in 1989. Since Wenche Frogn Sellæg was named to Syse's Cabinet, Gundersen took a regular seat in Parliament and was a member of the Standing Committee on Defence. Gundersen was also the leader of Nord-Trøndelag Conservative Party from 1985 to 2000, serving concurrently on the Conservative Party's central board.

In 1991, Gundersen was hired as school director of Verran Municipality, advancing to assisting chief administrative officer in 1995. He was the chairman of the Norges Bygdeungdomslag from 1999 to 2003, and also chaired the board of the Norwegian Industrial and Regional Development Fund during the same period. From 2005 to 2007 he was the president of Nord-Trøndelag Red Cross, later becoming vice president of the Norwegian Red Cross in 2014.
