= List of county governors of Innlandet =

The county governor of Innlandet county in Norway represents the central government administration in the county. The office of county governor is a government agency of the Kingdom of Norway; the title was Amtmann (before 1919), then Fylkesmann (from 1919 to 2020), and then Statsforvalteren (since 2021).

Innlandet county (with its current borders) was established on 1 January 2020 after the merger of the old Hedmark and Oppland counties. In preparation for the county merger, the government of Norway merged the offices of County Governor of Hedmark and County Governor of Oppland into one office starting on 1 January 2019.

The county governor is the government's representative in the county. The governor carries out the resolutions and guidelines of the Storting and government. This is done first by the county governor performing administrative tasks on behalf of the ministries. Secondly, the county governor also monitors the activities of the municipalities and is the appeal body for many types of municipal decisions.

== Name ==
The title of the office was originally Fylkesmann i Innlandet but on 1 January 2021, the title was changed to the gender-neutral Statsforvalteren i Innlandet.

== List of county governors ==
Innlandet county has had the following governors:

County governors of Innlandet
Start	End	Name
1 Jan 2019	present	Knut Storberget (born 1964)

== See also ==
For the county governors of this area prior to 2020, see:

- List of county governors of Hedmark
- List of county governors of Oppland
