= Edvard Hans Hoff =

Norwegian politician

Minister of Defence
- In office 13 July 1889 – 6 March 1891
- Prime Minister: Emil Stang
- Preceded by: Johan Sverdrup
- Succeeded by: Peter T. Holst

Personal details
- Born: 11 April 1838 Bergen, Hordaland, Sweden-Norway
- Died: 7 June 1933 (aged 95) Bergen, Hordaland, Norway
- Party: Conservative

Edvard Hans Hoff (11 April 1838 – 7 June 1933) was a Norwegian politician for the Conservative Party. He was Minister of Defence from 1889 to 1891. Hoff was military officer, and was promoted to Lieutenant General (generalløytnant) in 1905. He wrote the first bridge manual in Norway in 1907, titled Bridge - Spillets love, regler og etikette ("Bridge - the Laws, Rules and Etiquette of the game").
