= Atle Hamar =

Norwegian politician (born 1963)

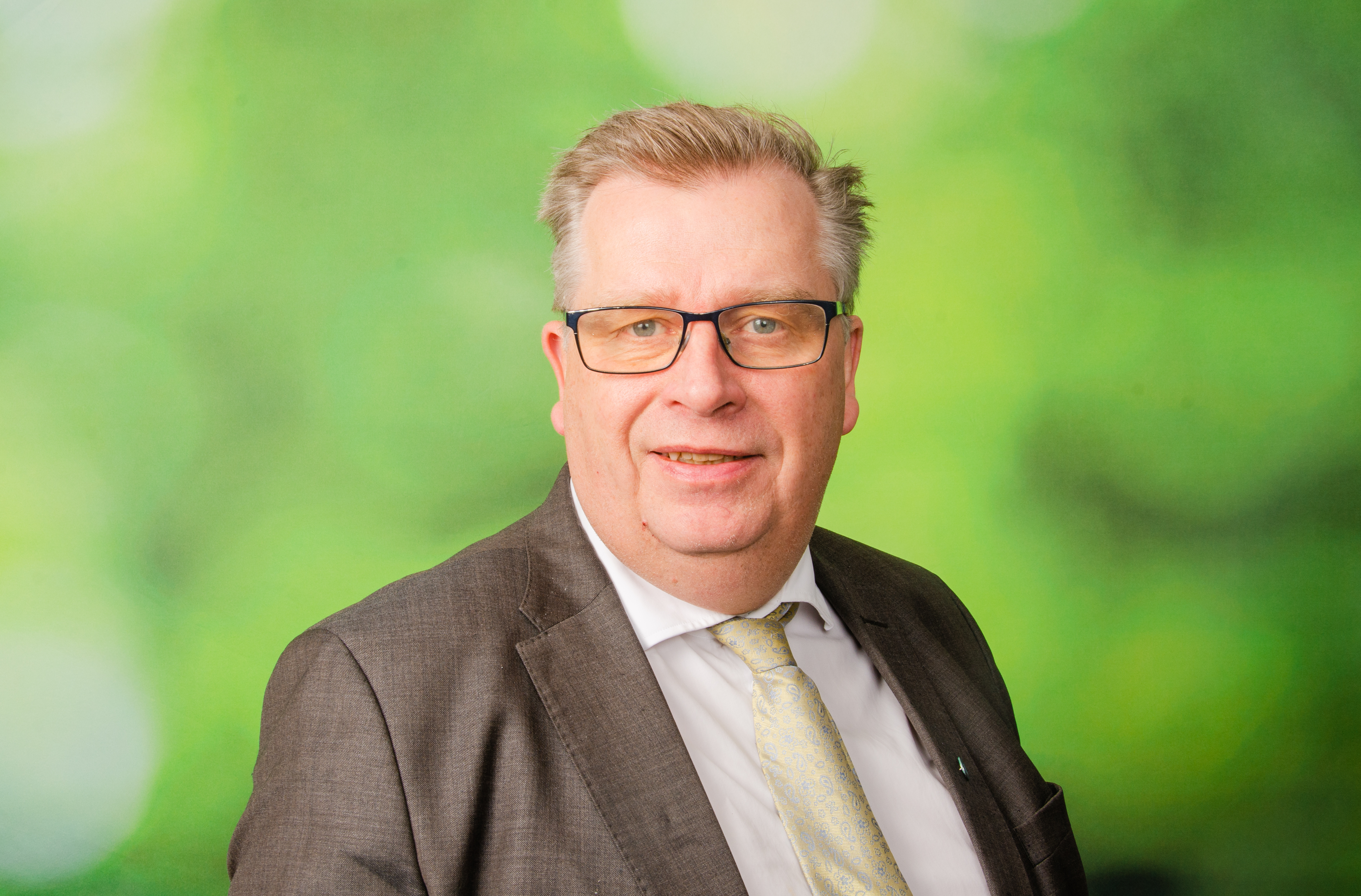

state secretary of the Ministry of Climate and Environment
- In office 2018–2020

state secretary of the Ministry of Justice and the Police
- In office 1999–2000

Leader of the Young Liberals of Norway
- In office 1988–1990

Personal details
- Born: 23 June 1963 (age 62)
- Political party: Liberal Party

Atle Hamar (born 23 June 1963) is a Norwegian politician for the Liberal Party.

From 1988 to 1990 he was the leader of the Young Liberals of Norway, the youth wing of the Liberal Party. He was a member of the municipal council of Jølster Municipality and also the Sogn og Fjordane county council.

In 1997, during the first cabinet Bondevik, he was appointed political advisor in the Ministry of Transport and Communications under Minister Odd Einar Dørum. When Dørum changed ministry to the Ministry of Justice and the Police in 1999, Hamar followed. He was soon promoted to state secretary, and held this position until the first cabinet Bondevik fell in March 2000.

Instead he was appointed director of the Norwegian Gaming Authority. In 2006 he was elected chair of the International Association of Gaming Regulators.

Party political offices
Preceded by Guro Fjellanger	Leader of the Young Liberals of Norway; 1988–1990	Succeeded by Gunn-Vivian Eide
Civic offices
New office	Director of the Norwegian Gaming and Foundation Authority; 2001–present	Incumbent
