= Minister of Climate and the Environment (Norway) =

Norwegian cabinet position

Minister of Climate and the Environment of Norway
- Klima- og miljøvernministeren

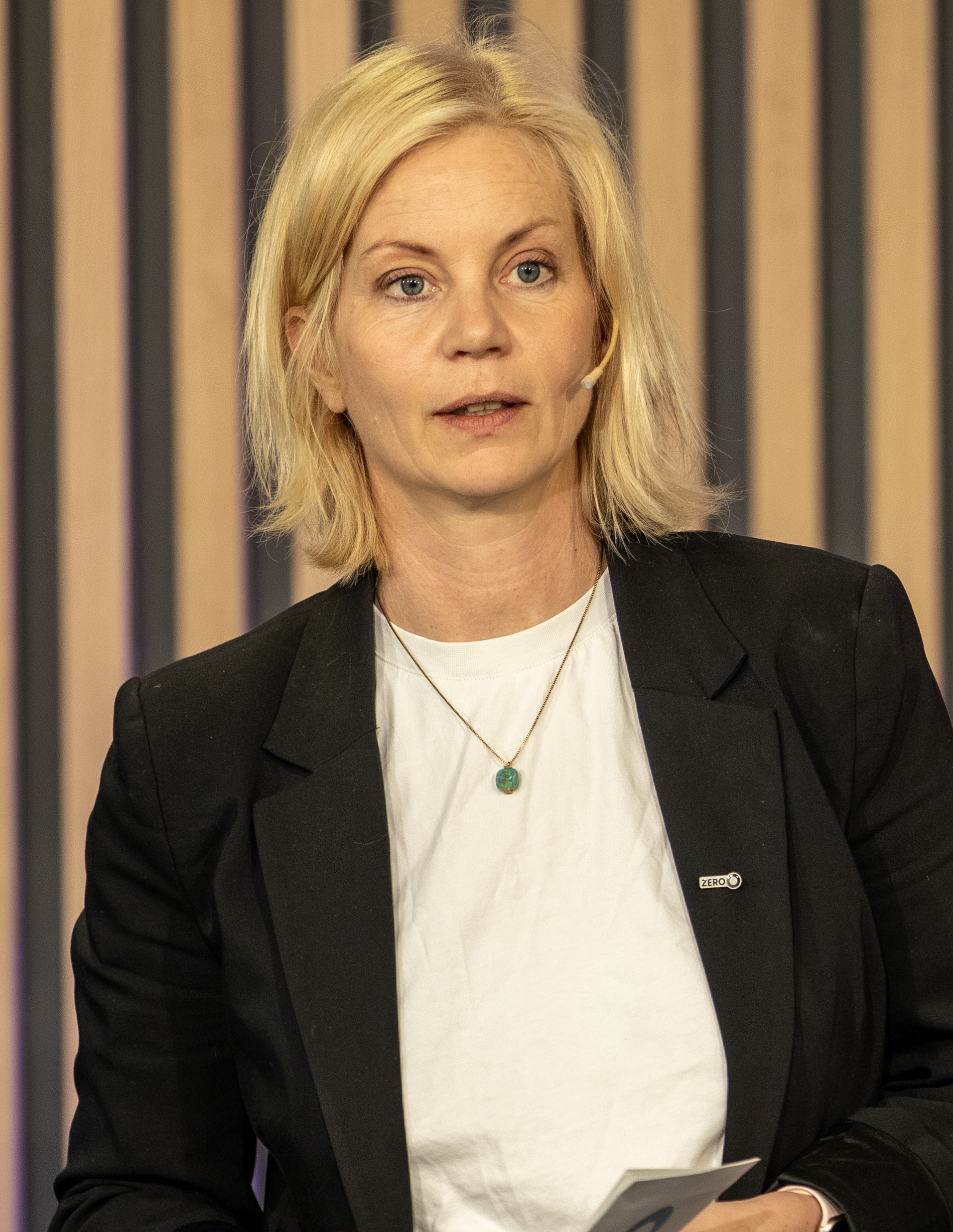
- Incumbent; Sigrun Gjerløw Aasland since 11 September 2026
- Ministry of the Environment
- Member of: Council of State
- Seat: Oslo
- Nominator: Prime Minister
- Appointer: Monarch; with approval of Parliament
- Term length: No fixed length
- Constituting instrument: Constitution of Norway
- Formation: 8 May 1972
- First holder: Olav Gjærevoll
- Deputy: State secretaries at the Ministry of the Environment
- Website: regjeringen.no/

The Minister of Climate and the Environment (Norwegian: Klima- og miljøministeren) is a Councilor of State and Chief of Norway's Ministry of the Environment. The current minister is Sigrun Gjerløw Aasland. The ministry is responsible for environmental issues, including influencing environmental impacts on other ministries. Subordinate agencies include the Directorate for Cultural Heritage, the Polar Institute, the Environment Agency and the Mapping Authority.

The minister and minister post were established on 8 May 1972. The title was known as the Minister of the Environment until 2013. Nineteen people from six parties have held the position. Thorbjørn Berntsen of the Labour Party has held the position the longest, a week short of seven years. Gro Harlem Brundtland, who held the position for five years, later became Prime Minister. Erik Solheim of the Socialist Left Party held the position concurrently with being Minister of International Development.

== Key ==
The following lists the minister, their party, date of assuming and leaving office, their tenure in years and days, and the cabinet they served in.

Centre Party
Conservative Party
Christian Democratic Party
Labour Party
Liberal Party
Socialist Left Party

== Ministers ==
Photo	Name	Party	Took office	Left office	Tenure	Cabinet	Ref
	Olav Gjærevoll	Labour	8 May 1972	18 October 1972	163 days	Bratteli I	
—	Trygve Haugeland	Centre	18 October 1972	5 March 1973	138 days	Korvald	
—	Helga Gitmark	Centre	5 March 1973	16 October 1973	225 days	Korvald	
—	Tor Halvorsen	Labour	16 October 1973	6 September 1974	325 days	Bratteli II	
	Gro Harlem Brundtland	Labour	6 September 1974	8 October 1979	5 years, 32 days	Bratteli II; Nordli	
—	Rolf Arthur Hansen	Labour	8 October 1979	14 October 1981	2 years, 6 days	Nordli; Brundtland I	
	Wenche Frogn Sellæg	Conservative	14 October 1981	8 June 1983	1 year, 237 days	Willoch I	
—	Rakel Surlien	Centre	8 June 1983	9 May 1986	2 years, 335 days	Willoch II	
—	Sissel Rønbeck	Labour	9 May 1986	16 October 1989	3 years, 160 days	Brundtland II	
—	Kristin Hille Valla	Centre	16 October 1989	3 November 1990	1 year, 18 days	Syse	
	Thorbjørn Berntsen	Labour	3 November 1990	17 October 1997	6 years, 348 days	Brundtland III; Jagland	
—	Guro Fjellanger	Liberal	17 October 1997	17 March 2000	2 years, 152 days	Bondevik I	
	Siri Bjerke	Labour	17 March 2000	19 October 2001	1 year, 216 days	Stoltenberg I	
	Børge Brende	Conservative	19 October 2001	18 June 2004	2 years, 243 days	Bondevik II	
	Knut Arild Hareide	Christian Democratic	18 June 2004	17 October 2005	1 year, 121 days	Bondevik II	
	Helen Bjørnøy	Socialist Left	17 October 2005	18 October 2007	2 years, 1 day	Stoltenberg II	
	Erik Solheim	Socialist Left	18 October 2007	23 March 2012	4 years, 157 days	Stoltenberg II	
	Bård Vegar Solhjell	Socialist Left	23 March 2012	16 October 2013	1 year, 207 days	Stoltenberg II	
	Tine Sundtoft	Conservative	16 October 2013	16 December 2015	2 years, 61 days	Solberg	
	Vidar Helgesen	Conservative	16 December 2015	17 January 2018	2 years, 32 days	Solberg	
	Ola Elvestuen	Liberal	17 January 2018	24 January 2020	2 years, 7 days	Solberg	
	Sveinung Rotevatn	Liberal	24 January 2020	14 October 2021	1 year, 263 days	Solberg	
	Espen Barth Eide	Labour	14 October 2021	16 October 2023	2 years, 2 days	Støre	
	Andreas Bjelland Eriksen	Labour	16 October 2023	11 September 2026	2 years, 330 days	Støre	
	Sigrun Gjerløw Aasland	Labour	11 September 2026	present	8 days	Støre	
