= Børge Brende =

Norwegian politician and diplomat (born 1965)

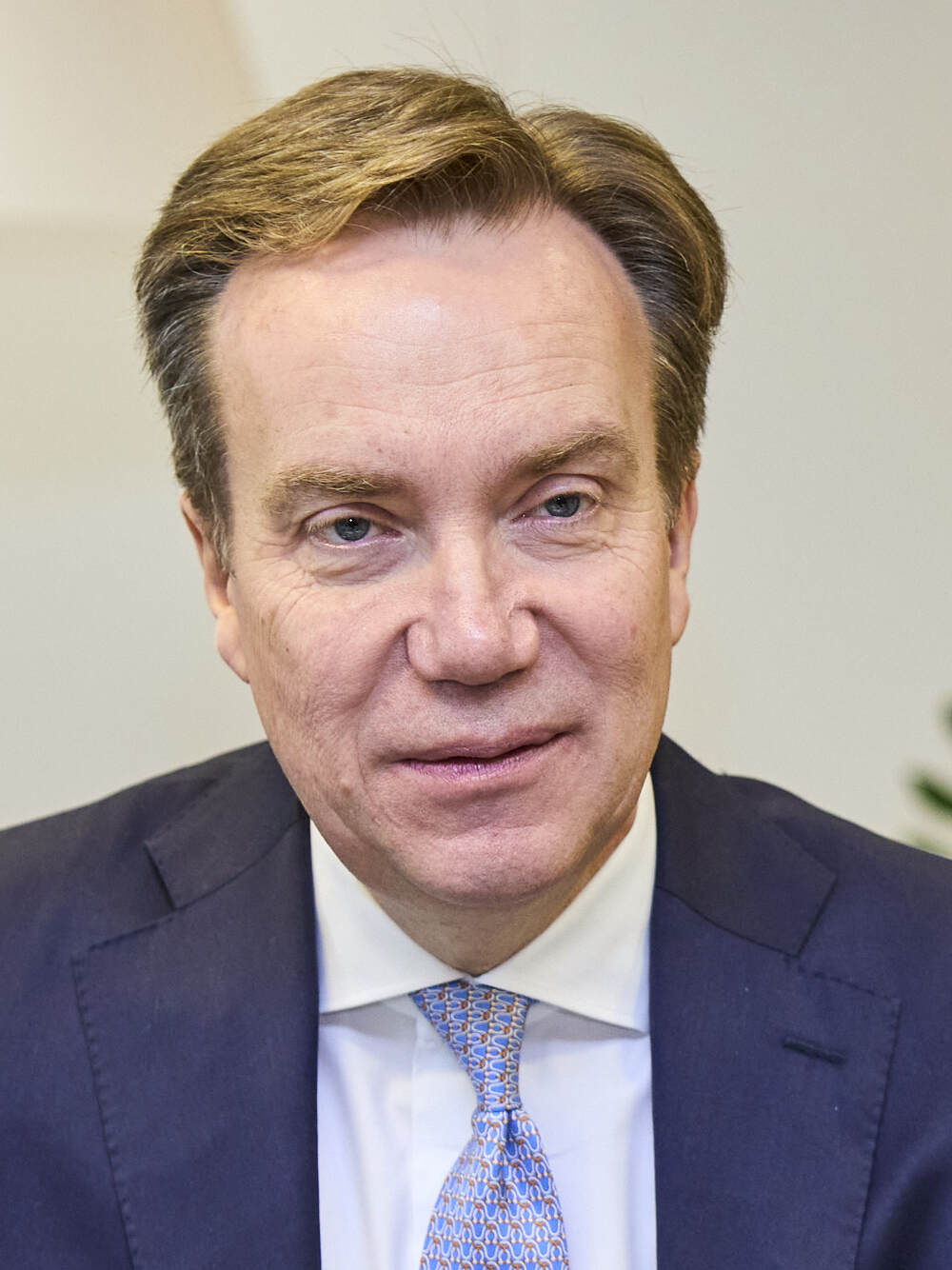
- Brende in 2024

President and CEO of the World Economic Forum
- In office 23 October 2017 – 26 February 2026

Minister of Foreign Affairs
- In office 16 October 2013 – 20 October 2017
- Prime Minister: Erna Solberg
- Preceded by: Espen Barth Eide
- Succeeded by: Ine Eriksen Søreide

Minister of Trade and Industry
- In office 18 June 2004 – 17 October 2005
- Prime Minister: Kjell Magne Bondevik
- Preceded by: Ansgar Gabrielsen
- Succeeded by: Odd Eriksen

Minister of the Environment
- In office 19 October 2001 – 18 June 2004
- Prime Minister: Kjell Magne Bondevik
- Preceded by: Siri Bjerke
- Succeeded by: Knut Arild Hareide

Member of the Norwegian Parliament
- In office 1 October 1997 – 30 September 2009
- Deputy: Linda Hofstad Helleland (2001–2005)
- Constituency: Sør-Trøndelag

First Deputy Leader of the Conservative Party
- In office 10 April 1994 – 29 March 1998
- Leader: Jan Petersen
- Preceded by: John G. Bernander
- Succeeded by: Inge Lønning

Leader of the Young Conservatives
- In office 26 June 1988 – 24 June 1990
- Deputy: Elisabeth Aspaker; Jan Tore Sanner
- Preceded by: Trond Helleland
- Succeeded by: Jan Tore Sanner

Personal details
- Born: 25 September 1965 (age 61) Odda Municipality, Hordaland, Norway
- Party: Conservative
- Spouse: Torild M. Brende
- Children: 2
- Education: Norwegian University of Science and Technology

Børge Brende (born 25 September 1965) is a Norwegian politician and diplomat. He was Minister of Foreign Affairs from 2013 to 2017, Minister of the Environment from 2001 to 2004, and Minister of Trade and Industry from 2004 to 2005. He was a member of the Norwegian parliament from Sør-Trøndelag from 1997 to 2009. He was the president and CEO of the World Economic Forum from 2017 to 2026. He resigned from the WEF in 2026 in light of the Epstein files controversy.^{,}

== Early life and family ==
Brende was born on 25 September 1965 in Odda, Norway. He is the son of Knut Brende, an engineer, and Kari Wesche. He has a younger sister named Urda. The family moved to Trondheim when Brende was two years old. Brende was a Boy Scout. He worked in his family's business from a young age.

Brende started learning politics at the age of 14 under Marvin Wiseth, who later became mayor of Trondheim. He studied briefly in the United States at the age of 15. He soon joined the Norwegian Young Conservatives and became its political secretary, first deputy leader, and finally leader in 1988.

Brende has a degree in economics, law and history from Norwegian University of Science and Technology (NTNU) in Trondheim, Norway. He graduated in 1997.

Brende raised two sons with his wife, Torild.

== Career ==
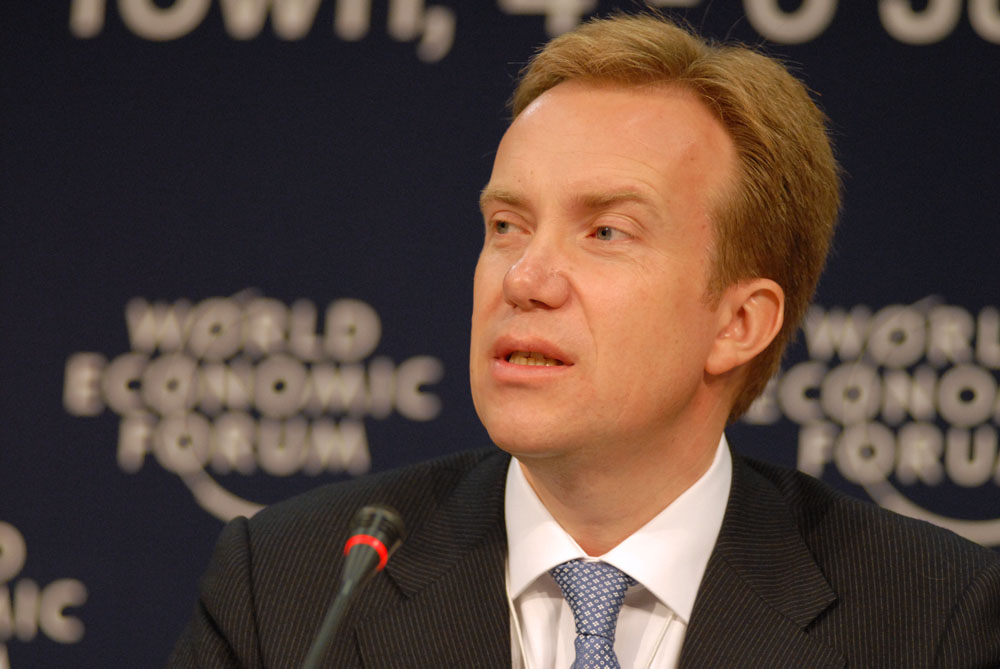
Brende in 2008

=== Trondheim City Council ===
Brende began his elected political career in local government with the 1991 Norwegian municipal elections, in which he won a seat on the Trondheim City Council. He was concurrently appointed to the municipal Executive Committee. He served on both bodies from 1991 until 1997.

During his two terms on the city council, Brende served as the leader of the Conservative Party's municipal group. He guided the party’s policy positions on municipal administration, local taxation, and urban planning. He concluded his service in municipal politics in 1997 upon his election to parliament.

=== Member of Parliament ===
Brende represented Sør-Trøndelag for the Conservative Party in the Norwegian Parliament over three consecutive parliamentary terms from 1997 to 2009. Prior to his election, he had served as a deputy representative during the 1989–1993 and 1993–1997 terms.

During his first term, Brende was a member of the Standing Committee on Finance and Economic Affairs. He served as the Conservative Party’s principal spokesperson on fiscal policy and financial regulation. From 1998 to 2001, he also served as deputy leader of the Conservative Party's parliamentary group.

Following his re-election in the 2001 parliamentary election, Brende’s seat was occupied by deputy representatives, principally Linda Cathrine Hofstad Helleland, pursuant to Article 62 of the Norwegian constitution, which requires members of the Council of State to vacate their parliamentary seats while serving in government.

After the 2005 parliamentary election, in which the Conservative Party lost power to the center-left Red-Green Coalition, Brende served in opposition. From 2005 to 2008, he served as the first vice chair of the Standing Committee on Energy and the Environment. He was the chief negotiator for the Conservative Party during the cross-party negotiations that produced the 2008 National Climate Agreement. He resumed the role of deputy parliamentary leader for the party from 2005 to 2007. Between 2008 and 2009, Brende served on the Standing Committee on Defence and the Enlarged Standing Committee on Foreign Affairs. He did not seek re-election at the end of his term in 2009.

=== Minister of the Environment ===
Brende served as Minister of the Environment in Kjell Magne Bondevik’s second government from 2001 until 2004. During Brende’s tenure as Minister of the Environment, the ministry advanced parts of the national park plan, including the 2003 expansion of Rondane National Park and creation of Dovre National Park, and the 2004 establishment of Skarvan og Roltdalen National Park. Official statistics also show an increase in the number and area of protected areas under the Nature Conservation Act between 2003 and 2004.

Between 2001 and 2003, he led Norwegian diplomatic efforts against radioactive discharges from the Sellafield nuclear reprocessing facility in the United Kingdom. He issued a formal protest to the British government to halt the release of Technetium-99 into the North Sea. In June 2004, his ministry oversaw Norway's implementation of the Stockholm Convention on Persistent Organic Pollutants, thereby enacting international bans on twelve hazardous industrial chemicals and pesticides.

In August 2002, Brende revoked a permit for a planned experimental release of carbon dioxide into the Norwegian Sea. An international research consortium, including the Norwegian Institute for Water Research (NIVA), had applied to discharge about 5.4 tonnes of liquid carbon dioxide at a depth of about 800 metres on the continental slope west of Storegga to study how it would behave in seawater. After a similar test off Hawaii could not be approved in time, Norway was chosen as the test site. The Norwegian Pollution Control Authority (SFT) granted a permit in July 2002, on the grounds that the release was small and not expected to cause significant harm. Greenpeace Nordic and WWF-Norway appealed. After the matter was raised in parliament, Brende ordered public hearings which were held in June 2002. He cancelled the permit the next month. The ministry’s decision said that deep-sea storage of carbon dioxide might conflict with international rules on the marine environment, including the 1992 OSPAR Convention. It said such releases had not been thoroughly examined under the relevant conventions and that the legal questions should be resolved prior to any such test.

In 2003, Brende chaired the twelfth session of the United Nations Commission on Sustainable Development. He served in this role through 2004. He led negotiations over global standards for drinking water access, sanitation, and housing.

Brende resigned as Minister of the Environment amid a cabinet reshuffle. He was appointed Minister of Trade and Industry. He was succeeded as environmental minister by Knut Arild Hareide.

=== Minister of Trade and Industry ===
On 18 June 2004, Prime Minister Kjell Magne Bondevik appointed Brende Minister of Trade and Industry. He succeeded Ansgar Gabrielsen.

In its 2005 annual report, the Ministry of Trade and Industry stated that new nationwide seed funds had been approved, with the state providing NOK 667 million in subordinated loans and NOK 167 million in loss-fund allocations. Earlier budget documents described the scheme as based on 50/50 participation by the state and private investors. In the ministry’s 2006 budget proposition, the government also proposed increasing user-directed research funding by NOK 131 million to about NOK 480 million, which it described as a 38% increase from 2005.

During his term as minister of trade and industry, Brende administered the "A Simpler Norway" programme. This was a government initiative to reduce regulatory burdens on business. His ministry also oversaw an increase of about 30 percent in state funding for industrial research and development. This funding was mainly administered through Innovation Norway and the Research Council of Norway. These funds supported programmes such as tax incentives, venture capital, and export promotion schemes.

Brende resigned this position on 17 October 2005 following the defeat of the Bondevik government in the September 2005 parliamentary election. He subsequently served as first deputy chair of the Standing Committee on Energy and the Environment while in opposition.

=== Norwegian Red Cross ===
In May 2009, the national board of the Norwegian Red Cross appointed Brende secretary general. He succeeded Trygve G. Nordby. Brende managed the organization's domestic operations and international disaster response programs.

Following the January 2010 Haiti earthquake, the Norwegian Red Cross deployed an emergency response unit that included a one-hundred-bed field hospital. Brende accompanied the initial relief flight, which diverted to Santo Domingo due to airspace congestion in Port-au-Prince, and traveled with the aid convoy overland into Haiti. The unit set-up the field hospital at the State University of Haiti Hospital to provide trauma and surgical care, later redeploying operations to Petit-Goâve. In August 2010, during the Pakistan monsoon floods, Brende conducted field assessments of Red Cross emergency water distribution and medical facilities in Khyber Pakhtunkhwa and the Swat Valley to coordinate expanded international aid.

Brende resigned in March 2011 to return to the World Economic Forum as managing director. In June 2011, Åsne Havnelid was appointed as his successor.

=== Minister of Foreign Affairs ===
In October 2014, Brende, in his capacity as Chairman of the Ad-Hoc Liaison Committee (AHLC), co-hosted the Cairo Conference on Palestine, an international donor conference on reconstructing the Gaza Strip, which generated $5.4 billion in pledges.

In 2015, Brende negotiated an interim agreement among Norway and the other coastal states in the Arctic including Canada, Denmark (on behalf of its territory of Greenland), Russia, and the United States, that prohibited commercial fishing in the international waters of the Arctic.

In January 2016, Brende was appointed by United Nations Secretary-General Ban Ki-moon to the High-level Advisory Group for Every Woman Every Child.

As Foreign Minister of Norway, Brende normalised diplomatic relations with China, after ties had been set back in 2010 following Chinese anger over the 2010 Nobel Peace Prize being awarded to imprisoned Chinese human rights activist Liu Xiaobo (1955–2017).

In December 2016, during Brende’s visit to Beijing as foreign minister, Norway and China announced the normalization of diplomatic and political relations after a six-year freeze. Brende said the two countries would immediately resume negotiations on a free-trade agreement.

In 2017, Brende met Russian foreign minister Sergey Lavrov in Arkhangelsk, where Svalbard was among the issues discussed. Brende said Norway and Russia had differing views on Svalbard policy and that he had argued Norway’s position.

Colombia Peace Process

Norway and Cuba facilitated secret negotiations between the Colombian government and FARC after Juan Manuel Santos was elected president in 2010. Upon becoming foreign minister in 2014, Brende visited both Colombia and Cuba with career diplomats to see the talks to their conclusion. A peace agreement was reached in 2016. Norwegian involvement heavily emphasized women's issues, security, and transitional justice. In addition to facilitating negotiations, Norway provided funding, technical assistance, and coordination to the Colombian government, relevant NGO programmes, and the United Nations for the implementation of the peace process.

On 23 June 2016, Brende attended the signing of the bilateral ceasefire between the Colombian government and FARC in Havana, representing Norway as one of two guarantor countries in the peace process alongside Cuba.

=== World Economic Forum ===
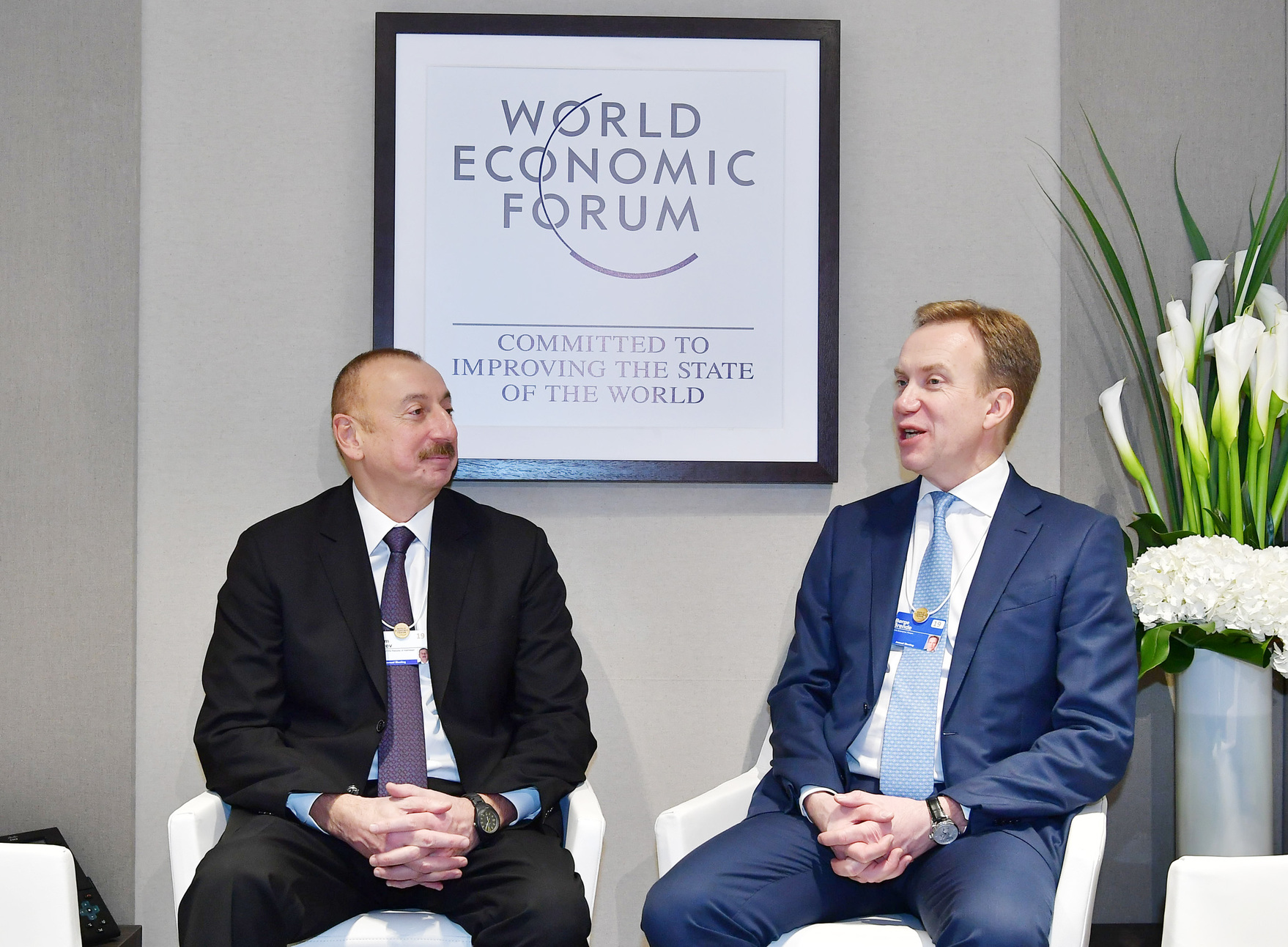
Brende meeting with Azerbaijan's President Ilham Aliyev

On 15 September 2017, it was announced that Brende would be the president and CEO of the World Economic Forum from mid-October 2017.

As President and CEO of the World Economic Forum (WEF), Brende promoted the idea of a Group of Three to include China, India, and the United States in 2023.

Brende resigned from the World Economic Forum on 26 February 2026, in light of the Epstein files controversy. He stated that he had decided to step down as President and CEO of the WEF after careful consideration, and that he believed it was the right time for the Forum to continue its "important work without distractions".

As of February 2026, Swiss authorities were investigating whether the World Economic Forum had broken the law by paying around 19 million NOK to CEO Brende in salary. This was 3 million NOK more than he reportedly earned the previous year. WEF is a tax-exempt non-profit organisation; excessive remuneration to board members or managers of non-profit foundations could potentially be considered illicit enrichment.

==== Contacts with Jeffrey Epstein ====
Brende was in contact with Jeffrey Epstein from 2018 to 2019. His exchanges with Epstein were published per the Epstein Files Transparency Act on 30 January 2026. Before this release, Brende denied meeting Epstein. Brende later said he did not know of Epstein's crimes, and that they had only met at three formal dinners.

Brende appeared with Steve Bannon and Norwegian diplomat Terje Rød-Larsen in a picture that Epstein sent in April 2018. In 2019, after the WEF and the United Nations signed an agreement, Brende visited Jeffrey Epstein. Brende also garnered controversy by suggesting the World Economic Forum could replace the United Nations in his communications with Jeffrey Epstein.

Brende said that in 2019, when Jeffrey Epstein was arrested, he had informed the World Economic Forum about their contacts. Klaus Schwab denied Brende's claim that he had informed WEF, and said legal action was considered.

Brende said he was unaware of Epstein's crimes but replied with a thumbs up emoji after Epstein sent a link documenting his sentence. Brende claimed he was "completely unaware" of this link and never opened it. Communications between Epstein and Brende also show them ridiculing the wife of Benjamin Netanyahu, Sara Netanyahu, calling her "Miss Piggy". Brende said he did not remember these messages. Brende stated in November 2025 that he had "nothing to do with Epstein". The Epstein Files showed that they had exchanged 120 messages and met on several occasions. Brende has frequently amended his explanations faced with new evidence of his communications with Epstein.

In February 2026, the World Economic Forum started an independent investigation of Brende as president and CEO. The goal of this investigation was to clarify his relationship with Jeffrey Epstein.

Brende was criticized by former prime minister Erna Solberg. She also stated that the Conservative Party did not share the idea that the World Economic Forum could replace the UN. The leader of the Liberal Party, Guri Melby, called the communications with Epstein "grotesque." She said: "Brende knew exactly who Epstein was and yet sits there eagerly nodding to his visions of global power. It's completely incomprehensible."

== Other activities ==
=== International organisations ===
- Asian Infrastructure Investment Bank (AIIB), Ex-Officio Member of the Board of Governors (2016–2017)
- Multilateral Investment Guarantee Agency (MIGA), World Bank Group, Ex-Officio Member of the Board of Governors (2013–2017)
- World Bank, Ex-Officio Member of the Board of Governors (2013–2017)

=== Corporate boards ===
- Statoil, Member of the Board (2012–2013)
- Mesta, Chairman of the Board (2009–2011)

=== Non-profit organizations ===
- Bilderberg Group, Member of the Steering Committee
- Paris School of International Affairs (PSIA), Member of the Strategic Committee
- P4G – Partnering for Green Growth and the Global Goals 2030, Member of the Board of Directors (since 2019)
- World Economic Forum (WEF), Member of the Europe Policy Group (since 2017)
- Norwegian Defence University College, Deputy Chairman of the Advisory Board (2010–2011)

== Recognition ==
- 2004 – Order of the Phoenix
- 2005 – Order of St. Olav
- 2005 – Order of Merit of the Italian Republic
- 2018 – Order of San Carlos

== See also ==
- List of foreign ministers in 2017
- List of current foreign ministers
- List of people named in the Epstein files

Political offices
Preceded by Siri Bjerke	Minister of the Environment; 2001–2004	Succeeded by Knut Arild Hareide
Preceded by Ansgar Gabrielsen	Minister of Trade and Industry; 2004–2005	Succeeded by Odd Eriksen
Preceded by Espen Barth Eide	Minister of Foreign Affairs; 2013–2017	Succeeded by Ine Marie Eriksen Søreide
Non-profit organization positions
Preceded by Trygve Nordby	Secretary General of the Norwegian Red Cross; 2009–2011	Succeeded by Åsne Havnelid
