= Sissel Rønbeck =

Norwegian politician (born 1950)

Minister of Transport and Communications
- In office 25 October 1996 – 17 October 1997
- Prime Minister: Thorbjørn Jagland
- Preceded by: Kjell Opseth
- Succeeded by: Odd Einar Dørum

Minister of the Environment
- In office 9 May 1986 – 16 October 1989
- Prime Minister: Gro Harlem Brundtland
- Preceded by: Rakel Surlien
- Succeeded by: Kristin Hille Valla

Minister of Administration and Consumer Affairs
- In office 8 October 1979 – 14 October 1981
- Prime Minister: Odvar Nordli; Gro Harlem Brundtland
- Preceded by: Kirsten Myklevoll
- Succeeded by: Astrid Gjertsen

Leader of the Worker’s Youth League
- In office 2 September 1975 – 14 October 1977
- Preceded by: Rune Gerhardsen
- Succeeded by: Thorbjørn Jagland

Personal details
- Born: Sissel Marie Rønbeck; 24 May 1950 (age 75) Hammerfest, Finnmark, Norway
- Party: Labour
- Spouse(s): Bjørn Tore Godal (1971–1981); Arne Wam (1983–)
- Children: 2

Sissel Marie Rønbeck (born 24 May 1950 in Hammerfest, Finnmark) is a Norwegian politician for the Labour Party.

== Biography ==
She was Minister of Administration and Consumer Affairs 1979–1981, Minister of Environmental Affairs 1986–1989, and Minister of Transport and Communications 1996–1997. Between 1981 and 1993 she was a parliamentary representative for Oslo in the Norwegian legislature, Storting. She is currently deputy director of the Norwegian Directorate for Cultural Heritage (Riksantikvaren), and a member of the Norwegian Nobel Committee.

Rønbeck attended Oslo Cathedral School, but did not complete her examen artium.

Political offices
| Preceded by Kirsten Myklevoll | Norwegian Minister of Administration and Consumer Affairs; 1979–1981 | Succeeded by Astrid Gjertsen |
| Preceded by Rakel Surlien | Norwegian Minister of the Environment; 1986–1989 | Succeeded by Kristin Hille Valla |
| Preceded by Kjell Opseth | Norwegian Minister of Transport and Communications; 1996–1997 | Succeeded by Odd Einar Dørum |
Party political offices
| Preceded by Rune Gerhardsen | Chairman of Workers' Youth League; 1975–1977 | Succeeded by Thorbjørn Jagland |
