= Christl Kvam =

Norwegian trade unionist, civil servant, politician

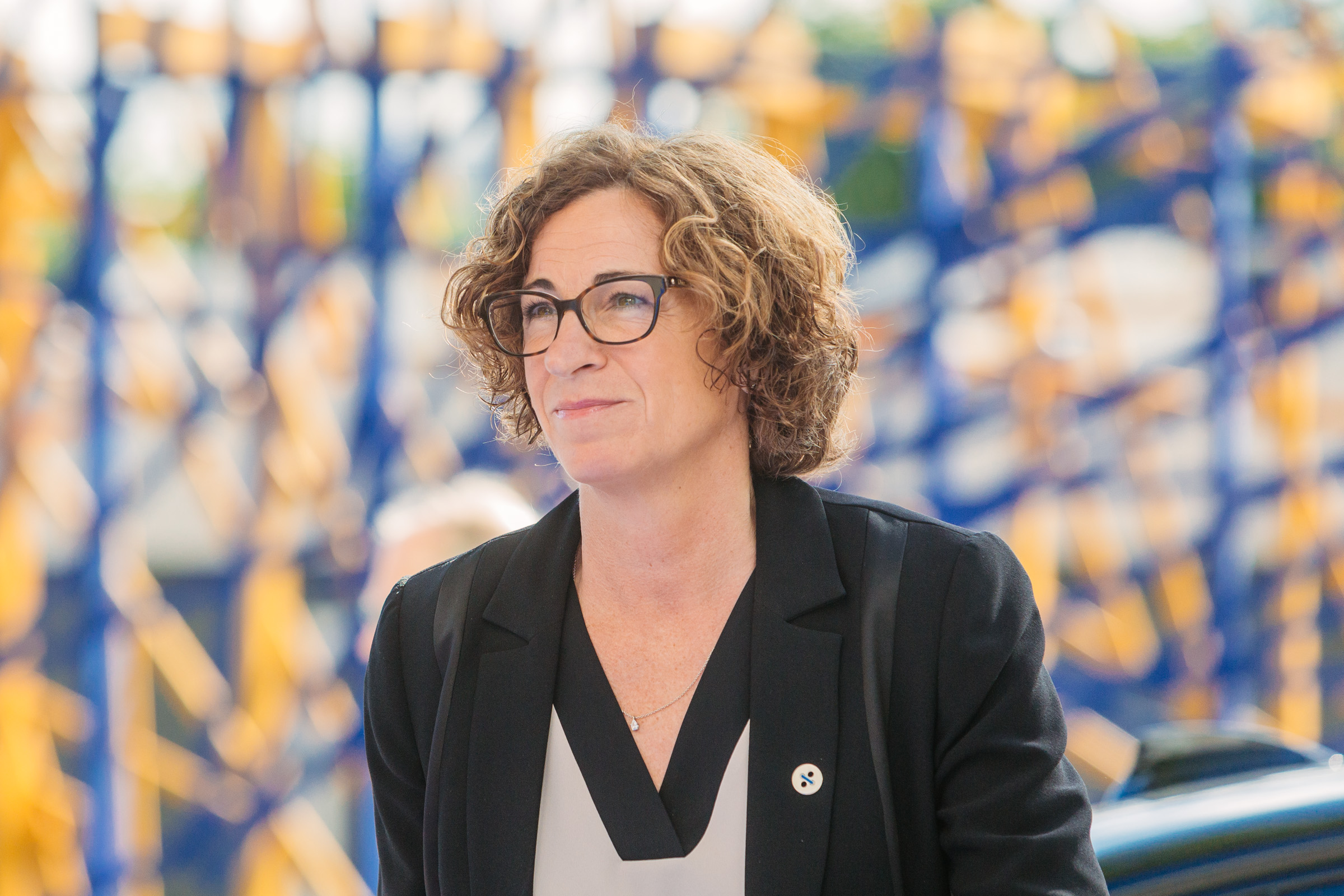
- Born: 2 July 1962 (age 63)
- Occupations: economist, trade unionist, organizational leader, civil servant and politician

Christl Kvam (born 2 July 1962) is a Norwegian nurse, economist, trade unionist, organizational leader, civil servant and politician.

Kvam grew up in Oslo. She first completed nurse education from Ullevål sykepleierskole in Oslo. She then started studying economics, and graduated from the Norwegian School of Economics in 1992. Over a period of ten years she assumed various positions in health administration, and was also board member in various companies and organisations.

From 2002 to 2008 she chaired the trade union centre, Federation of Norwegian Professional Associations. She was then a regional director for the Confederation of Norwegian Enterprise, and was appointed county governor of Oppland in 2014. In 2015 she was appointed to Solberg's Cabinet as a State Secretary in the Ministry of Labour and Social Affairs.

Preceded by Kristin Hille Valla	County Governor of Oppland; 2014–	Succeeded by
