= Alf-Inge Jansen =

Norwegian political scientist and politician

Alf-Inge Jansen (born 30 December 1939) is a Norwegian political scientist and politician for the Liberal Party.

From July to October 1973 he was a State Secretary in the Ministry of Trade as a part of Korvald's Cabinet. He was also a member of the executive committee of Bergen city council from 1979 to 1983.

Jansen was born in Lærdal Municipality. He started his career in the Royal Norwegian Navy, and then studied political science at the University of Oslo. He graduated in 1967, took the MPA degree at Indiana University Bloomington in 1970 and the dr.philos. degree at the University of Bergen in 1989. He has been a visiting scholar at the University of Bath and the University of Warwick, and a part-time researcher at the Institute of Transport Economics.
