= Trygve Haugeland =

Norwegian politician

Minister of the Environment
- In office 18 October 1972 – 5 March 1973
- Prime Minister: Lars Korvald
- Preceded by: Olav Gjærevoll
- Succeeded by: Helga Gitmark

Member of the Norwegian Parliament
- In office 1 January 1958 – 30 September 1961
- Constituency: Vest-Agder

Deputy Member of the Norwegian Parliament
- In office 4 December 1945 – 31 December 1953
- Constituency: Vest-Agder

Personal details
- Born: 18 March 1914 Lyngdal Municipality, Norway
- Died: 10 December 1998 (aged 84)
- Party: Centre

Trygve Haugeland (18 March 1914 – 10 December 1998) was a Norwegian politician for the Centre Party.

== Biography ==
He was born in Lyngdal Municipality. He was elected to the Norwegian Parliament from Vest-Agder in 1958, but was not re-elected in 1961. He had previously served in the position of deputy representative during the terms 1945–1949 and 1950–1953.

He was the Minister of the Environment in 1972–1973 during the cabinet Korvald. He left the post seven months before the tenure of the cabinet ended.

On the local level he was member of the municipal council for Lyngdal Municipality from 1945 to 1955, serving as deputy mayor from 1947.

Political offices
Preceded by Olav Gjærevoll	Norwegian Minister of the Environment; 1972–1973	Succeeded by Helga Gitmark
