= Korvald cabinet =

Government of Norway from 1972 to 1973

Korvald's Cabinet
- Cabinet of Norway

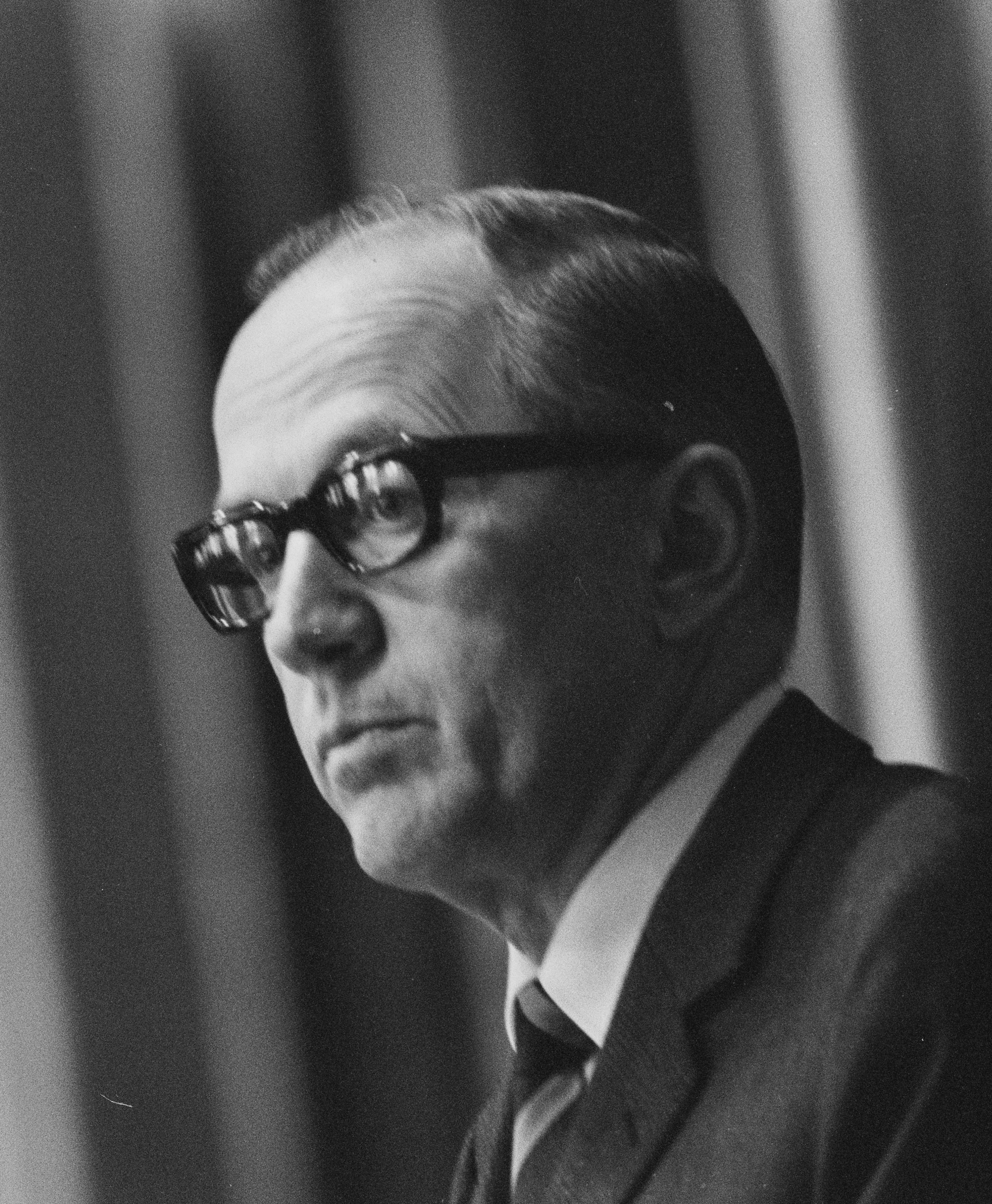
- Date formed: 18 October 1972
- Date dissolved: 16 October 1973

People and organisations
- King: Olav V of Norway
- Prime Minister: Lars Korvald
- Total no. of members: 15
- Member parties: Christian Democratic Party; Centre Party; Liberal Party
- Status in legislature: Coalition (minority)

History
- Election: 1973 parliamentary election
- Legislature term: 1969–1973
- Predecessor: Bratteli's First Cabinet
- Successor: Bratteli's Second Cabinet

Korvald's Cabinet governed Norway between 18 October 1972 and 16 October 1973. The centre cabinet was led by Lars Korvald as Prime Minister and consisted of the Christian Democratic Party, the Centre Party and the Liberal Party.

== Cabinet members ==
Cabinet
Portfolio	Minister	Took office	Left office	Party
Prime Minister	Lars Korvald	18 October 1972	16 October 1973	Christian Democratic
Minister of Foreign Affairs	Dagfinn Vårvik	18 October 1972	16 October 1973	Centre
Minister of Defence	Johan Kleppe	18 October 1972	16 October 1973	Liberal
Minister of Finance and Customs	Jon Ola Norbom	18 October 1972	16 October 1973	Liberal
Minister of Justice and the Police	Petter Mørch Koren	18 October 1972	16 October 1973	Christian Democratic
Minister of Local Government and Labour	Johan Skipnes	18 October 1972	16 October 1973	Christian Democratic
Minister of Social Affairs	Bergfrid Fjose	18 October 1972	16 October 1973	Christian Democratic
Minister of Transport and Communications	John Austrheim	18 October 1972	16 October 1973	Centre
Minister of Trade and Shipping; Minister of Nordic Cooperation	Hallvard Eika	18 October 1972	16 October 1973	Liberal
Minister of Fisheries	Trygve Olsen	18 October 1972	16 October 1973	Centre
Minister of Agriculture	Einar Moxnes	18 October 1972	16 October 1973	Centre
Minister of the Environment	Trygve Haugeland	18 October 1972	5 March 1973	Centre
Minister of the Environment	Helga Gitmark	5 March 1973	16 October 1973	Centre
Minister of Education and Church Affairs	Anton Skulberg	18 October 1972	16 October 1973	Centre
Minister of Government Administration and Consumer Affairs	Eva Kolstad	18 October 1972	16 October 1973	Liberal

== State Secretaries ==
Ministry	State Secretary	Period (Note: Unless otherwise noted, the period was 18 October 1972 - 16 October 1973.)	Party
Office of the Prime Minister	Kjell Magne Bondevik	23 October 1972 - 6 August 1973	Christian Democratic
Office of the Prime Minister	Per Høybråten	30 October 1972 - 7 September 1973	Christian Democratic
Office of the Prime Minister	Harald Synnes	31 October 1972 - 19 August 1973	Christian Democratic
Office of the Prime Minister	Oluf Arntsen	13 August 1973 -	Christian Democratic
Ministry of Foreign Affairs	Tormod Petter Svennevig	30 October 1972 -	Centre
Ministry of Defence	Bjørn Humberset	29 November 1972 -	Liberal
Ministry of Industry and Craft	Carl Rogstad	30 October 1972 -	Liberal
Ministry of Industry and Craft	Håvard Alstadheim	27 October 1972 -	Liberal
Ministry of Local Government and Labour	Oluf Arntsen	30 October 1972 - 13 August 1973	Christian Democratic
Ministry of Social Affairs	Kjell Bjartveit	30 October 1972 -	Christian Democratic
Ministry of Social Affairs	Robert Lillestølen	13 November 1972 - 1 September 1973	Christian Democratic
Ministry of Transport and Communications	Per Magne Arnstad	30 October 1972 -	Centre
Minister of Trade and Shipping	Kåre Gisvoll	6 November 1972 – 15 June 1973	Liberal
Minister of Trade and Shipping	Alf-Inge Jansen	16 July 1973 –	Liberal
Minister of Fisheries	Knut Vartdal	2 November 1972 – 2 July 1973	Centre
Minister of Fisheries	Odd Steinsbø	2 July 1973 –	Centre
Ministry of Agriculture	Arnvid Førde	25 October 1972 -	Centre
Minister of the Environment	Ingvald Godal	1 November 1972 –	Centre
Minister of Government Administration and Consumer Affairs	Viking Mestad	1 November 1972 -	Liberal
Ministry of Church and Education	Gunnar Stålsett	24 October 1972 -	Centre
