= Willy Haugli =

Willy Haugli (2 August 1927 – 12 February 2009) was a Norwegian jurist, university director and police chief.

== Biography ==
Haugli was born in Tromsø, Norway. He was the son of Ivar Stefanussen Haugli (1889-1942) and Jenny Løvberg (1896-1961). He graduated from the Norwegian Police University College (Politiskolen) in 1950. He attended the National Defense College (Forsvarets høgskoleof) from 1967 to 1968.

In 1969, Haugli was appointed university director of the newly established University of Tromsø. He was university director from 1969 to 1978. In 1985 he was appointed district law judge in Tromsø and that same year became Chief of police in Oslo, a position which he held from 1985 until 1994. In retirement, he returned to Tromsø where for some years he served as extraordinary judge in the Hålogaland Court of Appeal.

Police appointments
Preceded by Rolf Solem	Chief of Police of Oslo; 1985-1994	Succeeded by Knut Ragnar Mikkelsen
