= Åsne Havnelid =

Norwegian businessperson and sports official

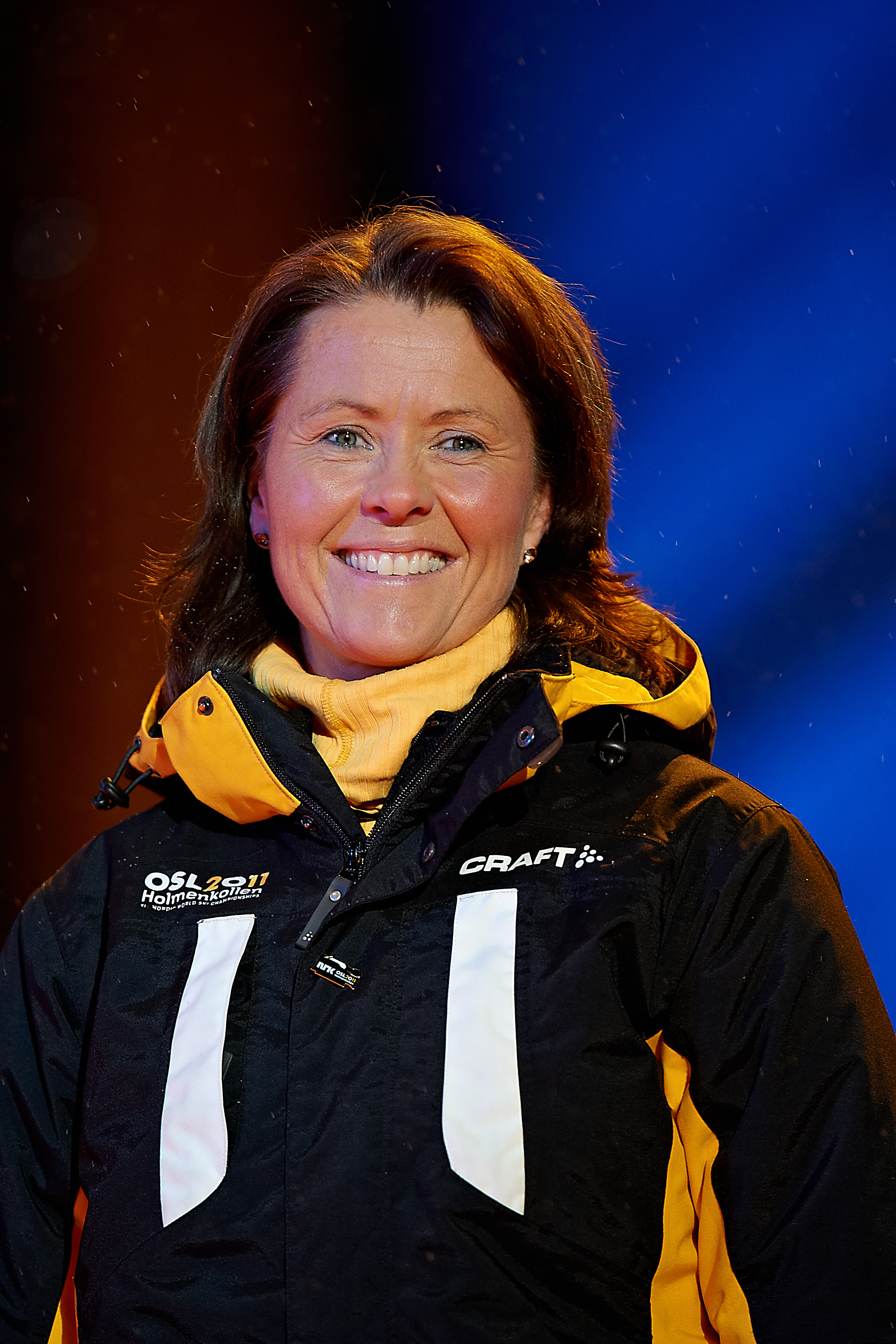
Åsne Havnelid.

Åsne Havnelid (born 28 March 1961) is a Norwegian businessperson and sports official.

She hails from Asker. She holds a bachelor's degree in business administration from the private college Handelsakademiet (now part of BI Norwegian Business School) from 1985, and was hired as a teacher in skiing at the Norwegian School of Elite Sports, a secondary school, in the same year. She served as rector there from 1988 to 1995, and then worked in Olympiatoppen. Here she was the director of Toppidrettssenteret and vice executive of Olympiatoppen under Bjørge Stensbøl. From 2004 to 2007 she worked in SAS Braathens. From 2007 to July 2011 she was the chief executive officer of the FIS Nordic World Ski Championships 2011. Since August 2011 she has been working as secretary general at the Norwegian Red Cross.

In November 2011 she was nominated to "Citizen of Oslo" by the newspaper Aftenposten Aften for her work during FIS Nordic World Ski Championships 2011.

She is married and has one child, and resides at Vollen.

Non-profit organization positions
Preceded by Børge Brende	Secretary General of the Norwegian Red Cross; 2011–	Succeeded by Incumbent
