= Forum for Women and Development =

- Formation: 14 October 1995; 30 years ago
- Type: NGO
- President: Sylvi Graham
- Head of secretariat: Gro Lindstad
- Website: fokuskvinner.no

The Forum for Women and Development (Norwegian: Forum for Kvinner og Utviklingsspørsmål), often known as FOKUS Kvinner, is a Norwegian non-governmental organization aimed at spreading information on women-centered development cooperation and to be a cooperation forum for the Norwegian women's organizations in regard to their development activities in the Global South.

== History and work ==
The Forum for Women and Development has its roots in the 1989 national telethon which supported "women in the third world," and which had been initiated by women's organizations, especially the Norwegian Association for Women's Rights. In 1995 the two organizations that had been established to implement the "Women in the Third World" program were dissolved and replaced by a new permanent organization, the Forum for Women and Development.

The primary goal of the Forum for Women and Development according to its bylaws is to contribute to the improvement of women's social, economic, and political situation in the Global South. The forum only has other organizations as members, and does not have individual members. Member organizations are required to have at least 50 female members and aim to promote women's interests. The forum currently has around 50 women's organizations and women's committees in political parties, trade unions, and solidarity and aid organizations as members. The forum receives financial support from the Norwegian Agency for Development (NORAD) and the Ministry of Foreign Affairs (UD) through framework agreements on development and information activities.

The political leadership, the executive board, is elected by the member organizations. Since 2017, Sylvi Graham is President of the forum. The forum has a small secretariat in Oslo which supports the executive board in their work. The head of the secretariat is Gro Lindstad.

In 2005, the forum was the beneficiary of the Norwegian national television's telethon, whose funds have gone to combating violence against women. In 2014, the main women's rights organizations in Norway additionally founded the Norwegian Women's Lobby as an umbrella organization for the Norwegian women's movement with a broader focus than the Global South. Most of its member organizations also participate in the Forum for Women and Development, but the organizations have a different focus.

In 2018 the Forum for Women and Development and five other key NGOs organized the customary torchlight parade in Oslo in honor of that year's Nobel Peace Prize laureates, Denis Mukwege and Nadia Murad, who were awarded the prize for their work to end the use of sexual violence as a weapon of war.

== Presidents ==
- Olaug Ubøe 1995–?
- Ingrid Wisløff Jæger ca. 2005
- Gerd Louise Molvig 2006–2010
- Ågot Valle 2010–2012
- Rina Mariann Hansen 2012–2014
- Guro Fjellanger 2014–2016
- Elin Ranum 2016–2017
- Sylvi Graham 2017–

== See also ==
- Norwegian Women's Lobby, the principal umbrella organization for women's organizations in Norway
