= 2006 in Norway =

- Centuries: 19th; 20th; 21st
- Decades: 1980s; 1990s; 2000s; 2010s; 2020s
- See also: List of years in Norway

Events in the year 2006 in Norway.

== Incumbents ==
- Monarch: Harald V.
- President of the Storting: Thorbjørn Jagland
- Prime Minister: Jens Stoltenberg

== Events ==
=== January ===
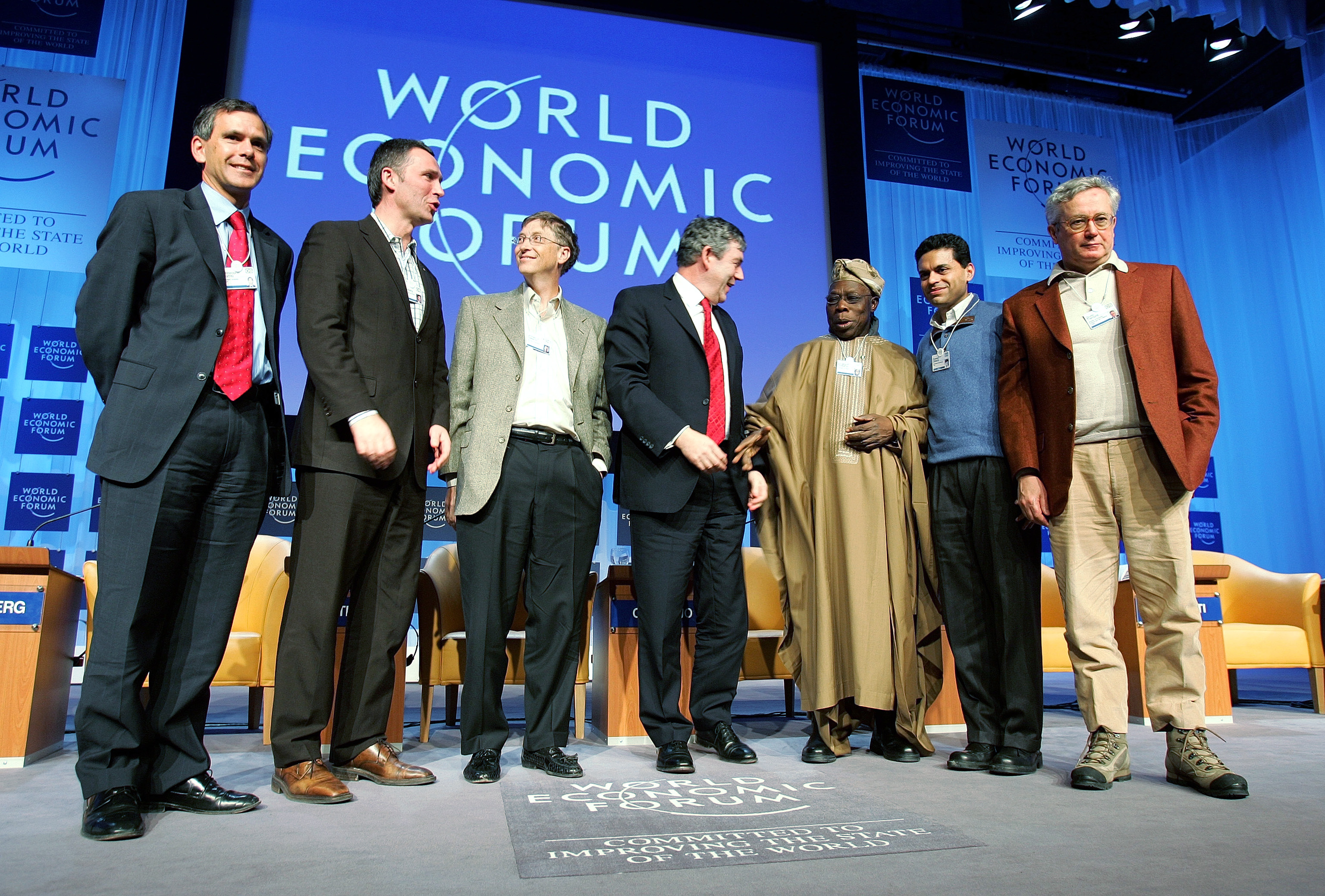
Christopher J. L. Murray, Jens Stoltenberg, Bill Gates, Gordon Brown, Olusegun Obasanjo, Fareed Zakaria and Giulio Tremonti during the World Economic Forum (2006).

- 10 January – The Christian newspaper Magazinet publishes caricatures of the Muhammed.
- 22 January – Islamic scholars threaten Denmark and Norway with boycotts after the publication of the Muhammed cartoons.

=== February ===
- 20 February – Agreement is reached between Denmark and Norway about the border between Svalbard and Greenland.

=== March ===
- 4 March – Prince Sverre Magnus of Norway is baptized in Slottskapellet in Oslo.
- 20 March – The Norwegian Food Safety Authority reports that Gilde is responsible for an outbreak of e. coli in Norway that has led to the death of one child and 13 hospitalized children.

=== May ===
- 6 May – The Progress Party elects Siv Jensen as their new leader.
- 12 May – An Al-Qaida video on the internet encourages Muslims to attack Denmark, Norway and France for the publication of cartoons of Muhammed.
- 25 May – The FIS Nordic World Ski Championships 2011 is awarded to Oslo during the congress of the International Ski Federation in Faro, Portugal.

=== June ===
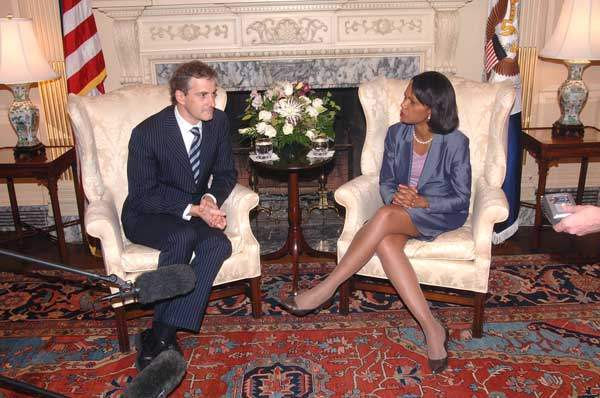
U.S. Secretary of State Condoleezza Rice held a bilateral meeting with Norwegian Foreign Minister Jonas Gahr Støre in Washington, D.C., on 15 June 2006.

- 3 June – Salmonella is found in First Price salami, which in recent weeks has infected 35 and possibly caused one death.
- 7 June – A meteorite impact event occurs in northern Troms County, Norway. Locals compare the resultant explosion to the nuclear explosion at Hiroshima. The impact location was apparently desolate, and no structural damage or casualties are reported.
- 10 June – A man fires several shots at police in Herøy Municipality (Møre og Romsdal) after a family quarrel. The man later takes his own life.
- 19 June – The decision is made to build the Svalbard Global Seed Vault.

=== July ===
- 1 July – The Norwegian Labour and Welfare Administration (NAV) is established. This is one of the biggest changes in the history of Norwegian welfare aid.

=== August ===
- 24 August – Fritz Moen is acquitted of murder charges.
- 31 August – The Edvard Munch paintings The Scream and Madonna are found by the police. The paintings were stolen on 22 August 2004.

=== September ===
- 7 September – Death of Eugene Ejike Obiora: Eugene Ejike Obiora, a naturalized Norwegian citizen originally from Nigeria who was arrested at a social services office while complaining against being denied social aid, dies at the hands of arresting police officers in Trondheim. The case made headlines locally and nationally, with accusations of unnecessary use of force and racism leveled at the local police, as well as uproar in African societies in Norway.

=== October ===
- 10 October – Atlantic Airways Flight 670, a BAe 146, slides off the runway at Stord Airport, Norway, killing four of the 16 people on board.
- 13 October – Solveig Fiske is appointed bishop of the Diocese of Hamar.

=== December ===
- December – Norsk Hydro reveals a proposal to merge its oil business with compatriate oil and gas company Statoil. Gaining approval from both the EU and the Storting, the merger is completed by 1 October 2007.

=== Undated ===
- The service station chain HydroTexaco is sold to Reitangruppen.

== Popular culture ==
=== Sports ===
- 23 July – 2006 Tour de France is won by Thor Hushovd.
- 17 December – Norway wins the 2006 European Women's Handball Championship in Sweden.
- The 2006 World Powerlifting Championships are held in Stavanger.

=== Music ===
- Norway in the Eurovision Song Contest 2006

=== Film ===
- 21 April – Free Jimmy, directed by Christopher Nielsen, was released in Norway.
- 26 May – The Bothersome Man, directed by Jens Lien, was released in Norway.
- 25 August – Uro, directed by Stefan Faldbakken, was released in Norway. It had earlier, in May, been screened in the Un Certain Regard section at the 2006 Cannes Film Festival.
- 8 September – Reprise, directed by Joachim Trier, was released in Norway. The film was originally screened at the Karlovy Vary International Film Festival in July, where it was awarded the Crystal Globe Best Director Award.
- 15 September – Sons, directed by Erik Richter Strand, was released in Norway.
- 13 October – Cold Prey, directed by Roar Uthaug, was released in Norway. The film was previously screened at the Karlovy Vary International Film Festival in June.
- 3 November – The Art of Negative Thinking, directed by Bård Breien, was released in Norway. The film was screened at the Karlovy Vary International Film Festival in July 2007, where Breien was awarded the Crystal Globe Best Director Award.

== Births ==
- 10 January – Angelina Jordan, singer
- 10 March – Kyle Alessandro, singer

== Notable deaths ==
=== January ===
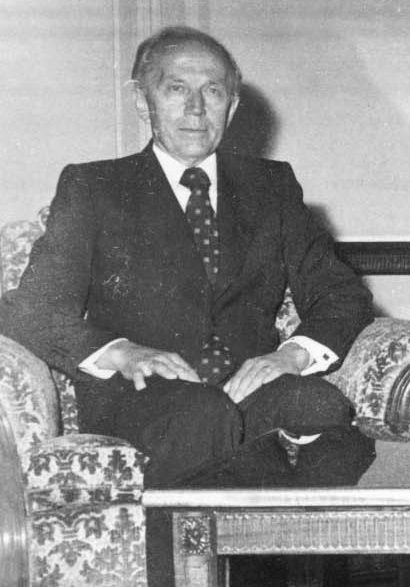
Lars Korvald

- 6 January – Lars Vaage, politician (born 1928).
- 10 January – Thor Knudsen, politician (born 1927).
- 12 January – Harald Emil Hauge, physician and civil servant (born 1936).
- 15 January – Tore Jørgen Hanisch, economic historian (born 1945).
- 16 January –
  - Finn Brudevold, odontologist (born 1910, died in the US).
  - Sigurd Engelstad, genealogist and archivist (born 1914).
- 17 January – Astri Rynning, judge and politician (born 1915).
- 20 January – Einar Hole Moxnes, politician (born 1921).
- 21 January –
  - Sigurd Lunde, bishop (born 1916).
  - Finn Thrana, politician (born 1915).
- 23 January –
  - Tore Gjelsvik, resistance member and geologist (born 1916).
  - Olga Marie Mikalsen, novelty singer (born 1915, died in Spain).

=== February ===
- 3 February – Halvdan Ljøsne, painter (born 1929).
- 7 February –
  - Thoralf Gilbrant, Pentecostal leader (born 1919).
  - Kristina Hjartåker, victim of the 2005 Hatlestad Slide
  - Harald Noreng, literary historian and lexicographer (born 1913).
- 9 February – Anders Forsdahl, physician (born 1930).
- 13 February – Kristian Trægde, meteorologist (born 1915).
- 15 February – Ragnar Kvam, writer (born 1917, died in Denmark).
- 17 February – Knut Moe, novelist (born 1909).
- 19 February – Godtfred Holmvang, decathlete and skier (born 1917, died in Canada).
- 24 February – Adolf Relling, furniture designer (born 1913).
- 28 February –
  - Jan Brøgger, social anthropologist and psychologist (born 1936).
  - Dagfinn Hjertenes, politician (born 1943).

=== March ===
- 1 March – Reidar Liaklev, speed skater (born 1917).
- 6 March – Gunnar Halvorsen, politician (born 1945).
- 7 March – Eva Sletto, actress (born 1912).
- 8 March – Johan H. Grimstad, composer and conductor (born 1924).
- 9 March – Geir Ivarsøy, tech company founder (born 1957).
- 13 March – Arne Dørumsgaard, composer (born 1921).
- 14 March – Terje Dalby, sports anchor (born 1944).
- 15 March – Einar Forsbak, banker (born 1937).
- 17 March – Ivar Grimstad, principal and writer (born 1922).
- 18 March –
  - Julius Fure, politician (born 1931).
  - Kjell H. Halvorsen, diplomat (born 1946).
- 20 March –
  - Egil Teige, television presenter (born 1941).
  - Ulf Torgersen, political scientist (born 1931).
- 26 March –
  - Kristoffer Lepsøe, rower (born 1922).
  - Nils Spjeldnæs, geologist (born 1926).

=== April ===
- 6 April – Alf Ihlen, industrialist (born 1900).
- 12 April – Sally Olsen, missionary (born 1912, died in Puerto Rico).
- 18 April – Eivind Skabo, sprint canoer (born 1916).
- 22 April – Magnar Norderhaug, zoologist and ecologist (born 1939)
- 26 April – Helmer Hofset, architect (born 1920).
- 28 April – Rigmor Holmsen, ethnologist (born 1911).
- 29 April – Bjørn Aamodt, poet (born 1944).
- 30 April – Sverre Bergh, spy in Nazi Germany during World War II (born 1920, died in the US)

=== May ===
- 2 May – Kaare Hammer, racewalker (born 1918).
- 8 May – Sigmund Lystrup, priest and painter (born 1909).
- 9 May – Per Knudsen, footballer (born 1930).
- 10 May – Per Viksjø, architect (born 1938).
- 11 May – Aksel Kloster, politician (born 1948).
- 12 May – Helge Øieren, politician (born 1924).
- 14 May – Eva Norvind, writer, filmmaker, sexologist and actress (born 1944, died in Mexico).
- 20 May – Nic Stene, speed skater (born 1921).
- 21 May – Inger Louise Valle, politician (born 1921).
- 24 May – Per Maltby, astronomer (born 1932).
- 28 May – Thorleif Schjelderup, ski jumper and author (born 1920).
- 30 May –
  - Einar Riis, resistance member and businessperson (born 1922).
  - Bjørn Vade, athlete (born 1922).

=== June ===
- 1 June – Kristian Ottosen, writer and civil servant (born 1921).
- 1 June – Hans Marius Stormoen, jazz bassist (born 1943).
- 6 June –
  - Sverre Krogh, politician (born 1921).
  - Reimund Kvideland, folklorist (born 1935).
- 7 June – Kåre Kolås, politician (born 1917).
- 10 June – Otto Grieg Tidemand, ship-owner and politician (born 1921).
- 12 June – Freddy Kristoffersen, accordionist (born 1944).
- 14 June – Knut Wigert, actor (born 1916).
- 21 June – Rolf Stigersand, diver (born 1916).
- 23 June –
  - Knut Haus, politician (born 1915).
  - Gunnar Skaug, politician (born 1940).
- 24 June – Børre Falkum-Hansen, sailor (born 1919).
- 30 June – Bjarne Johannes Hope, civil servant (born 1944).

=== July ===
- 4 July – Lars Korvald, Prime Minister (born 1916).
- 5 July – Kari Schanke, politician (born 1922).
- 8 July – Tor Torkildsen, novelist (born 1932).
- 12 July – Jo Ørjasæter, translator and critic (born 1925).
- 17 July – Ingar Tanum, bookseller (born 1924).
- 19 July – Odd With, politician (born 1921).
- 26 July –
  - Rolf Arthur Hansen, politician (born 1920).
  - Alf Opheim, alpine skier (born 1920).
- 27 July – Bjørn Morisse, cartoonist and musician (born 1944).
- 28 July – Rut Brandt, writer and First Lady of Germany (born 1920)

=== August ===
- 3 August – Åslaug Linge Sunde, politician (born 1917).
- 5 August – Odmund J. Møllerop, archaeologist (born 1922).
- 7 August – Kristoffer Fotland, missionary and physician (born 1905).
- 8 August – Christian Borchsenius, judge (born 1927).
- 9 August – Arne Heli, activist (born 1924).
- 13 August –
  - Kristin Berglund, blues musician (born 1953).
  - Paul Breiehagen, politician (born 1922).
- 21 August –
  - Tore Haaland, painter (born 1918).
  - Jon Lilletun, politician (born 1945).
- 26 August – Ole Arnfinn Silset, politician (born 1921).
- 27 August – Arvid Udbjørg, printmaker (born 1928).
- 29 August – Olav Ottersen, author (born 1929, died in Spain).

=== September ===
- 3 September –
  - Eva Knardahl, pianist (born 1927).
  - Lasse Myrvold, musician (born 1953).
- 4 September –
  - Ingrid Bjoner, opera singer (born 1927).
  - Annelise Knudtzon, textile artist (born 1914).
- 7 September- Eugene Ejike Obiora, died during police arrest (born 1958)
- 10 September – Arne Hoel, ski jumper (born 1927).
- 15 September – Asbjørn Ystad, illustrator (born 1944).
- 21 September – Ella Holm Bull, teacher and politician (born 1929).
- 24 September – Per Stavem, shot putter and discus thrower (born 1926)
- 28 September – Jan Werner Danielsen, singer (born 1976).

=== October ===
- 2 October – Asbjørn Herteig, archeologist (born 1919).
- 8 October – John Egil Grieg, diplomat (born 1928).
- 12 October – Bjørn Lyng, industrialist (born 1925, died in Spain).
- 28 October – Kjell Magne Fredheim, politician (born 1928).
- 29 October – Roland Lengauer, sculptor (born 1941).
- 30 October –
  - Jens Christian Hauge, resistance member and politician (born 1915).
  - Aud Schønemann, actress (born 1922).
- 31 October – Haakon Dahlstrøm, Salvationist and hymn writer (born 1907).

=== November ===
- 2 November – Gudmund Elvestad, goldsmith (born 1932).
- 3 November – Reidar Berge, sculptor (born 1922).
- 4 November – Torolf Elster, journalist, editor and author (born 1911).
- 8 November – Ernst Sejersted Selmer, mathematician (born 1920).
- 11 November – Erling Utnem, bishop (born 1920).
- 14 November –
  - Eystein Sandnes, ceramic and glass designer (born 1927).
  - Carl Alexander Wendt, Governor of Svalbard (born 1923).
- 17 November – Astri Rynning, politician (born 1915).
- 19 November – Torbjørn Lie, businessperson and politician (born 1943).
- 20 November – Arne Walentin, scenographer (born 1915).
- 21 November – Svein Erik Bakke, entrepreneur (born 1947)
- 23 November – Arvid Nergård, bishop (born 1923).
- 24 November – Nils Are Øritsland, polar researcher (born 1939).
- 25 November – Kjell Kopstad, ski jumper (born 1934).
- 28 November – Thorleif Lintrup Paus, lawyer and diplomat (born 1912).
- 29 November –
  - Ragnhild Sundby, zoologist (born 1922).
  - Hjelm Waage Thurn-Basberg, resistance member (born 1917).

=== December ===
- 2 December – Nøste Kendzior, translator and writer (born 1950).
- 4 December – Sigrid Utkilen, politician (born 1916).
- 6 December – Otto Øgrim, physicist and author (born 1913).
- 14 December – Finn Seyersted, legal scholar (born 1915).
- 15 December – Svein Wickstrøm, actor (born 1936).
- 17 December –
  - Peter Wilhelm Bøckman, theologian (born 1927).
  - Elsa Brita Marcussen, film critic (born 1919).
- 23 December – Arne Sandnes, politician (born 1925).
- 24 December – Kenneth Sivertsen, musician (born 1961).
- 25 December –
  - Hallvard Kvåle, musician and label owner (born 1941).
  - Ingerid Vardund, actress (born 1927).
- 26 December – Ivar Formo, skier and orienteer (born 1951).
- 31 December – Reidar Strømdahl, politician (born 1913).
