= 1933 in Norway =

- Centuries: 18th; 19th; 20th; 21st
- Decades: 1910s; 1920s; 1930s; 1940s; 1950s
- See also: List of years in Norway

Events in the year 1933 in Norway.

== Incumbents ==
- Monarch – Haakon VII.
- Prime Minister – Jens Hundseid until 3 March, then Johan Ludwig Mowinckel

== Events ==
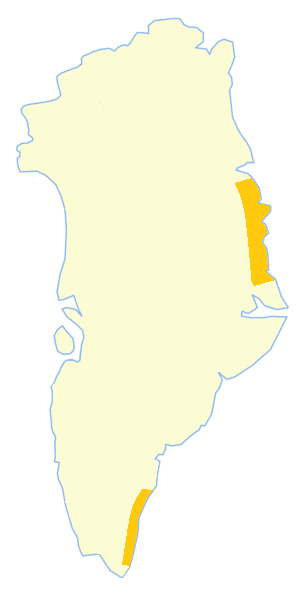
Territories of Eastern Greenland occupied by Norway until the 1933 Permanent Court of International Justice resolution.

- 3 March – Johan Ludwig Mowinckel becomes new prime minister.
- 17 May – Vidkun Quisling and Johan Bernhard Hjort establish the Norwegian fascist party "Nasjonal Samling" ("National Unity")
- 1 July – The Norwegian Broadcasting Corporation (NRK) is founded.
- 24 July – The Parliament grants the Norwegian Broadcasting Corporation (NRK) monopoly on radio broadcasting in Norway.
- 4 September - The Christian Democratic Party is founded as a local party in Hordaland og gets one representative in the parliamentary election.
- 5 September - Norway and Denmark agreed to settle their dispute over Eastern Greenland (Erik the Red's Land and King Frederick VI Coast) in what became known as the "Greenland case" (Grønlandssaken) at the Permanent Court of International Justice. Norway lost and after the ruling it abandoned its claims.
- 16 October – The 1933 Parliamentary election takes place.

== Popular culture ==
=== Literature ===
- The Knut Hamsund novel Men Livet lever Volume 1 & 2 (The Road Leads On), was published.
- En flyktning krysser sitt spor (A Fugitive Crosses His Tracks) by Aksel Sandemose was published.

== Notable births ==
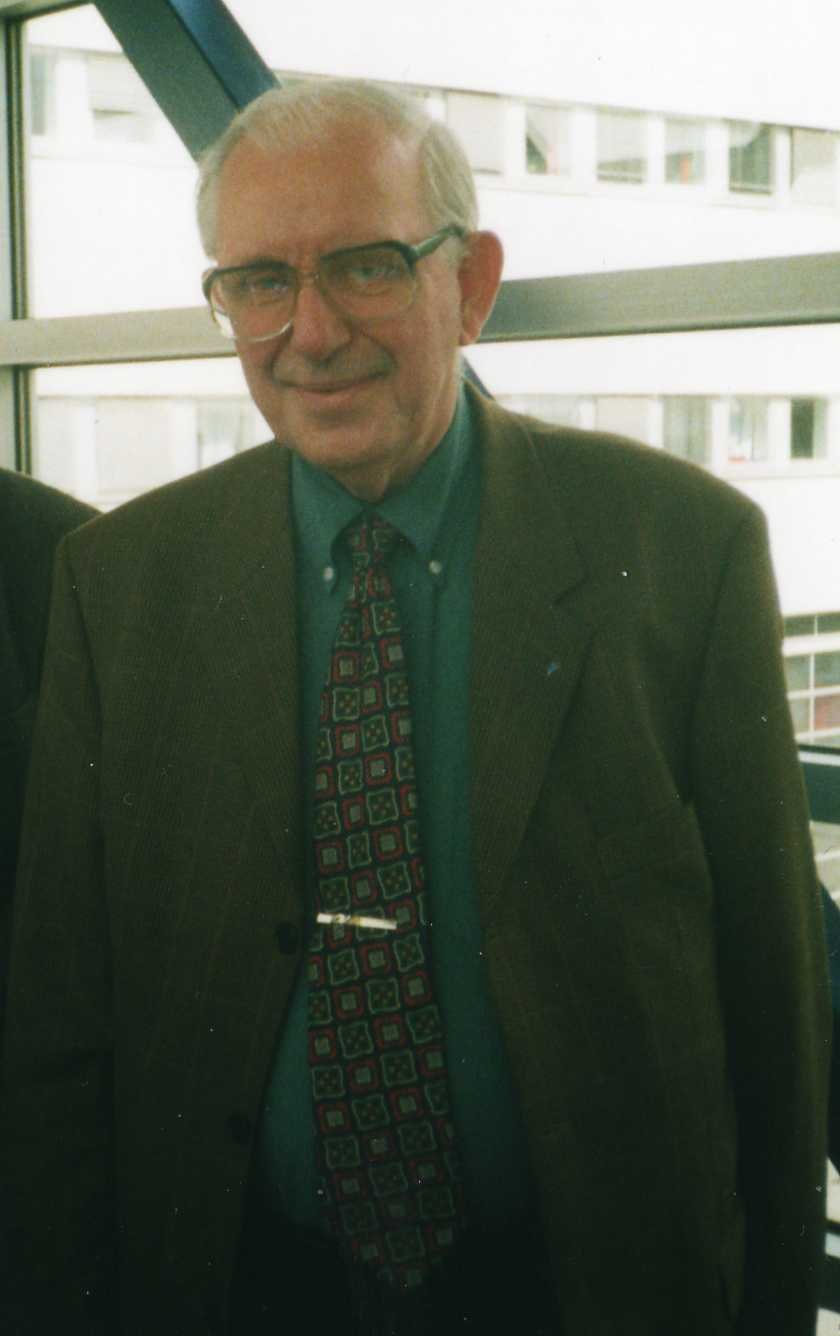
Herbjørn Sørebø

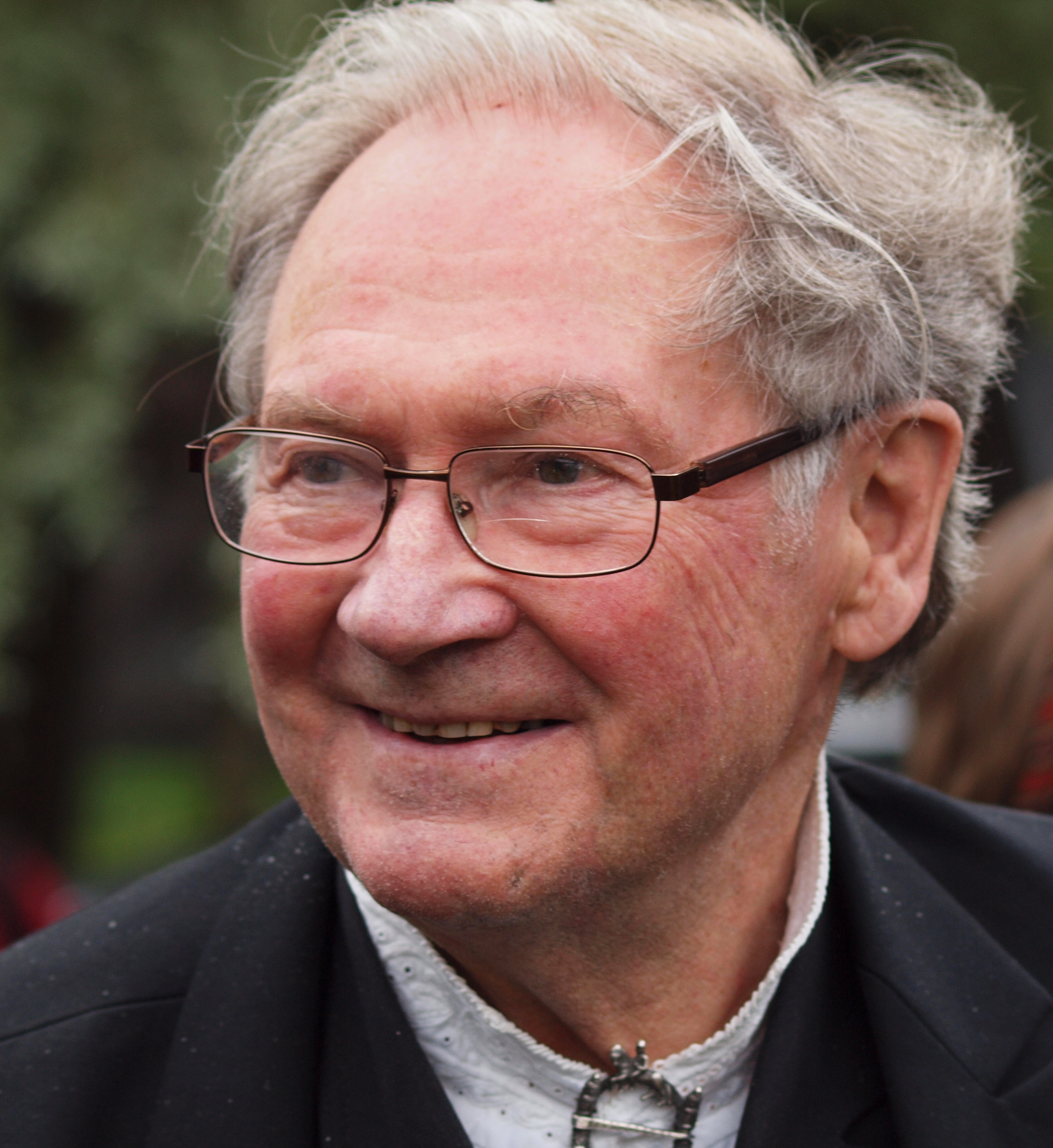
Hauk Buen

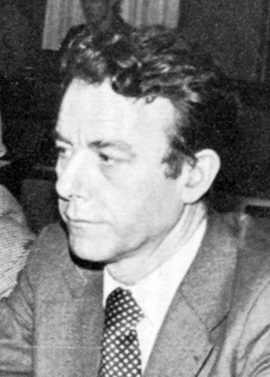
Reiulf Steen

- 7 January – Bjarne Lingås, boxer (died 2011)
- 8 January – Anne Petrea Vik, politician and Minister
- 10 January – Stein Haugen, discus thrower (died 2008)
- 19 February – Kåre Øvregard, politician
- 4 March – Unni Bernhoft, actress.
- 11 March – Henrik J. Lisæth, politician
- 25 March – Bjørn Pedersen, chemist (died 2024).
- 29 March – Edvard Grimstad, politician (died 2014)
- 4 April – Ola Byrknes, politician (died 2011)
- 8 April – Tore Lindbekk, sociologist and politician (died 2017)
- 10 April – Oddlaug Vereide, politician (died 2021).
- 12 April – Ingvar Lars Helle, politician (died 2003)
- 15 April – Kjell Svindland, politician (died 2025).
- 18 April – Leif Eldring, judge and civil servant (died 1994)
- 21 April – Nils Aas, sculptor (died 2004)
- 25 April – Herbjørn Sørebø, media personality (died 2003).
- 29 April – Jarle Høysæter, journalist (died 2013)
- 30 April – Magne Bleness, actor and theatre director (died 1992).
- 10 May – Reidar Engell Olsen, politician (died 2016)
- 11 May – Hauk Buen, hardingfele fiddler and fiddle maker (died 2021).
- 11 May – Jan Einar Greve, lawyer (died 2022)
- 2 June – Åse Hiorth Lervik, literary researcher (died 1997)
- 5 June – Per Ung, sculptor (died 2013)
- 20 June – Knut Engdahl, politician
- 12 July – Ingrid Eide, sociologist, United Nations official and politician
- 14 July – Lars Monrad Krohn, engineer and entrepreneur
- 24 July – Arne Hamarsland, middle-distance runner
- 25 July – Per Digerud, cyclist (died 1988).
- 6 August – Eva R. Finstad, politician (died 1998)
- 12 August – Einar Knut Holm, politician (died 2021)
- 16 August – Reiulf Steen, politician (died 2014)
- 16 August – Dagfinn Bakke, painter, illustrator and graphical artist.(died 2019)
- 19 August – Asmund Bjørken, folk musician (d. 2018)
- 27 August - Agnes Nygaard Haug, judge
- 6 September – Bjørg Skjælaaen, figure skater (died 2019).
- 10 October - Ragnar Udjus, media personality and politician
- 31 October - Sverre Stensheim, cross country skier (died 2022)
- 1 November - Gunvor Krogsæter, politician
- 6 November - Knut Johannesen, speed skater and double Olympic gold medallist
- 6 November – Anne-Lise Seip, historian and politician
- 8 November – Eli Kristiansen, politician
- 9 November – Egil Danielsen, javelin thrower and Olympic gold medallist (died 2019)
- 16 November – Johan Henrik Schreiner, historian (died 2022)
- 19 December – Kolbein Falkeid, poet (died 2021)
- 28 December – Inger Bjørnbakken, alpine skier and World Champion (died 2021)
- 31 December – Sigurd Osberg, bishop

=== Full date unknown ===
- Per Maltby, astronomer (died 2006)

== Notable deaths ==
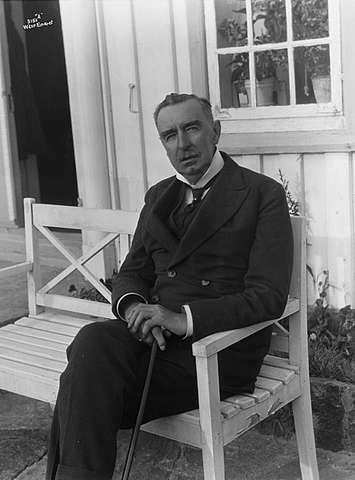
Vilhelm Krag in 1929

- 7 February – Vetle Vislie, educationalist and writer (born 1858)
- 1 March – Fredrik Georg Gade, physician (born 1855)
- 2 April – Martinus Lørdahl, businessperson, multi sports competitor and sports administrator (born 1873).
- 29 May – Johan Henrik Rye Holmboe, businessperson, politician and Minister (born 1863)
- 20 May – Gunder Anton Johannesen Jahren, politician and Minister (born 1858)
- 7 June – Edvard Hans Hoff, politician and Minister (born 1838)
- 29 June – Olaf Bull, poet (born 1883)
- 9 July – Rolfine Absalonsen, actress (born 1864)
- 10 July – Vilhelm Krag, author (born 1871)
- 17 July – Anders Buen, typographer, newspaper editor, trade unionist and politician (born 1864)
- 22 July – Johan Bøgh, museum director and art historian (born 1848)
- 13 August – Birger Stuevold-Hansen, politician and Minister (born 1870)
- 26 October – Erik Enge, politician and Minister (born 1852)
- 28 October – Magne Johnsen Rongved, politician (born 1858)
- 29 November – Nikka Vonen, educator, folklorist and author (b. 1836).

=== Full date unknown ===
- Johan Arndt, politician (born 1876)
- Peter Karl Holmesland, jurist and politician (born 1866)
