= Thorkild =

Thorkild may refer to:

- Thorkild Fjeldsted (1740–1796), Icelandic lawyer, Prime Minister of the Faroe Islands from 1769 to 1772
- Thorkild Grosbøll (1948–2020), parish priest in the Church of Denmark
- Thorkild Hansen (1927–1989), Danish novelist known for his Slave Trilogy
- Thorkild Jacobsen (1904–1993), renowned historian specialising in Assyriology and Sumerian literature
- Thorkild Roose (1874 – 1961), Danish actor and theatre director
- Niels Thorkild Rovsing (1862–1927), Danish surgeon remembered for describing Rovsing's sign
- Thorkild Simonsen (1926–2022), Danish politician and member of the Social Democrats
- Svenn Thorkild Stray or Svenn Stray (1922–2012), Norwegian politician, foreign minister of Norway
- Thorkild Thyrring (born 1946), Danish auto racing driver

== See also ==
- Thorkildsen
- Torkild
- Torkildsen
- Thorkel
- Torkil
