= Guttormsson =

Guttormsson is a Nordic surname. Notable people with this surname include:

- Bård Guttormsson (c. 1150–1194), medieval Norwegian nobleman
- Jón Guttormsson Skráveifa (died 1361), governor of Iceland (1357–1360)
- Andras Guttormsson (c. 1490–1544), First Minister of the Faroe Islands (1531–1544)
- Ísak Guttormsson, First Minister of the Faroe Islands (1583–1588)
- Guttormur J. Guttormsson (1878-1966), Icelandic Canadian playwright and poet
- Hjörleifur Guttormsson (born 1935), Icelandic politician
