= Thorkildsen =

Thorkildsen may refer to:

- Andreas Thorkildsen (born 1982), Norwegian javelin thrower, born in Kristiansand
- Anton Thorkildsen Omholt (1861–1925), the Norwegian Minister of Finance 1913-1920
- Frederik Thorkildsen Wexschall (1798–1845), Danish classic composer and violinist
- Inga Marte Thorkildsen (born 1976), Norwegian politician for the Socialist Left Party
- Theis Jacob Thorkildsen Lundegaard or Teis Lundegaard (1774–1856), Norwegian farmer and politician

== See also ==
- Thorkelson
- Thorkildsen-Mather Borax Company
- Thorkild
- Torkelsen
- Torkildsen
- Therkildsen
