= Jógvan =

- Gender: Male
- Language: Faroese

Origin
- Region of origin: Faroe Islands

Jógvan is a Faroese masculine given name. People bearing the name Jógvan include:

- Jógvan Hansen (born 1978), Faroese singer and guitar player
- Jógvan Heinason (1541–1602), first Minister of the Faroe Islands
- Jógvan Justinusson (????-16???), former Prime Minister of the Faroe Islands
- Jógvan Isaksen (born 1950), Faroese writer and literary historian
- Jógvan á Lakjuni (born 1952), Faroese politician, composer and teacher
- Jógvan Martin Olsen (born 1961), Faroese footballer, coach and manager
- Jógvan Poulsen (16??-16??), former Prime Minister of the Faroe Islands
- Jógvan Sundstein (born 1933), Faroese politician
