= Therkildsen =

Therkildsen is a predominantly Danish patronymic surname from the name Therkild. People bearing the name include:

- Hans Michael Therkildsen (1850–1925), Danish painter
- Mogens Therkildsen (born 1940), Danish footballer
- Morten Therkildsen (born 1983), Danish racing cyclist
- Peter Therkildsen (born 1998), Danish footballer
- Rasmus Therkildsen (born 1991), Danish singer

== See also ==
- Thorkildsen
- Torkelsen
- Torkildsen
