= Hveding =

Hveding is a Norwegian surname. Notable people with the surname include:

- Jacob Hveding (fl. 1772–1786), Prime Minister of the Faroe Islands
- Vidkunn Hveding (1921–2001), Norwegian politician
