= Absalonsen =

Absalonsen is a surname. Notable people with the surname include:

- Johan Absalonsen (born 1985), Danish footballer
- Rolfine Absalonsen (1864–1933), Norwegian actress
