= Krogsæter =

Krogsæter is a surname. Notable people with the surname include:

- André Krogsæter (born 1961), Norwegian footballer
- Gunvor Krogsæter (born 1933), Norwegian politician
