= Hans Jákupsson Debes =

Lawman of the Faroe Islands (1723–1769)

Lawman of the Faroe Islands
- In office 1752–1769
- Preceded by: Sámal Pætursson Lamhauge
- Succeeded by: Thorkild Fjeldsted

Personal details
- Born: 1723 Oyri, Faroe Islands
- Died: 1769 (aged 45–46)
- Relations: Sámal Pætursson Lamhauge (father-in-law)

Hans Jákupsson Debes (1723–1769) was Lawman of the Faroe Islands from 1752 to 1769.

Hans Jákupsson came from Oyri and was married to the daughter of lawman Sámal Pætursson Lamhauge, from whom he took over as lawman.

Political offices
Preceded by Sámal Pætursson Lamhauge	Prime Minister of the Faroe Islands; 1752-1769	Succeeded by Thorkild Fjeldsted
