= Sámal Pætursson Lamhauge =

Prime Minister of the Faroe Islands (died 1752)

Lawman of the Faroe Islands
- In office 1706–1752
- Preceded by: Jóhan Hendrik Weyhe
- Succeeded by: Hans Jákupsson Debes

Personal details
- Died: 1752 Lamba, Faroe Islands
- Relations: Jóhan Hendrik Weyhe (father-in-law); Hans Jákupsson Debes (son-in-law)

Sámal Pætursson Lamhauge (died 1752 in Lamba) was Lawman of the Faroe Islands from 1706 to 1752.

Lamhauge was the father-in-law of Hans Jákupsson Debes, who followed him in the post.

He was the longest serving lawman of the Faroe Islands, serving for 46 years.

Political offices
Preceded by Jóhan Hendrik Weyhe	Prime Minister of the Faroe Islands; 1706–1752	Succeeded by Hans Jákupsson Debes
