= Jóhan Hendrik Weyhe =

Prime Minister of the Faroe Islands

Tummas Símunarson

Lawman of the Faroe Islands
- In office 1679–1706
- Preceded by: Jákup Jógvansson
- Succeeded by: Sámal Pætursson Lamhauge

Personal details
- Relations: Sámal Pætursson Lamhauge (son-in-law)
- Occupation: Landowner

Jóhan Hendrik Weyhe was Lawman of the Faroe Islands from 1679 to 1706.

Jóhan Hendrik Weyhe was Faroese, and the largest land owner in the Faroe Islands. He was also the father-in-law of Lawman Sámal Pætursson Lamhauge, who took over from him in the post.

Political offices
Preceded by Jákup Jógvansson	Prime Minister of the Faroe Islands; 1679–1706	Succeeded by Sámal Pætursson Lamhauge
