= Jákup Jógvansson =

Prime Minister of the Faroe Islands

Lawman of the Faroe Islands
- In office 1677–1679
- Preceded by: Jógvan Poulsen
- Succeeded by: Jóhan Hendrik Weyhe

Personal details
- Parent: Jógvan Poulsen (father)
- Occupation: Sysselmann, farmer

Jákup Jógvansson was Lawman of the Faroe Islands from 1677 to 1679.

Jákup Jógvansson was Faroese, and son of former Lawman Jógvan Poulsen. Jákup had also been a sysselmann (sheriff) on Sandoy. He lived and worked on the farm of Dalsgarður in Skálavík.

Political offices
Preceded by Jógvan Poulsen	Lawman of the Faroe Islands; 1677-1679	Succeeded by Jóhan Hendrik Weyhe
