= Jørgen Frantz Hammershaimb =

Prime Minister of the Faroe Islands (1767–1820)

Lawman of the Faroe Islands
- In office 1805–1816
- Preceded by: Johan Michael Lund
- Succeeded by: Position abolished

Personal details
- Born: 6 July 1767
- Died: 24 May 1820 (aged 52)
- Children: Venceslaus Ulricus Hammershaimb (son)
- Occupation: Lawyer

Jørgen Frantz Hammershaimb (6 July 1767 - 24 May 1820) was a Faroese lawyer. He was Lawman (prime minister) of the Faroe Islands from 1805 to 1816. Hammershaimb was the last Lawman before the position was abolished.

Jørgen Frantz Hammershaimb was the father of Venceslaus Ulricus Hammershaimb, who set the rules and orthography for the modern Faroese language.

Political offices
Preceded by Johan Michael Lund	Prime Minister of the Faroe Islands; 1805-1816	Succeeded by Position abolished
