= Pætur Jákupsson =

Prime Minister of the Faroe Islands

Lawman of the Faroe Islands
- In office 1588–1601
- Preceded by: Ísak Guttormsson
- Succeeded by: Tummas Símunarson

Personal details
- Born: Suðuroy, Faroe Islands
- Occupation: Farmer

Pætur Jákupsson was, from 1588 to 1601, lawman (prime minister) of the Faroe Islands.

Pætur came from Suðuroy, where he was leaseholder of the farm Gjørðagarður in Porkeri. He also had land in Froðba, but he was first and foremost a leaseholder, and kongsbonde of Kirkjubøargarður in Kirkjubøur.

Political offices
Preceded by Ísak Guttormsson	Lawman of the Faroe Islands; 1572-1583	Succeeded by Tummas Símunarson
