= Jørundur Skógdrívsson =

Prime Minister of Faroe islands

Lawman of the Faroe Islands
- In office 1479–1524
- Preceded by: Roald (Løgmaður)
- Succeeded by: Tórmóður Sigurðsson

Jørundur Skógdrívsson (or Jørund Skogdrivsson), was, from 1479 to 1524, the lawman of the Faroe Islands.

Political offices
| Preceded by Roald | Lawman of the Faroe Islands; 1479-1524 | Succeeded by Tórmóður Sigurðsson |
