= Zakarias Tormóðsson =

Lawman of the Faroe Islands

Lawman of the Faroe Islands
- In office 1608–1628
- Preceded by: Tummas Símunarson
- Succeeded by: Jógvan Justinusson

Personal details
- Died: 1628

Zakarias Tormóðsson (died 1628) was Lawman of the Faroe Islands from 1608 to 1628.

Political offices
Preceded by Tummas Símunarson	Lawman of the Faroe Islands; 1608-1628	Succeeded by Jógvan Justinusson
