= Símun =

Prime Minister of Faroe Islands

Símun (or Simon), was, around the year 1350, lawman of the Faroe Islands

Political offices
Preceded by Sjúrður	Lawman of the Faroe Islands c.a. 1350–?.?.	Succeeded by Dagfinnur Halvdanarson
