= Tórmóður Sigurðsson =

Prime Minister of the Faroe Islands (died 1531)

Lawman of the Faroe Islands
- In office 1524–1531
- Preceded by: Jørundur Skógdrívsson
- Succeeded by: Andras Guttormsson

Personal details
- Died: 1531

Tórmóður Sigurðsson (or Tormod Sigurdsson) (died 1531) was, from 1524 to 1531, lawman (prime minister) of the Faroe Islands.

Political offices
Preceded by Jørundur Skógdrívsson	Lawman of the Faroe Islands; 1524-1531	Succeeded by Andras Guttormsson
