= Balzer Jacobsen =

Prime Minister of the Faroe Islands

Lawman of the Faroe Islands
- In office 1655–1661
- Preceded by: Jógvan Poulsen
- Succeeded by: Jógvan Poulsen

Balzer Jacobsen was Lawman (prime minister) of the Faroe Islands from 1655 to 1661.

Balzer Jacobsen was Danish, and was put in place by King Frederik III against the will of the Faroese Løgting. Jacobsen was first and foremost of Christoffer Gabel's men, who was vogt (overseer) of the Faroe Islands. Gabel also had a monopoly on trade to and from the islands during this period. In 1661, Jógvan Poulsen regained control as Lawman and Jacobsen withdrew to Denmark, but the real power in the Faroe Islands still lay with the land owners. This period of Faroese history is known in Faroese as Gablatíðin, and was difficult due to the trade monopoly and wishes from Copenhagen about the crown's absolute control of the fiefdom.

Political offices
Preceded by Jógvan Poulsen	Lawman of the Faroe Islands; 1655-1661	Succeeded by Jógvan Poulsen
