= Dagfinnur Halvdanarson =

Faroese politician

Dagfinnur Halvdanarson (or Dagfinn Halfdansson), was, around the year 1400, Lawman of the Faroe Islands. He is mentioned as such in the Kongsbókin manuscript.

Political offices
Preceded by Símun	Lawman of the Faroe Islands c.a. 1400-?.?.	Succeeded by Haraldur Kálvsson
