= Death of Eugene Ejike Obiora =

2006 death during a police arrest in Norway

Eugene Ejike Obiora
- Born: 25 February 1958; Lagos, Nigeria
- Died: 7 September 2006 (aged 48); Trondheim, Norway
- Cause of death: Asphyxiation during police arrest

Eugene Ejike Obiora (25 February 1958 – 7 September 2006) was a naturalized Norwegian citizen, originally from Nigeria. The first-born of 10 siblings, he had lived in Norway for more than 20 years. On 7 September 2006 he was choked to death by Trondheim police officer Trond Volden.

Obiora's name entered the public limelight in Norway after he died during a police arrest at a social services office, Østbyen Servicekontor, in Trondheim. He was there to complain against his being denied welfare (financial aid). According to early news reports, Obiora threatened and photographed the staff, and police were subsequently called in. When Obiora refused to leave the premises and resisted arrest, a scuffle ensued where a stranglehold was employed by one of the arresting officers. Shortly thereafter Obiora lost consciousness and was transported to the local hospital by the police. He was pronounced dead despite resuscitation attempts. The nurses who received the police patrol car have stated in police interviews that he was positioned "completely limp on his stomach face down on the floor of the supervisor vehicle."

The case made headlines locally and nationally, with accusations of unnecessary use of force and racism leveled at the local police, as well as uproar in African diaspora in Norway.

== Cause of death ==
According to an article in the Norwegian newspaper Aftenposten in June 2007, the autopsy report (Nordrum and Haugen) gives the following commentary on the cause of death: "The chain of events indicate that the deceased, who was most likely in a state of strong emotional upheaval, has found himself in a situation that was highly detrimental to his respiration by first having been subjected to a 'strangle hold' and then to have been placed on his stomach having first been handcuffed." The article went on to cite additional statements from the forensic examiners which said that tests performed with healthy individuals show that a person's lung capacity is reduced by 40% when strapped down on the stomach for three minutes. The autopsy report also mentions English expert literature in which positioning-related suffocation is described in connection with police work, in psychiatric settings and during ambulance transport. In the report from the Norwegian Bureau for the Investigation of Police Affairs the cause of death is established to be strangulation. The report notes that point bleeding, internal bleeding of the neck muscles, as well as fracture of the thyroid cartilage all occurred as results of the chokehold, and then goes on to conclude that the injuries caused shortness of breath, but that they alone did not cause suffocation. The Special Unit in summary finds that there has not been consciously performed "any one act which stopped/hindered" Obiora from breathing. The report goes on stating that it cannot be ruled out that Obiora's death "could have been avoided if the officers had had knowledge about possible dangers of using the stomach position".

== Renewed interest ==
The media scrutiny intensified when information was uncovered that the officer who held Obiora in a strangle hold had also been involved in an incident in 1999 with a Ghanaian woman, Sophia Baidoo that some felt were similar. The incident was filmed by a bank security camera, and the officer was later cleared of all charges.

The case took a new turn after the band Samvirkelaget produced a CD which included the song "Stopp Volden" (Stop the Violence/Stop Volden) in which one of the officers who took part in the incident was named. The Norwegian Police Federation sued the band to have the release stopped. The court did not find grounds for issuing an injunction. Nevertheless, it stated that the publicizing of the name of the policeman was libelous. The Norwegian Police Federation was considering suing Samvirkelaget for slander. The case was heard and settled in favour of Samvirkelaget.

Sør-Trøndelag police district filed a libel complaint on 2 May 2007 against a blog for having identified the previously mentioned officer by giving his name as well as picture in connection with the case.

== Police investigation ==
The case was investigated by the Bureau for the Investigation of Police Affairs but was abandoned on 4 May 2007, concluding that in the case of three officers there was insufficient evidence to pursue an indictment, a fourth officer, identified as the chauffeur of the patrol car was cleared of any involvement. The Middle Norway Special Unit recommended however that the National Police Directorate be cited with corporate punishment for insufficient police education and training concerning the dangers of stomach positioning and leglock. However, the national chief of the Special Unit for Police Affairs did not follow up on this recommendation. All this caused 1100 people to protest in a rally in Trondheim on 8 May 2007, and in simultaneous protests in Trondheim and Oslo on May 19. An eyewitness, Ghulam Ali, spoke at the rally giving his version of what took place on the day of Obiora's death, when he saw the incident from a distance and heard the screams from Obiora who had been placed on the ground by the police.

== Demand for prosecution of police officers ==
In May 2007 the next of kin of Eugene Obiora appealed the dismissal of the investigation against the arresting officers to the Norwegian Attorney General, and on June 28 the Attorney General ordered the Special Unit for Police Affairs to instigate a new and more thorough investigation of the case.

Lawyer Abid Q. Raja, representing Eugene Obiora's surviving family, has demanded that the three arresting officers be charged with willful homicide in the case. Raja has also asserted that one of the officers involved in the arrest teaches arrest techniques at the Norwegian Police University College, a position which should have made the officer especially aware of the consequences of abuse of force. Meanwhile, a lawyer representing the three police officers has stated that Raja is misrepresenting the facts of the case when he repeatedly asserts that Obiora was killed as a direct result of the police using a controversial grip around his throat. "Opinion has been comprehensively misinformed through sensational media coverage. Raja has from the very first said that a policeman has used a stranglehold and that this is the sole cause of death. This is fundamentally incorrect and has led to a public persecution of this officer," the lawyer says.

== Consequences of the Obiora case ==
As a direct consequence of the case, training at the Norwegian Police Academy has undergone changes and national police director Ingelin Killengreen has instigated a thorough review of police methods generally. The policemen who are involved in the case told the Trondheim daily Adresseavisen in mid-September 2007 that they would urge the central police leadership to implement routines for temporary reassigning officers involved in cases such as the Obiora case, where three of the officers have remained in their positions during the investigations and the fourth was reassigned based on his own initiative. The officers state that they understand how the public would be upset when such reassignments are not implemented. They emphasize however that there would have to be a change of the rules for this to become routine as otherwise a reassignment would be perceived, both by the officers and by the public at large, as a censure. Sør-Trøndelag police chief Per Marum has on several occasions responded to claims that the officers be suspended that according to the Norwegian civil servant act this can only be effected when existing information exists that could lead to dismissal.

Also in mid-September 2007, the leader of the Special Unit for Police Affairs, Jan Egil Presthus, stated to the Oslo daily Dagsavisen that all investigations into police conduct of cases that have ended in deaths are going to be posted on the Internet. He states that a total openness in this way will strengthen the public confidence in the unit's integrity and ability to conduct its investigations impartially. This comes following Dagsavisen's listing in June of police cases with a deadly result. Since the Special Unit's establishment on 1 January 2005 the investigation into ten of the most serious cases were concluded, in all 10 cases leading to all charges against the police being dropped. A buzzing media discourse focusing on deaths incurred during police arrests and transports has been going on in Norway throughout 2007, and Presthus counts this as one factor triggering the initiative to publish ongoing investigations on the Internet. The cases will be presented on the web pages of the Special Unit for Police Affairs, and they will be presented in a way that preserves the anonymity of officers that are involved, and also other parties in cases where that is considered necessary with respects to protection of privacy.

== See also ==
- Asphyxia
- Police misconduct in Norway
