= Guttormur Andrasson =

Prime Minister of the Faroe Islands (died 1572)

Lawman of the Faroe Islands
- In office 1544–1572
- Preceded by: Andras Guttormsson
- Succeeded by: Jógvan Heinason

Personal details
- Died: 1572 Bergen, Norway
- Children: Ísak Guttormsson (son)
- Parent: Andras Guttormsson (father)

Guttormur Andrasson (died 1572 in Bergen), was, from 1544 to 1572, lawman of the Faroe Islands.

Guttormur Andrasson was the son of previous lawman Andras Guttormsson from Sumba, and father of later lawman Ísak Guttormsson.

Political offices
Preceded by Andras Guttormsson	Lawman of the Faroe Islands; 1544-1572	Succeeded by Jógvan Heinason
