= Roald (Løgmaður) =

Lawman of the Faroe Islands

Roald was, around the year 1450, Lawman (or Lawspeaker) of the Faroe Islands.

Little is known about Roald, apart from that he had a farm in Dalur, and that he probably originated from Shetland.

In G.V.C. Young's textbook, Færøerne – fra vikingetiden til reformationen, Roald is not named. However, in the Lagting's official list of First Ministers, he is included.

Political offices
Preceded by Haraldur Kálvsson	Lawman of the Faroe Islands c.a. 1450-?.?.	Succeeded by Jørundur Skógdrívsson
