= Heine Havreki =

- Born: 1514; Bergen, Norway
- Died: 1576 (aged 61–62); Radøy, Norway
- Occupation: Lutheran pastor

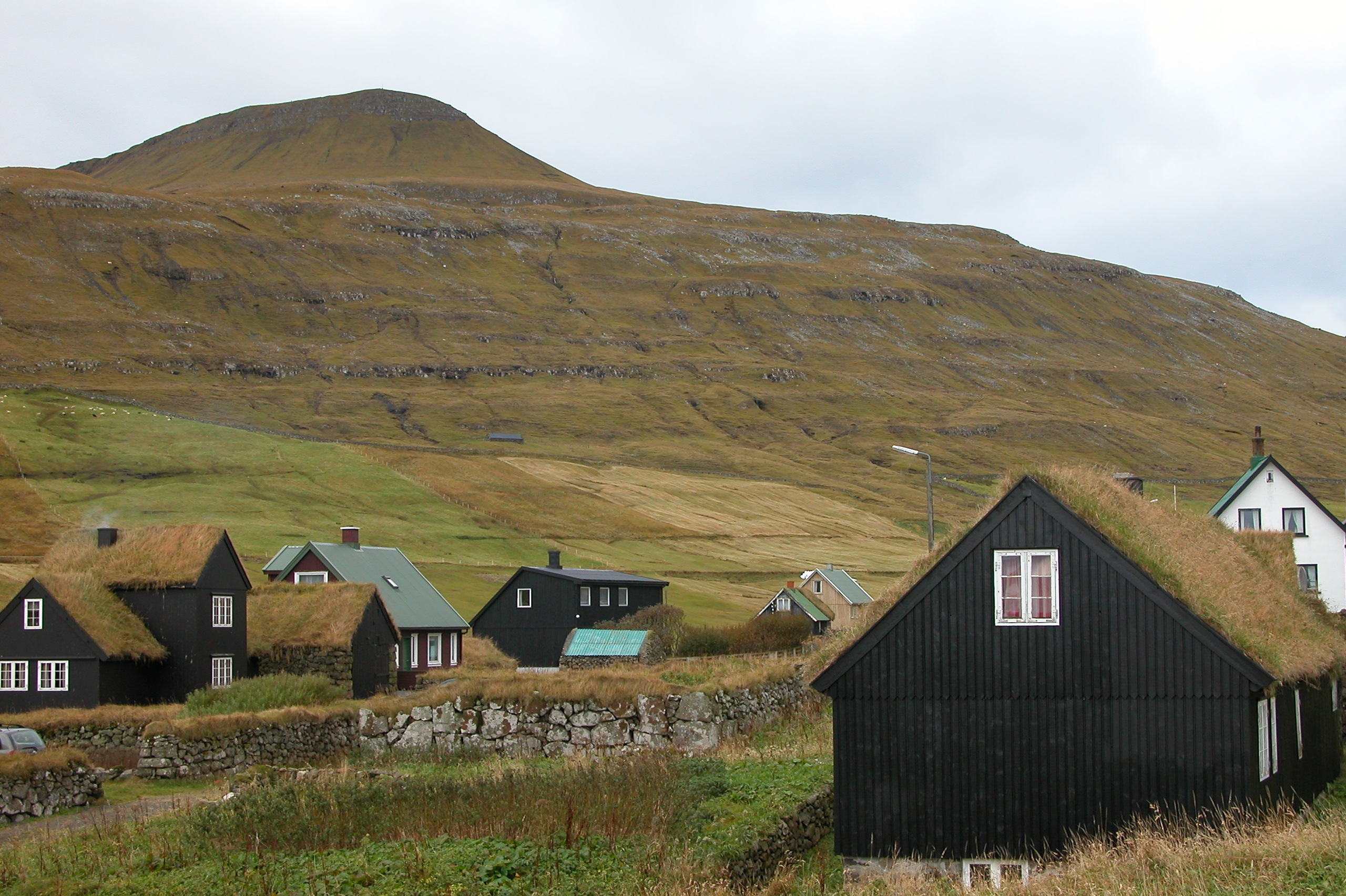
Húsavík on the island Sandoy in the Faroe Islands, the site where Heini was shipwrecked

Heine Johnsøn Havreki (1514–1576) or Heine the shipwrecked was a Norwegian born-Icelandic Lutheran pastor who helped introduce the Protestant Reformation on the Faroe Islands.

== Biography ==
Heine Johnsøn was reportedly born in Bergen, Norway the son of Jon Haraldson, an Icelandic Roman Catholic minister. While Havreki was studying in Bergen, he and some other students were travelling to Iceland but were caught up in bad weather and shipwrecked in the Faroe Islands. They were taken care of by a local woman, Herborg of Húsavík, with whom he subsequently became married. Together they had a son Jógvan Heinason (1541–1602) and daughter Herborg Heinadottir (born 1542).

In 1534, he served as deputy to Ámundur Olavsson, the last Roman Catholic bishop of the Diocese of the Faroe Islands. Ámundur Olavsson held his office, based at Kirkjubøur, until he was forced to yield his see and title in 1538. Following the Protestant Reformation, Heine was one of the first Lutheran priests in the Faroe islands as vicar for the island of Eysturoy. Heine was consecrated on Ólavsøka in 1541 when the church became Protestant.

Following the death of Heine's wife Herborg, he traveled back to Norway. There around 1544, he married Gyri Arnbjørnsdatter. Together they had a son Magnus Heinason (1548–1589). In 1566, Heine served at a church on Radøy in the Nordhordland district in Hordaland where he later died.

== See also ==
- Roman Catholicism in the Faroe Islands
- Church of the Faroe Islands

== Other sources ==
- Færoæ & Færoa reserata by Lucas Debes written in 1673
- Natural and political history of the Faroe Islands in the Danish translation by C. G. Mengel, Copenhagen / Leipzig 1757. comments by Norbert B. Vogt. Mülheim a. d. Ruhr: 2005. S. 130

== Related reading ==
- Young, G.V.C. (1979) From the Vikings to the Reformation. A Chronicle of the Faroe Islands up to 1538 (Isle of Man: Shearwater Press) ISBN 9780904980202
