= Magnus Heinason =

Faroese naval hero, trader and privateer

- Born: 1545; Nes or Oyndarfjørður?, Faroe Islands
- Died: 18 January 1589 (aged 44); Copenhagen, Denmark
- Spouse(s): Sophia Axeldatter Gyhnterberg, (Norwegian)
- Parent(s): Heine Havreki, Gyri Arnbjørnsdatter,

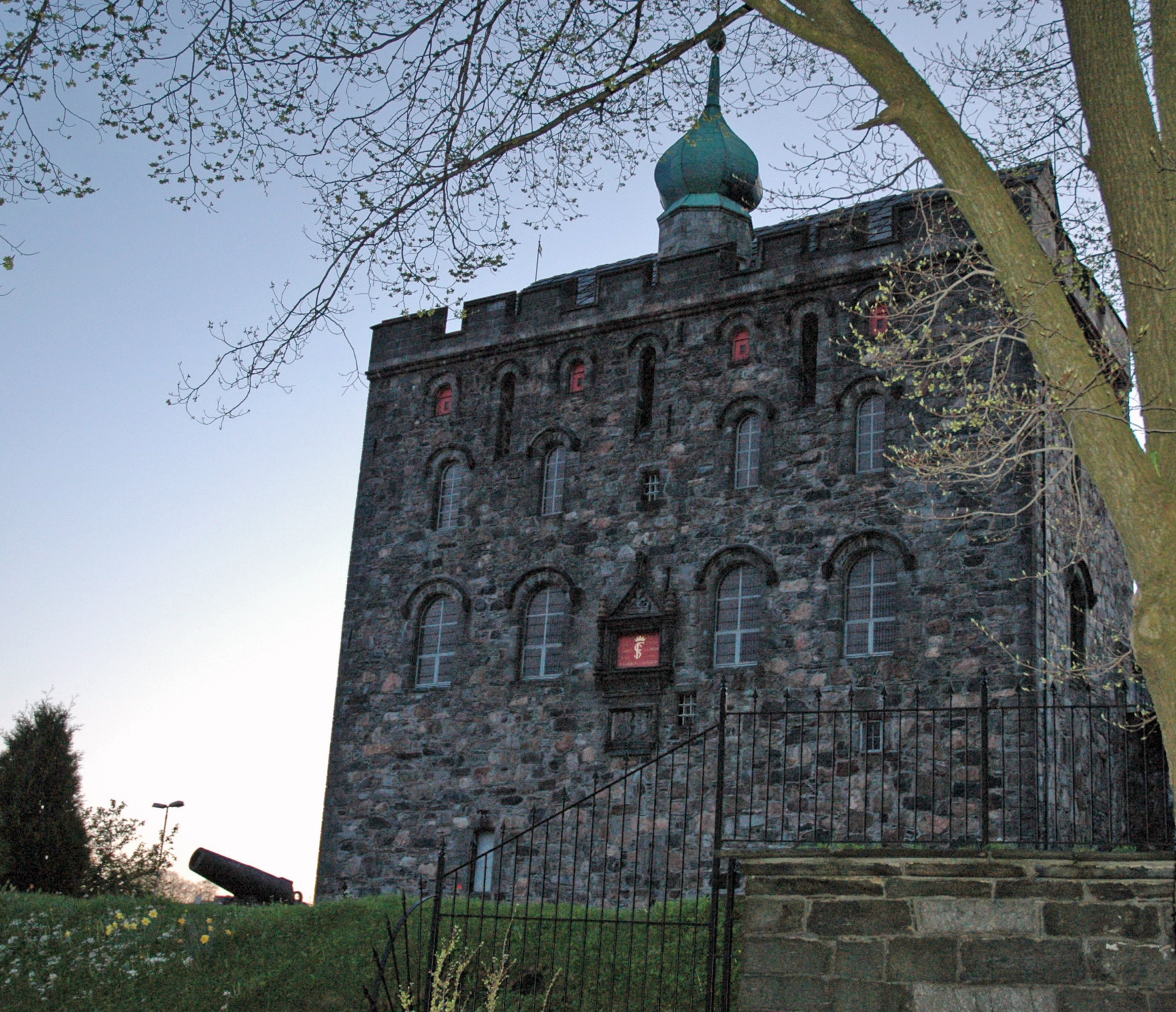
The Rosenkrantz Tower located on Bergenhus Fortress

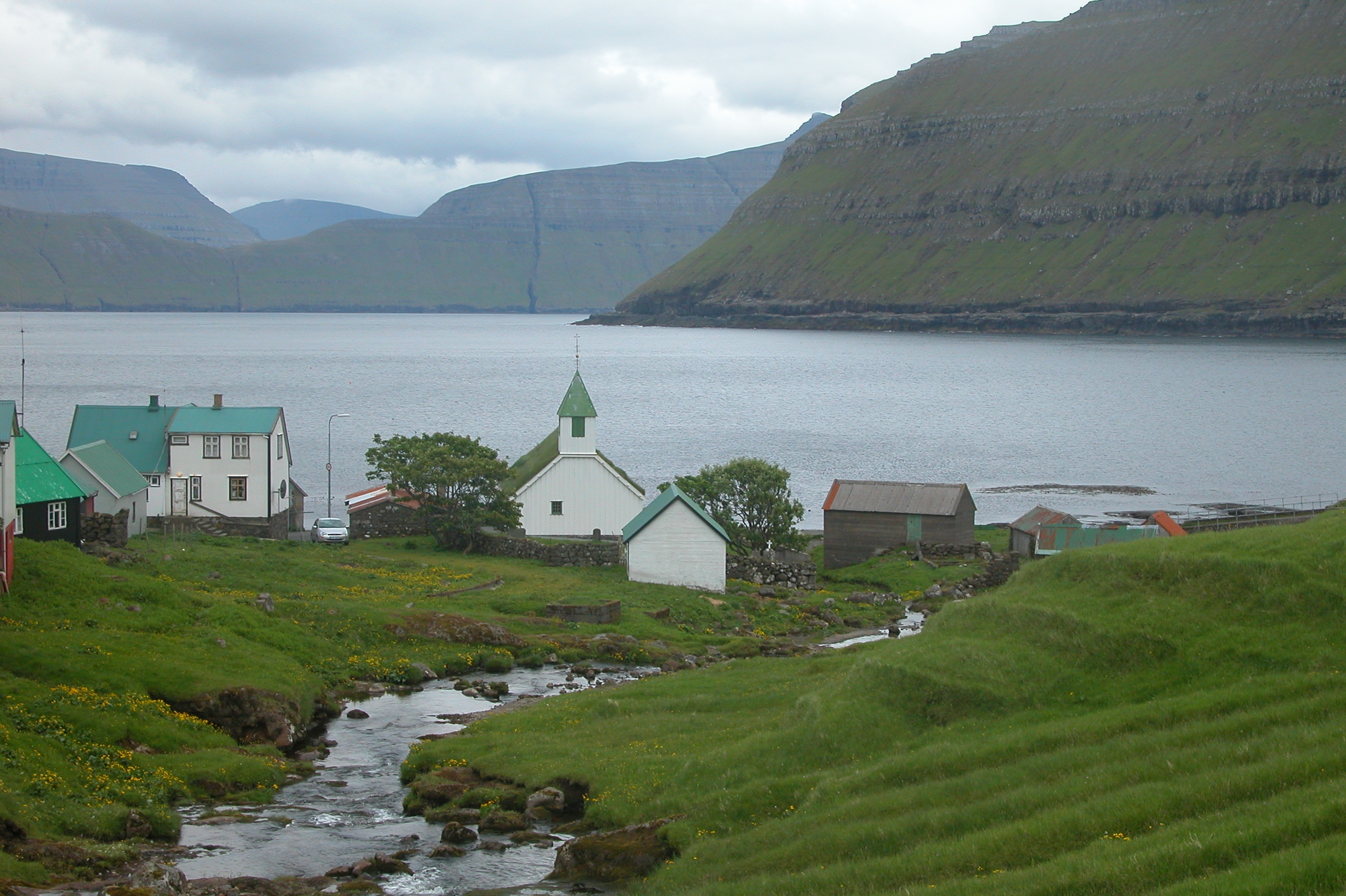
Oyndarfjørður

Magnus Heinason (Mogens Heinesøn) (1548 – 18 January 1589) was a Faroese naval hero, trader and privateer.

Magnus Heinason served William the Silent and his son Maurice of Nassau, Prince of Orange for 10 years as a privateer, fighting the Spanish in the Dutch Revolt. Magnus Heinason was given the trading rights to the Faroe Islands by King Frederick II of Denmark and Norway. Later he received letters of marque to sink or capture pirate ships and English merchant ships.

Magnus built the first fortifications in Tórshavn. Only one year later, he was captured and sent to Copenhagen on the orders of the Danish treasurer and statholder, Christoffer Walkendorf (1525–1601) who was ruling Denmark after the sudden death of Frederick II. Magnus Heinason was tried, and was beheaded 18 January 1589. His widow, Sofie von Günsterberg, and his business partner Hans Lindenov (d. 1610) contested this act and brought the matter to an assembly of nobles (Herrendag) at the seaport of Kolding. Magnus Heinason's death sentence was declared void on 6 August 1590 and posthumously he was rehabilitated. Valkendorff was suspended from his duties and was forced to pay 3,000 Reichsthaler to the heirs. Magnus Heinason's remains were exhumed and taken to Ørslev Kloster (Ørslevkloster) on Lindenov's estate where they lie under the floor of the monastery church until this day.

== Family ==
Heinason was the son of Heine Havreki (1514–1576), a Norwegian priest from Bergen who emigrated to the Faroe Islands and who helped introduce the Lutheran Reformation to the Faroe Islands, and Gyri Arnbjørnsdatter, Havreki's second wife from a powerful and wealthy Norwegian clan. In his job as a priest in the Faroes, Heine Havreki traveled much by sea, to and from the islands. Magnus accompanied him on these journeys. Even as a little boy Magnus knew how to sail small boats and gained a lot of experience that would be useful later in life. As a grown man in his career as a seaman and a privateer he would carry out some of his most notorious acts in these same waters.

Magnus Heinason was engaged three times and married twice. Magnus had a son with a Faroese lady Kollfina around 1560. Rasmus Magnussen (1560–1670) lived to the age of 110 years, and at the age of 103 he became the father of a son. In 1580 Magnus met a Norwegian noble lady Margrethe Axeldatter Gyntersberg or von Güntersberg (1565–1589), daughter of Norwegian nobleman Axel Gyntersberg (c. 1525–1588). They had a child Mogensbarn that died as child. They did not marry, because she accused him of rape. The noble family then demanded that he marry Margrethe's younger sister, Sophie Axeldatter Gynhterberg (1566–1607). They married in 1582 in Bergenhus, Bergen and had one daughter, Elsebeth Magnusdatter (1584–1645). She later married Anders Matsen Ǣnes and lived at Ǣnes in the Hardangerfjord in Norway.

== Early life ==
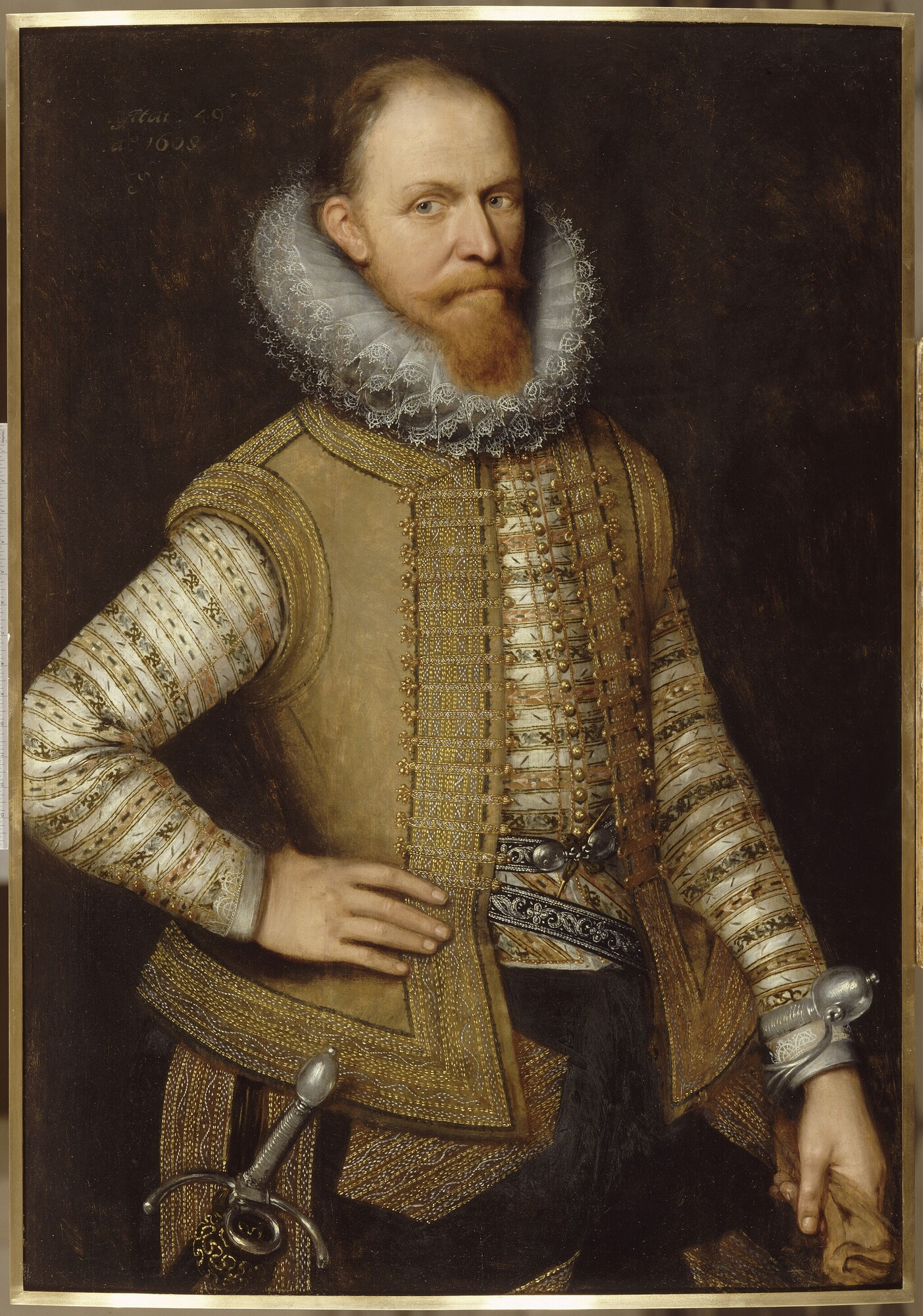
Maurice of Nassau, Prince of Orange – portrait by Michiel Jansz van Mierevelt

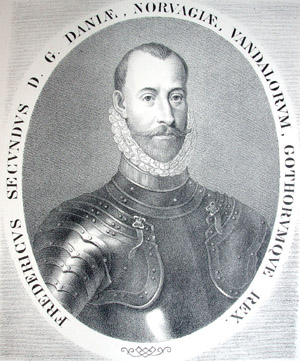
Frederick II of Denmark and Norway

When Magnus was 17 or 18 years old his father was transferred to Norway. The family moved to Bergen. Here Magnus was able to live out his dream of becoming a seaman primarily due to family connections on his father's side. At a young age he was made captain of a trade ship on the route that his father had sailed for many years, namely the route from Bergen to the Faroe Islands. On his third trip he was attacked by pirates. What actually occurred is not known, but when he returned to Bergen, people ridiculed him for giving up without a fight. He was deeply upset by this incident and swore that he would take revenge. He left Norway and went to the Netherlands where he joined the Navy. Little is known about this part of Magnus’ life. He returned about 10 years later with commendations from Maurice of Nassau, Prince of Orange and his father William the Silent for bravery in combat at sea against the Spanish in the Dutch Revolt which eventually resulted in the liberation of the Dutch people from the Spanish crown.

== Returning to Denmark ==
Magnus returned to Denmark with good recommendations from Maurice of Nassau, Prince of Orange - something that would be beneficial for him in later negotiations with the Danish King, Frederick II of Denmark and Norway. It is likely that Magnus had planned to move back to Bergen and take up his old job as captain on the trade route between Bergen and the Faroe Islands. This time however he was the proprietor of his own ship. The fact that his half-brother Jón Heinason was made Løgmaður in 1571 during Magnus' stay in the Dutch navy was certainly an advantage for any new plans in this direction. If Magnus had planned to obtain the trade rights for this route or perhaps even a monopoly for the trading to and from the Faroe Islands, they were immediately dashed by the treasurer and statholder (Danish: rentekammeret), Christoffer Valkendorff. Shortly before had he abolished the old tradition of granting exclusive trade rights to private merchants. In the meanwhile ships trading on and from the Islands did so under government auspices and regulations and paying respective fees. This state monopoly started in 1578. That was the year of Magnus’ return home.

== The monopoly ==
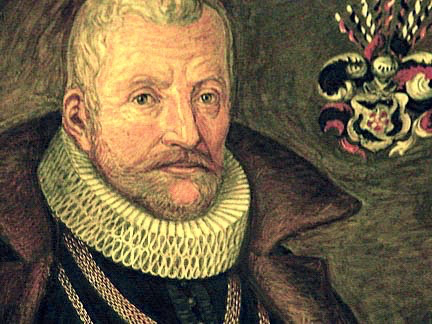
Christoffer Valkendorff

Magnus went to the king to improve his position by trying to prove that he was worthy to take over the trade on the Faroe Islands. The king however was not pleased with the idea of giving up monopoly trade which he had just obtained for himself. In order to find some loophole Magnus used an excuse that some people owed him money on the Faroes, and he had to collect it. For this reason he bid the king to grant him a special travel pass. He requested one trip from Bergen to the Faroe Islands in order to get what belonged to him. The king could not see anything wrong in this plan being that Heinason was a man of word and honour. But before he gave him the free pass, he made Magnus promise not to trade goods, even if his debtors offered him goods instead of money. If he should come into possession of goods, he was to hand them over to the king. Magnus agreed to this. The king granted him free passage for this trip, and Magnus left Copenhagen.

Upon returning home he tried to bend the stipulations for his journey a bit, but suddenly he had entirely different plans in mind. He met with several of the farmers and high standing people on the Faroes including his half brother Jógvan Heinason (1541–1602), high Judge of the Faroes (Løgmaður). He talked these leaders into a small type of rebellion against the new government monopoly. And Magnus was successful! The people on the islands proposed to the king that instead of the king leading the trade, a supervisor should keep the books and make sure everything was legal. If the king would not agree to this proposal, the Faroese people at least wanted a man of their choice from the Islands to be in command of a ship of his own. He should be able travel back and forth between the Faeroe Islands and Bergen trading in timber and wheat - two commodities which had become scarce since the government had monopolized trade for itself.

At the ting no names were mentioned, but it was clear whom the assembly members had in mind. The Faroese proposal was presented to the king in December 1578 in Koldinghus. The Faroese men who had traveled all the way to Kolding said that they wished to have a man called Magnus Heinason to be the commander of ships doing trade with their islands. The king did not want to make this decision himself; instead, he turned the matter over to his treasurer and statholder Christoffer Valkendorff. He was to decide what was in best interest for the king, since he was the one who had proposed to the king to begin a monopoly on the Faeroe Islands. While Valkendorff and the clerks were counting numbers, calculating and checking books, Magnus took advantage of the situation and became good friends with King Frederick II. Any way Valkendorff would turn it, any losses he predicted and any facts that he could state - nothing could come between Magnus and his new friend King Frederik II. The king granted Heinason the command of the ships and gave him the trade rights. Christoffer Valkendorff's plan of upholding a trade monopoly on the Faroese vanished in thin air. The Faroese now would send all goods that were produced in the Faroe Islands on ships owned by Magnus Heinason, and all goods needed on the Islands (timber, beer, wheat and the like) would be brought by Magnus’ fleet.

== Pirates raiding Tórshavn ==
In the summer of 1579 Tórshavn was raided by a Scottish pirate named Klerck. Magnus first heard of this when he landed in Tórshavn. The Scots had taken most of the king's taxes and also a lot of private goods that were stored in Tórshavn. Magnus himself had lost goods that were intended to be sold and then taxed by the king. Magnus left the Faroe Islands and went to Denmark to present this case to the king. He wanted the king to cover the loss of the goods, since Magnus had paid for them and the king would have received taxes for them. The king agreed to cover half the loss. Magnus was to take on the rest. Magnus was not pleased by this proposal. He requested that the king should allow him to arm his merchant ships with cannons so that he could fight the pirates or at least take them prisoner and then take them on shore for trial. Since he had served in war in the Dutch navy, and had fine recommendations from Maurice of Nassau, Prince of Orange, King Frederick II conceded. In this context King Frederick mentioned the Oresund taxes which he was losing, when Dutch merchants sailed the northern route along the coast of Norway into the White Sea to trade with Russia, instead of taking the shorter route between Denmark and Sweden through Oresund. Hence Magnus got letters of marque to stop and confiscate any foreign ship that intended to travel north along the coast of Norway with one stipulation however: That Magnus should not attack any merchant or navy vessels of any nation, if they were travelling "rightfully".

== Valkendorf's Rule ==
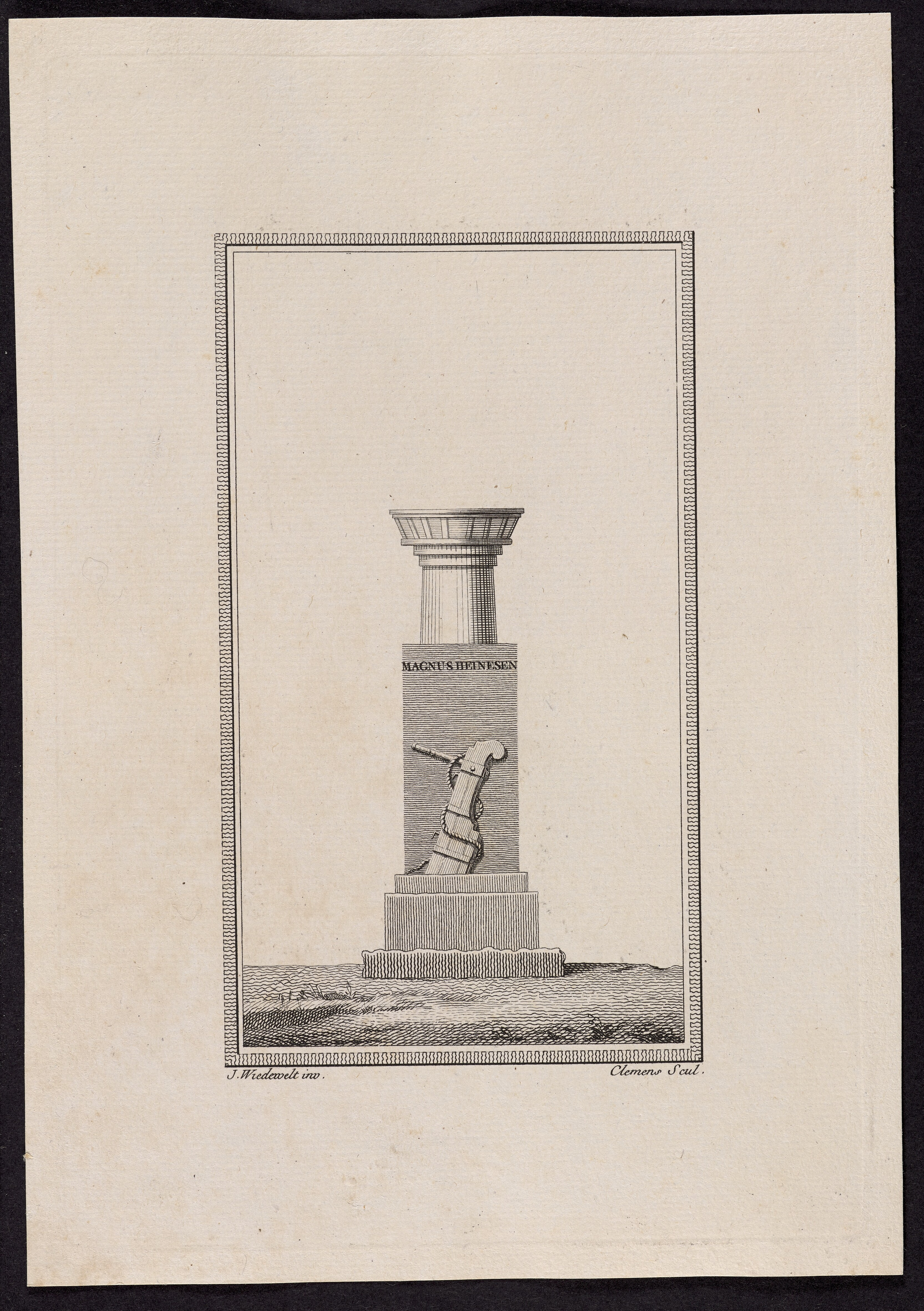
Monument to Magnus Heinason designed by Johannes Wiedewelt in Jægerspris Memorial Park at Jægerspris Castle, Denmark.

To soften the king again offered Heinason now trying to find a passage to Greenland. This he did not. Christoffer Valkendorf was still looking to trap him, and in 1581 he was faced with accusations of fraud by trading and rape in Norway. As the situation became so threatening to Heinason that he fled to Holland and again went to the service of the Prince of Orange. Two years later he went back his former patron Frederick II, which set the bar over old accusations and let Magnus have the island of Egholm in Limfjord as a fief. But Christopher Valkendorf was not going to give up, and now he was using English, which accused Heinason illegal boarding of an English ship, while serving in the Netherlands. Magnus fled again, but was overtaken and arrested in Norway. While this was happening, the king died suddenly, and Valkendorf used the opportunity to carry out a rapid and irregular trial. Two days later, on 18 January 1589, was Heinason executed by beheading on Christiansborg Palace Square (Christiansborg Slotsplads) in Copenhagen. Valkendorf had finally got rid of his enemy.

== Acquitted ==
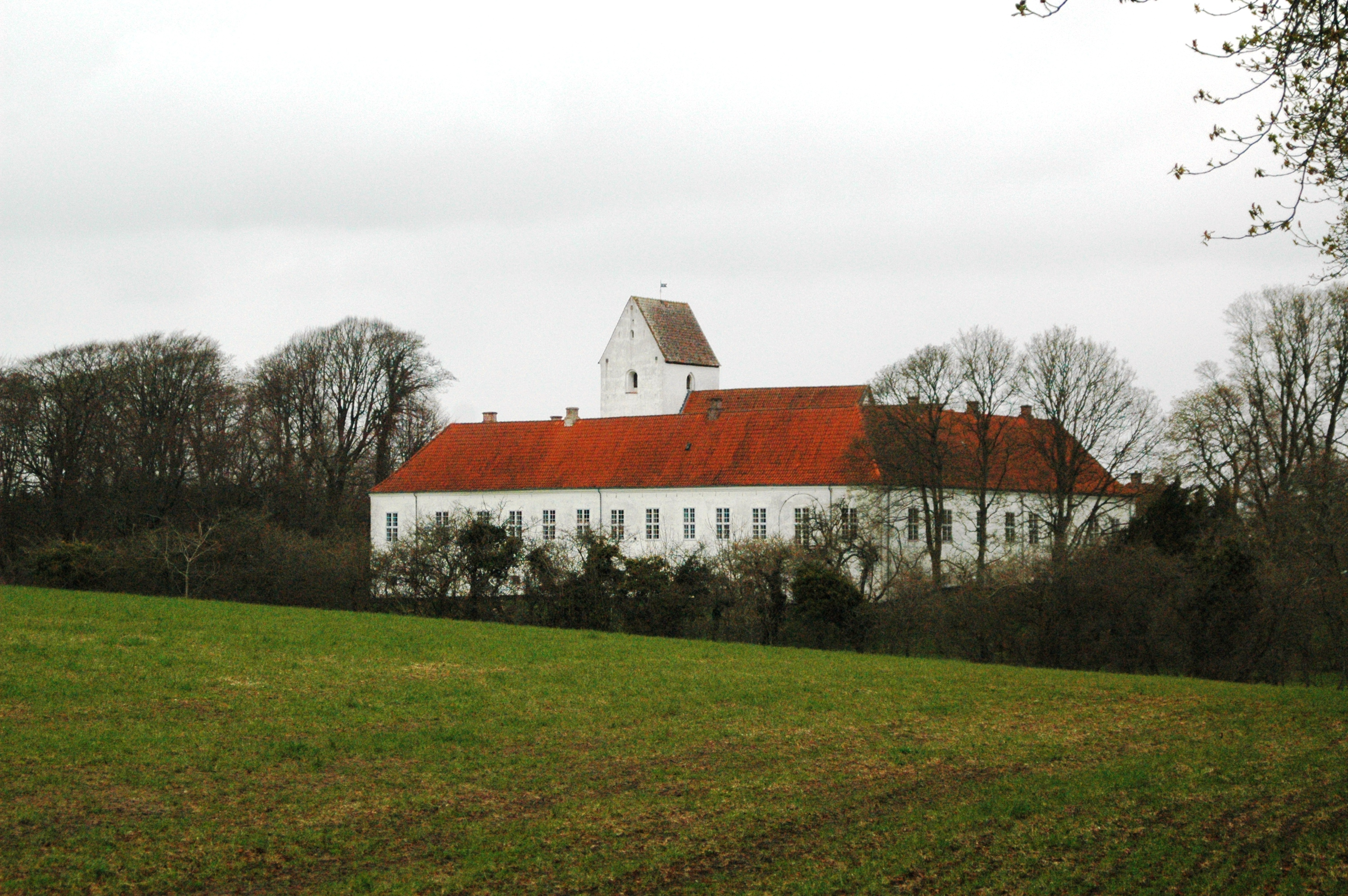
Ørslev Kloster

Under the influence of nobleman Hans Lindenov and the widow, Sofia, the case was taken up again the following year because of the irregular trial. Here Heinason was acquitted of all charges. The body was moved and got an honorable burial at Ørslev Kloster (Ørslevkloster). Christopher Valkendorf lost all his offices. Today Heinason is regarded as a hero in the Faroe Islands. At Jægerspris Castle (Jægerspris Slot) on Zealand, there is a memorial to Heinason together with Ludvig Holberg, Snorri Sturluson and other famous and illustrious names from the Danish kingdom.

== Literature ==
Faroese priest Lucas Debes (1623–1675) commented in his lifework Færoæ & Færoa Reserata:

Even travelled in Norway and on the Faroe Islands, this Magnus Heinesen`s death, his fellow countrymen were deeply in sorrow. The Faroese people say that he was a man who protected the Islands, his father came here and settled here, his brother and sister was born here, and they lived and died here, and thereafter his descendants and friends also live here.

— Lucas Debes, Færoæ & Færoa Reserata

== See also ==
- Sikuijivitteq (Mogens Heinesen Fjord)

== Other sources ==
- Troels Frederik Troels-Lund (1911) Mogens Heinesøn: Et Tidsbillede fra det 16de Aarhundrede (Copenhagen Gyldendal)

== Related reading ==
- John F. West (1972) Faroe - The Emergence of a Nation (C. Hurst and Company: London/New York City) ISBN 978-0839720638
- John F. West (1985) The History of the Faroe Islands, 1709-1816 (C.A. Reitzels Boghandel: Copenhagen) ISBN 978-8774214861
