= Johan Michael Lund =

Prime Minister of the Faroe Islands (1786–1805)

Lawman of the Faroe Islands
- In office 1786–1805
- Preceded by: Jacob Hveding
- Succeeded by: Jørgen Frantz Hammershaimb

Personal details
- Born: 2 September 1753 Bergen, Norway
- Died: 15 May 1824 (aged 70)

Johan Michael Lund (2 September 1753 – 15 May 1824) was a Norwegian lawyer from Bergen active during the time of Denmark-Norway. From 1786 to 1805 he was Lawman (Faroese: Løgmaður) (prime minister) of the Faroe Islands.

Later, he moved back to Norway, and from 1807 he was burgomaster (Norwegian: Borgermester) of Bergen. From 1809 he was a judge of the Dano-Norwegian supreme court. He died on 15 May 1824, aged 70.

Political offices
Preceded by Jacob Hveding	Prime Minister of the Faroe Islands; 1786-1805	Succeeded by Jørgen Frantz Hammershaimb
