= Tummas Símunarson =

Prime Minister of Faroe Islands (died 1608)

Lawman of the Faroe Islands
- In office 1601–1608
- Preceded by: Pætur Jákupsson
- Succeeded by: Zakarias Tormóðsson

Personal details
- Died: 1608

Tummas Símunarson was the Lawman (prime minister) of the Faroe Islands from 1601, until his death in 1608.

Political offices
| Preceded by Pætur Jákupsson | Lawman of the Faroe Islands; 1601-1608 | Succeeded by Zakarias Tormóðsson |
