= International Bryozoology Association =

Official logo

The International Bryozoology Association (IBA) is a professional association with international membership specialising in research of the phylum Bryozoa.

== History ==
The International Bryozoology Association was founded in May 1965 in Stockholm, Sweden. The first conference was held in August 1968 in Milan, Italy.

Since then the IBA's conferences have been held every three years in a different city:

- 1st Conference: 1968, Milan, Italy (Proceedings published 1968)
- 2nd Conference: 1971, Durham, UK (Proceedings published 1973)
- 3rd Conference: 1974, Lyon, France (Proceedings published 1975)
- 4th Conference: 1977, Woods Hole, MA, US (Proceedings published 1979)
- 5th Conference: 1980, Durham, UK (Proceedings published 1981)
- 6th Conference: 1983, Vienna, Austria (Proceedings published 1985)
- 7th Conference: 1986, Bellingham, Washington, US (Proceedings published 1987)
- 8th Conference: 1989, Paris, France (Proceedings published 1991)
- 9th Conference: 1992, Swansea, UK (Proceedings published 1994)
- 10th Conference: 1995, Wellington, New Zealand (proceedings published 1996)
- 11th Conference: 1998, Panama (Proceedings published 2000)
- 12th Conference: 2001, Dublin, Ireland (Proceedings published 2002)
- 13th Conference: 2004, Concepción, Chile (Proceedings published 2005)
- 14th Conference: 2007, Boone, NC, US (proceedings published 2008)
- 15th Conference: 2010, Kiel, Germany (Proceedings published 2012)
- 16th Conference: 2013, Catania, Italy (Proceedings published 2014)
- 17th Conference: 2016, Melbourne, Australia
- 18th Conference: 2019, Liberec, Czech Republic
- 19th Conference: 2022, Dublin, Ireland

There are approximately 250 registered members of the IBA from across the world.

Year	Name of President
1965–1968	Alan Cheetham
1968–1971	Nils Spjeldnaes
1971–1974	Frank J. S. Maturo
1974–1977	John S. Ryland
1977–1980	J. D. Soule
1980–1983	Gilbert P. Larwood
1983–1986	
1986–1989	Roger J. Cuffey
1989–1992	
1995–1998	Peter Hayward
1998–2001	Frank Kenneth (Ken) McKinney
2001–2004	Dennis P. Gordon
2004–2007	Paul D. Taylor
2007–2010	Judith Winston
2010–2013	Eckart Håkansson
2013–2016	Patrick Wyse Jackson
2016–2019	Timothy Wood
2019–2022	Antonietta Rosso
2022–2025	Caroline Buttler
