= Haraldur Kálvsson =

Prime Minister of the Faroe Islands

Haraldur Kálvsson (or Harald Kalvsson), was, in the year 1412, lawman of the Faroe Islands.

Political offices
Preceded by Dagfinnur Halvdanarson	Lawman of the Faroe Islands c.a. 1412-?.?.	Succeeded by Roald
