= Alf Opheim =

Norwegian alpine skier (1920–2006)

Alf Kristian Opheim
Personal information
- Nationality: Norwegian
- Born: 28 April 1920 Bergen, Norway
- Died: 26 July 2006 (aged 86)

Sport
- Sport: Alpine skiing
- Event(s): Giant slalom, Slalom, Downhill, Alpine combined

Achievements and titles
- Olympic finals: 1952 Winter Olympics

Alf Kristian Opheim (28 April 1920 – 26 July 2006) was a Norwegian alpine skier. He was born in Bergen. He participated at the 1952 Winter Olympics in Oslo, where he competed in giant slalom.

He became Norwegian champion in alpine combined in 1950, and in both slalom and downhill in 1952.
