= Thorkelson =

Thorkelson is a surname. Notable people with the surname include:

- Jacob Thorkelson (1876–1945), Norwegian-born American politician
- Peter Thorkelson (1942–2019), American musician, composer, and actor
- Scott Thorkelson (1958–2007), Canadian politician
