= Kari Schanke =

Norwegian politician

Kari Schanke (August 29, 1922 – July 5, 2006) was a Norwegian politician for the Liberal Party of Norway.

She served as a deputy representative to the Norwegian Parliament from Telemark during the term 1965–1969.
