= Thorkild Fjeldsted =

Prime Minister of the Faroe Islands

Thorkild Jonsson Fjeldsted
- Þorkell Jónsson Fjeldsted

Lawman of the Faroe Islands
- In office 1769–1772
- Preceded by: Hans Jákupsson Debes
- Succeeded by: Jacob Hveding

Personal details
- Born: 1740
- Died: 19 November 1796 (aged 55–56)
- Occupation: Lawyer

Thorkild Jonsson Fjeldsted (Norwegian) or Þorkell Jónsson Fjeldsted (Icelandic) (1740 – 19 November 1796) was an Icelandic lawyer who practised law in Copenhagen from 1763 to 1769. From 1769 to 1772, he was Lawman (prime minister) of the Faroe Islands.

After that, he moved to Norway. From 1772 to 1778 he was county governor of Finnmark county. In 1778–1780, he became county governor of Bornholm County in Denmark. From 1780 to 1786, we was a judge in Christianssand. In 1786, he became a county governor of Trondhjem county. He held that post until 1796 when he died in Trondhjem.

Government offices
| Preceded by Hans Jákupsson Debes | Prime Minister of the Faroe Islands; 1769-1772 | Succeeded by Jacob Hveding |
| Preceded by Eiler Hagerup | County Governor of Finnmarkens amt 1772–1778 | Succeeded by Christen Heiberg |
| Preceded by Johan Christian Urne | County Governor of Bornholms amt 1778-1780 | Succeeded by Tomas Georg Münster (acting) |
| Preceded by Wilhelm Frimann Koren | County Governor of Trondhjems amt 1786-1796 | Succeeded by Gebhard Moltke |
