= Jón skráveifa =

Governor of Iceland from 1357 to 1360

Jón Guttormsson skráveifa (died 8 July 1362) was an Icelandic man who was a governor of Iceland from 1357 to 1360 and then became a lögmaður (lawspeaker). He had a very bad reputation in Iceland; he was noted for his cruelty and harsh money-collecting and had been outlawed from Iceland in 1348.

Nothing is known about his origins, to whom he was born or where, only that his sister Una was the wife of Ketil Thorlaksson who served as governor and lived at Kolbeinsstaðir in Snæfellsnes. In 1348 he was found guilty of some offence and sailed to the kings meeting. It is not known when he returned but in fall of 1357 he sailed with several other "chiefs" but never made it beyond Shetland where they overwintered. There he was again found guilty of some offence.

He returned to Iceland in summer of 1358 and had he along with three others (Thorsteinn Eyjólfsson, Andres Gíslason & Arni Thordarson) at that point been given the position of land governor for a period of three years, and was he delt the quarter to the north. By 1360 the people in the north had had enough of him and he was besieged by a team of 300 at Þverá in Vesturhop but he was able to get away.

After his position of part-governor fell out of duration he took the position of principal attorney or lawspeaker and was supported to that posiotion by the then governor Smith Andresson. In the summer of 1362 they rode north to Eyjafjörður and on the 8th of Juli they were at Grund (near Akureyri) in Island Fjord where they were attacked and killed. According to one account he was beaten to death with iron batons but by another he was dragged from the outhouse and chopped the head shorter.

== Sources ==
- Safn til sögu Íslands. 1886.
