= Oddlaug Vereide =

Norwegian politician (1933–2021)

- Born: Oddlaug Eimhjellen; 10 April 1933
- Died: 4 August 2021 (aged 88)
- Occupation: Politician
- Political party: Christian Democratic Party

Oddlaug Vereide (10 April 1933 – 4 August 2021) was a Norwegian politician for the Christian Democratic Party. She was elected deputy representative and met regularly in the Storting in 1989 and 1990.

== Political career ==
Vereide was elected deputy representative to the Storting from the constituency of Sogn og Fjordane for the period 1989–1994, for the Christian Democratic Party. She replaced Lars Gunnar Lie in the Storting from 1989 to 1990 while Lie was government minister, and was a member of the Standing Committee on Consumers and Administration from 1989 to 1990.

She was a member of the municipal council of Gloppen Municipality from 1979 to 1995. She was board member of several local organizations, and was board member of the Sogn og Fjordane chapter of the Christian Democratic Party.

== Personal life ==
Vereide was born in Gloppen on 10 April 1933, a daughter of farmers Elias Eimhjellen and Maria O. Solheim.

She died on 4 August 2021.
