= Eli Kristiansen =

Norwegian politician (1933–2025)

Eli Kristiansen (8 November 1933 – 5 July 2025) was a Norwegian politician for the Christian Democratic Party.

== Life and career ==
Kristiansen was born in Vågan Municipality on 8 November 1933. From 1972 to 1973, during the cabinet Korvald, Kristiansen was appointed political secretary (today known as political advisor) in the Ministry of Social Affairs. From 1985 to 1986, during the second cabinet Willoch, she was State Secretary in the same Ministry. She was elected to the Norwegian Parliament from Oslo in 1977, but was not re-elected in 1981. She had previously served as a deputy representative from Nordland during the term 1973–1977.

On the local level she was a member of the municipal council of Namsos Municipality from 1965 to 1971. She was a member of the central party board from 1971 to 1973 and 1977 to 1981.

Outside politics she worked in the health sector, and was active in her trade union. Kristiansen died on 5 July 2025, at the age of 91.
