= Einar Holm =

Norwegian politician (1933–2021)

Einar Knut Holm (12 August 1933 – 6 August 2021) was a Norwegian politician for the Liberal Party.

He grew up in Hareid Municipality, and following his education as a teacher he settled in Hareid. He chaired the sports club Hareid TL from 1971 to 1976, and later chaired the board of Møre og Romsdal Fylkesbåtar.

He was elected to the municipal council for Hareid Municipality in 1971, and served 32 years, among those 16 years as mayor. He was a member of Møre og Romsdal county council from 1976 to 2003, serving as deputy county mayor from 1988 to 1991. He served as a deputy representative to the Parliament of Norway from Møre og Romsdal during the term 1981–1985. In total he met during 46 days of parliamentary session.

Holm was awarded the King's Medal of Merit in gold.
