= Jógvan Justinusson =

Prime Minister of the Faroe Islands

Lawman of the Faroe Islands
- In office 1629–1654
- Preceded by: Zakarias Tormóðsson
- Succeeded by: Jógvan Poulsen

Personal details
- Born: Hattarvík, Faroe Islands
- Occupation: Member of Løgting

Jógvan Justinusson was, from 1629 to 1654, Lawman of the Faroe Islands.

Jógvan Justinusson came from Hattarvík in the Faroe Islands. Before he became lawman, he also served as part of the Faroese Løgting.

Political offices
Preceded by Zakarias Tormóðsson	Lawman of the Faroe Islands; 1629–1654	Succeeded by Jógvan Poulsen
