= Nils Spjeldnæs =

Norwegian paleontologist (1926–2006)

Nils Spjeldnæs (3 January 1926 – 28 March 2006) was a Norwegian paleontologist.

During the German occupation of Norway he fled to Sweden where he enrolled in the Norwegian police troops. He briefly stayed at Uppsala University, and took his cand.real. degree in 1949. He then took his dr.philos. degree in 1958. Primarily an invertebrate palaeontologist, he also studied certain Palaeozoic fishes, considering palaeoecology and palaeoclimatology.

After a stint at the Museum of Paleontology he became associate professor at the University of Oslo in 1961, professor at Aarhus University in 1965, and professor at the University of Oslo from 1984 to his retirement in 1995.

He was a member of the Norwegian Academy of Science and Letters from 1975, received an honorary degree from the University of Athens, and was decorated as a Knight of the Order of Dannebrog. He chaired the International Bryozoology Association from 1968 to 1971.

He resided in Oslo and died in March 2006.
