= Jógvan Heinason =

Former Lawman of the Faroe Islands (1541–1602)

Lawman of the Faroe Islands
- In office 1572–1583
- Preceded by: Guttormur Andrasson
- Succeeded by: Ísak Guttormsson

Personal details
- Born: 1541
- Died: 1602 (aged 60–61)
- Relations: Magnus Heinason (half-brother)
- Parent(s): Heine Havreki (father); Herborg (mother)

Jógvan Heinason (1541–1602) was Lawman (prime minister) of the Faroe Islands from 1572 to 1583.

Jógvan Heinason was the son of the Norwegian priest Heine Havreki and a Faroese women, Herborg from Húsavík. The son of Jógvan Heinason's Norwegian step mother, and half brother, was the Faroe Islands' most famous seafarer, Magnus Heinason.

Political offices
Preceded by Guttormur Andrasson	Lawman of the Faroe Islands; 1572-1583	Succeeded by Ísak Guttormsson
