= Per Knudsen (Norwegian footballer) =

Norwegian footballer (1930-2006)

Personal information
- Date of birth: 11 May 1930
- Date of death: 9 May 2006 (aged 75)
- Position: Striker

Senior career*
| Years | Team | Apps | (Gls) |
| 1954–1967 | Vålerenga | | |

International career
| 1951–1955 | Norway B | 5 | (0) |
| 1955–1956 | Norway | 4 | (0) |
- * Club domestic league appearances and goals

Per Knudsen (11 May 1930 – 9 May 2006) was a Norwegian footballer. He played in four matches for the Norway national football team from 1955 to 1956, and spent his club career in Vålerenga.
