= Ísak Guttormsson =

Prime Minister of the Faroe Islands

Lawman of the Faroe Islands
- In office 1583–1588
- Preceded by: Jógvan Heinason
- Succeeded by: Pætur Jákupsson

Personal details
- Parent: Guttormur Andrasson (father)

Ísak Guttormsson was, from 1583 to 1588, Lawman of the Faroe Islands.

Ísak Guttormsson lived on Suðuroy, Faroe Islands, where he had land in Nes and Vágur. He was the son of Guttormur Andrasson, former Lawman of the Faroe Islands. Little else is known about Guttormsson.

Political offices
Preceded by Jógvan Heinason	Lawman of the Faroe Islands; 1583-1588	Succeeded by Pætur Jákupsson
