= Johan Henrik Schreiner =

Norwegian historian (born 1933)

Johan Henrik Schreiner (16 November 1933 – 7 November 2022) was a Norwegian historian of Ancient Greek history, in particular the Greek polis and the Battle of Marathon.

== Selected bibliography ==
- Aristotle and Pericles: a study in historiography, 1968
- Antikkens historie, 1985
- To gode keisere? Roma under Traianus og Hadrianus, 1996, with Knut Ødegård
- Hellanikos, Thukydides and the era of Kimon, 1997
- Two battles and two bills: Marathon and the Athenian fleet, 2004
