= Astri Rynning =

Norwegian judge and politician

Astri Sverdrup Rynning (born 19 May 1915 in Sandefjord, died 17 November 2006) was a Norwegian judge and politician representing the Conservative Party. She served as a Member of Parliament 1965–1969; originally elected as a deputy member, she became an MP when Kåre Willoch was appointed to Cabinet. She was a member of the Standing Committee on Justice during her term.

Rynning obtained the cand.jur. in 1940 and worked as an assistant advocate and assistant judge. In 1945, she was employed at the Ministry of Justice, where she became Principal in 1956. She was appointed judge at Oslo District Court in 1963, and judge at Eidsivating Court of Appeal in 1969. She was appointed to the higher office of Lawspeaker in 1978 and Principal Lawspeaker in 1980. She retired from the bench in 1985, but occasionally served as a judge until she reached the age of 75 years.

She presided over the 1974 trial of the Israeli agents who were convicted of the Lillehammer murder. In 1985, she presided over the trial of Arne Treholt, who was convicted of spying for the Soviet Union and sentenced to 20 years in prison.

She was chairman of the Norwegian National Women's Council 1959–1968, Chairman of the Norwegian Women's Voluntary Defence Association and the Norwegian Female Lawyers' Association 1952–1956, and Chairman of the Norvegian Association of Judges 1978–1985.

Both her father and her grandfather represented the Conservative Party in the Parliament of Norway.

== Honours ==
- Commander of the Royal Norwegian Order of St. Olav (1984)
