= Torkildsen =

Torkildsen is a surname, a patronymic from the name Torkild. Notable people with the surname include:

- Arne Torkildsen (1899–1968), Norwegian neurosurgeon
- Even Torkildsen Lande (1758–1833), Norwegian farmer and politician
- Justin Torkildsen (born 1981), American actor
- Peter G. Torkildsen, the former Massachusetts Republican State Committee Chairman
- Thore Torkildsen Foss (1841–1913), Norwegian politician for the Liberal Party
- Tor Torkildsen (1932–2006), Norwegian novelist and seaman
- Torleif Torkildsen (1892–1944), Norwegian gymnast who competed in the 1912 Summer Olympics
- Elijah K. Torkildsen (1956 - 2015) American New York lawyer, public relations, and lobbyist
- Ken Torkildsen (1983–), Norwegian close protection officer. (Bodyguard)
