= Hatlestad Slide =

Mudslide in Bergen, Norway

Coordinates: 60°17′24″N 5°22′48″E

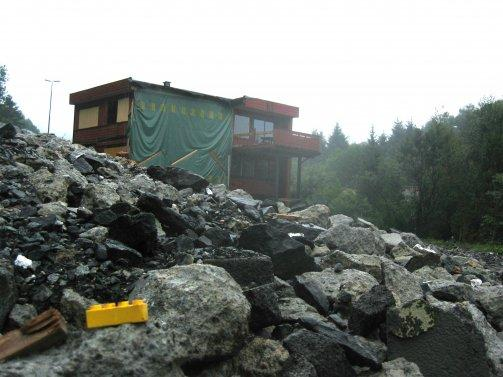
Damaged house as of 2006

The Hatlestad Slide was a slide of mud and rock as a result of heavy rainfall which occurred in the early morning of 14 September 2005 in a rural area in Bergen Municipality, Norway. The slide killed three people, wounded seven, and displaced many more, as it hit a row of residential houses in its path while the houses' occupants were asleep. The event is notable not only for the loss of life it caused, but also for how it altered Norwegian policies on environmentalism and housing construction, as well as emergency management. In addition, the question on whether or not to end the treatment of fatally wounded Kristina Hjartåker, who was put on a ventilator until her death in February, sparked national debate, both on the case itself and on the ending of life-prolonging treatment in general.

== Hatlestad before the slide ==
Hatlestad Terrasse, a rural neighborhood in the borough of Fana, consists of clusters of housing units in a hilly setting. A single one-lane street connects the housing units to each other's and to Osvegen, a major two-lane road directly connecting Osøyrø to the area of Nesttun. Hatlestad Terrasse 40, 42, 44 and 46, the grey-roofed houses closest to Osvegen, were the ones to be hit by the slide.

Before the Hatlestad Slide, Norway maintained a liberal policy when it came to housing construction on hills. The area of the afflicted housing units were therefore not surveyed for landslide risk before construction was commenced in the sixties, and the risk of landslides did not become known until later. After construction was finished, there were several incidents of rocks dislodging from the cliff and hitting the road. The rocks did not cause material damage or personal injury, and the municipality took no action besides setting up a warning sign by the road. Despite repeated complaints from Hatlestad's residents about this problem and the general risk of landslides, the municipality did not secure the area, stating that securing land against landslides is the responsibility of the property owner. However, an order given to the property owners to secure the hill were never responded to, and the case was never resolved.

== The Hatlestad landslide ==
=== Indirect causes ===
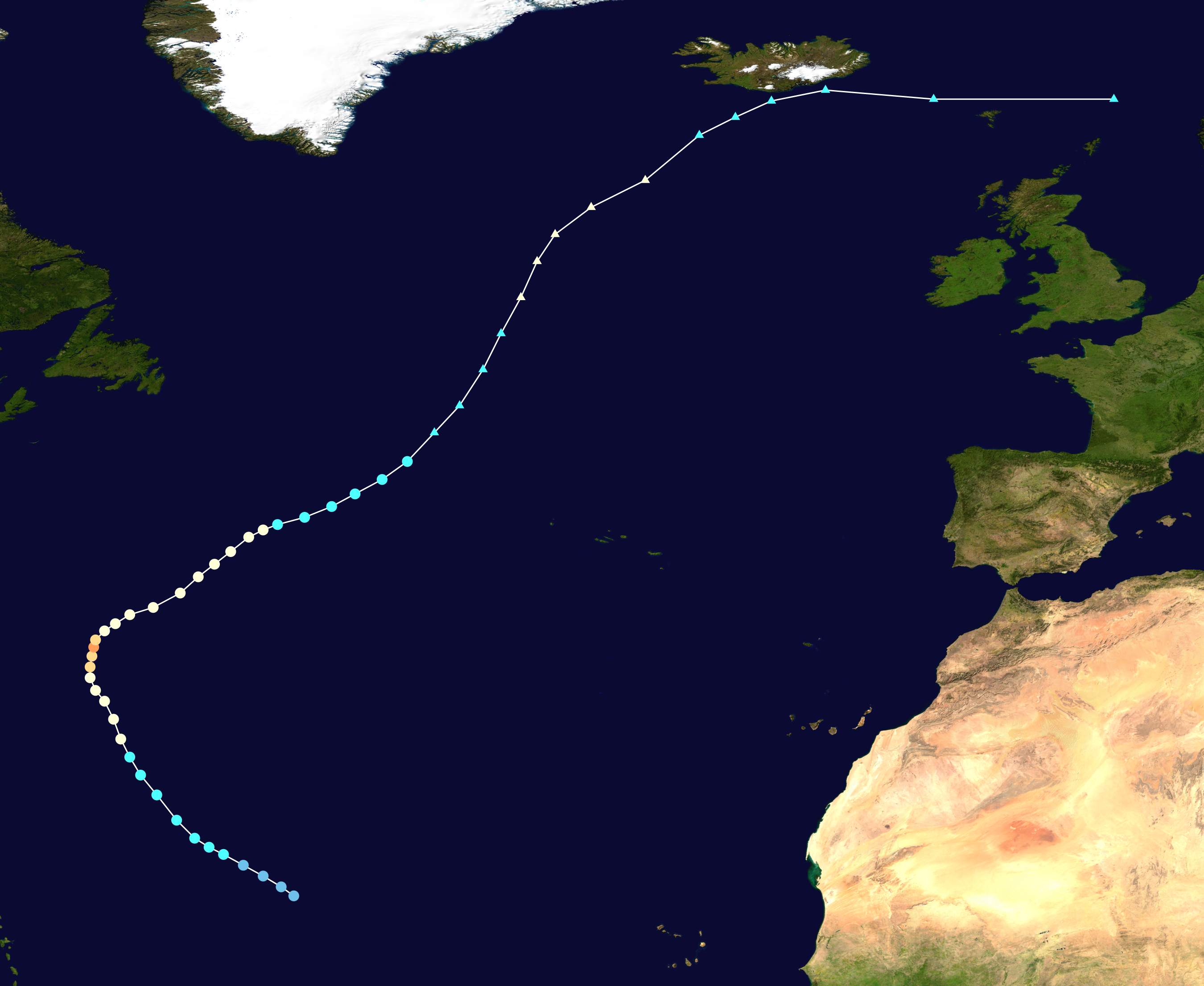
Maria's path across the west Atlantic

According to the post-slide report released by Multiconsult and reviewed by NTNU, several potential indirect causes 'should be discussed': First of all, starting weeks before the slide, Western Norway was subjected to record-breaking precipitation and winds, which increased in strength when the remnants of Hurricane Maria reached shore. The rainstorm, named Kristin by meteorologists, caused floods, traffic jams, material damage and power outages. The precipitation gradually increased pore pressure between the mountain and loose masses, adding to the damage of a process of erosion from surface water. This process may have been further hastened by the possible breach of a water pipe, indicated by a housing unit losing its water supply at around 5pm the day previous to the slide. Also, what may have contributed to the incident was a garage that was constructed in the neighbourhood on a fill-in site.

=== The Hatlestad Slide ===
At approximately 1:30 in the morning of 14 September 2005, the cliff over the houses of Hatlestad Terrasse broke apart; the resulting slide of clay, mud, and rocks did not collapse the buildings. The debris flowed through the ground floors of several houses and buried ten people. Occupants on higher floors were not touched by the flowing debris and were then evacuated through non-first floor windows. The municipality and the city hospital were both put on disaster alert, and a large number of emergency responders, including 12 ambulances, were sent to the scene. The first unit to reach the site was a fire engine which arrived only three minutes after the slide, as it was already in the area, having just completed a water draining mission, and it was able to use its siren to awaken residents for the start of an evacuation. In addition to firefighters and paramedics, the Civil Defense and the National Guard also responded. Search dogs were used to locate survivors because heavy machinery could not be deployed due to the unstable nature of the ground; the extraction of buried survivors was made by hand, and with tools such as axes and shovels.

== Aftermath ==
=== Fatalities and wounded ===
A woman (51) who was buried by the slide was dead by the time she was found and recovered at about 7:30. A second woman (27) died in hospital a few days later. A four-year-old, Kristina Hjartåker, died in February the next year. Several more people were wounded by the lack of oxygen while buried.

=== Evacuation and temporary transportation measures ===
Due to the threat of more landslides, residents of the neighbourhood were relocated to neighbors and various hotels around Bergen. A further 128 people in the houses beyond the slide-area found themselves isolated due to the destroyed access road, and had to use a forest trail when evacuated by emergency responders. As this trail would be the only way in and out of the neighbourhood for days, it was paved with gravel. Gaia Trafikk, the city's bus company, set up a short makeshift bus route for the residents to help them get to work. The bus operated between Hamreveien, a minor road at the end of the trail, to the closest bus stop in Osvegen. Vandalism concerns for the abandoned houses caused the police to use floodlights to patrol the area.

==== Søråshøgda inspection ====
The slide also prompted the residents of Søråshøgda, a neighbourhood which also lies in Fana borough, to tell authorities and the state that their houses were unsafe. The police started the evacuation of 14 houses, but canceled the process when a geologist who had been brought in after surveying Hatlestad stated that the area was safe.

=== Media coverage ===
With the exception of the deceased, most notably Kristina Hjartåker, most victims avoided being personally named in the media, with the exception of those who voluntarily gave interviews to papers such as Bergens Tidende and Fanaposten.

=== The neighborhood and monetary compensation ===
The fate of the houses and road taken by the slide, as well as those near them, was at first uncertain. Initially, the municipality considered restoring the housing units and the road and leaving it to the owners of the hill to secure it against landslides. This caused great concern among several Hatlestad residents, who were part in owning the hill which would need securing. It was also a concern that the owners' insurances only covered damage to housing, not securing properties against natural disasters, not to mention that the residents were not eager to return to the site due to the nature of the natural disaster.

On 20 September, a report by the Norwegian consulting engineering company Multiconsult proposed and recommended that the houses in question, 16 in all, should be bought by the municipality and demolished. A new street would be built over the site of the houses hit by the rocks and mud. The hill over the street would be secured by a steel net secured by steel bolts drilled into the ground. Although this was a more costly solution, it was accepted by the municipality.

The housing units were scheduled for purchase and demolishing, except Hatlestad Terrasse 99, situated next to the source of the slide. The housing units below the slide would also be secured against landslides by a concrete wall. Furthermore, the municipality gave the residents new, temporary places to live and monetary compensation. The owners of the housing unit not included in the agreement risked having to move back to his home after his insurance company paid its repairs, which they were very reluctant to do. However, eventually the company decided to take over the house and then hand it over to the municipality for demolishing.

In addition to the victims of the slide, five municipalities in Hordaland county affected by Kristin received a monetary compensation of 24.7 million NOK (approx. four million USD as of June 2007) from the State in December 2005. Of these, Bergen received 18.8 million, of which 12.5 were for the securing of Hatlestad Terrasse after the slide. The remaining 6.3 million would cover economic losses following the Hatlestad Slide, as well as a subsequent slide in Hetlebakken (see Section 4). The other municipalities receiving compensation were Voss Municipality, Fjell Municipality, Vaksdal Municipality and Odda Municipality.

==== Future of abandoned houses ====
On 3 November 2007, Bergens Tidende reported that the municipality had almost completed work on securing the area and was looking for an estate agent to help sell 18 properties, consisting of four empty plots and 14 houses. At this point, the houses had been abandoned for two years and their outdoor areas were in need of maintenance. The municipality also recognized that there was a challenge involved in selling the houses due to the recent history of the neighborhood.

=== Investigation ===
The police would start an investigation, never directed at any single individual, following the landslide. It was closed on 21 November 2005, however, because unlawful acts would have happened too long before the slide. In a press release, the municipality's cabinet leader Monica Mæland apologized for the decision, stating that an investigation would have uncovered all sides of the case.

=== Effect on disaster readiness ===
After the slide, evacuation of residents at risk is routinely considered around the country when areas are considered to be at risk from extreme weather. For example, when extreme precipitation hit Nord-Trøndelag in central Norway in 2006, more than 200 people were evacuated.

In Bergen, a municipality-wide inspection was carried out to map properties potentially at a risk in the event of extreme weather. Securing such areas is still the responsibility of property owners, although there has been discussions on municipalities covering costs of securing properties. Additionally, the slide has changed public sentiments regarding the dangers of building without restrictions.

Finally, in response to the fact that the landslides of Hatlestad and Hetlebakken proved rescue routines after landslides to be unsafe and ineffective, the municipality would establish a 24-man special rescue group to respond to disasters caused by extreme weather. Helge Eidsnes and Tore Kallekleiv of the rescue group voiced budget concerns, stating that recruiting and equipping men for the team would cost about 500,000 NOK (approximately US$82,000 as of June 2007), which according to him was a large amount to the unit.

=== The 'Kristina case' ===
Kristina Hjartåker was a female four-year-old fatally wounded in the Hatlestad slide, and died on 7 February 2006, when her treatment was ended. The question about whether to continue her treatment became a cause célèbre, and caused the Liberal Party of Norway to announce their desire for a 'Kristina Law' that, if passed, will require an independent group to consider discontinuing life-prolonging treatment in cases where a dispute exists. The controversy surrounding the handling of the case, in particular an incident in which doctors from the hospital visited the girl's father at home without invitation to convince him to end her treatment, would cause the leader of the Bergen Health Trust, to retire.

== Other 2005 precipitation-induced damage in West Norway ==
A few days before the Hatlestad slide, a landslide damaged a house elsewhere in Bergen, causing structural damage but no personal injury. Two months later, on 14 November, high precipitation hit again and caused a landslide which killed a construction worker at a construction site in Hetlebakken, Bergen. There were also landslides in the town of Voss, but these caused no damage.

The precipitation also caused a river in the area of Nesttun to swell and cause flood damage. A plan for leading water out of the river come floods was proposed years before Kristin, but has to this day not become a reality, and Nesttun is still at high risk of flood damage come high precipitation. This has upset residents of the area, some of which are demanding that until the issue is resolved, the municipality should be responsible for compensating victims of flood damage in the area.
