= Sør-Trøndelag Police District =

Agency overview
- Formed: 2002
- Preceding agencies: Trondheim PD; Uttrøndelag PD
- Dissolved: 2017
- Superseding agency: Trøndelag PD
- Employees: 570

Jurisdictional structure
- Operations jurisdiction: Sør-Trøndelag, Sør-Trøndelag, Norway
- General nature: Local civilian police

Operational structure
- Overseen by: National Police Directorate
- Headquarters: Sentrum Police Station, Trondheim
- Agency executive: Nils Kristian Moe, Chief of Police

Facilities
- Politistasjon / Lensmannskontors: 20

Website
- https://www.politi.no/sor-trondelag

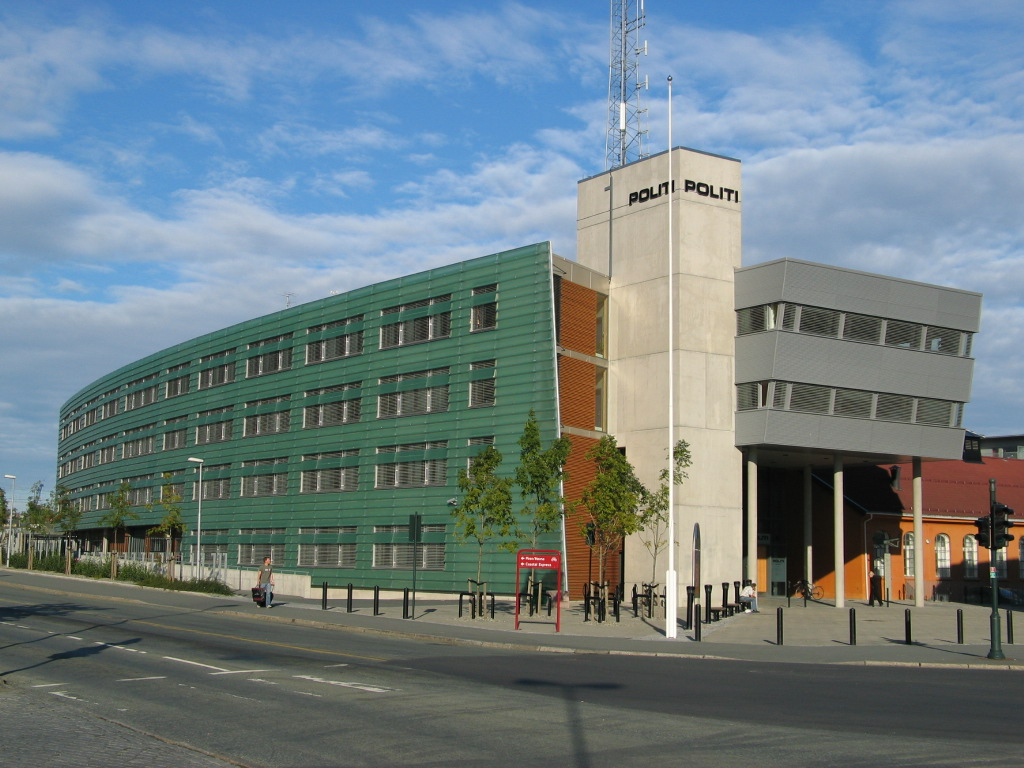
Police Headquarters at Sentrum Police Station, Trondheim.

Sør-Trøndelag Police District (Norwegian: Sør-Trøndelag politidistrikt) was a police district in Norway from 2002 to 2017. It was created when the former Trondheim Police District and Uttrøndelag Police District were merged. It was dissolved in 2017 when it became part of the Trøndelag Police District.

The district covered 23 municipalities, including the cities of Trondheim (Sentrum and Heimdal Police Stations) and Røros and 17 sheriff's offices (lensmannskontor) and two police stations, city center and Heimdal. Management, Incident, Prosecution Section and the main police jail were part of the central Sentrum Police Station in Trondheim. The district served about 260,000 inhabitants with approximately 520 employees, of which 400 were police officers.

== Contact information ==
To contact the police in Sør-Trøndelag by telephone:

- emergency ☎ 112
- non-emergency ☎ 02800
- regular phone number ☎ (+47) 73 89 90 90

== See also ==
Norwegian Police Service
