= Andras Guttormsson =

Prime Miister of the Faroe Islands

Lawman of the Faroe Islands
- In office 1531–1544
- Preceded by: Tórmóður Sigurðsson
- Succeeded by: Guttormur Andrasson

Personal details
- Born: 1490 Norway
- Died: 1544 (aged 53–54)
- Children: Guttormur Andrasson (son)

Andras Guttormsson, (c. 1490 to 1544), was, from 1531 to 1544, lawman (prime minister) of the Faroe Islands.

Andras Guttormsson lived in Kálgarður, Sumba, Faroe Islands, but came from Norway. Andras Guttormsson was the father of Guttormur Andrasson, who followed him in the post.

Political offices
Preceded by Tórmóður Sigurðsson	Lawman of the Faroe Islands; 1531–1544	Succeeded by Guttormur Andrasson
