= Herbjørn Sørebø =

Norwegian journalist and broadcaster (1933–2003)

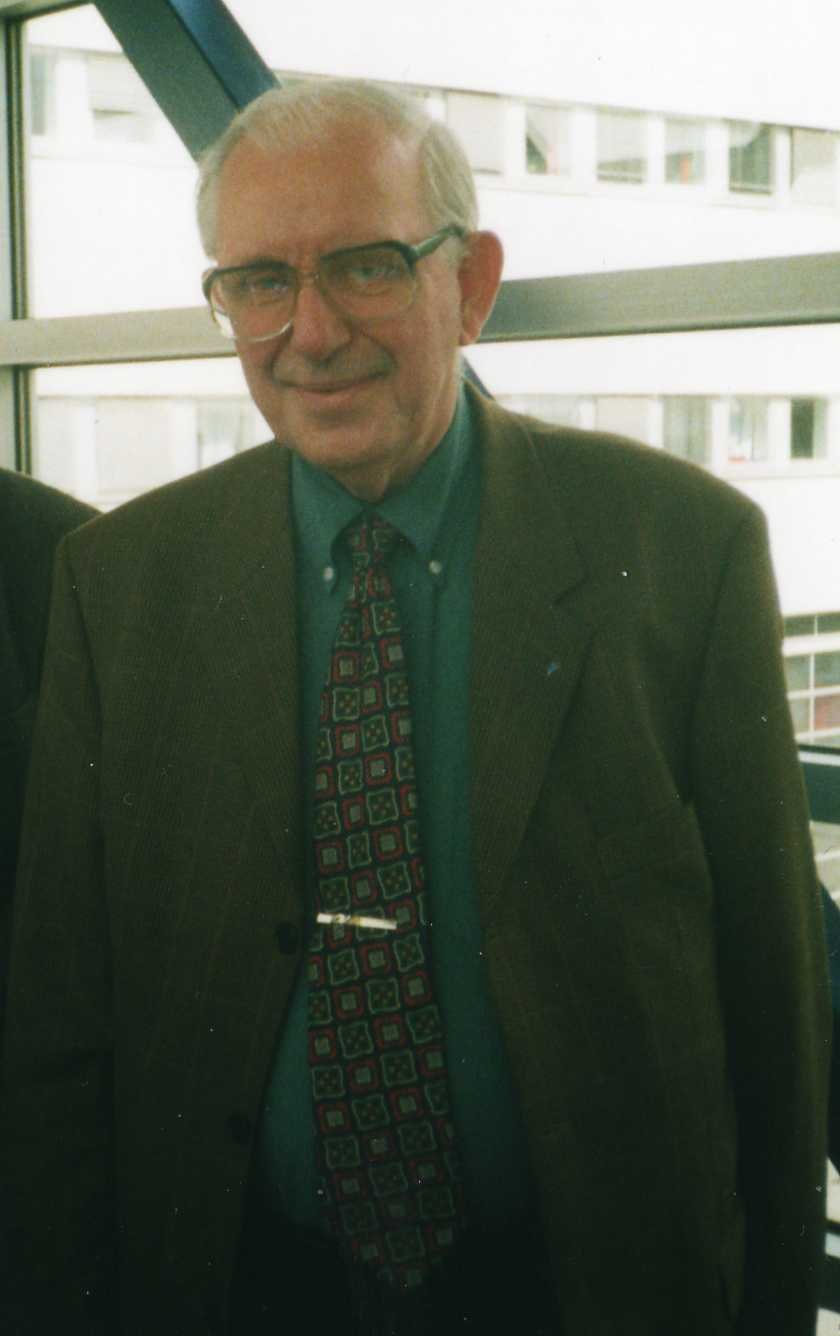
- Born: 25 April 1933; Fjaler Municipality, Norway
- Died: 29 March 2003 (aged 69)
- Occupations: Journalist and broadcasting personality
- Awards: King's Medal of Merit in gold (2003)

Herbjørn Sørebø (25 April 1933 – 29 March 2003) was a Norwegian journalist and broadcasting personality for more than thirty years.

== Biography ==
He was born in Fjaler Municipality. He started working for the Norwegian Broadcasting Corporation in 1964, first for the radio, and later for the television. His speciality was Norwegian politics, as a reporter from the Parliament. From 1988 to 1990 he headed the daily evening news programme Dagsrevyen. Sørebø published more than 40 books during his career. He had his own column in the weekly newspaper Dag og Tid from 1975 until his death in 2003.

He was chairman of the board of the news agency Nynorsk Pressekontor from 1975 to 1985. Among his books is the poetry collection Bønder spelar ikkje tennis from 1972, and the autobiography Medieliv from 2003.

Sørebø retired in the fall of 2001. In 2003, he received the King's Medal of Merit in gold.
