= Jógvan Poulsen =

Prime Minister of the Faroe Islands

Lawman of the Faroe Islands
- In office 1654–1655
- Preceded by: Jógvan Justinusson
- Succeeded by: Balzer Jacobsen
- In office 1662–1677
- Preceded by: Balzer Jacobsen
- Succeeded by: Jákup Jógvansson

Personal details
- Born: Oyri, Faroe Islands
- Relations: Jógvan Justinusson (father-in-law)
- Children: Jákup Jógvansson (son)

Jógvan Poulsen was the Lawman of the Faroe Islands twice, from 1654 to 1655, and from 1662 to 1677.

Jógvan Poulsen was Faroese. He married the daughter of previous Lawman Jógvan Justinusson. Jógvan Poulsen was raised on a farm in Oyri, before he became elected leader of the Lagting. King Frederik III of Denmark did not like Jógvan Poulsen as Lawman and replaced him with the Dane Balzer Jacobsen, one of Christoffer Gabel's supporters. Gabel at this time had a monopoly on trade to and from the Faroe Islands, so this was much better for him. Jacobsen was Lawman until 1661, when Jógvan Poulsen again took over.

His son, Jákup Jógvansson, later also became Lawman of the Faroe Islands.

Political offices
Preceded by Jógvan Justinusson	Lawman of the Faroe Islands; 1654-1655	Succeeded by Balzer Jacobsen
Preceded by Balzer Jacobsen	Lawman of the Faroe Islands; 1662-1677	Succeeded by Jákup Jógvansson
