= Nic Stene =

Norwegian speed skater

Personal information
- Born: 25 May 1921; Trondheim, Norway
- Died: 20 May 2006 (aged 84)

Sport
- Sport: Speed-skating

Nic Stene (25 May 1921 – 20 May 2006) was a Norwegian speed skater, born in Trondheim. He competed at the 1952 Winter Olympics in Oslo, where he placed 15th in the 1,500 m.
