= Jan Einar Greve =

Norwegian lawyer (1933–2022)

Jan Einar Greve (11 May 1933 – 12 January 2022) was a Norwegian lawyer.

== Life and career ==
Greve was born on 11 May 1933. He graduated from the University of Oslo as cand.jur. in 1959, and worked as a solicitor from 1961, and a barrister with a mandate to work with cases in the Supreme Court of Norway from 1963.

He was the chairman of the board of Bergen Bank (1970–1986, including its predecessor Bergens Privatbank), Rieber & Søn (1987–2000), Vesta Forsikring (1988–2003), Høyteknologisenteret (1989–2022) and Bergens Tidende. In 2007 he was proclaimed Knight, First Class of the Royal Norwegian Order of St. Olav. He died on 12 January 2022, at the age of 88.
