= Jacob Hveding =

Prime Minister of the Faroe Islands

Lawman of the Faroe Islands
- In office 1772–1786
- Preceded by: Thorkild Fjeldsted
- Succeeded by: Johan Michael Lund

Personal details
- Occupation: Lawyer

Jacob Hveding was a Norwegian lawyer. From 1772 to 1786 he was Prime Minister of the Faroe Islands. Later, he moved back to Norway, and Stavanger, where he took over as a presiding judge.

Political offices
Preceded by Thorkild Fjeldsted	Prime Minister of the Faroe Islands; 1772-1786	Succeeded by Johan Michael Lund
