= Torkild =

Torkild may refer to:

- Torkild Brakstad (1945–2021), Norwegian football player and coach
- Torkild Garp (1883–1976), Danish gymnast
- Torkild Rieber (1882–1968), Norwegian immigrant to America and Chairman of Texaco
- Torkild Strandberg (born 1970), Swedish politician
