= Per Maltby =

Norwegian astronomer

Per Eugen Maltby (3 November 1933 – 24 May 2006) was a Norwegian astronomer.

He took his cand.real. degree at the University of Oslo in 1957, and was a research assistant there before becoming lecturer at the University of Bergen in 1960.

His specialties were solar physics and radioastronomy. He took the dr.philos. degree in 1964, was appointed as a lecturer of astrophysics at the University of Oslo in 1967, and was a professor from 1983. He published several books, including textbooks. Also contributing to Norway's acquisition of membership in the European Space Agency, at his death he was called "the most important pillar of Norwegian astrophysics and space research over the last 40 years". He was a fellow of the Norwegian Academy of Science and Letters from 1969. and the International Academy of Quantum Molecular Science in 2005.
