= Rolfine Absalonsen =

Norwegian actress (1864–1933)

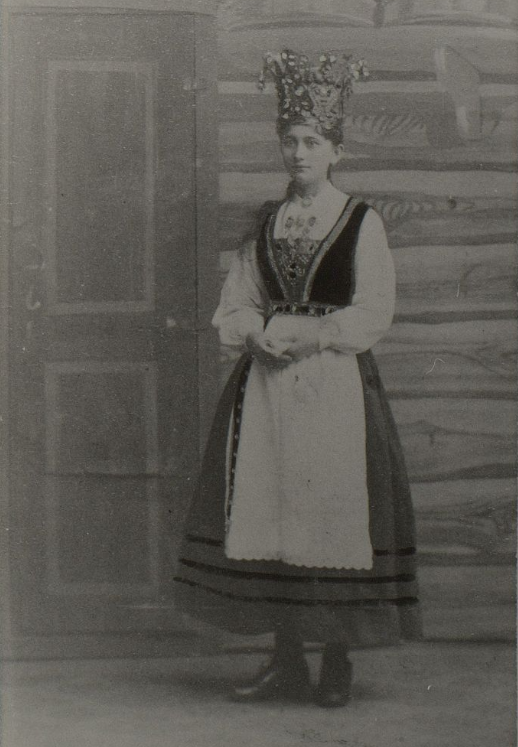
- Rolfine Absalonsen in 1886/1887
- Born: Asseline Rolfine Absalonsen; 10 March 1864; Bergen, Norway
- Died: 9 July 1933 (aged 69); Bekkelagshøgda, Aker, Norway
- Spouse: Hans Henrik Mørch (m. 1886)
- Children: 5

Asseline Rolfine Absalonsen (10 March 1864 – 9 July 1933) was a Norwegian actress and prompter.

== Early and personal life ==
Asseline Rolfine Absalonsen was born on 10 March 1864 in Bergen to master cooper Absalon Julius Absalonsen (1836–1898) and Karen Lucie Christiansen (1837–1897). On 2 October 1891, she married actor Hans Henrik Mørch. They had 5 children together.

== Career ==
On 31 March 1886, Absalonsen made her debut with at the Den Nationale Scene in the play En Omvej. Her debut was well received and after the fall of the curtain she was "called with a lot of life".

From 1886 to 1887, she toured with Jenny Widgren-Norrby's theatre company. The company consisted of mostly amateur actors associated with the Victoria Theatre (Centralteatret) in Akersgaten. The tour took the company from Bergen, on through the small towns along the coast, to Christiania (now Oslo). From there, the journey continued to Sweden, where the company finally dissolved.

Absalonsen also performed at the Olympen Theatre, as well as performing in Lillestrøm and Drammen. Later, she was employed as a prompter at the Den Nationale Scene, along with her husband, who later stated "I would not wish my worst enemy to become a prompter".

== Death ==
Absalonsen died on 9 July 1933 in Bekkelagshøgda, at the age of 69.
