= Torkelsen =

Surname list

Torkelsen and Torkelson are Norwegian and Danish patronymic surnames which may refer to:

== People ==
- Red Torkelson (1894–1964), American professional baseball pitcher
- Eric Torkelson (born 1952), American football running back
- John M. Torkelson, American physicist
- Paul Torkelson (born 1952), American politician and a member of the Minnesota House of Representatives
- Spencer Torkelson (born 1999), American professional baseball infielder
- Per Inge Torkelsen (1953–2021), Norwegian comic, author, radio personality

== Other ==
- The Torkelsons, American television sitcom
