= Tor Torkildsen =

Norwegian writer (1932–2006)

Tor Torkildsen (3 June 1932, Trondheim – 8 July 2006) was a Norwegian seaman and ship-owner who changed career to novelist in his 60s.

The family shipping company Torkildsen went bankrupt in 1977, and he took up writing while residing in Scotland, later returning to Trondheim. In the 1980s he was a copywriter for Stentofon, but the company went under and Torkildsen turned to writing full-time. Writing about life at sea was something he found natural, but he had to do research on certain land locations such as Greenland at Trondheim Public Library. After writing several scripts in English, he was rejected by several British publishing houses. Translating one script to Norwegian, he was picked as a writer up by Aschehoug after taking part in one of their thriller literature contests, despite not winning the contest.

His debut thriller novel, Stella Baltica, was published in 1994, followed by Dødt skip in 1995 and På død manns kiste in 1996. In 1995 he also debuted as a young adult fiction writer in the adventure genre, releasing Piratene på Bali followed by Gullskatten på revet (1996).

Torkildsen's thrillers were issued by Aschehoug and the young adult fiction books by Cappelen. Torkildsen was then contracted to Bladkompaniet to write the pocket book series Brenning. The first 18 Brenning books were printed in a circulation of 200,000.
