= Gunvor Krogsæter =

Norwegian politician (born 1933)

Gunvor Krogsæter (born 1 November 1933) is a Norwegian politician and member of the Liberal Party.

She served as a deputy representative to the Norwegian Parliament from Møre og Romsdal during the 1981–1985 term. In total she met during 26 days of parliamentary session.
