= Bugge =

Bugge is a Norwegian surname and may refer to:

== People ==
- Agnes Bugge (born pre-1417), English brewer
- Alexander Bugge (1870-1929), Norwegian historian
- Anders Bugge (1889-1955), Norwegian theologist and art historian
- Anna Bugge (1862-1928), Norwegian and Swedish feminist, lawyer, diplomat and politician
- Anne Bugge-Paulsen (born 1979), Norwegian international footballer
- Ashley Bugge (born 1983), American writer
- Bugge Wesseltoft (born 1964), Norwegian jazz musician
- Carl Bugge (1881-1968), Norwegian geologist
- David Buggé (born 1956), English cricketer and banker
- Espen Bugge Pettersen (born 1980), Norwegian footballer and sport administrator
- Eva Bugge (born 1945), Norwegian diplomat
- Frederik Moltke Bugge (1806-1853), Norwegian philologist and educator
- Frederik Moltke Bugge (barrister) (1923-2001), Norwegian barrister and businessperson
- Fredrik Moltke Bugge (1865-1938), Norwegian barrister and politician
- Geirulf Bugge (1862-1940), Norwegian judge
- Heuch Bugge (1883-1972), Norwegian barrister
- Ingeborg Wærn Bugge (1899-1991), Swedish architect
- Jan Bugge-Mahrt (born 1954), Norwegian diplomat
- Jens Bugge (1930-2014), Norwegian judge
- Jens Andreas Hjorth Bugge (1859-1939), Norwegian ship-owner
- Karl Ludvig Bugge (civil servant) (1902-1981), Norwegian civil servant
- Karl Ludvig Bugge (actor) (1915-1987), Norwegian actor, screenwriter and journalist
- Kathrine Bugge (1877-1951), Norwegian educator, cultural worker and politician
- Kitty Bugge (1878-1938), Norwegian feminist and union leader
- Niels-Ulrik Bugge (born 1943), Danish politician
- Peter Olivarius Bugge (1764–1849), Norwegian bishop and politician
- Sophus Bugge (1833–1907), a Norwegian philologist and linguist
- Stein Bugge (1896-1961), Norwegian playwright, theatre theorist and theatre director
- Sverre Bugge (born 1953), Norwegian politician
- Thomas Bugge (1740–1815), Danish astronomer, mathematician and surveyor
- Thomas Bugge (born 1988), Norwegian musician in the pop and rap duo Robin og Bugge
- Thorolf Bugge (1879-1935), Norwegian trade unionist and politician
- Vegard Robinson Bugge (born 1989), Norwegian professional cyclist
- Vivian Knarvik Bugge (born 1960), Norwegian politician
- Wilhelm Bugge (1838-1896), Norwegian theologian and politician
- Wilhelm Bugge (1892-1972), Norwegian barrister and businessperson
- William A. Bugge (1900-1992), American civil engineer

== Other uses ==
- Bugge Islands, Antarctica
