= Frederik Moltke Bugge (barrister) =

Norwegian barrister and businessperson

Frederik Moltke Bugge (6 October 1923 – 2001) was a Norwegian barrister and businessperson.

== Personal life ==
Bugge was born in Kristiania, son of barrister Wilhelm Bugge and Gudrun Gundersen, brother of Supreme Court Justice Jens Bugge, grandson of barrister Fredrik Moltke Bugge, great-grandson of bishop Frederik Wilhelm Klumpp Bugge, great-great-grandson of educator Frederik Moltke Bugge and great-great-great-grandson of bishop Peter Olivarius Bugge. On the maternal side he was a great-grandson of bishop Johan Christian Heuch and second cousin of Hanne Heuch.

In 1949 he married Mary Baldwin Gundersen, a physician's daughter and native of La Crosse, Wisconsin. The couple had two daughters and two sons, born between 1950 and 1959. They resided at Blommenholm, later at Montebello.

== Career ==
Bugge finished his secondary education in 1941. During the occupation of Norway by Nazi Germany, he fled the country for Sweden enrolling in the Norwegian police troops from1944 to 1945 and decorated with the Defence Medal 1940–1945. After the war he graduated from the University of Oslo with the cand.jur. degree in 1947, and after studying French and history at the Free University of Brussels in 1948, he served one year as a deputy judge in Ringerike District Court. He then spent a few years in the United States, working for Alcoa Steamship Company from 1949 to 1951. He took a translator's exam that year, and spent the following two years as consultant for the Norwegian America Line.

In 1953 he was hired as a solicitor in the law firm ran by his father and Peter Platou Stabell; Stabell was later succeeded by Erling Christiansen. Bugge was created partner in the firm in 1958, but in 1966 he joined Lars Arentz-Hansen and Knut Rasmussen to establish the new law firm Bugge, Arentz-Hansen og Rasmussen (BA-HR). BA-HR became one of Norway's most prestigious law firms. Bugge retired in 1991.

Bugge chaired Union Co from 1965 to 1980, Norsk Aluminium Company, Norsk Elektrisk & Brown Boveri, Volvo Norge and Arendal Smelteverk, and was a board member of Standard Telefon og Kabelfabrik, Årdal og Sunndal Verk, Fabritius Gruppen and Ilmenittsmelteverket in Tyssedal. He was a supervisory council member of Morgenbladet, deputy supervisory council member of Den norske Creditbank and corporate council member of Storebrand-Norden. He died in March 2001.
