= Heuch Bugge =

Norwegian barrister

Johan Christian Heuch Bugge (15 April 1883 – 3 July 1972) was a Norwegian barrister.

== Personal life ==
He was born in Stavanger to Christian August Bugge (1853–1928) and Dina Alette Danielsen. This was the Mandal lineage of the Bugge family. Heuch Bugge was a nephew of Supreme Court Justice Geirulf Bugge, civil servant Erling Bugge and businessperson Jens Andreas Hjorth Bugge, brother of art historian Anders Ragnar Bugge and first cousin of tax director Karl Ludvig Bugge.

He married Eldbjørg Due, daughter of stock exchange commissioner Reidar Due (1862–1953), in 1918. They had three daughters. He was also an uncle of politician Reidar Due.

== Career ==
After middle school in Kongsberg he attended school in Giessen and Leipzig, Germany, before moving to Kristiania. He finished his secondary education at Frogner School in 1901, took officer's training in 1902 and graduated from the Royal Frederick University with the cand.jur. degree in 1907. He worked as junior solicitor in Hamar, then deputy judge in Numedal and Sandsvær from 1908 to 1910. He was again a junior solicitor in Kristiania until 1913, then an attorney in Vikersund for some time before finally settling in Kristiania.

He became a barrister in 1916, and after working as judicial consultant and board secretary in De-No-Fa from 1918, he started his own law firm in 1924. In 1930 it was expanded with the barristers Christopher Frederick Hawkins Borchgrevink and Sandborg, creating the firm Bugge, Borchgrevink og Sandborg which had downtown offices in Øvre slottsgate 14. Among others he was active in the legal purge in Norway after World War II, as a public defender of Peter Harsem, Svein Svendsen, and Ulrich Stang.

He was chairman of the board of the companies Lille Frøens Tomteselskap and Norsk Papirtextil, and board member of Norflex Glidelåsfabrikk, Norske Zinkprodukter, Nordenfjeldske Teglverk and Dreyers Forlag. He chaired the supervisory council of Oslo Handelsbank.

He was decorated with the Norwegian Defence Medal 1940–1945. He died in July 1972. His funeral took place at Vestre gravlund.
