= Jens Bugge =

Norwegian judge (1930–2014)

Jens Bugge (10 May 1930 – 9 November 2014) was a Norwegian judge.

He was born in Oslo as a son of barrister Wilhelm Bugge and brother of barrister Frederik Moltke Bugge. He was a grandson of barrister Fredrik Moltke Bugge, great-grandson of bishop Frederik Wilhelm Klumpp Bugge, great-great-grandson of educator Frederik Moltke Bugge and great-great-great-grandson of bishop Peter Olivarius Bugge. On the maternal side he was a great-grandson of bishop Johan Christian Heuch and second cousin of Hanne Heuch.

He worked as a barrister with access to working with Supreme Court cases from 1965, as a presiding judge from 1978 to 1982 and a Supreme Court Justice from 1982 to 2000.

He was a board member of the Norwegian Mountain Touring Association from 1969, and board chairman from 1975 to 1980. He chaired the Intelligence Oversight Committee from 1984 to 1988.

He resided in Blommenholm. He died in November 2014.
