= Wilhelm Bugge (barrister) =

Norwegian barrister and businessperson

Fredrik Wilhelm Bugge (7 July 1893 – 30 July 1972) was a Norwegian barrister and businessperson.

== Personal life ==
He was born in Kristiania as a son of barrister Fredrik Moltke Bugge (1865–1938) and Kristine Elisabeth Heuch. He was a grandson of bishop Frederik Wilhelm Klumpp Bugge, great-grandson of educator Frederik Moltke Bugge, great-great-grandson of bishop Peter Olivarius Bugge and great-grandnephew of Søren Bruun Bugge. On the maternal side he was a grandson of bishop Johan Christian Heuch.

In 1922 he married barrister's daughter Gudrun Gundersen. They had the sons Frederik Moltke Bugge, barrister, and Jens Bugge, Supreme Court Justice.

== Career ==
After finishing his secondary education in 1911, he graduated from the Royal Frederick University with the cand.jur. degree in 1915. He was a deputy judge in Lillehammer and Fredrikstad from 1916 to 1917, junior solicitor from 1917 to 1922, and barrister with access to Supreme Court cases from 1922. From 1923 he was a law firm partner with barrister Herman Christiansen.

He was a board member of Sauda Smelteverk from 1920, Meråker Smelteverk from 1928, Høyanger Aluminiumsverk and Nordisk Aluminiumsindustri, Holmestrand from 1939, Norsk Elektrisk & Brown Boveri from 1941, Det Norske Nitrid from 1947, Den norske Creditbank and Forsikringsselskapet Norden. He was a supervisory council member of Arendal Smelteverk, Det Norske Garantiselskap, Borregaard and Morgenbladet. He died in July 1972.

External image
- Portrait
