= Knut Rasmussen =

Knut Rasmussen may refer to:

- Knud Rasmussen (1879–1933), Danish explorer
- Knut Rasmussen (physician) (born 1938), Norwegian professor of medicine
- Knut Rasmussen (barrister), Norwegian barrister
