= Anders Daae =

Anders Daae may refer to:

- Anders Daae (prison director) (1838–1910), Norwegian prison director
- Anders Daae (priest) (1680–1763), Norwegian priest and landowner
- Anders Daae (physician) (1852–1924), Norwegian-American physician
