= Fredrik Moltke Bugge =

Norwegian barrister and politician (1865–1938)

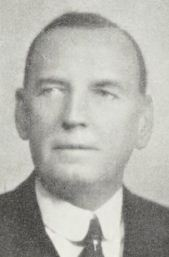
Fredrik Moltke Bugge.

Frederik Moltke Bugge (16 January 1865 – 8 November 1938) was a Norwegian barrister and politician.

== Personal life ==
He was born in Haram Municipality as a son of bishop Frederik Wilhelm Klumpp Bugge and Edvardine Magdalene Margrethe Daae. He was a grandson of educator Frederik Moltke Bugge, grandnephew of professor Søren Bruun Bugge and great-grandson of bishop Peter Olivarius Bugge. On the maternal side he was a nephew of physician Anders Daae.

In 1892 he married Kristine Elisabeth Heuch, a daughter of Johan Christian Heuch. He was the father of barrister Wilhelm Bugge, and grandfather of barrister Frederik Moltke Bugge and Supreme Court Justice Jens Bugge.

== Career ==
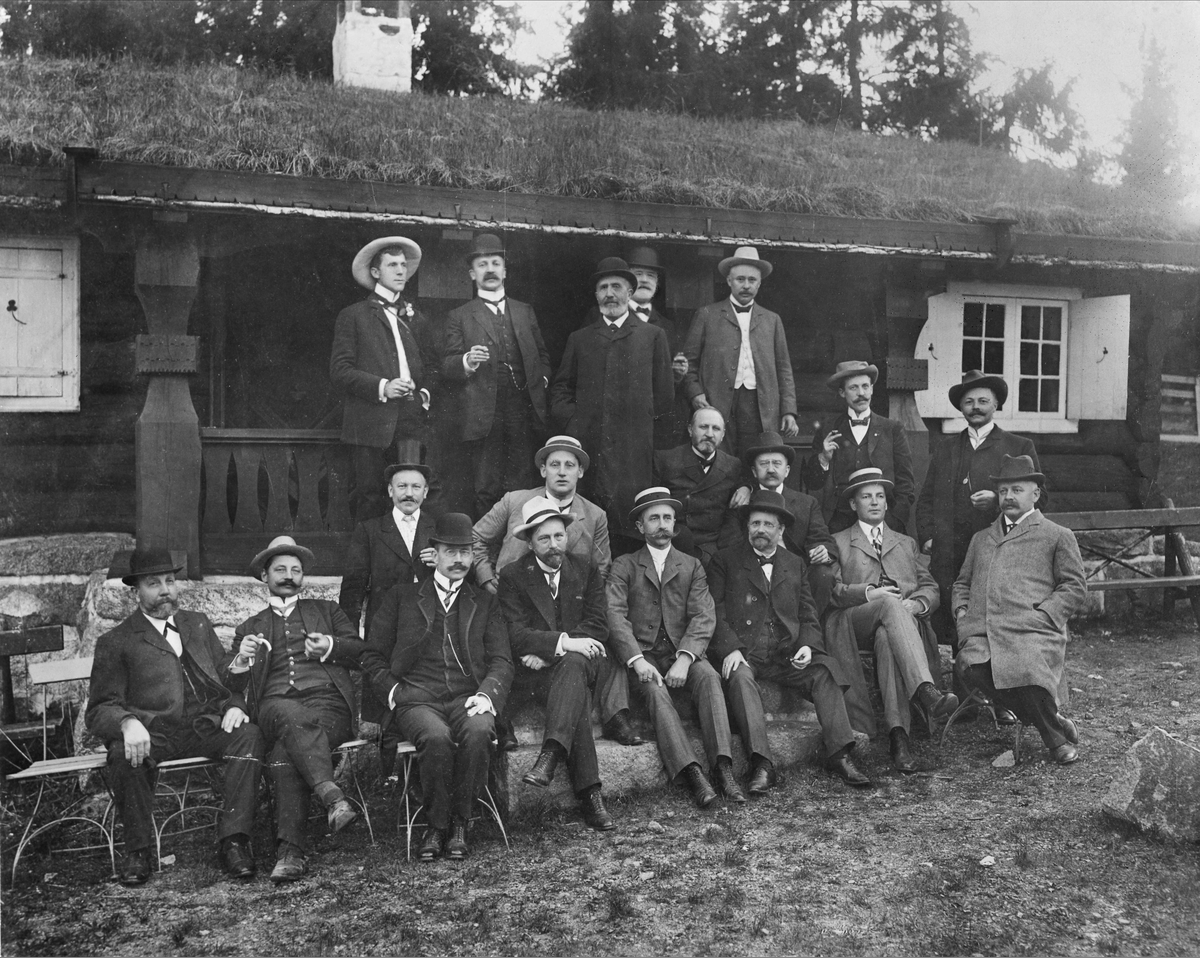
Oslo city council at Frognerseteren in 1908. Fredrik is second from right in the front row.

He finished his secondary education in 1882 and graduated with the cand.jur. degree in 1889. He was a deputy judge at the Fredrikstad District Court and junior solicitor under Jacob Holm before working as a barrister from 1893 with his own law firm from 1895.

He also served as deputy mayor of Kristiania in 1905 and mayor of Kristiania from 1906 to 1908. He was a board member of the Norwegian Bar Association from 1900 to 1912, of Norske Liv from 1912 and of the supervisory council in Vinmonopolet from 1923. He was decorated as a Knight, First Class of the Order of St. Olav, Commander, First Class of the Order of the Dannebrog and the Legion of Honour. He died in 1938.

Political offices
Preceded by Johan Kristian Skougaard	Mayor of Oslo; 1906–1908	Succeeded by Olaf Berg
