= Piene =

Piene is a surname. Notable people with the surname include:

- Chloe Piene (born 1972), American visual artist
- Johannes Christian Piene (1832–1912), Norwegian businessman and politician
- Otto Piene (1928–2014), German-American artist
- Ragni Piene (born 1947), Norwegian mathematician
