= Magnell =

Magnell is a Swedish surname. Notable people with the surname include:

- Agnes Magnell (1878–1966), Swedish architect
- Ola Magnell (1946–2020), Swedish pop-rock singer and guitarist
