= Jens Ulltveit-Moe =

Norwegian businessperson (born 1942)

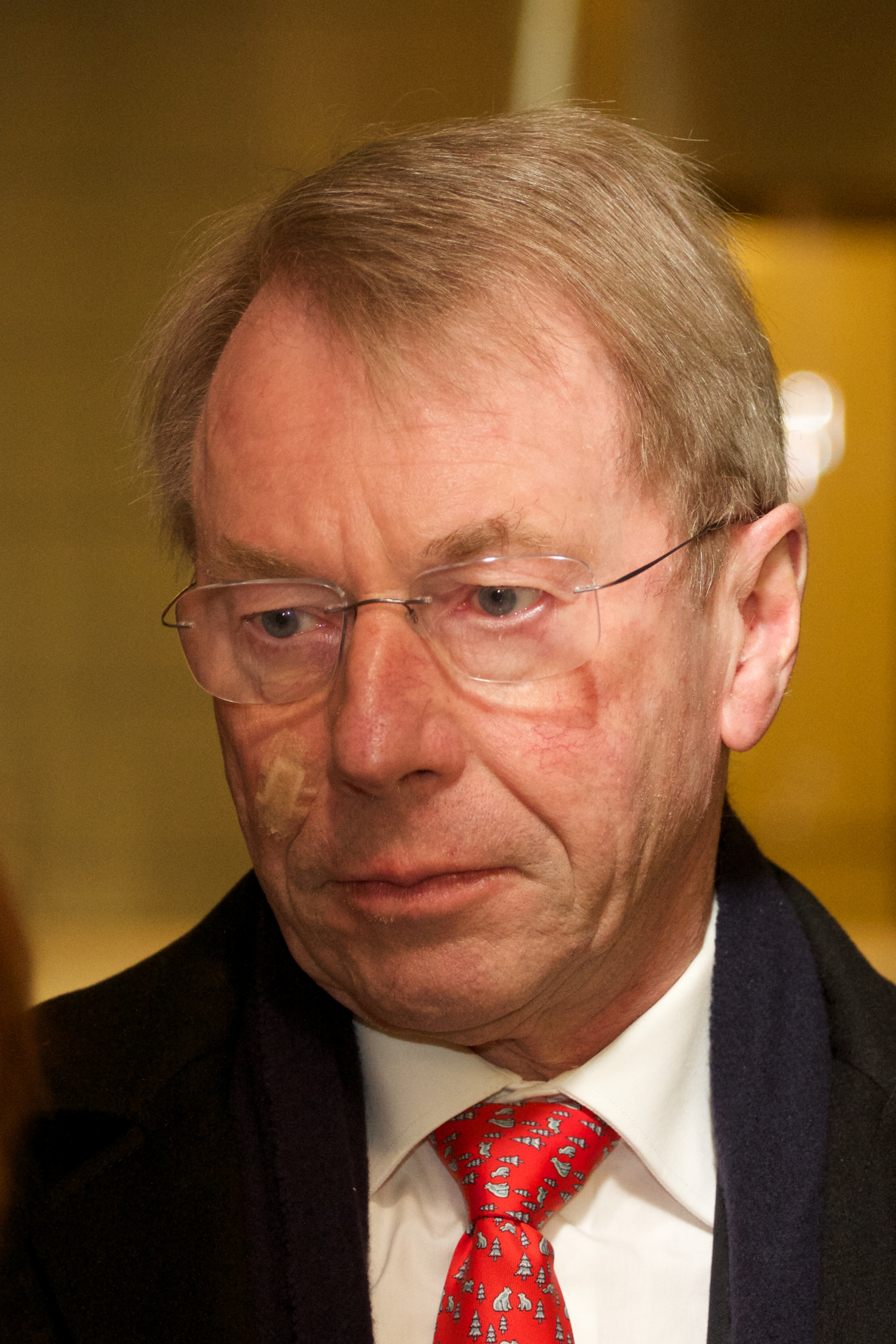
- Ulltveit-Moe in February 2014
- Born: 16 July 1942
- Political party: Green Party

Jens Ulltveit-Moe (born July 16, 1942 in Drammen) is a Norwegian businessperson. He founded Umoe in 1984, and retains ownership of the group. Ulltveit-Moe is CEO of Umoe, and was formerly Chairman of Petroleum Geo-Services.

He is a multi-millionare, with a fortune of NOK 2.6 billion (US$228 million in 2025).

== Biography ==
Ulltveit-Moe was educated at the Norwegian School of Economics in Bergen and School of International and Public Affairs, Columbia University in the United States.

Umoe was founded as Ulltveit-Moe-gruppen in 1984, and had various investments mainly related to shipbuilding and engineering. These were sold, and instead Umoe ventured into catering through Umoe Catering.

From 2000 until 2004, Ulltveit-Moe has been president of Confederation of Norwegian Enterprise. In 2003, he was widely criticized for a deal with the son of the former president of Iran, Mehdi Hashemi Rafsanjani, in 1997. He was also criticized for supporting Statoil CEO, Olav Fjell, in the Statoil corruption case, where Rafsanjani was also involved.

In 2008 he sold the Knutsen OAS tanker fleet and started investing in renewable energy. Umoe Bioenergy cultivates sugarcane in Brazil for the production of 230 000 tonnes of bioethanol per year.

Umoe Solar was developing a facility for the production of 5 000 tonnes of poly-silicon in Miramichi, Canada.^{[1]} In May 2010 the project was postponed until an unknown date.

Ulltveit-Moe donated NOK 70 million for the creation of a climate house in Oslo to communicate research-based knowledge about global warming, especially to youth.

Preceding the 2025 Norwegian parliamentary election, Ulltveit-Moe gave NOK 1 million to the Liberal Party.

He is a member of the Norwegian Academy of Technological Sciences.

The magazine Kapital estimated his fortune to be NOK 2.6 billion in 2024 (US$228 million 2025). Through his company Umoe, Ulltveit-Moe owns a stake in the liberal think-tank Civita.
