= Lars Arentz-Hansen =

Norwegian barrister and mountain climber

Lars Arentz-Hansen (17 November 1927 – 23 March 2009) was a Norwegian barrister.

He was born in Kristiansund and took the cand.jur. degree in 1951. In 1966 he established the law firm Bugge, Arentz-Hansen og Rasmussen (BA-HR) together with Knut Rasmussen and Frederik Moltke Bugge, which became one of Norway's most prestigious law firms.

He also chaired the mountaineering society Norsk Tindeklub from 1966 to 1969.
