= Johan Christian Heuch Sr. =

Norwegian politician (1794–1843)

Johan Christian Heuch (12 November 1794 – 22 May 1843) was a Norwegian merchant and politician.

A merchant based in the coastal town of Kragerø, his father Peter Andreas Heuch was among the wealthiest persons in Southern Norway. He was elected to the Norwegian Parliament in 1833 and 1836, representing the constituency of Kragerø og Østerisør.

He was married to Christine Elisabeth Bonnevie (1803–1863), and was the father of bishop and politician Johan Christian Heuch.
