= Johan Michael Keyser =

Norwegian theologian and bishop (1749–1810)

Right Reverend Johan Michael Keyser
- Bishop of Christianssand
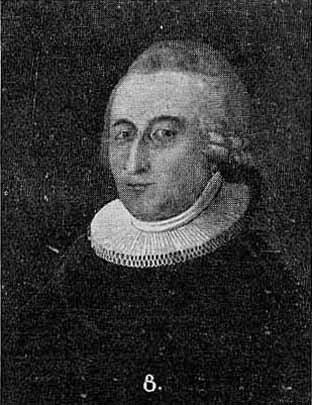
- Church: Church of Norway
- Diocese: Diocese of Christianssand
- Appointed: 1805
- In office: 1805–1810

Personal details
- Born: 15 January 1749 Drammen, Norway
- Died: 1 December 1810 (aged 61)
- Denomination: Christian
- Children: Rudolf Keyser, Christian Nicolai Keyser, Fredrik Wilhelm Keyser
- Occupation: Priest

Johan Michael Keyser (15 January 1749–1 December 1810) was a Norwegian theologian and priest. He served as the Bishop of the Diocese of Christianssand from 1805 until his death in 1810.

== Personal life ==
Keyser was born on 15 January 1749 in Bragernes in Drammen, Norway to the businessman Christen Nielsen and his wife Anna Rosine Keyser. His mother was from the Keyser family from Frankfurt am Main. When Johan was young, he became an orphan and was raised by his maternal grandmother, which is why Johan took his mother's maiden name as his last name. He was married twice. The first marriage was in 1781 to Karen Frederikke Vilhelmine Poppe. She died after 6 years of marriage. He then married Kirsten Margarethe Wangensteen in 1792. He was the father to professor Fredrik Wilhelm Keyser, historian Rudolf Keyser and theologian Christian Nicolai Keyser. He is also the uncle to the scientist Jens Jacob Keyser.

== Education and career ==
Growing up, he was taught by the priest Peder Hesselberg, one first of the Herrnhutterne in Norway. He received his Cand.philol. degree in 1766 from the Frederiksborg School. After this, he held several different teaching positions. In 1777, he received the recommendation of the Bishop Christen Schmidt to become the resident chaplain in the parish of Ullensaker. After 14 years there, in 1791 he moved to Christiania to become the prison priest at the Christiania Tugthus (prison). In 1795, he got a new job as the parish priest in Aker, a position that included being the palace priest for the royal family. Ten years later, he was appointed to be the Bishop of the Diocese of Christianssand. By this time, however he was getting old and in poor health, so he accomplished little. He died on 1 December 1810, after about five years as bishop.

The Danish historian D. Thrap said of him: He was a gentle, meek, pervasive personality who won the hearts of people everywhere. The simple man understood him, and the learned people did not feel bored by hearing him.

Church of Norway titles
Preceded by Jens Bloch	Bishop of Christianssand; 1805–1810	Succeeded by Christian Sørenssen
