= Karl Ludvig Bugge (civil servant) =

Norwegian civil servant

Karl Ludvig Erlingsøn Bugge (7 April 1902 – 29 January 1981) was a Norwegian civil servant.

== Personal life ==
He was born in Kristiania as a son of civil servant Erling Bugge (1867–1957) and Signe Bugge (1867–1941). This was the Mandal lineage of the Bugge family. He was a nephew of priest Christian August Bugge, Supreme Court Justice Geirulf Bugge and ship-owner Jens Andreas Hjorth Bugge, and a first cousin of barrister Heuch Bugge and art historian Anders Ragnar Bugge.

In 1925 he married Anne Beate Evang, a sister of Karl Evang.

== Career ==
He finished his secondary education in 1920, and graduated from the Royal Frederick University with the cand.jur. degree in 1924. He served as a deputy judge from 1925 to 1927, then as a secretary in Riksskattestyret. He was promoted to office manager in 1935, subdiretor in 1946 and ultimately served as director of the Norwegian Tax Administration (Tax Director) from 1948 to 1969.

He was also a noted academic in tax law, publishing Om beskatning av aksjeselskaper (1933; reissued three times), Skatterett I (1946) and Engangsskatten i praksis (1946). He also took over, from Jens Edvard Thomle, the editing of the Norwegian tax laws with commentaries. From 1956 he cooperated with Bj. Skreiberg. He died in 1981.

Government offices
Preceded by Per Berg Lund	Director of the Norwegian Tax Administration; 1948–1969	Succeeded by Syver Fagernæs
