= Umoe =

Norwegian holding company

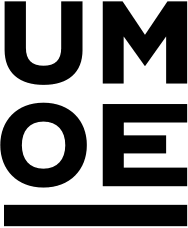
- Founded: 1984; 4 March 1991
- Headquarters: Norway

Umoe AS is a privately owned company based in Norway.

Jens Ulltveit-Moe founded the company in 1984, and it has since grown into one of the largest, privately owned companies in Norway with a market value of approximately NOK 5 billion. In 2010, the company had a turnover of NOK 6,969 million, with 7,100 employees and capital employed of NOK 5,355 million. The company has four main areas: Umoe Shipping and Energy, Umoe Maritime, Umoe Bioenergy, and Umoe Restaurant Group.

== Images of Umoe's activities ==
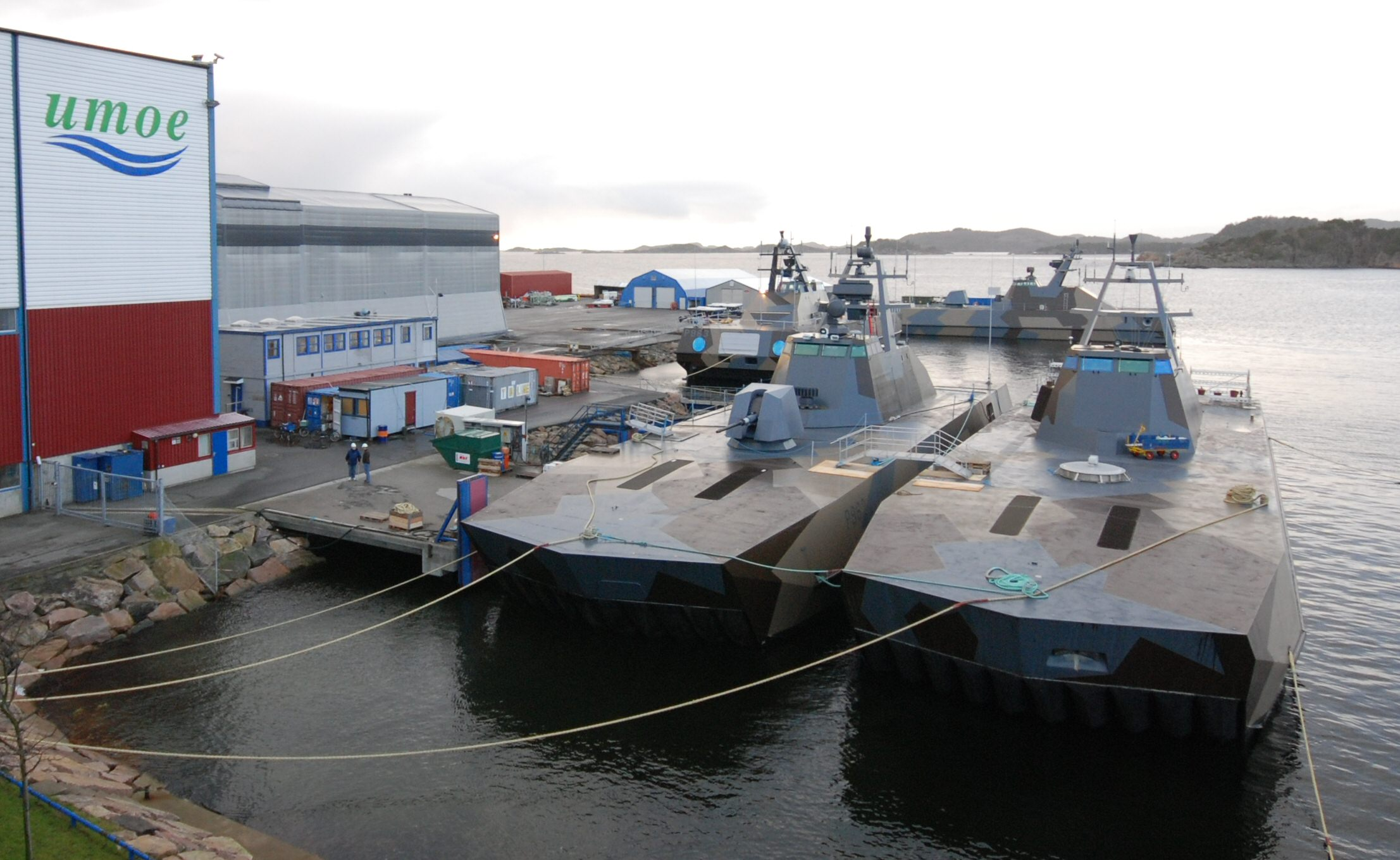
Umoe Shipping
Skjold class

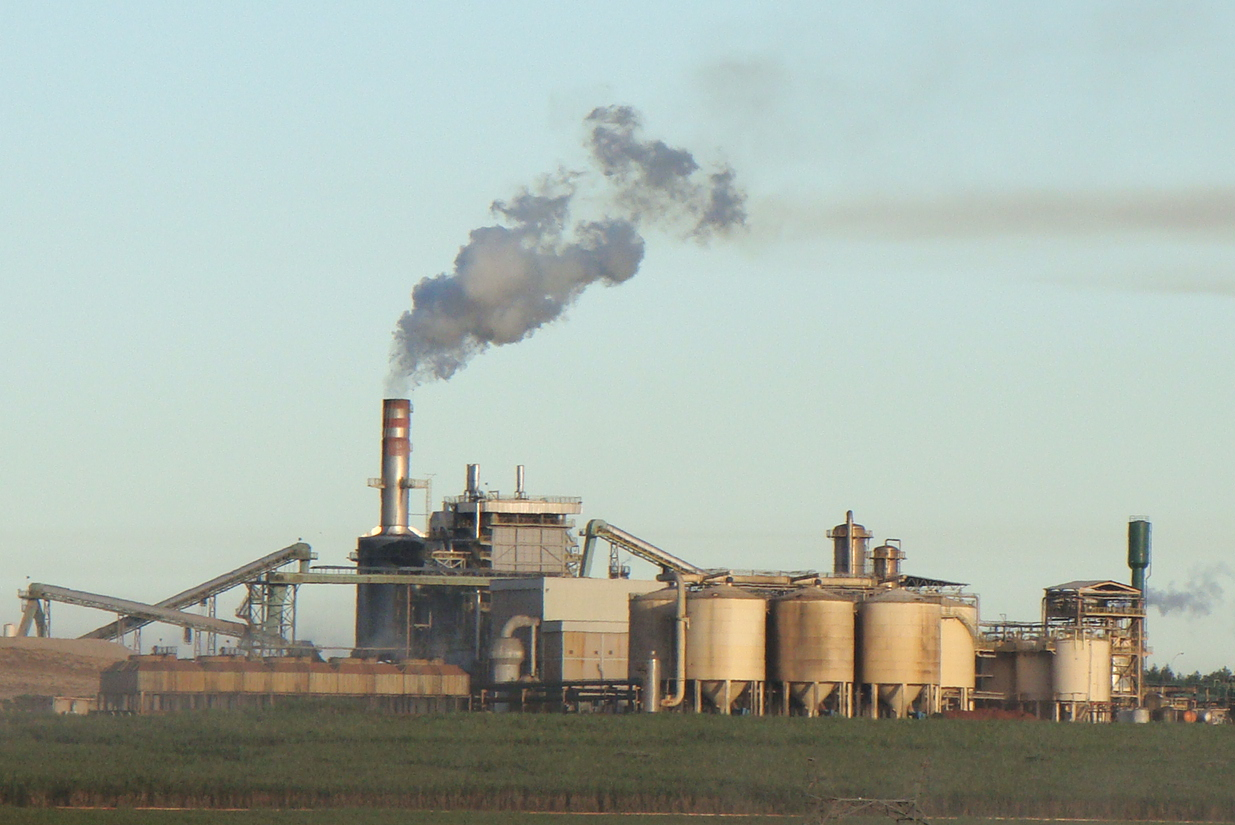
Umoe Bioenergy
Distillery in Brazil

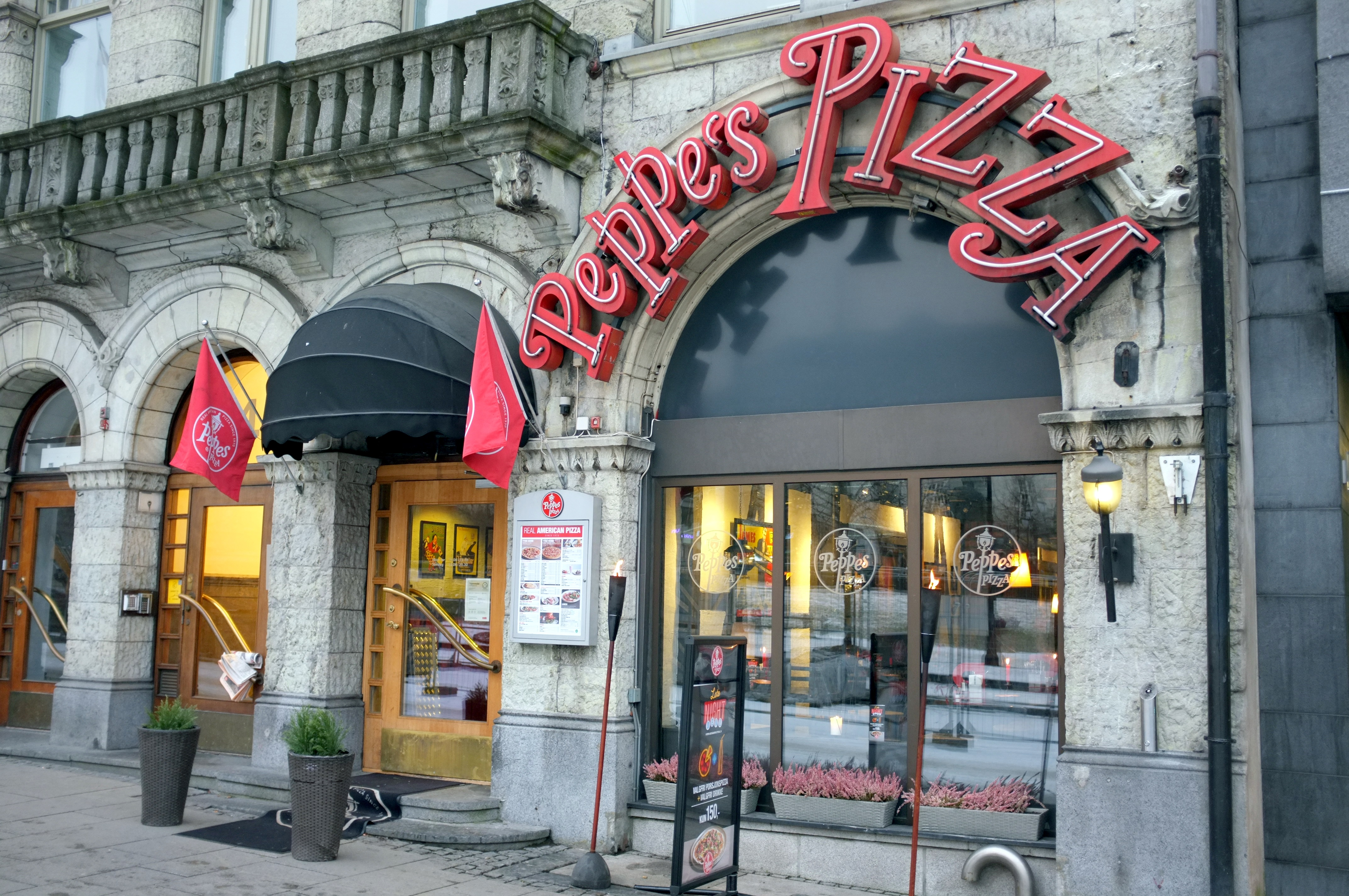
Umoe Restaurants
Peppes Pizza, Oslo

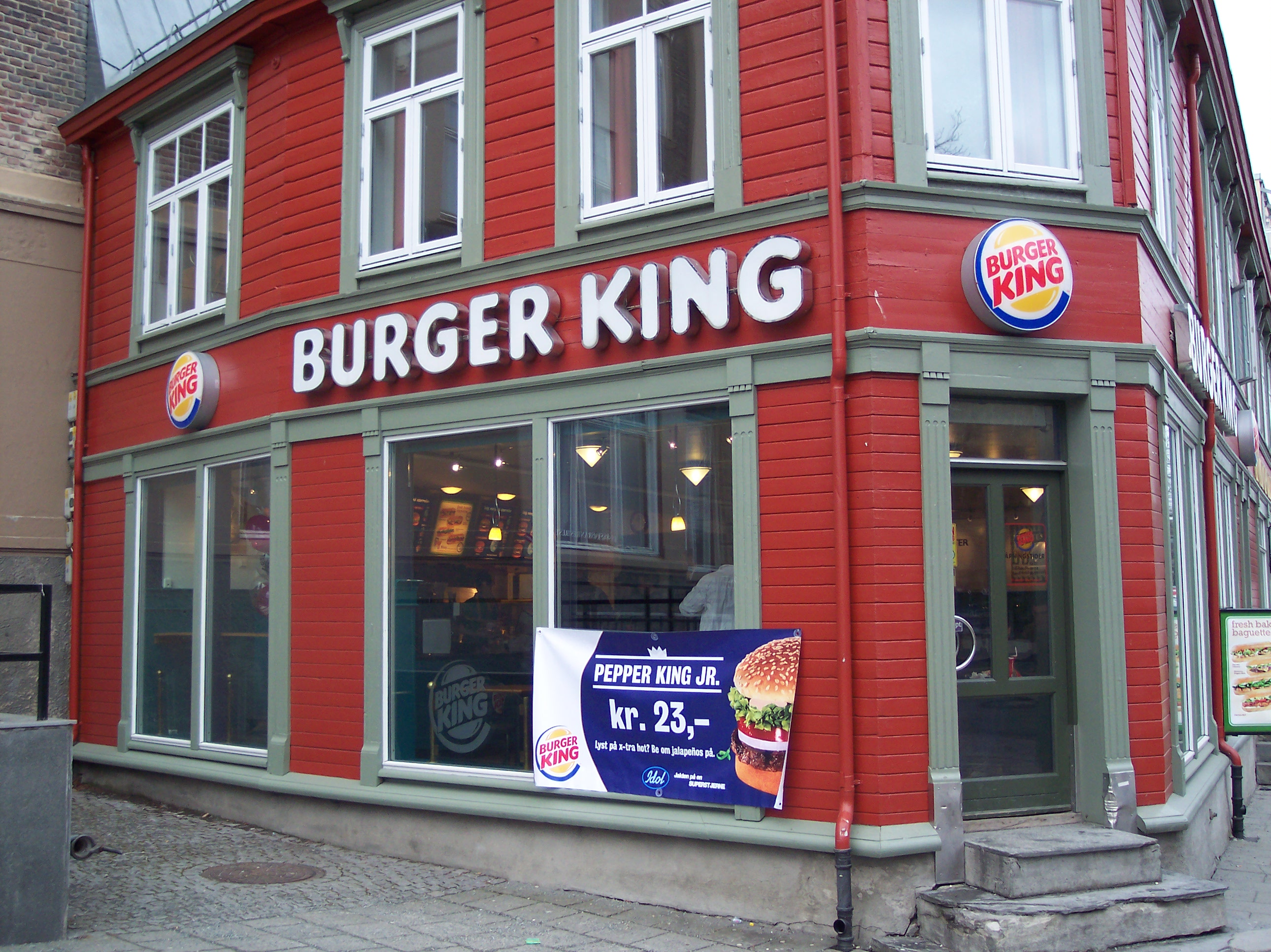
King Food Norway
Burger King, Trondheim

== See also ==
- Umoe Mandal
