= Ingeborg Wærn Bugge =

Swedish architect

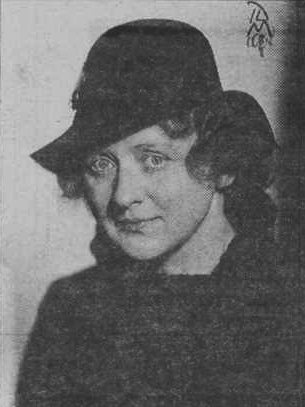
- Born: 5 March 1899; Oslo
- Died: 26 January 1991 (aged 91)
- Education: Royal Institute of Technology; Royal Institute of Art
- Occupation: Architect
- Practice: Folke Bensow; Wærn Bugge, Göransson-Ljungman

Ingeborg Wærn Bugge (5 March 1899 – 26 January 1991) was a Swedish architect. She was one of the first formally educated female architects in Sweden. She designed residential buildings and schools, and worked on renovation projects for churches.

== Biography ==
She was born in Oslo as the daughter of shipowner Dagfinn Bugge and Elisabeth Wærn. After her parents divorced, she moved with her mother and brother to Gothenburg in 1902, and from there to Stockholm. She graduated her higher secondary education in 1918 with top marks in English, philosophy, Swedish and drawing.

=== Education ===
She began studying architecture at the Royal Institute of Technology in 1919, after being admitted as a "special student" since women were not normally admitted to the school at that time. By this time, she had already been practicing architecture for several months at the firm of Folke Bensow and due to her skills began her schooling at the second year class level. She was the fourth woman ever to have been admitted, after Agnes Magnell, Anna Branzell and Signe Christensen. She graduated in 1922.

After graduation she travelled to study in Italy, Switzerland and Germany. She received a scholarship for this from Fredrika-Bremer-Förbundet. When she came back to Sweden she worked for several different architects, notably Folke Bensow (1923), Carl Bergsten (1924–1926), Evert Milles (1927) and Karl Güettler (1928). 1926–1928 she studied architecture at the Royal Institute of Art under professor Ragnar Östberg. She was the first woman to attend the course and received the highest grade. She was also the first woman licensed in architecture in Sweden.

=== Work ===
In 1929, she started her own architectural firm with another alumna from the Royal Institute of Technology, Kjerstin Göransson-Ljungman. The firm operated until 1936. The two architects were especially concerned with domestic working conditions for women, and were critical of the small kitchens displayed during the Stockholm Exhibition in 1930. Together they published a book on the subject in 1936. The partnership with Göransson-Ljungman ended in 1936, after which Wærn Bugge kept running the firm herself. For a while she engaged with questions of the design of domestic homes, and traveled in Sweden to study living conditions on farms.

She also taught on the countryside in courses arranged by Fredrika-Bremer-Förbundet and Svenska Slöjdföreningen. In addition, she wrote books and articles. In 1953, Bugge accepted employment at the Building Board in the cultural agency and focused on church restorations and other structures like the Chinese Pavilion at Drottningholm. She was a member of a number of societies and organisations, including Svenska Teknologföreningen, Svenska Arkitekters Riksförbund, and the women's association Nya Idun. She worked for the United Nations in Paris in 1953, and was a member of the municipal council for Nacka Municipality 1955–1969. She retired in 1974.

== Bibliography ==
- Lundahl, Gunilla, ed. (1992). Kvinnor som banade väg: porträtt av arkitekter (in Swedish). Stockholm: Statens råd för byggnadsforskning. ISBN 91-540-5413-3.
- Pred, Allan (25 February 2014). Recognising European Modernities: A Montage of the Present. New York, New York: Taylor & Francis. ISBN 978-1-317-83560-8.
- Werner, Helena (2006). Kvinnliga arkitekter: om byggpionjärer och debatterna kring kvinnlig yrkesutövning i Sverige (in Swedish). Göteborg: Acta Universitatis Gothoburgensis. ISBN 91-7346-571-2.
