= Jens Andreas Hjorth Bugge =

Norwegian ship-owner (1859–1939)

Jens Andreas Hjorth Bugge (20 June 1859 – 8 November 1939) was a Norwegian ship-owner.

== Personal life ==
He was born in Mandal as a son of ship-owner Jørgen Ørbech Bugge (1829–1888) and Guriane Olsen. He was a brother of priest Christian August Bugge, Supreme Court Justice Geirulf Bugge and civil servant Erling Bugge. Through them he was an uncle of barrister Heuch Bugge, art historian Anders Ragnar Bugge and tax director Karl Ludvig Bugge.

In 1906 he married editor's daughter Dagmar Nathalie Næss.

== Career ==
He attended school in Mandal, and worked in the same city as a merchant from 1886. From 1890 until his retirement in 1927 he was a ship-owner. He also became a municipal politician, was a board member of Mandals og Oplands Privatbank and supervisory council member of Mandals Sparebank, and was a consular agent for France. He was decorated as a Chevalier of the Légion d'honneur.

Bugge also published novels such as Kongen i Mandal (1910) and Fortuna (1913). He died in November 1939.
