= Claus Daae =

Norwegian priest, educator and politician

Claus Nils Holtzrod Daae (20 December 1806 – 13 November 1896) was a Norwegian priest, educator and politician.

== Personal life ==
He was born in Fana a son of dean Iver Munthe Daae (1771–1849) and Edvardine Fritzner. His father was mayor of Fana from 1838 to 1839. He was a first cousin of historian and politician Ludvig Kristensen Daa, and an uncle of physician Anders Daae. He was a first cousin once removed of jurist and politician Ludvig Daae, historian and politician Ludvig Daae, customs inspector Iver Munthe Daae, prison director Anders Daae and Suzannah Daae Ibsen.

In November 1835 in Bergen he married Aadel Christine Wibye (1813–1896). She was a first cousin on his maternal side.

== Career ==
Daae finished his secondary education at Bergen Cathedral School in 1825, and took the cand.theol. degree already in 1828. He continued to study, and worked on a thesis to become a licentiate; however, he never came to defend his thesis. He was instead appointed as vicar for Stord Church in 1834. In 1838 he was hired as teacher and manager at Stord Teacher's Seminary, a position he held until 1860. Daae was elected to the Parliament of Norway from the constituency Søndre Bergenhus Amt in 1848, and served one term.

From 1861 to 1865 he was a vicar in Trondhjem. He was elected as a fellow of the Royal Norwegian Society of Sciences and Letters in 1861. From 1865 to 1867 he served as the dean in Bergen Cathedral. He died in November 1896 in Bergen.
