= Jens Bloch =

Danish theologian (1761–1830)

Right Reverend Doctor Jens Bloch
- Bishop
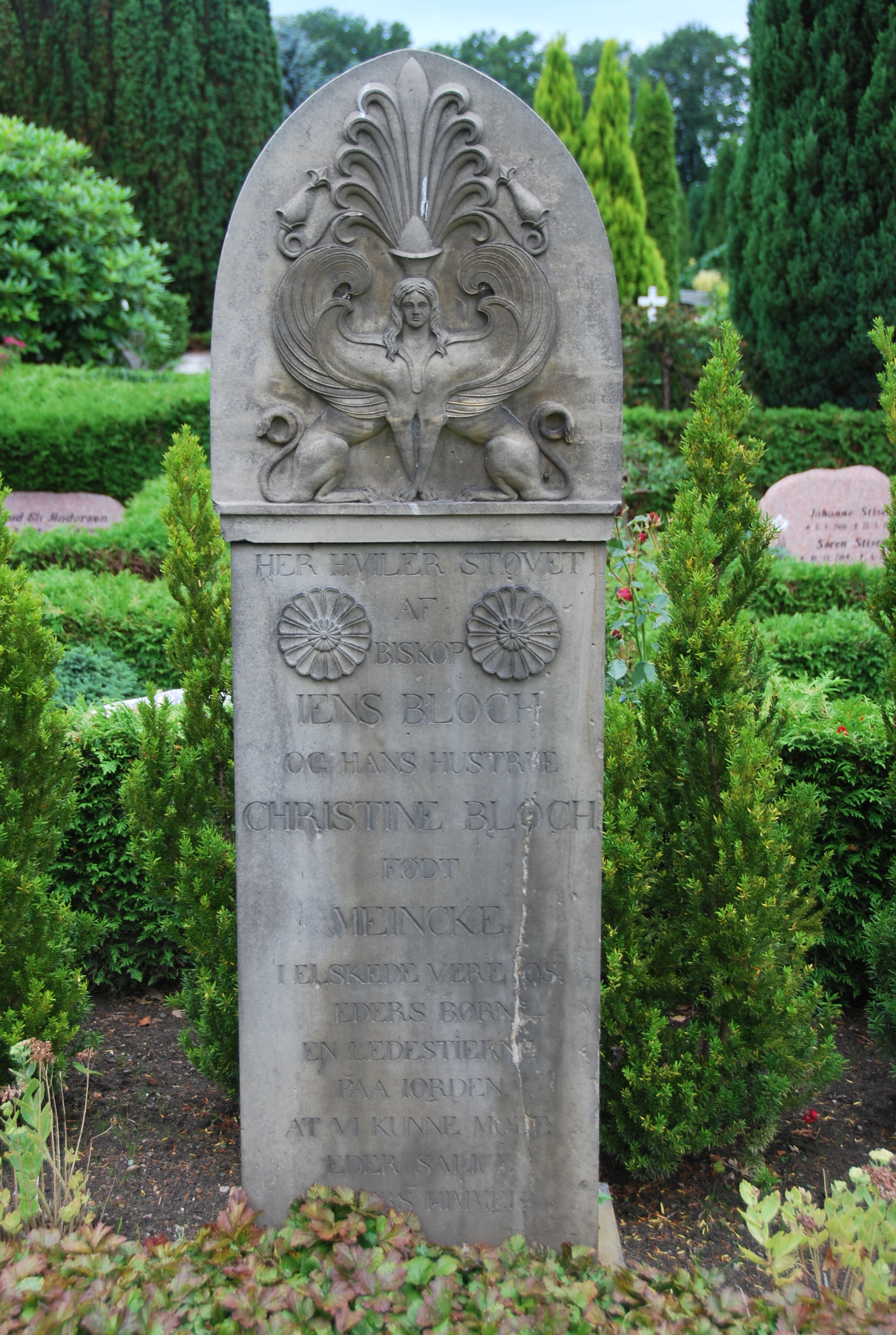
- Gravestone of Jens Bloch (Photo: Lars Schmidt)
- Church: Church of Norway and Church of Denmark
- Diocese: Christianssand and Viborg
- Appointed: 1804
- In office: 1804–1830

Personal details
- Born: 27 June 1761 Hals, Denmark
- Died: 4 July 1830 (aged 69) Viborg, Denmark
- Denomination: Christian
- Occupation: Priest
- Education: University of Copenhagen (Dr.Theol.)

Jens Bloch (27 June 1761–4 July 1830) was a Danish theologian and priest. He was a bishop in both Norway (briefly) and Denmark from 1804 until his death in 1830.

== Personal life ==
Jens Bloch was born on 27 June 1761 in Hals in Denmark to Rasmus Bloch and Anne Christine Lassen Banner. When he was 12, his father sent him to be trained at the trade office in Riga, Latvia, however he soon decided not to pursue that career, so he returned to Denmark. He married Christine Meincke in 1798. Together, they had 1 son and 4 daughters.

== Education and career ==
Jens Bloch graduated from the Aalborg Latin School in 1780. He got a degree in theology in 1784. He then did some traveling through Europe, spending 2 years studying in Göttingen. The time in Göttingen led to being awarded a master's degree in Philology by the University of Copenhagen. He was given a job as a lecturer at the same university after that. In 1790, he finished his dissertation on his doctorate in philosophy degree.

In 1790, he got the job as a priest in Stigs Bjergby in Holbæk Municipality in Denmark. In 1795, he was transferred to the Church of Holmen in Copenhagen, first starting as the assistant chaplain and working his way up to the parish priest by 1797. Also in 1795, he received a doctor of theology degree from the University of Kiel. The same year, he became a member of the Royal Norwegian Society of Sciences and Letters. In 1804, he was appointed to be the Bishop of the Diocese of Christianssand, based in Christianssand, Norway. This position did not last long, because in less than one year, he was transferred to the Diocese of Viborg in Denmark, a position he held until his death in 1830. In 1810, he was made a Knight of the Order of the Dannebrog, and in 1817, he was elevated to Commander of the same order.

Church of Norway titles
| Preceded by Peder Hansen | Bishop of Christianssand; 1804–1805 | Succeeded by Johan Michael Keyser |
| Preceded by Peder Tetens | Bishop of Viborg; 1805–1830 | Succeeded by Nicolaj Esmark Øllgaard |
