= John Collett Postumus Elieson =

Norwegian jurist and politician (1810–1876)

John Collett Postumus Elieson (21 February 1810 – 27 May 1876) was a Norwegian jurist and politician.

Elieson was born at Rygge in Østfold, Norway. He worked as an attorney and later district stipendiary magistrate in Drammen. He was elected to the Norwegian Parliament in 1845, 1848, 1854, 1857 and 1859, representing the constituency of Drammen.

He was married to Ingeborg Eivindsdatter Aarhusmoen (1817–1902). His daughter Kirsten Anna Janette Elieson (1839–1913) married Johan Christian Heuch, bishop and member of the Heuch merchant family in Kragerø.
