= Hans Daae =

Norwegian physician and military officer (1865–1926)

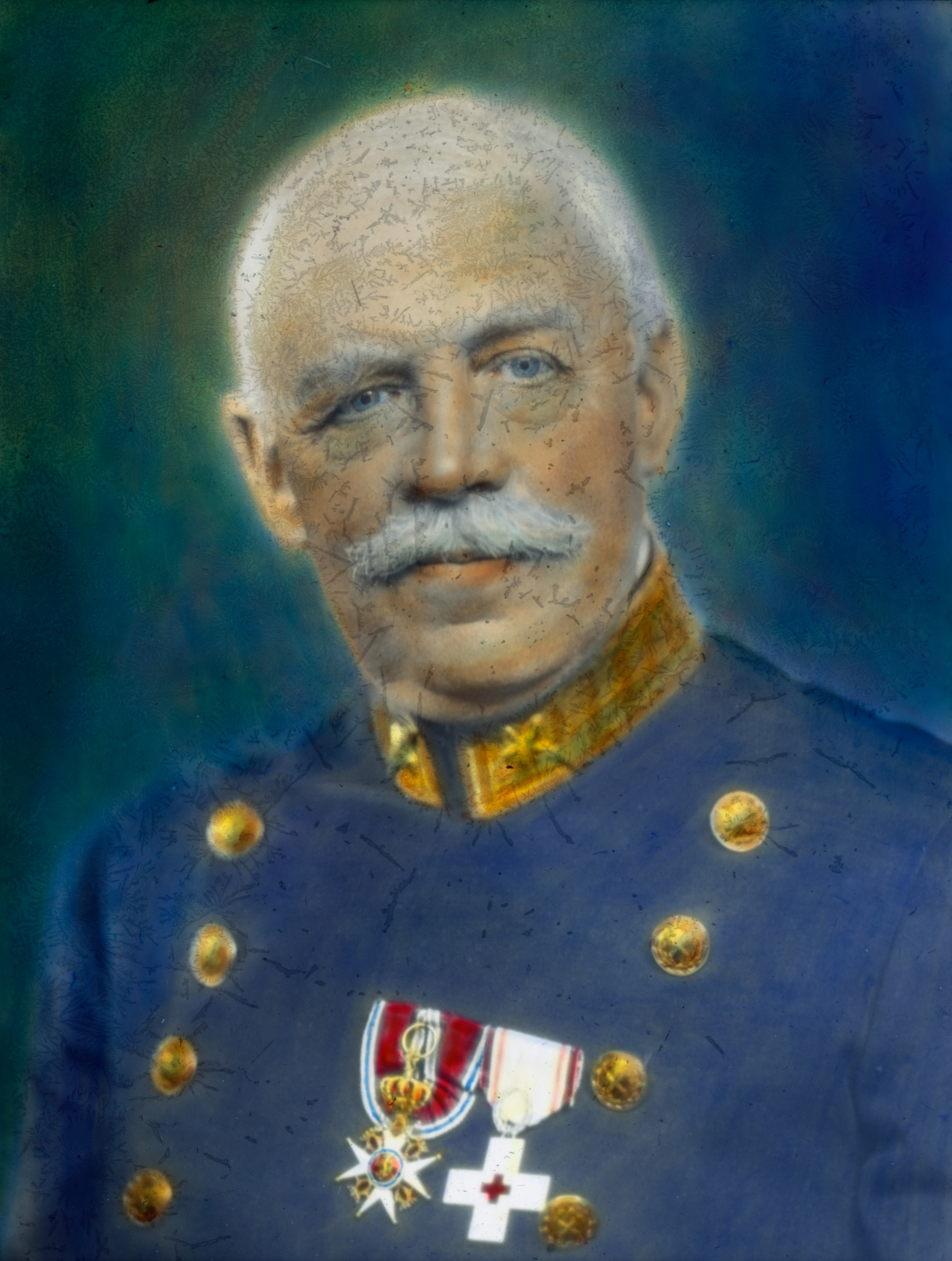
- Born: 15 October 1865; Kragerø, Norway
- Died: 10 December 1926 (aged 61); Oslo
- Occupations: Physician; Military officer Sports official
- Parent: Anders Daae
- Awards: Order of St. Olav; Order of the Dannebrog; Order of the Polar Star

Hans Daae (15 October 1865 – 10 December 1926) was a Norwegian physician, military officer and sports official.

== Personal life ==
Daae was born in Kragerø to prison director Anders Daae and Anna Honoria Hansen. He married Anna Helen Alm in 1894.

== Career ==
He graduated as cand.med. in 1890, and was also a military officer. He headed the Norwegian Army's medical service from 1909, and was promoted major general in 1917. He initiated and edited the magazine Norsk Tidsskrift for Militærmedicin. From 1916 to 1920 he chaired the sports association Centralforeningen for utbredelse af idræt. He was decorated Knight, First Class of the Order of St. Olav in 1911, and was a Commander of the Order of the Dannebrog. He died in Oslo in 1926.

Sporting positions
Preceded by Oscar Sigvald Julius Strugstad	Chairman of Centralforeningen; 1916–1919	Succeeded by Hjalmar Krag (Norges Landsforbund for Idræt)
