= Anders Daae (physician) =

Norwegian-American physician

Anders Daae (27 September 1852 – 14 June 1924) was a Norwegian-American physician.

== Personal life ==
He was born at Fjeld Municipality in Søndre Bergenhus county, Norway. He was a son of vicar Jens Kobro Daae (1811–1897) and his wife Nicoline Friis Daae (1820–1895). His mother was his father's first cousin, as well as a sister of historian and politician Ludvig Kristensen Daa. Anders Daae was also a nephew of priest and politician Claus Nils Holtzrod Daae, and a second cousin of Norwegian customs director Iver Munthe Daae (1845–1924), prison director Anders Daae, jurist and politician Ludvig Daae, historian Ludvig Daae and Suzannah Daae Ibsen. Anders Daae's sister Dina married bishop Wilhelm Bugge, and as such Daae was an uncle of Fredrik Moltke Bugge.

In May 1890 in Chicago he married Ragnhild Blegen.

== Career ==
Daae finished his secondary education in Skien in 1869, and took the cand.med. degree in 1878. He was a board member of the Norwegian Students' Society, and in 1876 and 1878 he chaired the students' society Medicinerforeningen. He worked at Rikshospitalet from 1878 to 1879, Gaustad Asylum from 1879 to 1880 and at Eidsvold Bad in 1880. From 1880 to 1884 and 1885 to his death he worked in Chicago, Illinois. He was a member of the Chicago Medical Society and the Scandinavian Medical Society in Chicago. In addition to being a physician, he worked as a correspondent for Aftenposten. He headed several fundraisers when disasters, such as the Ålesund Fire, occurred in Norway or Sweden. In 1906 he also headed the Norwegian-American deputation to the coronation of King Haakon VII and Queen Maud of Norway.

He was decorated as a Knight of the Order of St. Olav in October 1906. He died in June 1924 in Chicago of diabetes mellitus.
