= Anders Daae (prison director) =

Norwegian prison director

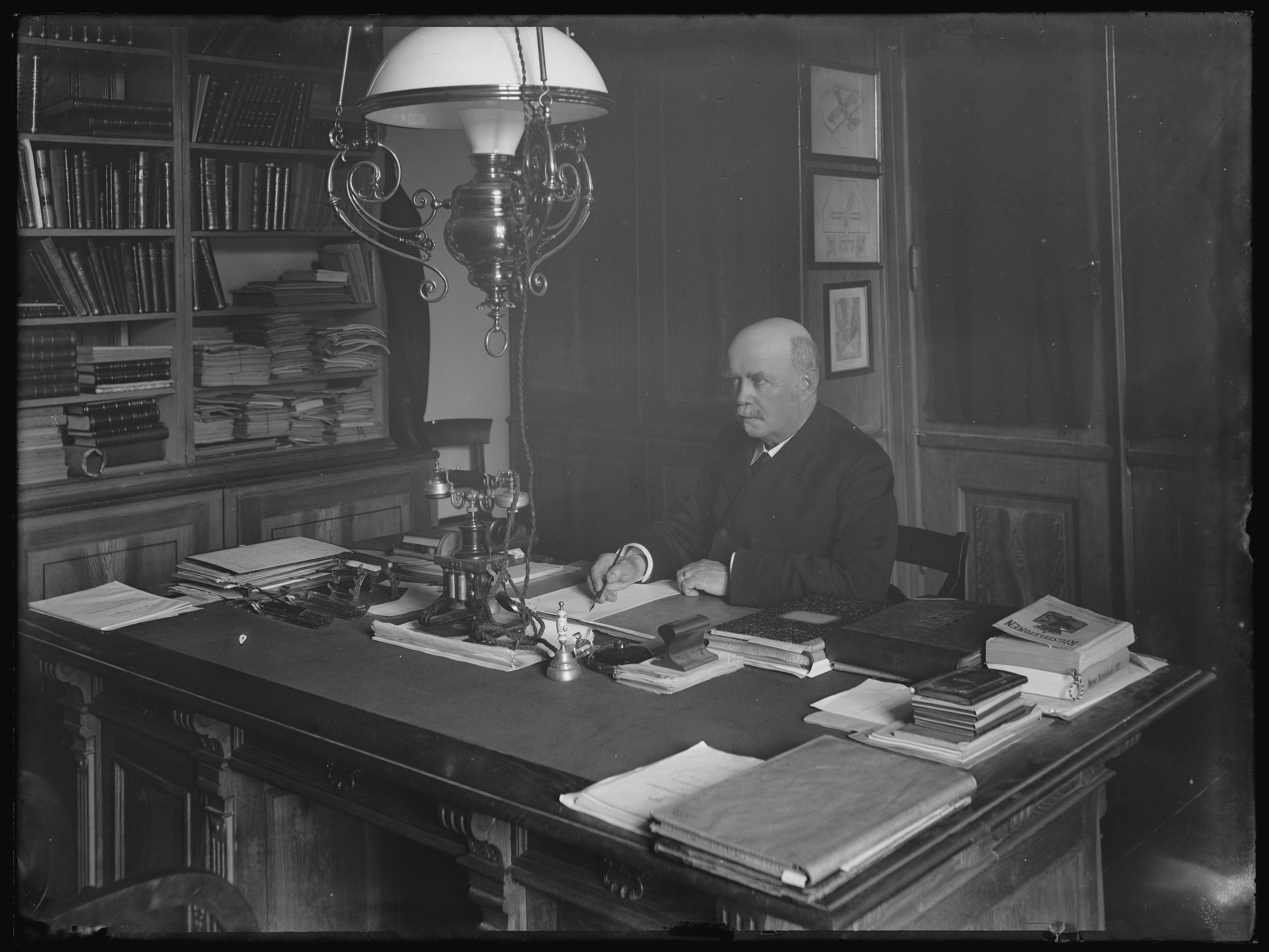
- Born: 21 April 1838; Bergen, Norway
- Died: 19 December 1910 (aged 72); Kristiania

Anders Daae (21 April 1838 – 19 December 1910) was a Norwegian prison director.

== Personal life ==
He was born in Bergen a son of vicar Hans Daae and his wife Anne Johanne Christie. He was a brother of customs inspector Iver Munthe Daae. He was also a first cousin once removed of priest and politician Claus Nils Holtzrod Daae and historian and politician Ludvig Kristensen Daa, and a second cousin of jurist and politician Ludvig Daae, physician Anders Daae, historian Ludvig Daae and Suzannah Daae Ibsen.

In July 1863 in Chicago, USA he married Anne Honoria Hanssen. They had the son Hans Daae, a general in the medical corps.

== Career ==
Daae finished his secondary education at Nissen School in Christiania in 1855, and took the cand.med. degree in 1861. He worked as a physician in various places, among others in the American Civil War. From 1864 to 1887 he ran a physician's office in Kragerø. From 1887 to 1892 he was the director of Trondhjems Strafanstalt, a jail in Trondhjem, and from 1892 he was the director of Bodsfængslet, a notable prison in Kristiania. He died in December 1910 in Kristiania.
