= Theory on immigration to Norway =

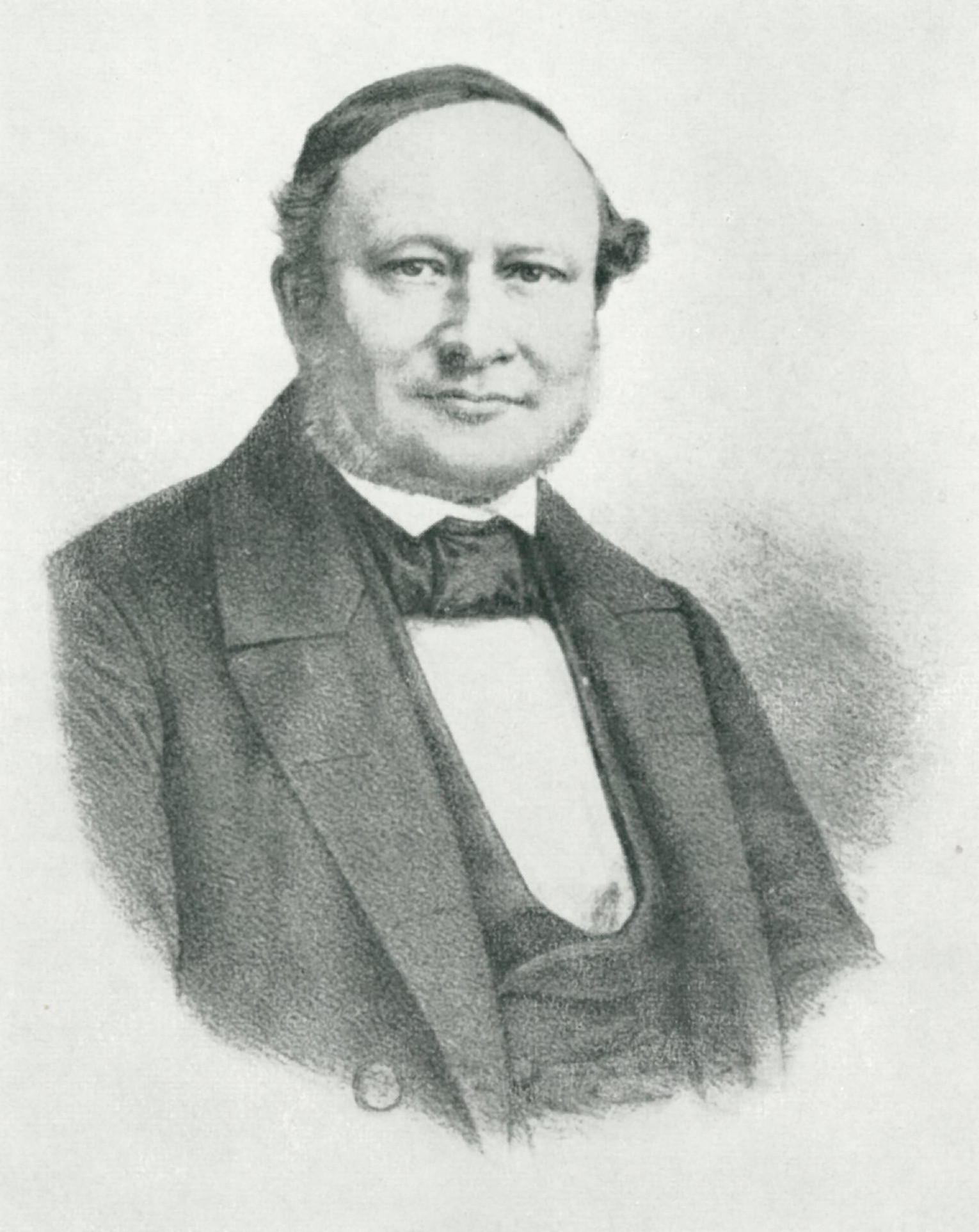
Rudolf Keyser.

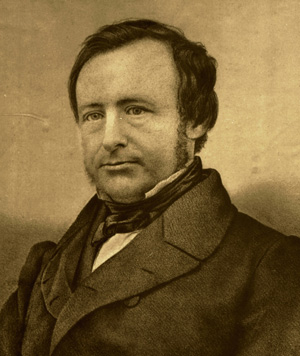
Peter Andreas Munch.

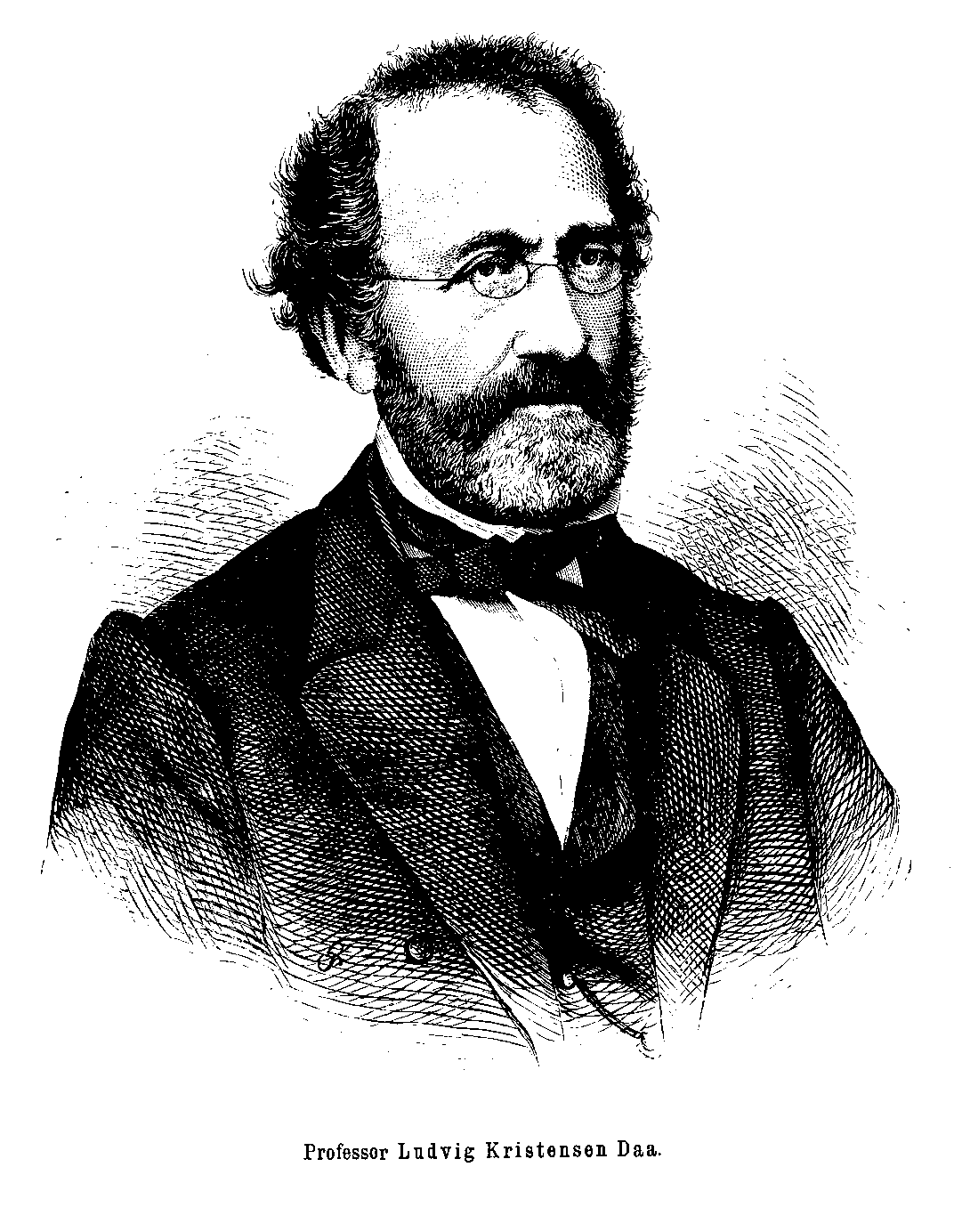
Ludvig Kristensen Daa.

The theory on immigration to Norway (Norwegian: innvandringsteorien) refers to an outdated theory on the origin of the Norwegian people. The theory is mainly associated with Rudolf Keyser, and developed by Peter Andreas Munch. The theory posited that Norway and northern Sweden had been populated by indigenous Norse people from the north, whereas Denmark and southern Sweden had been populated by Gothic peoples from the south. The theory was generally rejected by historians.

== Theory ==
Following studies in Iceland from 1825 to 1827, Rudolf Keyser was appointed as a docent at the Royal Frederick University in Christiania, Norway in 1828. From the same year he worked with, and held lectures on, his theory on immigration to Norway. This theory was inspired by the works of Gerhard Schøning, who had released Afhandling om de Norskes og endeel andre Nordiske Folkes Oprindelse in 1769, and was first published in 1839 under the name Om Nordmændenes Herkomst og Folke-Slægtskab. In short, his theory stated that Norway as well as northern Sweden had been populated by indigenous people from the north, whereas Denmark and southern Sweden (south of Götaland) had been populated from the south. In other words, Norway was especially influenced by "Norse" people and culture, whereas parts of Sweden and particularly Denmark were influenced by "Gothic" peoples and culture. Norse people had, according to Keyser, drifted south towards Denmark as well, but here they had been mixed with Goths. He later supplemented the theory with a series of lectures in literary studies, printed posthumously, under the name Nordmændenes Videnskabelighed og Literatur i Middelalderen. Here, he stated that Norse literature was not Nordic but Norwegian. Both the Norse and Gothic groups were taken to be Germanic peoples, having migrated from somewhere in the region of Ural and the Volga River.

Peter Andreas Munch was a student of Keyser, and fellow proponent of the theory. He remarked that Gothic people inhabited some of South Norway as well. He too based the theory partly on linguistic traits, and also stated that the two groups had different approaches to liberty versus hierarchy.

== Reaction ==
The theory was ill-received by many historians, especially those who did not subscribe to any form of Norwegian nationalistic agenda. The Danish historian Christian Molbech dubbed Keyser and Munch's viewpoint as "The Norwegian Historical School".

The theory was also denounced by Norwegian historians. A lecture held by Ludvig Kristensen Daa on a Scandinavian conference in 1868 has been called "the graveside speech for the immigration theory". He released the work Have Germanerne indvandret til Skandinavien fra nord eller syd? in 1869.
