= Rudolf Keyser =

Norwegian historian, archaeologist and educator (1803–1864)

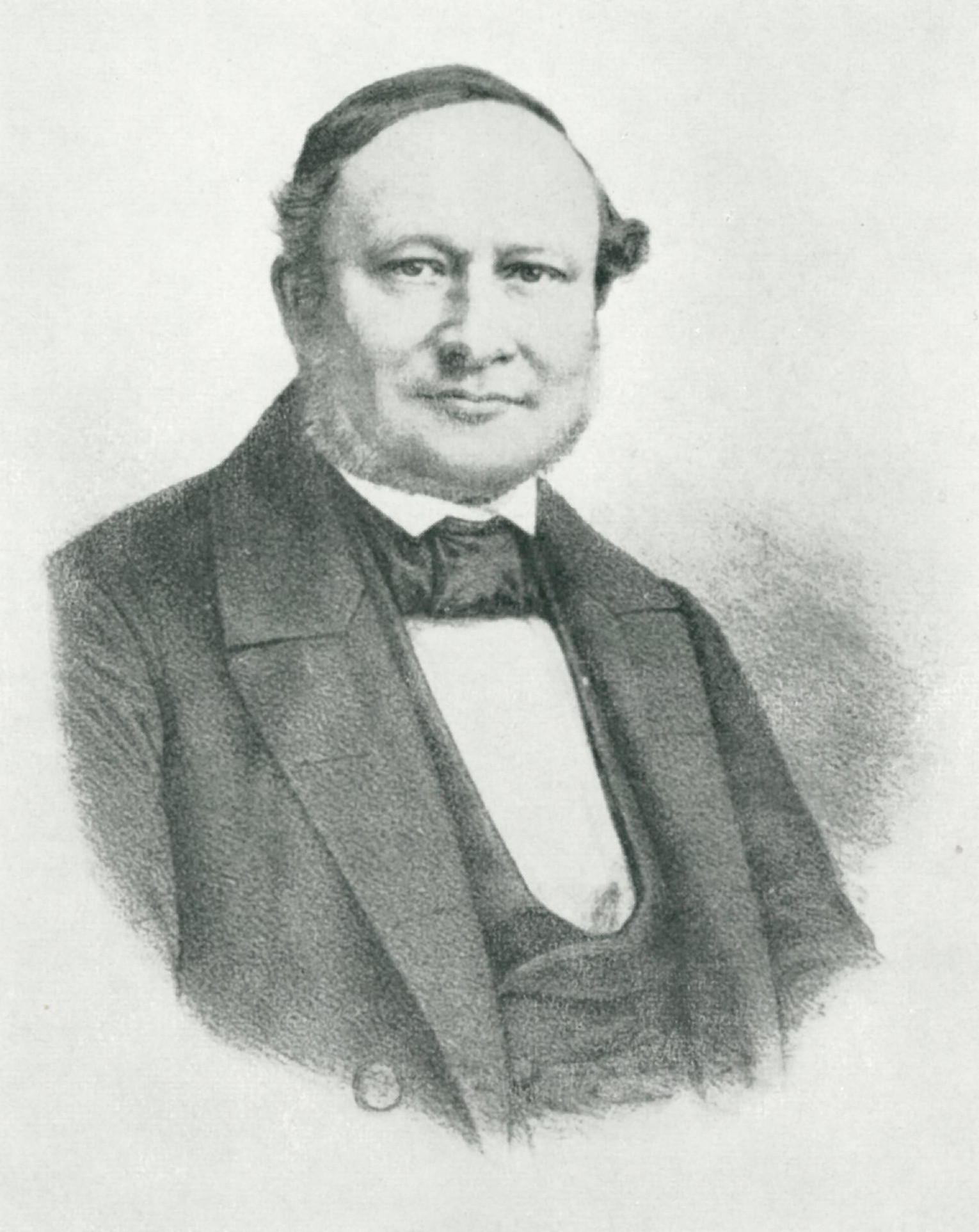
- Born: Jakob Rudolf Keyser; 1 January 1803; Christiania, now Oslo, Norway
- Died: 9 October 1864 (aged 61)
- Occupation(s): Historian, archaeologist and educator

Jakob Rudolf Keyser (1 January 1803 – 9 October 1864) was a Norwegian historian, archaeologist and educator.

== Biography ==
Jakob Rudolf Keyser was born in Christiania, now Oslo, Norway. He was the son of Bishop Johan Michael Keyser (1749–1810) and his second wife Kirsten Margarethe Wangensteen. He was the brother of professor Fredrik Wilhelm Keyser and theologian Christian Nicolai Keyser.

Following studies in Iceland, Rudolf Keyser was appointed as a docent at the Royal Frederick University in Christiania in 1828. He became a professor in 1831 and remained at the university until he retired in 1862. Keyser was also the first manager for the University Museum of National Antiquities. He cataloged and categorized prehistoric artifacts which had originated from excavations. He did so utilizing the chronological system developed by Christian Jürgensen Thomsen.

Keyser was most commonly associated with the Theory on immigration to Norway. Keyser was a supporter of the migration theory that the Norse tribes had wandered into Norway from the north and east, a view also shared by Peter Andreas Munch, a former student of Keyser. This theory was inspired in part by the earlier works of Gerhard Schøning. The theory was commonly denounced by many Norwegian historians especially by Ludvig Kristensen Daa. Rudolf Keyser became a knight in the Order of St. Olav in 1847.

== Selected works ==
- Nordmændenes religionsforfatning i hedendommen (1847)
- Den norske Kirkes Historie under Katholicismen, volume 1 (1856)
- Den norske Kirkes Historie under Katholicismen, volume 2 (1858)
- Norges Historie, volume 1 (1866)
- Norges Historie, volume 2 (1870) and
- Samlede Afhandlinger (1868)

== Other sources ==
- Stugu, Ola Svein (2008) Historie i bruk (Oslo: Samlaget) ISBN 978-82-521-7214-0
- Andersen, Per Sveaas (1960) Rudolf Keyser Embetsmann og Historiker (Oslo: Universitetsforlaget)
