= Per Berg Lund =

Norwegian politician and jurist (1878–1954)

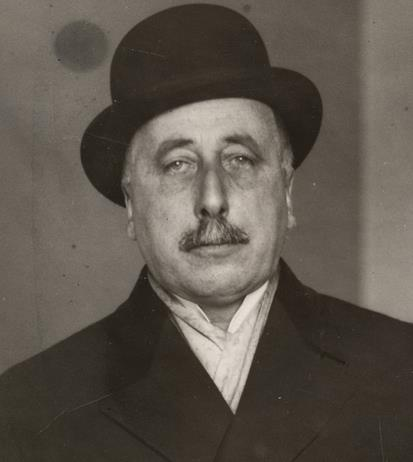

Director of the Norwegian Tax Administration
- In office 1934–1948
- Preceded by: Position established
- Succeeded by: Karl Ludvig Bugge

Minister of Finance
- In office 3 March 1933 – 3 November 1934
- Prime Minister: J. L. Mowinckel
- Preceded by: Jon Sundby
- Succeeded by: Gunnar Jahn
- In office 15 February 1928 – 12 May 1931
- Prime Minister: J. L. Mowinckel
- Preceded by: Christopher Hornsrud
- Succeeded by: Peder Kolstad

Personal details
- Born: 14 October 1878 Kristiania, Sweden-Norway
- Died: 22 January 1954 (aged 75) Oslo, Norway
- Party: Liberal

Per Berg Lund (14 October 1878 – 22 January 1954) was a Norwegian politician and jurist for the Liberal Party who served Minister of Finance from 1928 to 1931 and again from 1933 to 1934. He also served as the director of the Norwegian Tax Administration from 1934 to 1948.

Political offices
Preceded by Christopher Hornsrud	Norwegian Minister of Finance; 1928–1931	Succeeded by Peder Kolstad
Preceded by Jon Sundby	Norwegian Minister of Finance; 1933–1934	Succeeded by Gunnar Jahn
Government offices
Preceded by	Director of the Norwegian Tax Administration; 1934–1948	Succeeded by Karl Ludvig Bugge
