= Johannes Christian Piene =

Norwegian businessman and politician

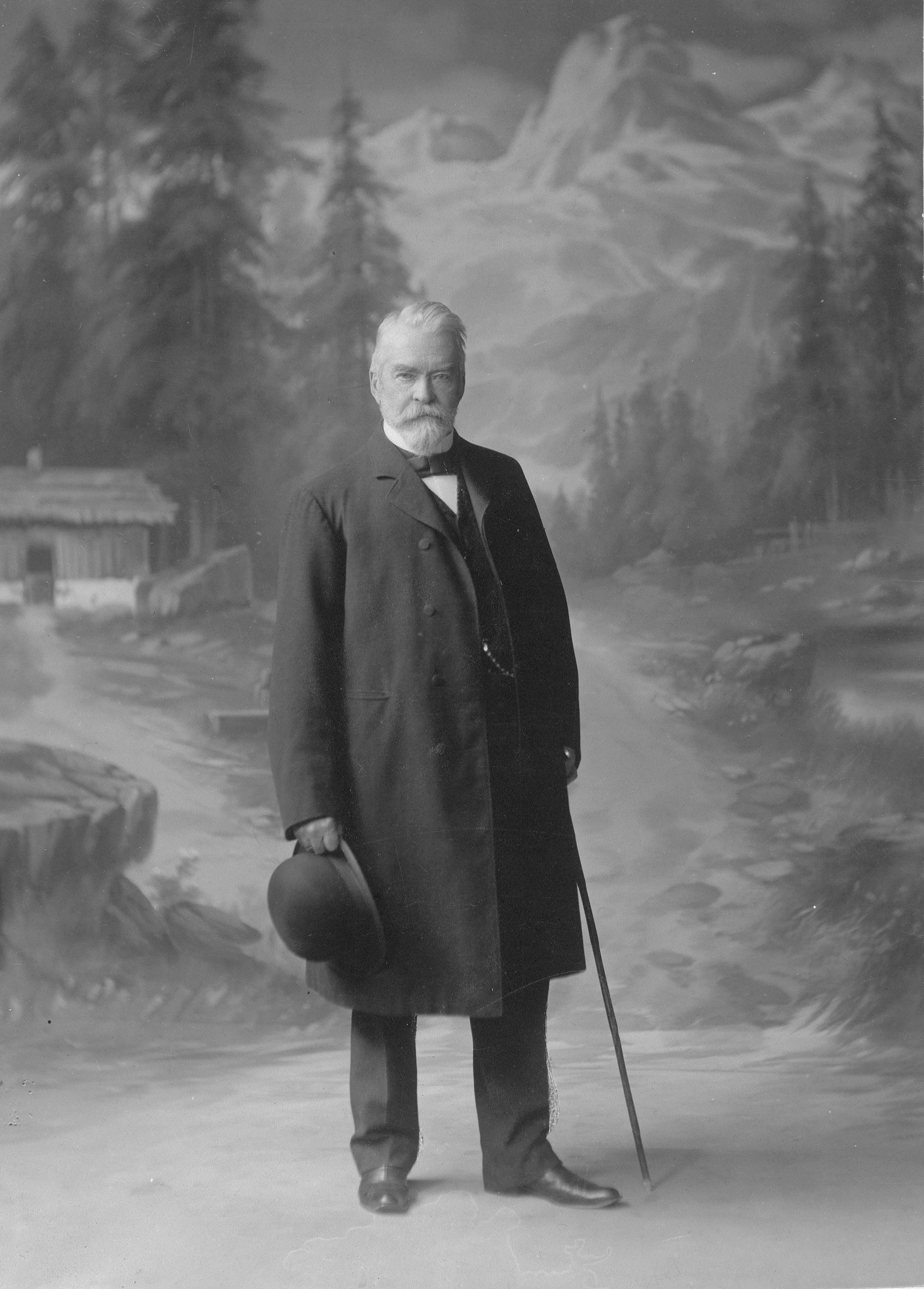
Johannes Christian Piene

Johannes Christian Piene (19 August 1832 – 2 July 1912) was a Norwegian businessman and Conservative Party politician.

Piene was born in Trondhjem - the son of merchant and industrialist Caspar Christian Piene (1805–1885) and Lucie Benedicte Bugge (1794–1873). He was also the maternal grandson of bishop Peter Olivarius Bugge, nephew of educator Frederik Moltke Bugge and a first cousin of bishop Wilhelm Bugge. In 1859 he married Henriette Jacobine Aubert (1838–1912).

He became a co-owner of his father's company (established 1853), and established his own company I. C. Piene & Søn in 1866. He acquired burghership in Trondhjem in 1867. The company was centered on the mill which he bought in Ila. In 1878 he established the mill Hammerstrand Mølle in Buvika. The mill at Ila burned down in 1888, was rebuilt, but in 1897 Piene relocated fully to Buvika. His company became a leading producer of flour in its region, and existed until 1991.

Piene was also a board chairman of Trondhjems Mekaniske Verksted and Ranheim Cellulosefabrik, and was a board member of local banks. He represented the Conservative Party in the city council, and also in the Parliament of Norway for the constituency Trondhjem og Levanger from 1892 to 1894. He was decorated with the Royal Norwegian Order of St. Olav in 1891, and died in July 1912 in Helsingborg.
