= Harald Arnkværn =

Norwegian barrister and businessperson

Harald Arnkværn (born 5 February 1939) is a Norwegian barrister and businessperson.

He was born in Oslo. He finished his secondary education in 1957 and took the cand.jur. degree in 1964. He was a deputy judge in Ringerike District Court from 1964 to 1965, then a junior solicitor from 1965 to 1972 with a study leave at the University of Illinois Law School from 1967 to 1968. He took the lawyer's license in 1966 and was a barrister (a lawyer with access to Supreme Court cases) from 1972.

He was employed in Christiania Spigerverk from 1965 to 1974 and Den norske Creditbank from 1974 to 1988. In 1988 he was acting chief executive officer of DnC. He then continued his career as a barrister in the law firm Haavind Vislie.

He succeeded Knut Rasmussen as chair of the supervisory council in UNI Storebrand in 1992. He has also been chair of Christiania Bank og Kreditkasse from 1996 to 2001, Kværner, Vinmonopolet, Schøyen Gruppen, the Norwegian Guarantee Institute for Export Credits, Fjellinjen, A. Falkenberg Eftf. and Afas. He became corporate council leader in the Orkla Group in 2001.

Business positions
Preceded by Leif Terje Løddesøl	Chief executive officer of Den norske Creditbank; 1988 (acting)	Succeeded by Kristian Rambjør
Preceded by Kjeld Rimberg	Chair of Vinmonopolet; 1996–2005	Succeeded by Siri Hatlen
