= Geirulf Bugge =

Norwegian judge

Geirulf Bugge (1 February 1862 – 3 November 1940) was a Norwegian judge.

== Personal life ==
He was born in Mandal as a son of ship-owner Jørgen Ørbech Bugge (1829–1888) and Amalia Gjerulfsen. He was a brother of priest Christian August Bugge, ship-owner Jens Andreas Hjorth Bugge and civil servant Erling Bugge, and an uncle of barrister Heuch Bugge, art historian Anders Ragnar Bugge and civil servant Karl Ludvig Bugge.

In 1892 he married Josefine Othilie Johnsen from Halden.

== Career ==
He finished his secondary education in 1880, and graduated from the Royal Frederick University with the cand.jur. degree in 1885. He became a barrister in 1889, with access to working with Supreme Court cases. He worked as an attorney in Fredrikstad from 1889 to 1918, when he became an assessor. In 1919 he was promoted to Supreme Court Justice.

While in Fredrikstad he was also elected to the city council and its executive committee. He was also a board member of the Norwegian Bar Association from 1908 to 1916. He died in November 1940.
