= Peter Andreas Heuch =

Norwegian merchant (1756–1825)

Peter Andreas Heuch (18 April 1756 – 5 December 1825) was a Norwegian merchant.

Heuch was a ship-owner based in the coastal town of Kragerø in Telemark county, Norway. He was among the wealthiest persons in Southern Norway. He also helped found the Royal Frederick University (now University of Oslo) in 1811.

He was the father of merchant and politician Johan Christian Heuch, Sr. and thus a grandfather of bishop and politician Johan Christian Heuch.
