= Leif Terje Løddesøl =

Norwegian businessperson (1935–2021)

Leif Terje Løddesøl (24 April 1935 – 18 November 2021) was a Norwegian businessperson.

He was born in Oslo as a son of Aasulv Løddesøl (1896–1978) and Liv Marie Bjørlykke (1905–1994). He has been married twice. He graduated from the University of Oslo with the cand.jur. degree in 1960, and studied further, among others at The Hague Academy of International Law and the College of Europe in Brussels. After a period as deputy judge in Hardanger District Court he worked in the Ministry of Foreign Affairs from 1963 to 1966 and the Norwegian Shipowners' Association from 1966 to 1969.

He was then the chief executive officer of ScanAustral from 1969 to 1973, Wilh. Wilhelmsen from 1973 to 1980 and Den norske Creditbank from 1980 to 1988. The bank became embroiled in hardships during a banking crisis (see among others the Black Monday 1987), and an employee also defrauded the bank. Løddesøl was removed as chief executive in 1988, but returned to the corporate executive team in Wilh. Wilhelmsen, where he stayed until 2000. From 2000 to 2002 he was the president of the Norwegian Shipowners' Association.

He was a board member of Den norske Creditbank in the 1970s and chaired the Norwegian Bankers' Association from 1982 to 1984. He chaired the Norwegian National Opera from 1996 to 2005 and Wilh. Wilhelmsen from 2000 to 2003. He chaired the corporate council of Statoil from 1996, and later the board from 2002 to 2003. He had to leave after the Iran case.

He was decorated as a Knight, First Class of the Order of St. Olav in 1985.

Business positions
Preceded by	Chief executive officer of Wilh. Wilhelmsen; 1973–1980	Succeeded by
Preceded by Johan Melander	Chief executive officer of Den norske Creditbank; 1980–1988	Succeeded by Harald Arnkværn (acting)
Preceded by Bjørn Sjaastad	President of the Norwegian Shipowners' Association; 2000–2002	Succeeded by Terje J. K. Andersen
Preceded by Ole Lund	Chair of Statoil; 2002–2003	Succeeded by Jannik Lindbæk
Preceded by	Chair of Wilh. Wilhelmsen; 2000–2003	Succeeded by
