= Ludvig Kristensen Daa =

Norwegian historian and politician (1809–1877)

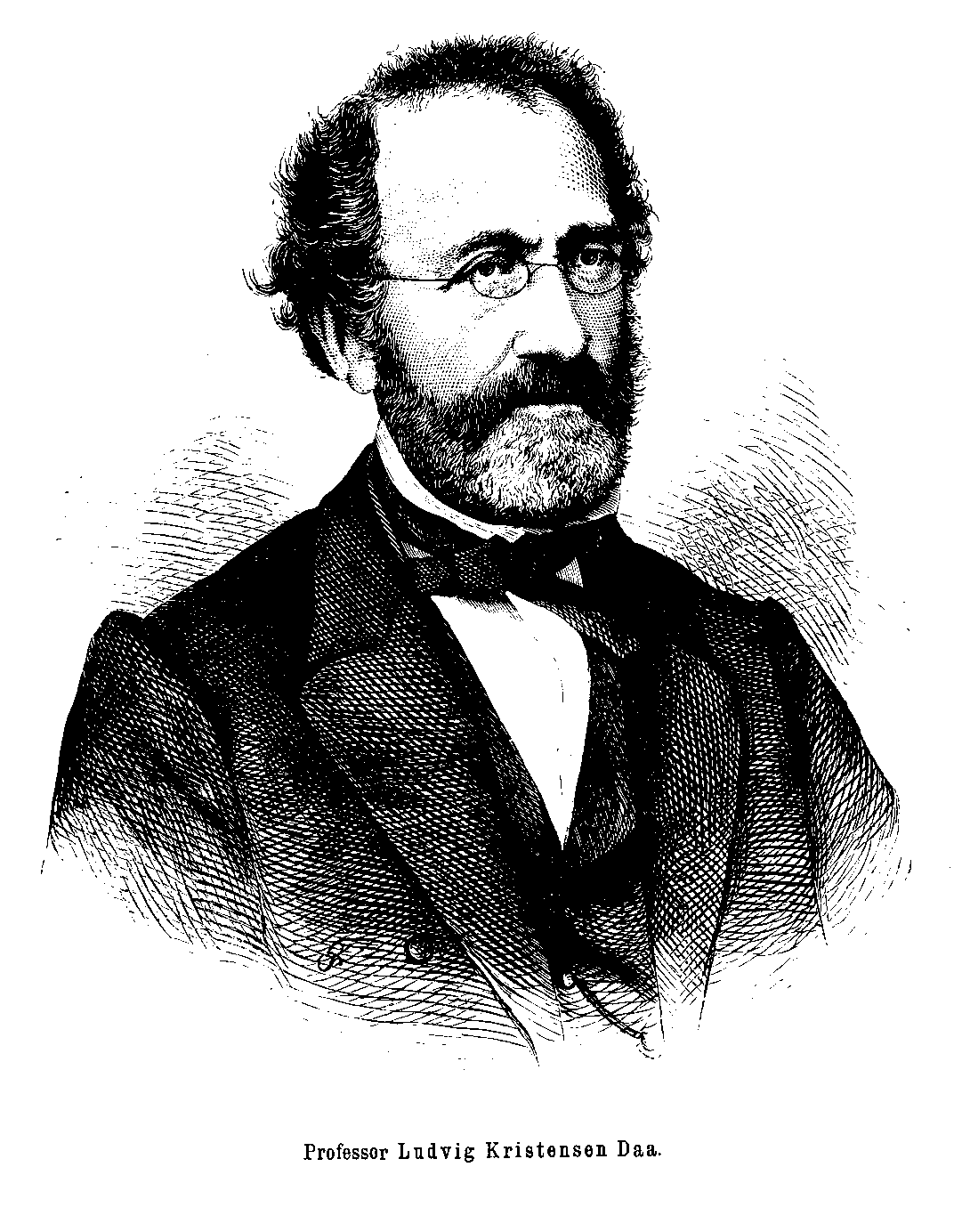
Ludvig Kristensen Daa.

Ludvig Kristensen Daa (19 August 1809 – 12 June 1877) was a Norwegian historian, ethnologist, auditor, editor of magazines and newspapers, educator and politician.

== Background ==
He was born as Ludvig Christensen Daae in Saltdal to vicar Christen Daae (1776–1854) and Elisabeth Marie Friis (1785–1865). The family moved to Jølster in 1817. At the age of thirteen, Daa started at the Bergen Cathedral School and took the examen artium later as a private candidate. After a period as a private teacher in Christian Krohg's family in 1828 he enrolled at the Royal Frederick University. Here he was a leader in the Norwegian Students' Society, and sided with Henrik Wergeland in the dispute with Johan Sebastian Welhaven. The group of which Daae was a part celebrated the Norwegian Constitution Day in 1829, a notable event. In 1830 he Norwegianized his name from Daae to Daa. He graduated with the cand.philol. degree in 1834, was hired as a substitute docent for Steenbloch in 1836 and 1837, due to Steenbloch's illness and subsequent death. In 1837 Daa could have been appointed as the new professor, but Welhaven associate Peter Andreas Munch was chosen. In 1840 Anton Martin Schweigaard got another post that Daa wanted, as professor of economics and statistics.

== Career ==
Daa held multiple jobs; he worked as a state auditor from 1839 to 1851, parliamentary archivist from 1841, columnist in Morgenbladet from 1839 to 1847 and Christiania-Posten from 1848 to 1851, and publisher of the magazine Granskeren from 1840 to 1843. In 1840–1841 he ran afoul with Henrik Wergeland, who wrote the farces Engelsk Salt and Vinægers Fjeldeventyr (both 1841) about Daa. Daa replied with anonymous attacks in Granskeren, whereas Wergeland was convicted of libel. In 1842 Wergeland released the poem Fordums-Venner about Daa. Daa and Wergeland later reconciled.

Daa was elected to the Parliament of Norway from the constituency Akershus Amt in 1842 and 1845. He became an important oppositional politician, and among others helped repel the ban on conventicles in 1842. He was also a proponent of ministerial responsibility, the access of ministers to Parliament and the access of Jews to Norway. In his second term he became President of the Odelsting. However, he ran afoul with the socially conservative farmer representatives. He was re-elected in 1848 from the constituency Søndre Bergenhus Amt (now Hordaland), but he was later found to be non-eligible for election from that constituency. While waiting for the next election, he issued the periodical Den norske Tilskuer, and also worked at Christiania Cathedral School. From 1853 to 1856 he was the editor of Christiania-Posten, and in 1853 he was elected to Parliament for the last time, from Christiania. He was not re-elected again, despite trying in every election until 1873.

The rector of Christiania Cathedral School wanted to have Daa removed, and in 1862 he was appointed as lecturer at the University. He was promoted to professor in 1866, and had been the director of the Ethnographic Museum since 1863. As a professor, in 1868 he managed to denounce Peter Andreas Munch and Rudolf Keyser's theory on immigration to Norway. He was a member of the Norwegian Academy of Science and Letters, the Royal Norwegian Society of Sciences and Letters and the Royal Society of Sciences and Letters in Gothenburg, and received the honorary degree at Lund University in 1868. He was decorated with the Order of St. Olav in 1866. His works soon became passé, though, as Ernst Sars became the dominating historian in Norway, to quite a degree for political reasons.

== Personal life ==
Daa lost his wife Julie Christence Augusta Henriksen (1823–1842) in August 1842; they had only been married since November 1840.

Daae was married for the second time, in August 1848 to Pernille Kobroe Daae (1821–1911). He was also a first cousin of priest and politician Claus Nils Holtzrod Daae, and a first cousin once removed of jurist and politician Ludvig Daae, historian and politician Ludvig Ludvigsen Daae, customs inspector Iver Munthe Daae and Suzannah Daae Ibsen. He died in June 1877 in Kristiania.
