= Wilhelm Bugge =

19th-century Norwegian politician, bishop, and theologian

Frederik Wilhelm Bugge
- Bishop of Oslo
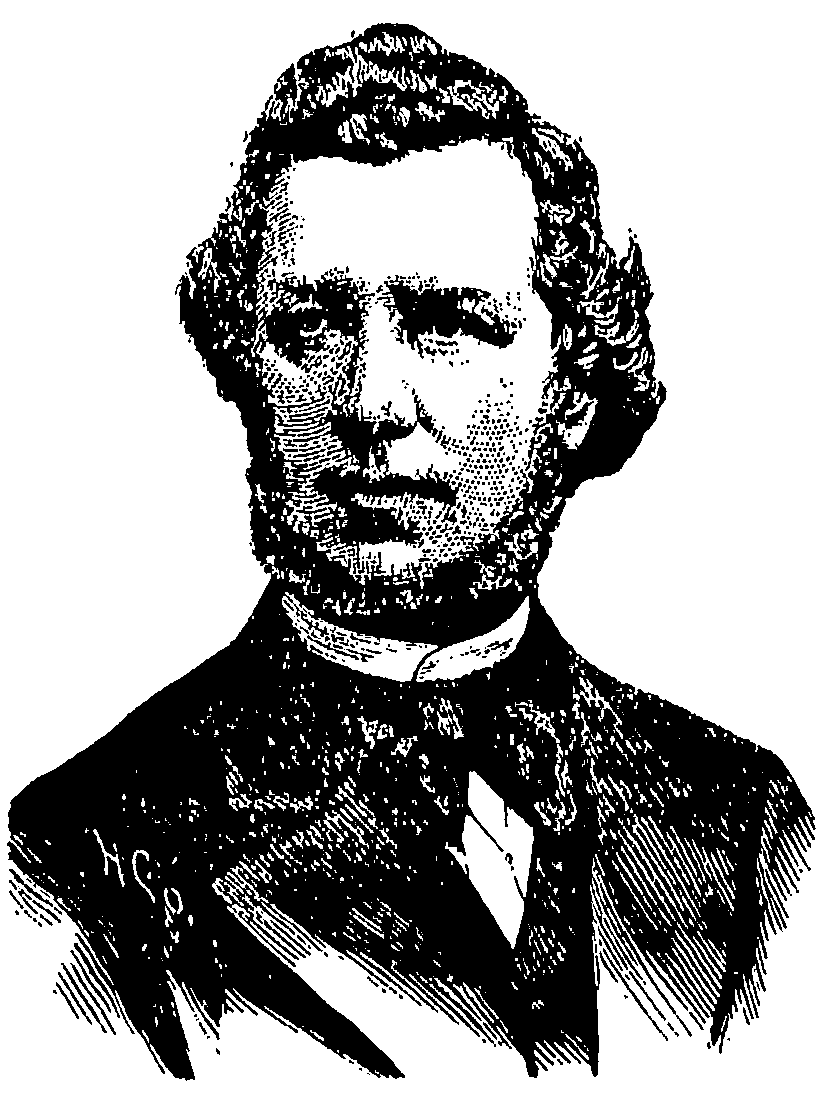
- Church: Church of Norway

Personal details
- Born: 20 May 1838 Holmestrand, Norway
- Died: 7 April 1896 (aged 57) Christiania

Frederik Wilhelm Klumpp Bugge (20 May 1838 – 7 April 1896) was a Norwegian theologian and politician for the Conservative Party.

== Personal life ==
Bugge was born in Trondhjem as a son of rector Frederik Moltke Bugge (1806–1853) and Anne Marie Magelssen (1811–1874). He was a nephew of professor Søren Bruun Bugge and grandson of bishop Peter Olivarius Bugge.

In May 1863 Bugge married Edvardine "Dina" Magdalene Margrethe Daae (1841–1921), a daughter of vicar Jens Kobro Daae (1811–1897) and sister of Norwegian-American physician Anders Daae. Their son Fredrik Moltke Bugge became a barrister and mayor of Kristiania. Through this son, who married a daughter of bishop Johan Christian Heuch, Wilhelm Bugge was a grandfather of barrister Wilhelm Bugge, and great-grandfather of barrister of Frederik Moltke Bugge and Supreme Court Justice Jens Bugge.

== Career ==
Bugge served as vicar at Holmestrand Church starting in 1866, before being appointed professor of theology at the Royal Frederick University in 1870. He was a theological conservative, and edited the magazine Luthersk Ugeskrift until 1880. He is best known for his popular exegeses of New Testament documents such as the Epistles of Paul, Epistles of Peter, Epistle of Jude, Acts of the Apostles, the Gospel of Luke and the Gospel of John. He also worked with a new translation of the New Testament, but this translation was ultimately published several years after his death, in 1904.

Bugge was also elected to the Parliament of Norway from the constituency Kristiania, Hønefoss og Kongsvinger in 1882, and served through the term 1883–1885. In 1893 he was appointed Bishop of Oslo. He served until his death in April 1896.

Church of Norway titles
Preceded by Carl Peter Parelius Essendrop	Bishop of Oslo; 1893–1896	Succeeded by Anton Christian Bang
