= Peter Andreas Munch =

Norwegian historian (1810–1863)

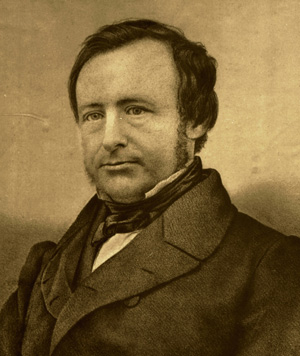
- Photograph of Peter Andreas Munch
- Born: 15 December 1810; Christiania (now Oslo), Norway
- Died: 25 May 1863 (aged 52); Rome, Italy
- Occupation: Historian
- Notable work: Det norske Folks Historie
- Relatives: Edvard Munch (nephew)

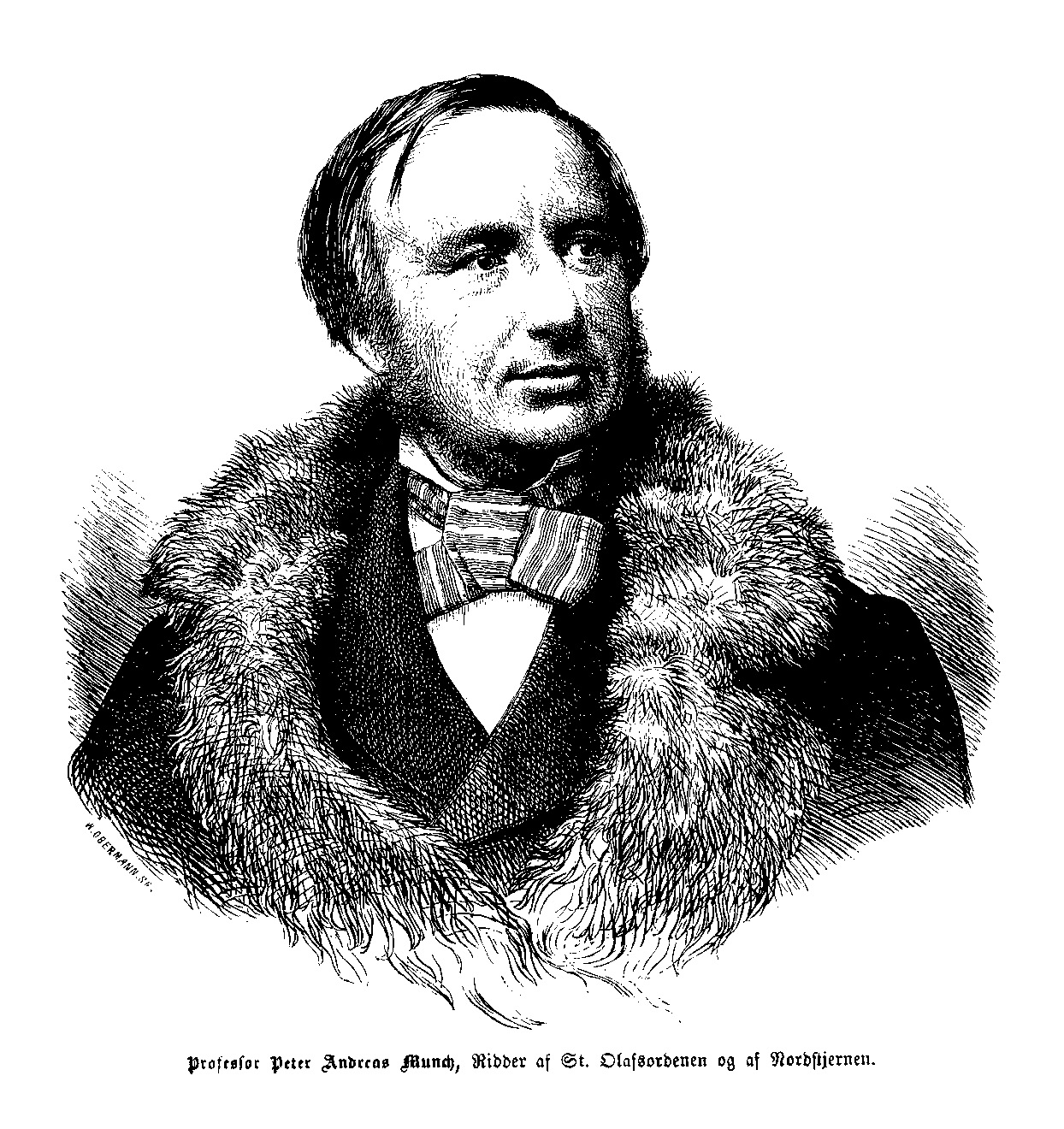
P. A. Munch. Engraving by W. Obermann

Peter Andreas Munch (15 December 1810 – 25 May 1863), usually known as P. A. Munch, was a Norwegian historian, known for his work on the medieval history of Norway. Munch's scholarship included Norwegian archaeology, geography, ethnography, linguistics, and jurisprudence. He was also noted for his Norse legendary saga translations.

== Background ==
Munch was born in Christiania (now Oslo). He was the son of Edvard Storm Munch and Johanne Sophie Hofgaard. Munch was the uncle of the famous painter Edvard Munch.

He grew up at the Gjerpen parsonage, where his father was parish priest of the Church of Norway. He was schooled in the city of Skien. He attended the Royal Frederick University. Munch first studied law and took his state examination in 1834, but then turned to historical and philological studies.

== Career ==
Munch's first great achievement, with Rudolph Keyser, was their three volumes of Norges Gamle Love (Norway's old laws), edited after a two-year research visit to Copenhagen. In 1837, he became lecturer in history at the University of Oslo and in 1841 became a professor of history. In 1857, after producing numerous publications, he received a large grant for archives research in Rome and lived there from 1859 to 1861. Munch served as Norway's national archivist from 1861 to 1863. He was one of the first non-Catholics to be allowed into the archives of the Vatican. He took extensive notes from the volumes of papal letters, and sometimes drew accurate facsimiles of the texts. His research there was useful in his main work, Det norske Folks Historie (History of the Norwegian People), in eight volumes, and he sent his notes home to the Royal Archives in Christiania. Among the theories he is remembered for is the theory on immigration to Norway, in which he developed work done by Rudolf Keyser. On a trip back to Rome to fetch his family, who had remained there for a while, he died from a stroke, and was buried in the Protestant Cemetery, Rome.

== The Chronicles of Mann and the Sudreys ==
In this work, Munch translated the 3rd Chronicle of the Chronicles of Mann from a Codex transferred to the British Museum (formerly owned in 1620 by one Sir Robert Cotton). The manuscript is the only known copy of this Codex (and thought to be the only one). In any event, Munch translated runic characters and added historical notes to lend light upon the writings, and using previous works on the history of Scottish and Icelandic Isles to aid in the presentation of the translated material. He also edited Chronica regvm Manniae et insvlarvm: The chronicle of Man and the Sudreys (1874) with Alexander Goss.

== Controversial views about the Finno-Ugric peoples ==
Munch claimed in his article on Finnish nationality (Om Finlands Nationalitet og dens Forhold til den svenske) in 1855, that Finns and Hungarians must have a human race of their own.

== Selected works ==
- Norges, Sveriges og Danmarks Historie til Skolebrug (1838)
- Norges Historie i kort Udtog for de første Begyndere (1839)
- Nordens gamle Gude- og Helte-Sagn i kortfattet Fremstilling (1840)
- Verdenshistoriens vigtigste Begivenheder (1840)
- De nyeste Tiders Historie (1842)
- Fortegnelse over de mest befarede Landeveie og Reiserouter saavel mellem Stæderne, som Landdistricterne i Norge (1846)
- Det oldnorske Sprogs eller Norrønasprogets Grammatik (with C. R. Unger, 1847)
- Underholdende Tildragelser af Norges Historie (1847)
- Nordmændenes Gudelære i Hedenold (1847)
- Det gotiske Sprogs Formlære (1848)
- Kortfattet Fremstilling af den ældste norske Runeskrift (1848)
- Om Skandinavismen (1849)
- Historisk-geographisk Beskrivelse over Kongeriget Norge (Noregsveldi) i Middelalderen (1849)
- Det norske Folks Historie (1852–1863)
- Om den saakaldte nyere historiske Skole i Norge (1853)
- Nordmændenes ældste Gude- og Helte-Sagn (1854)
- The Chronicle of Man and the Sudreys (1860)
