= Statoil corruption case =

The Statoil corruption case, also known as the Statoil-Horton case (Norwegian: Statoils Horton-sak) refers to Norwegian oil company Statoil’s misconduct and extensive use of bribery in Iran between 2002 and 2003, in an attempt to secure lucrative oil contracts for the company in that country.

This was mainly achieved by hiring the services of Horton Investments, an Iranian consultancy firm owned by Mehdi Hashemi Rafsanjani, son of former Iranian President Hashemi Rafsanjani. Horton Investments was paid US$15.2 million by Statoil to influence important political figures in Iran to grant oil contracts to Statoil. The corruption scandal was uncovered by Norwegian paper Dagens Næringsliv on September 3, 2003.

Although this case became infamous in the western media and Statoil was found guilty by the Norwegian courts, no verdict was reported by the Iranian media regarding Rafsanjani's bribery case. Rafsanjani was later sentenced to 10 years in prison for corruption, but was freed after 7 years.

== Verdict reached by the Norwegian court ==
On June 29, 2004, Statoil was found guilty of corruption by the Norwegian courts and was ordered to pay NOK 20 million in fines. Statoil's Director for International Operations, Richard John Hubbard was also ordered to pay NOK 200,000 in fines for his involvement in the case.

The uncovering of the corruption scandal also led to the resignation of Hubbard, Statoil Chairman Leif Terje Løddesøl, and Statoil CEO Olav Fjell. The charges against Olav Fjell were later dropped, owing to insufficient evidence. Statoil agreed to pay the fines, but insisted that this did not imply any admittance of guilt on its part.

== US settlement ==
On October 13, 2006, Statoil reached a settlement with US authorities for its involvement in the case and was ordered by the United States District Court for the Southern District of New York to pay US$10.5 million in fines under a deferred prosecution agreement. It also paid US$10.5 million to the SEC for a total of 21 million dollars. In paying the fine, Statoil took "responsibility for bribery" and agreed it had "improperly" accounted for the payments in its books. Hubbard’s actions led to one of the largest fines ever imposed by the United States for violations of the Foreign Corrupt Practices Act.

As part of the settlement agreement, Statoil had to agree to the following counts:

1. Statoil agreed that it had paid bribes to an Iranian public servant in June 2002 and January 2003, with the aim of securing contracts for Statoil in the development of stages 6,7,8 of the South Pars gas field in Iran.
2. Statoil agreed that bribes were paid to secure other contracts in the country, and to get hold of confidential information.
3. Statoil agreed that it had used wrong accounting procedures in order to hide the bribes from its records.

The settlement also stipulated that no Statoil employee or representative for the company could make any statements to the media that contradicted the verdict for the next three years.

In 2009, the company and the US government announced that it had successfully completed the deferred prosecution agreement, and the charges were dismissed.

== Reactions ==
Former Iranian ambassador to Norway and defector Perviz Khazai criticized Statoil strongly for its business methods in Iran. In a statement he said that:

This smells to high heavens of corruption. And this incident can contribute to the tarnishing of Norway's reputation.

He also went on record to say that the Rafsanjani family were known for their close links to corruption. Jan Borgen of Transparency International Norway was also highly critical of Statoil's conduct in Iran. When asked to make a comment on the case by Norwegian newspaper Aftenposten, he said:

It is true that you can hardly get into these countries without using agents or advisers. But here, like anywhere else, you should know your agents. It is always dangerous to get involved with a consultant who has close contacts to the political elite.

Helge Lund, who succeeded Olav Fjell as CEO of Statoil, has also publicly admitted that the corruption scandal tarnished Statoil and Norway's reputation abroad.
