= Nordenfjeldske Teglverk =

Norwegian brick manufacturer

Det Nordenfjeldske Teglverk was a brick manufacturer in Skånland Municipality in Troms county, Norway.

It was started in 1942 at Sandstrand in Skånland Municipality. Local entrepreneurs were backed by capital from Oslo. The factory had a capacity of 3.5-4 million bricks. It went bankrupt in 1970; after a hiatus the factory was restarted and operated for three more years. It was finally closed in 1975.
