= Knut Rasmussen (physician) =

Norwegian professor of medicine (born 1938)

Knut Rasmussen (born 27 July 1938) is a Norwegian professor of medicine.

He was born in Oslo. He was hired as chief physician at Tromsø Regional Hospital in 1974, and became professor of internal medicine at the University of Tromsø in 1977. His special field is heart research. He was also dean of the Faculty of Medicine from 1986 to 1989.

He was decorated as a Knight, First Class of the Order of St. Olav in 2005.
