= Ulrich Stang =

Norwegian diplomat

Ulrich Stang (20 January 1887 – 23 October 1972) was a Norwegian diplomat and member of Nasjonal Samling.

In 1940 he was stationed at the Norwegian legation in Berlin. In retrospect he was criticized for not bringing forward warning messages regarding the German invasion of Norway. In the legal purge in Norway after World War II however, he was only convicted for treason based on his NS membership. He was sentenced to four years of forced labour.
