= Norske Zinkprodukter =

Norwegian manufacturing company

Norske Zinkprodukter was a manufacturing company in Oslo, Norway.

It was started in 1934 at Bryn, Oslo to produce the painting color zinc white, constituted by zinc oxide.
