= Knut Rasmussen (barrister) =

Norwegian barrister

Knut Rasmussen (6 October 1925 — 31 July 2003) was a Norwegian barrister.

In 1966, he established the law firm Bugge, Arentz-Hansen og Rasmussen (BA-HR) together with Lars Arentz-Hansen and Frederik Moltke Bugge. BA-HR became one of Norway's most prestigious law firms.

He also chaired the supervisory council of UNI Storebrand. After Jan Erik Langangen's demise as chief executive officer in 1992, the supervisory council chose Rasmussen's partner in BA-HR Anders Eckhoff to succeed Thorleif Borge as UNI Storebrand's chair. Rasmussen subsequently stepped down as chair of the supervisory council in favor of Harald Arnkværn.
