= Agnes Magnell =

Swedish architect (1878–1966)

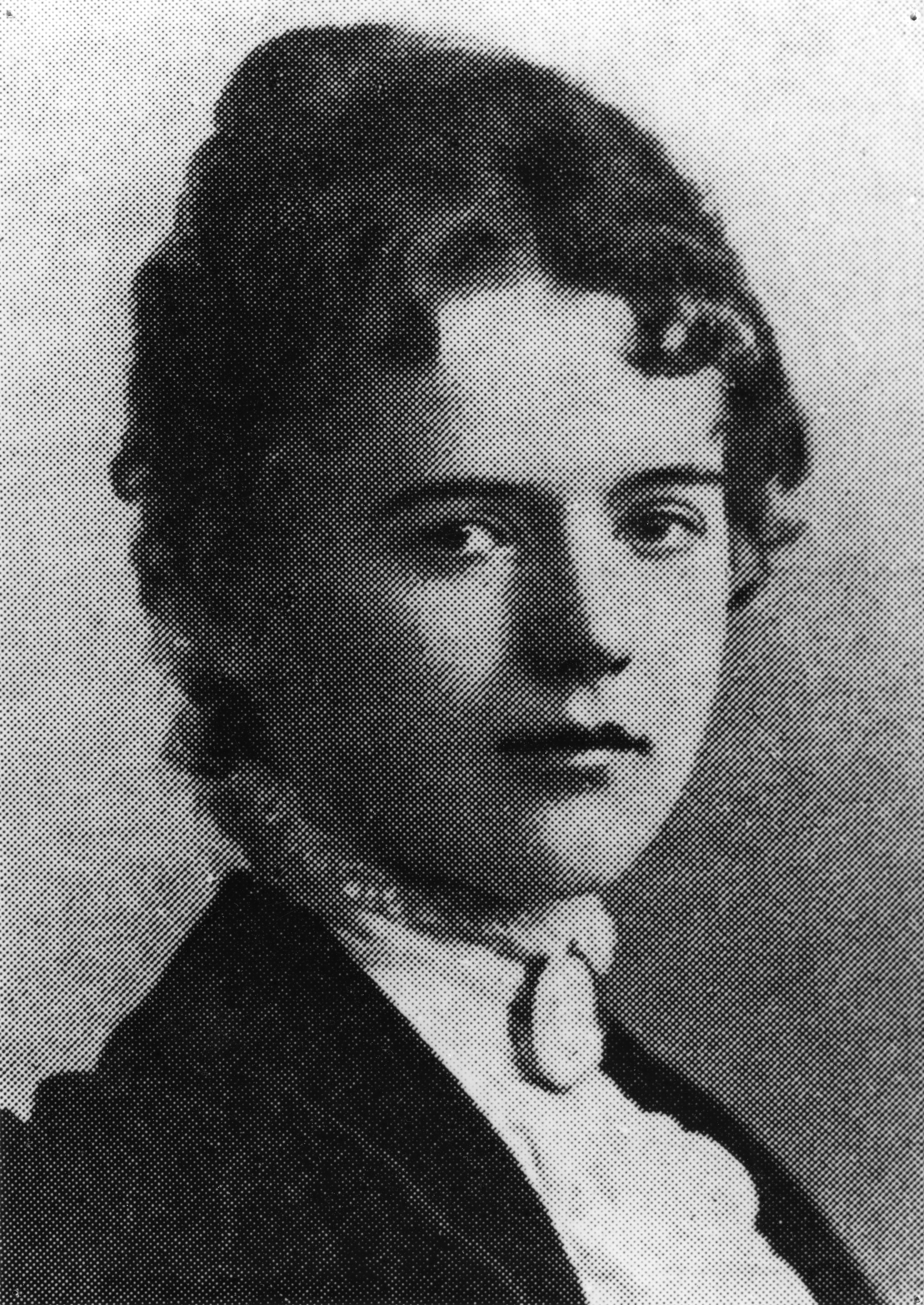

Agnes Magnell (26 November 1878, Uddevalla – 1966) was a Swedish architect. She was the first woman in Sweden to be admitted to the Royal Institute of Technology to study architecture.

== Life and work ==
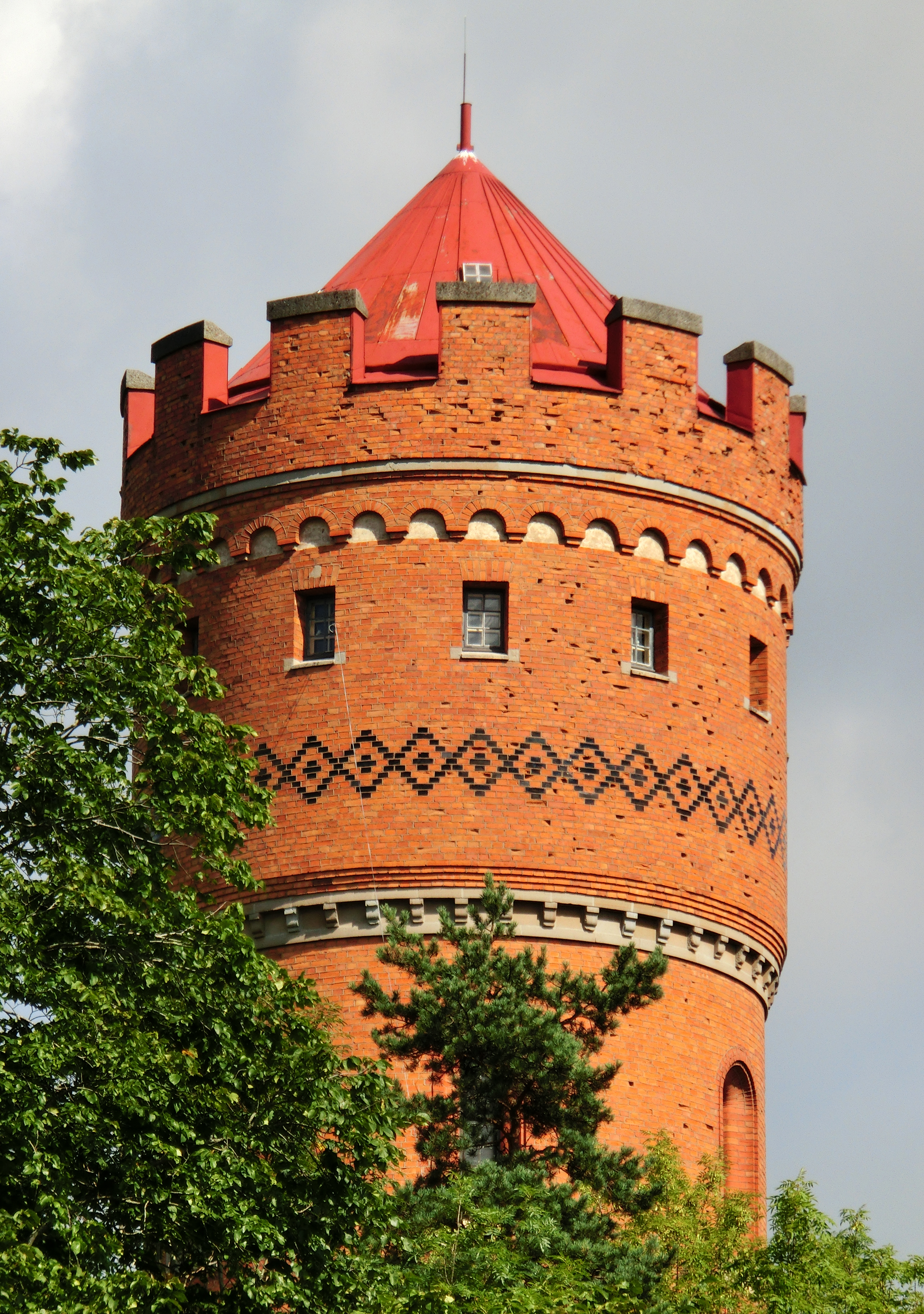
Water tower in Sala, designed by Agnes Magnell

Agnes Magnell came from an affluent family, her father was an officer and a landowner. She started artistic studies in 1894 at Konstfack in Stockholm and was there encouraged by one of her teachers to apply to study architecture at the Royal Institute of Technology. Although in principle women were not allowed to study at the institute, an exception was made after her father had written a formal request to the King in Council. She was the first woman to be admitted to the school for the purpose of studying architecture. She studied at the Royal Institute of Technology for four years. In the last year of her studies she met and married an engineer named Schmitt, and spent some time working with her husband designing water towers and electricity power plants. She never graduated, and after a few years stopped working actively to instead become a housewife. The water tower in Sala is an example of her work.
