= Hanne Heuch =

Norwegian ceramist

Hanne Heuch (born 1 June 1954) is a Norwegian ceramist.

She was born in Oslo, and is the great-granddaughter of bishop Johan Christian Heuch. She took her education at the Norwegian National Academy of Crafts and Design (now a part of the Bergen National Academy of the Arts) and Norwegian National Academy of Craft and Art Industry. She was a professor at the Academy of Crafts and Design from 1988 to 1994 and is among Norway's foremost ceramists.
