= Johan Christian Heuch =

Norwegian politician (1838–1904)

The Right Reverend Johan Christian Heuch
- Bishop of Kristiansand
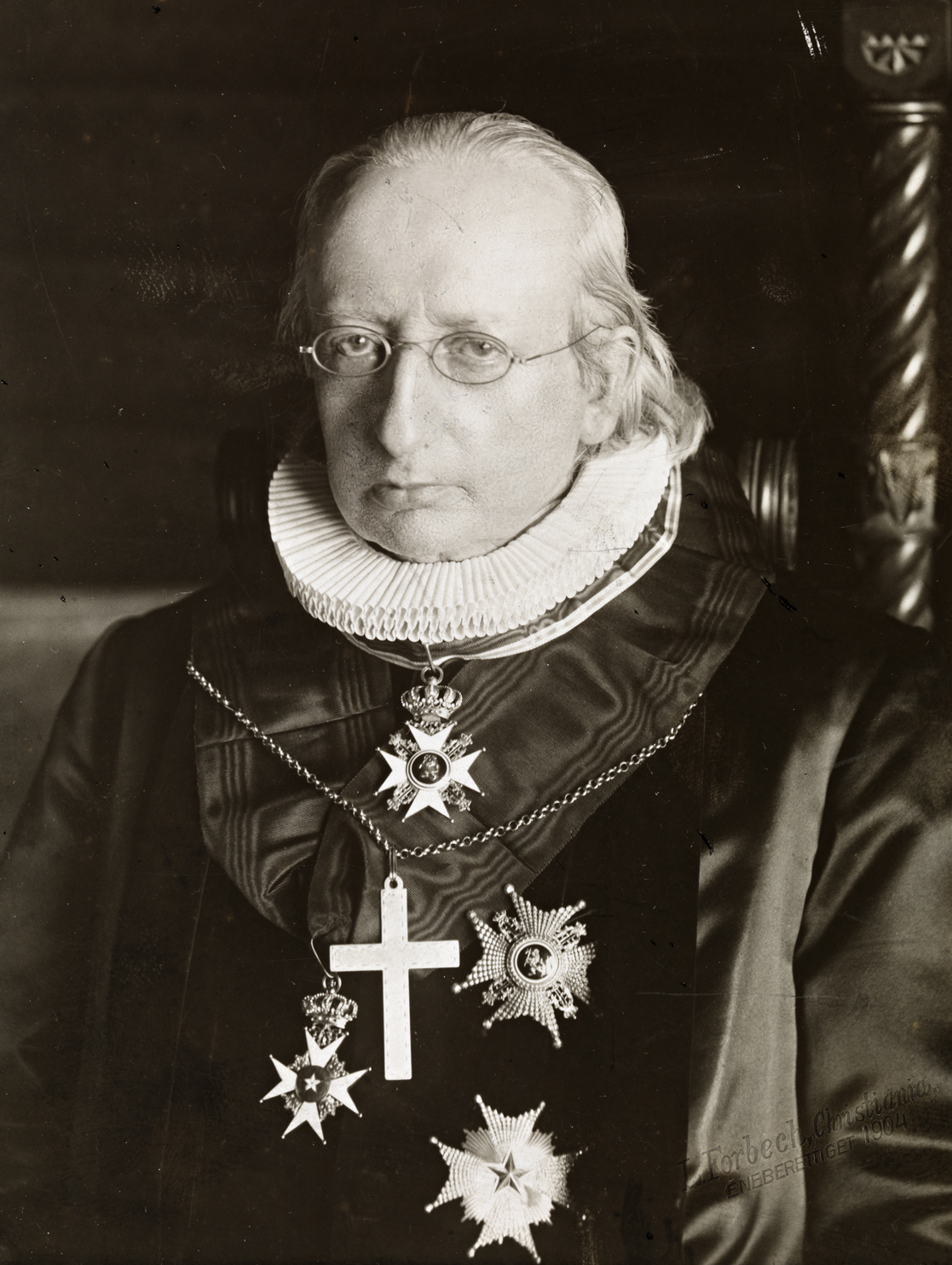
- Church: Church of Norway
- Diocese: Diocese of Kristiansand
- Appointed: 1889
- In office: 1889–1904
- Predecessor: Jacob Sverdrup Smitt
- Successor: Gunvald Thorkildsen
- Other posts: Teacher at the Practical-Theological Seminary; Magazine editor

Orders
- Ordination: 1865

Personal details
- Born: 23 March 1838 Kragerø, Norway
- Died: 13 February 1904 (aged 65) Kristiansand, Norway
- Denomination: Lutheran
- Parents: Johan Christian Heuch and Christine Elisabeth Bonnevie
- Spouse: Kirsten Elieson
- Occupation: Priest
- Education: Royal Frederick University

Johan Christian Heuch or J. C. Heuch (23 March 1838–13 February 1904) was a Norwegian bishop in the Church of Norway and politician for the Conservative Party.

== Personal life ==
He was born in Kragerø, Norway as the son of merchant and politician Johan Christian Heuch (1794–1843) and his wife Christine Elisabeth Bonnevie (1803–1863). His paternal grandfather Peter Andreas Heuch (1756–1825) was among the wealthiest persons in Southern Norway. On the maternal side he was a great-grandson of Honoratus Bonnevie and a first cousin of Jacob Aall Bonnevie; the latter was the father of zoologist Kristine Elisabeth Heuch Bonnevie.

In December 1861, he married Kirsten Anna Janette Elieson (1839–1913), a daughter of jurist and politician John Collett Postumus Elieson. Their daughter Kristine Elisabeth married barrister Fredrik Moltke Bugge. Other direct descendants of J. C. Heuch include ceramicist Hanne Heuch.

== Career ==
Despite the merchant background of his family, J. C. Heuch embarked on an academic career. His father died before J. C. turned five years old, and at the age of fifteen he moved to Christiania to be educated. He finished his secondary education in 1856 when he received his examen artium. He then graduated from the Royal Frederick University with the cand.theol. degree in 1861. Among his lecturers at the university was the orthodox Lutheran Gisle Johnson. Because of health issues, Heuch did not intend to work as a clergyman; however he was headhunted by priest and writer Jørgen Moe, and worked under him as a curate in the parish of Bragernes. He was ordained in 1865. In 1869, he followed Moe to his new position in the parish of Vestre Aker.

Due to his health he had to take a sabbatical in Rome from 1873 to 1874, but when he returned to Norway he was hired as a priest working in municipal and private institutions of Christiania. Starting in 1875, he was also a teacher at the Practical-Theological Seminary at the Royal Frederick University. He also edited the magazines Luthersk Kirketidende from 1875 and Luthersk Ugeskrift from 1877. He was hired as the vicar of Uranienborg in Christiania in 1880, and his sermons became well-attended.

Theologically, he was orthodox, like his former lecturer Gisle Johnson. He became known for the 1883 publication Vantroens Væsen, the printing of a series of lectures from 1881 where he denounced infidelity. He later issued Kirken og vantroen (1888). He referred to Jens Jonas Jansen, a priest on the liberal side of the spectrum, as a "dangerous" man in 1902. Other adversaries of his in the public debate were Arne Garborg, Bjørnstjerne Bjørnson (whom he nonetheless knew on a personal level), Georg Brandes, and liberal ideologist Ernst Sars.

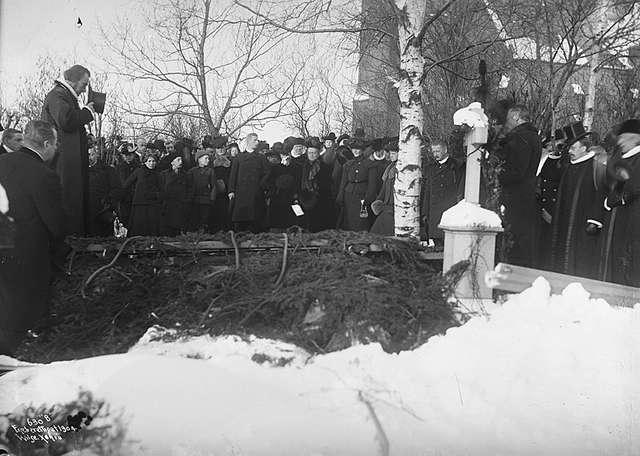
Heuch's funeral on 19 February 1904.

Politically, he belonged to the Conservative Party, strongly supporting High Church Lutheranism against the laity movement affiliated with the Liberal, and later, Moderate Liberal parties. He was selected as a member of the central committee of the Conservative Party at its foundation in 1884. For the term 1889–1891 he served as a deputy representative to the Norwegian Parliament, representing the constituency of Kristiania, Hønefoss og Kongsvinger, and when Emil Stang became Prime Minister, Heuch took his seat in Parliament.

In 1889, Heuch was appointed as the new bishop of the Diocese of Kristiansand. The laity movement had a stronghold in this part of the country, and despite the fear of some, Heuch came to terms with these parts of the Church. He became a popular bishop, especially when visiting the parishes. He remained bishop until his death in 1904.

== Honors ==
He was a Commander, First Class of the Royal Norwegian Order of St. Olav from 1896, and held the Grand Cross of the Swedish Order of the Polar Star. The road Biskop Heuchs vei in Nordre Aker has been named for him.

Religious titles
Preceded by Jacob Sverdrup Smitt	Bishop of Kristiansand; 1889–1904	Succeeded by Gunvald Thorkildsen
