= Peter Olivarius Bugge =

Norwegian priest and politician

Right Reverend Peter Olivarius Bugge
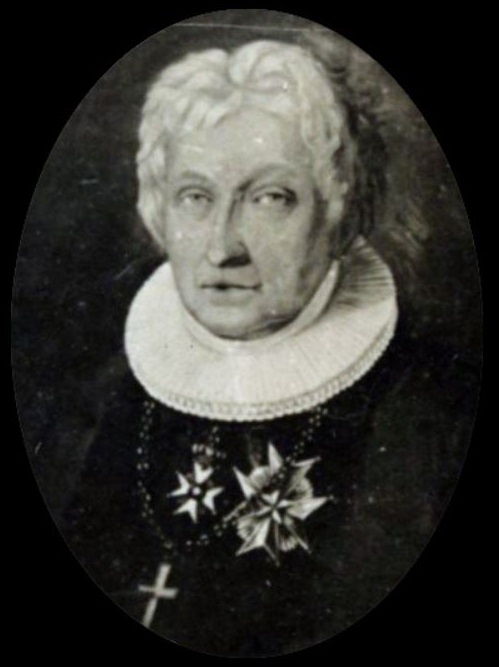

Personal details
- Born: 2 December 1764 Holt, Norway
- Died: 6 December 1849 (aged 85) Trondheim, Norway
- Denomination: Christian
- Parents: Søren Bugge; Gidsken Edvardine Røring
- Spouse: Cathrine Magdalene Koch (1787–1849)
- Children: Frederik Moltke Bugge; Søren Bruun Bugge
- Occupation: Priest and Politician
- Education: Doctor of Theology (University of Copenhagen)

Peter Olivarius Bugge (2 December 1764 – 6 December 1849) was a Norwegian priest and politician. He was the bishop of the Diocese of Nidaros from 1804 until 1842.

== Biography ==
Peter Olivarius Bugge was born at Holt in Nedenes county, Norway. He was the son of the parish priest Søren Bugge (1721–94) and Gidsken Edvardine Røring (1724–93). After four years of schooling in Bergen, he attended Kristiansand Cathedral School. He graduated from the University of Copenhagen (cand.theol. 1786, magister 1787).

He was a priest in various parishes in Sjælland, Jylland, and Lista before being appointed to the post of Bishop of the Diocese of Trondhjem when he was only 40 years old in 1804.

Bugge took part at the Norwegian Constituent Assembly at Eidsvoll in 1814 where a constitution was written. He was then elected as the first representative to the new Parliament from Trondheim 1815–1816. As Bishop of Trondhjem, Bugge gave the sermon at the coronation of the new King Karl Johan on 7 September 1818 at the Nidaros Cathedral.

Bugge published a missionary magazine, Efterretninger om Evangelii Fremgang i alle Verdens-Dele (1821–22). He later showed sympathy for the Pietism movement and defended Haugean lay preachers; he was the only bishop to call for the repeal of the Conventicle Act, which banned religious gatherings separate from the state church. In later years, Bugge was bothered by impaired health. His resignation was accepted at the bishops' assembly in 1842.

== Personal life ==
In 1787, Bugge was married to Cathrine Magdalene Koch (1787–1849). He died in 1849 at Trondheim. He was the father of Frederik Moltke Bugge (1806–1853), rector at Trondheim Cathedral School and Søren Bruun Bugge (1798–1886), rector of Christiania Cathedral School. His grandchildren included Johannes Christian Piene and Wilhelm Bugge.

Church of Norway
Preceded by Johan Christian Schønheyder	Bishop of Trondhjem; 1804–1842	Succeeded by Hans Riddervold
