= Anders Bugge =

Norwegian art historian (1889–1955)

- Born: 1 May 1889; Sandsvær, Kongsberg, Norway
- Died: 25 December 1955 (aged 66)
- Education: Theologist
- Occupation: Art historian
- Employers: Norwegian Directorate for Cultural Heritage; University of Oslo

Anders Bugge (1 May 1889 – 25 December 1955) was a Norwegian theologist and art historian.

== Biography ==
Anders Ragnar Bugge was born in Sandsvær in Kongsberg, Norway. He was the son of Christian August Bugge (1853–1928) and Dina Alette Danielsen (1855–1933). His father was a theologian and a chaplain at Botsfengslet. He attended the University of Kristiania, where he graduated with a degree in art in 1907 and became cand.theol. in 1914. In 1912–18 he was assistant and later curator at the Museum of Art and Design in Kristiania. In 1929 he defended his doctoral dissertation.

Anders Bugge was a theologian by education, but came to dedicate his life to art history. He worked several years for the Norwegian Directorate for Cultural Heritage and was appointed professor at the University of Oslo from 1936 to 1955. He was a member of the Norwegian Academy of Science and Letters and was decorated Knight of the Swedish Order of the Polar Star.
