= Frederik Moltke Bugge =

Norwegian philologist and educator

Frederik Moltke Bugge (23 September 1806 – 9 July 1853) was a Norwegian philologist and educator.

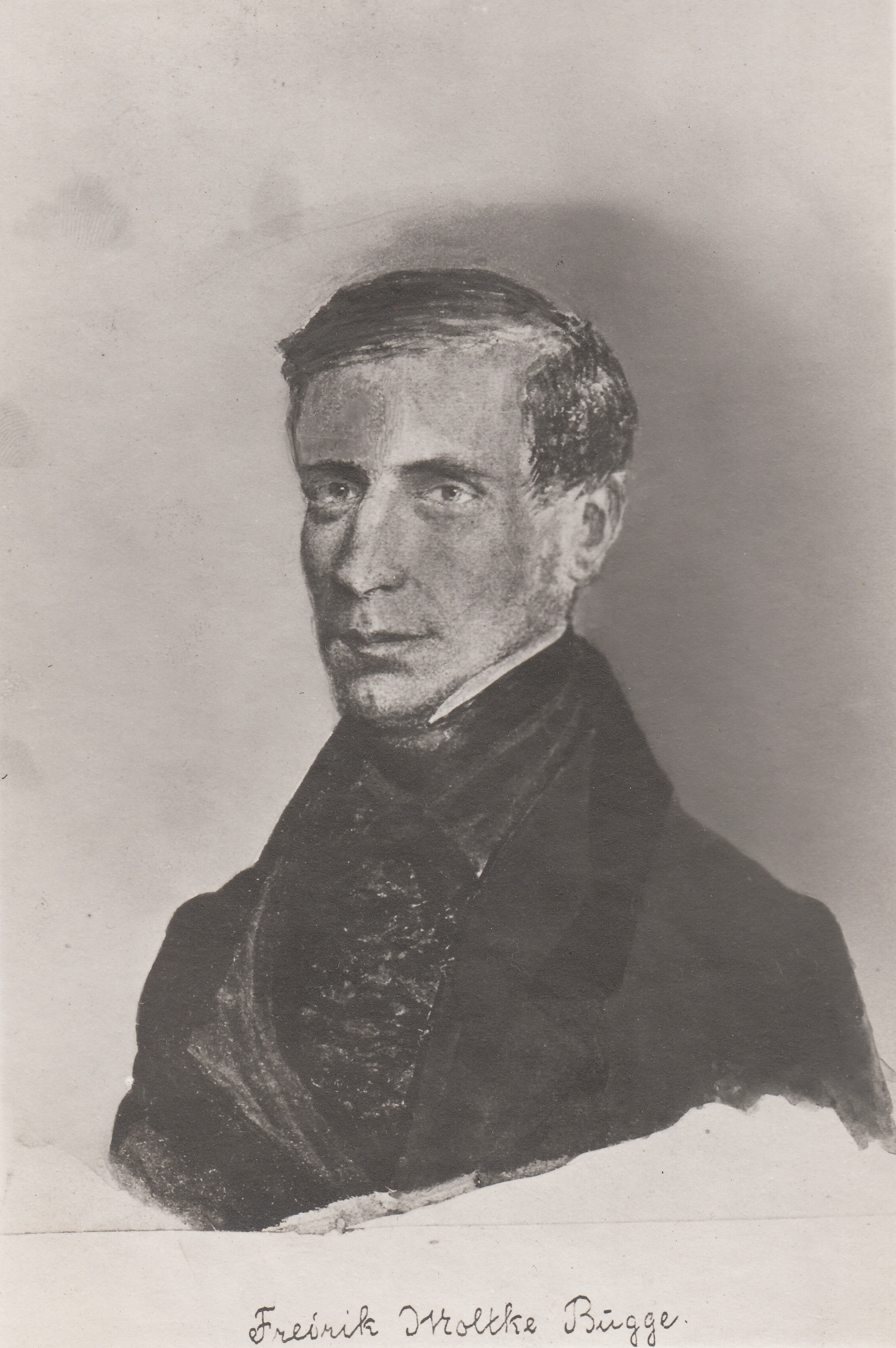
Frederik Moltke Bugge

== Early and personal life ==
Bugge was born in Trondhjem as a son of bishop Peter Olivarius Bugge (1764–1849) and Cathrine Magdalene Koch (1771–1869). Bugge graduated from Trondhjem Cathedral School in 1823 and from the Royal Frederick University with the cand.philol. degree in 1829. In September 1831, in Christiania he married Anne Marie Magelssen (1811–1874). Their son Wilhelm Bugge became a bishop. Bugge was also uncle of Johannes Christian Piene and great-grandfather of Leif Vetlesen.

== Career ==
Bugge was hired as principal at Trondhjem Cathedral School in 1833. He was a school reformer, and first published his thoughts on the school system in 1835's Om de Hindringer der i vore Dage fornemmelig møde de lærde Skolers Virksomhed. Bugge was sent by the Norwegian state to study schools in France and German states from 1836 to 1837. In 1838 he finished his reflections from the travel, in three volumes. Named Det offentlige Skolevæsens Forfatning i adskillige tydske Stater, tilligemed Ideer til en Reorganisation af det offentlige Skolevæsen i Kongeriget Norge, the work was published by the Norwegian state the next year, and even awarded with a gold medal by Frederick Augustus II of Saxony. In 1839, Bugge got a seat on the public commission Skolekommisjonen av 1839.

Bugge had ideas that bore stems of the comprehensive school thought. He was inspired by Grundtvig's idea about educating the masses, and also supported Ivar Aasen's endeavors. However, he also wanted to protect the "learned" schools, which taught classical subjects, from too much influence from natural sciences and modern languages. A public polemic ensued between "classicists" and "realists"; Herman Foss and Anton Martin Schweigaard adhered to the latter. Among Bugge's supporters were professor and later principal of Christiania Cathedral School Ludvig Vibe. Although the classical subjects declined and never recovered, Bugge all in all became known as one of the "grand school strategists in 19th-century Norway", together with Ole Vig and Hartvig Nissen. Bugge was also a member of Royal Norwegian Society of Sciences and Letters from 1833, and praeses (chairman) from 1838 to 1851. He was also Mayor of Trondheim in 1845, 1849 and 1850.

Bugge's public fall came in 1851, when he was forced to retire from Trondhjem Cathedral School, having battled alcoholism for some years. When he translated the Iliad in 1852, he was ridiculed and parodied in parts of the Norwegian press, mainly because he wrote too dialectical. Bugge settled in Bergen where he worked as a private tutor until his death in July 1853.

Political offices
Preceded by Samuel Severin Bætzmann	Mayor of Trondheim; 1845	Succeeded by Hans Peter Jenssen, Sr.
Preceded by Jens Nicolai Jenssen	Mayor of Trondheim; 1849–1850	Succeeded by Samuel Severin Bætzmann
Academic offices
Preceded by Christian Hersleb Hornemann	Praeses of the Royal Norwegian Society of Sciences and Letters; 1838–1851	Succeeded by Hans Jørgen Darre
