= Olav Hytta =

Norwegian businessperson (born 1943)

Olav Hytta (born 2 July 1943) is a Norwegian businessperson.

Hytta has a varied education, in both sciences, business administration and agriculture. He was hired by Hjartdal Sparebank in 1964, and by Fellesbanken in 1968. He was CEO of ABC Bank, later director of the Oslo/Akershus area of Sparebanken NOR, and the deputy CEO of Sparebanken NOR, and Gjensidige NOR until he was hired as CEO of Gjensidige NOR from 2000 to it merged to create DnB NOR in 2003.

In 2003 he became chairman of DnB NOR. In 2008 he was succeeded by Anne Carine Tanum.

Business positions
Preceded by Jannik Lindbæk (in Den norske Bank); Bjørn Sund (in Gjensidige NOR)	Chair of DnB NOR; 2003–2008	Succeeded by Anne Carine Tanum
