= Gunn Wærsted =

Norwegian businesswoman

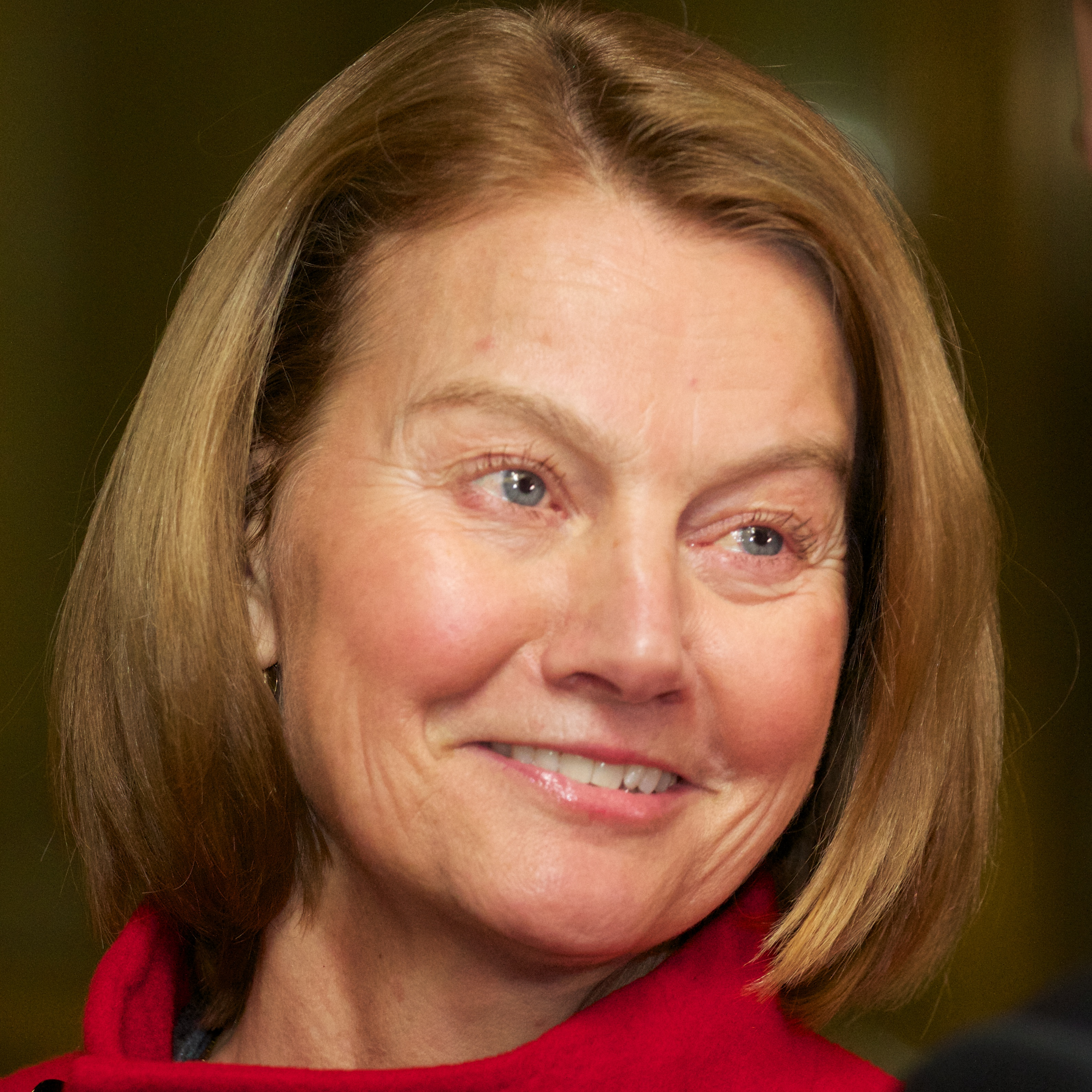
- Wærsted in 2014
- Born: March 16, 1955 (age 70); Vråliosen, Norway
- Education: BI Norwegian Business School (siv.øk.)
- Occupation: business executive
- Employer(s): SpareBank 1 Gruppen; Den norske Bank; Nordea; Vital Forsikring; Telenor

Gunn Wærsted (born 16 March 1955) is a Norwegian businessperson, with prominent positions in finance and banking.

She was born in Vråliosen as a daughter of power plant manager Atle W. Wærsted and Ester Helgerud (1920–). The family moved to Drammen when Wærsted was six years old. She graduated with the siv.øk. degree from BI Norwegian Business School in 1979. She was hired in Andenæsgruppen as a secretary in the same year, and soon advanced to chief financial officer. She left five years later to work in the investment company Nevi in Fyllingsdalen. The company Nevi Investor was established in 1987, and later changed its name to DnB Investor. Nevi had been bought by Bergen Bank which was then bought by Den norske Bank (DnB). Wærsted was a director in Den norske Bank from 1993 to 1995. Den norske Bank then bought Vital, and from 1996 to 2001 Wærsted was the CEO of Vital Forsikring and of DnB Holdning. In 2001 she was headhunted as CEO of Sparebank 1 Gruppen. In 2007 she resigned in Sparebank 1 Gruppen, and one month later she was hired in the Group Executive Management of multinational company Nordea. She became the country senior executive in Norway in 2008.

In October 2000, when the Norwegian State Railways had been rocked by turmoil for a while, Wærsted was installed as deputy chair in the board. She left in June 2001. When she left the DnB system later in 2001 she was the chair of DnB Kapitalforvaltning, DnB Investor, Fondsforsikringsselskapet Vital Link and Vital Skade. She was also a board member of BI Norwegian Business School and Doorstep, and is a corporate council member of Orkla Group and council member of Det Norske Veritas and the Norwegian Banks' Guarantee Fund. From 2005 to 2007 she chaired the Norwegian Financial Services Association. She is now a board member of both the Norwegian Financial Services Association and Finance Norway. Her tenure as chairman of the board at Telenor ASA has been characterized by a bitter personality conflict with the CEO, Sigve Brekke.

Business positions
Preceded by Tom Ruud	Country senior executive of Nordea in Norway; 2008–present	Incumbent
