= Sparebanken ABC =

Norwegian savings bank

- Industry: Banking
- Founded: 1985
- Defunct: 1990
- Fate: Merged
- Successor: Sparebanken NOR
- Headquarters: Oslo, Norway

Sparebanken ABC, sometimes branded as ABC Bank, was a Norwegian savings bank based in Oslo, in existence between 1985 and 1990. The bank was a merger between Sparebanken Oslo/Akershus (founded in 1822 as Christiania Sparebank) and Fellesbanken (founded in 1920). The bank lasted until 1990 when it merged with four other savings banks in Eastern Norway to create Sparebanken NOR. The bank is now part of DnB NOR after Sparebanken NOR merged with Gjensidige to create Gjensidige NOR in 1999 and Gjensidige NOR merged with Den norske Bank in 2003 to create DnB NOR.
