= Svein Aaser =

Norwegian businessman

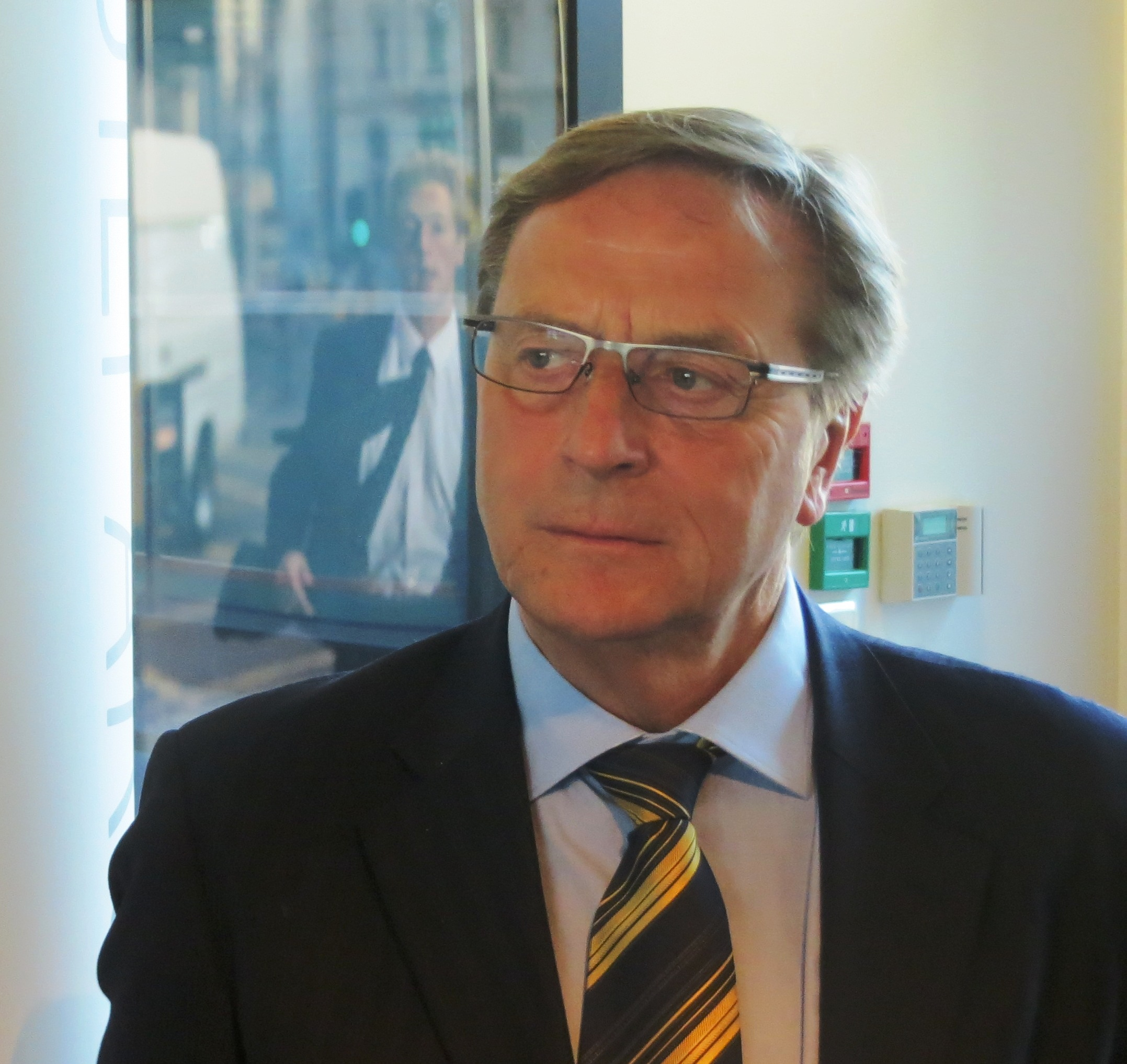
- Svein Aaser, 2013.
- Born: 7 October 1946 (age 79); Fredrikstad, Norway
- Education: MBA
- Board member of: FIS Nordic World Ski Championships 2011; National Gallery of Norway; Marine Harvest

Svein Aaser (born 7 October 1946) is a former CEO of DnB NOR, the largest financial group in Norway. He resigned on 31 December 2006. He is chair of FIS Nordic World Ski Championships 2011 and the National Gallery of Norway

== Early career ==
Aaser was born in Fredrikstad, Norway and was educated at the Norwegian School of Economics (NHH) where he received his MBA in 1970. By 1976, he had graduated from the Swiss IMD Business School's Program for Executive Development. After obtaining his MBA (1970) he worked his way up in businesses starting as assistant to deputy managing director for Tank Nielsen, M. Peterson & Søn, Moss. From there he became marketing manager of Sarpsborg Papp, Div. Kartong, managing director for NORA matprodukter and of Storebrand Skade.

== Later career ==
During a period of ten years starting in 1987 he was president and CEO of Hafslund Nycomed who changed its name after the acquisition of Nycomed. The year after saw him deputy CEO and chief executive officer of a subsidiary company called Imaging Nycomed Amersham. In 1998 he was appointed CEO of Den norske Bank, later the merged DnB NOR.

In 2008 he was appointed chairman of the board of the National Gallery of Norway. He has also been the chairman of Marine Harvest, but stepped down in January 2010. He also chairs Statkraft. From 2012 to 2015 he was chairman of the board of Telenor.

Business positions
Preceded by Emil Eriksrud	Chief executive of Hafslund; 1987–1996	Succeeded by Hans Tormod Hansen
Preceded by Finn Hvistendahl	Chief executive officer of DnB NOR; 1998–2006	Succeeded by Rune Bjerke
