= Arne Hyttnes =

Norwegian banker (born 1950)

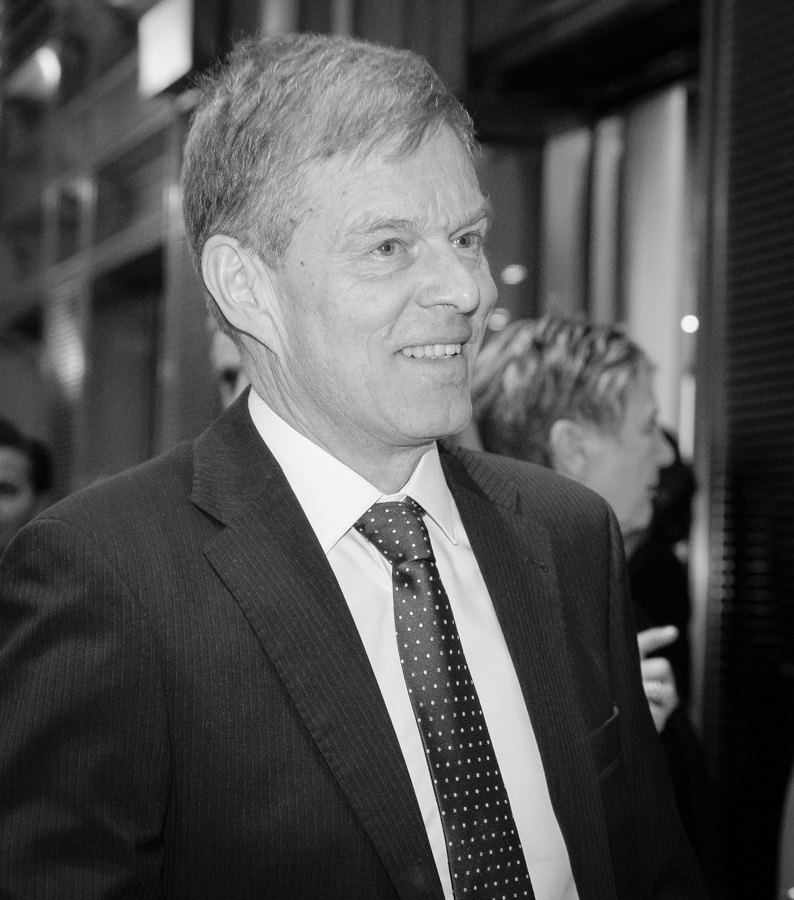
Arne Hyttnes

Arne Hyttnes (born 29 June 1950) is a Norwegian banker.

He hails from Lesjaskog, and graduated from the Norwegian School of Economics and Business Administration with the siv.øk. degree in 1975. He started his career in Arthur Andersen & Co in 1975, and was then hired in Den norske Creditbank in 1976. He was the bank's regional director in Oslo in the 1980s. The bank was bought by Bergen Bank which was bought by Den norske Bank. In the latter company he became regional director in Innlandet, based in Gjøvik. In 1997 he was appointed as the managing director of the Norwegian Industrial and Regional Development Fund. He remained here until 2002, when he was hired as managing director in the Norwegian Savings Banks Association. In late 2009 he was selected to double as managing director of the new organization Finance Norway. He is also the manager for the Norwegian Banks' Guarantee Fund.

He still resides in Gjøvik.

Civic offices
Preceded by Tore Tønne	Director of the Norwegian Industrial and Regional Development Fund; 1997–2002	Succeeded by Gunn Ovesen
