= Frode Helgerud =

Norwegian politician (born 1950)

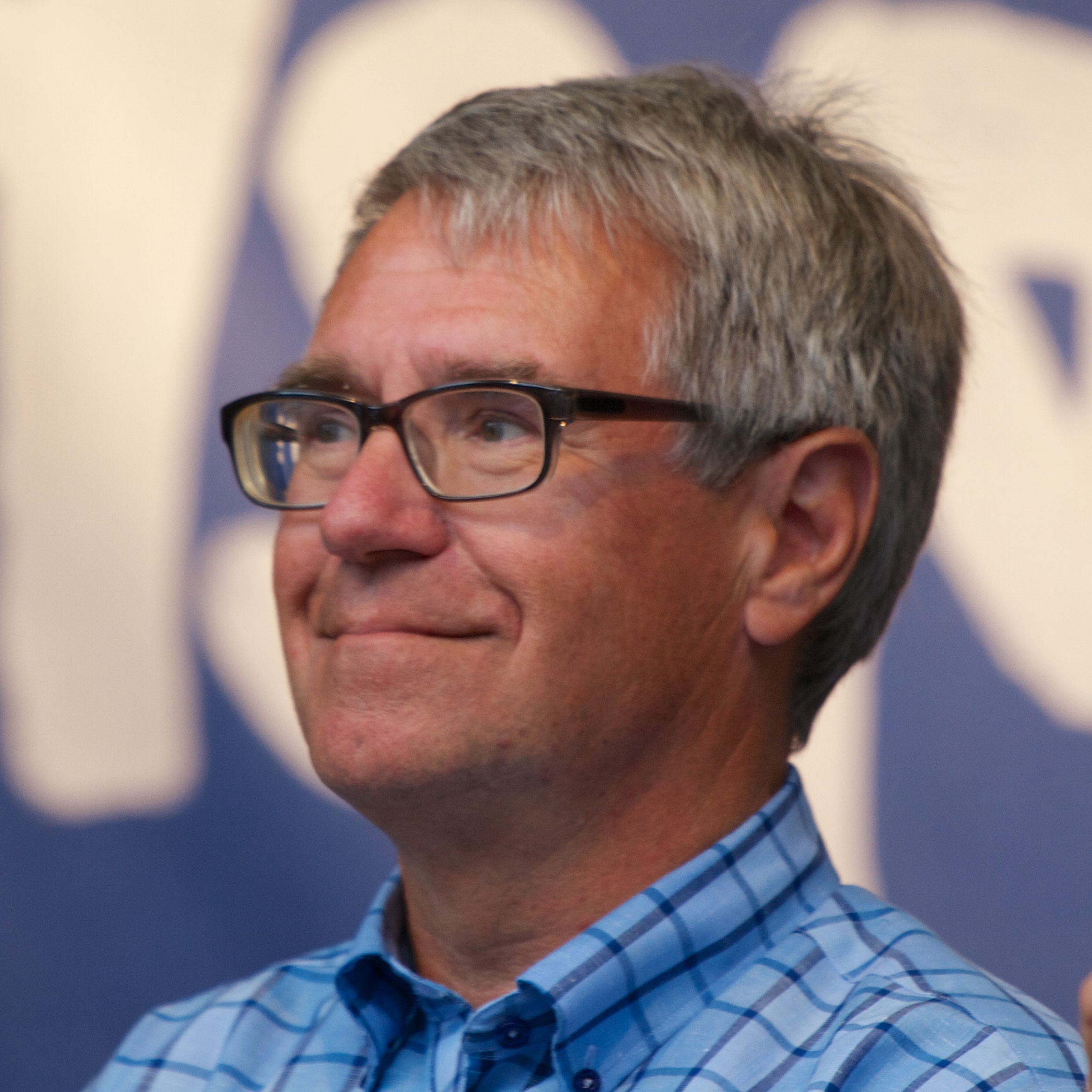
- Born: June 17, 1950; Oslo, Norway
- Occupation: businessman

Frode Helgerud (born 17 June 1950) is a Norwegian businessperson and politician for the Conservative Party.

He was born in Oslo and graduated from the University of Oslo with the cand.philol. degree in 1976. He worked as secretariat leader for the Conservative Party parliamentary caucus from 1981 to 1983, and was a political adviser to Jan P. Syse in Willoch's Second Cabinet from 1983 to 1985. He served as a deputy representative to the Parliament of Norway from Oslo during the terms 1997–2001 and 2013–2017.

In his career outside politics, Helgerud worked as director of environmental information in Norsk Hydro from 1985 to 1991, information director in Sparebanken NOR from 1991 to 1999, executive director of communications in successor companies Gjensidige NOR and DnB NOR between 1999 and 2004. From 2004 to 2014 he was the chief executive of Sparebankstiftelsen DnB NOR.

Non-profit organization positions
Preceded by position created	Chief executive of Sparebankstiftelsen DnB NOR; 2004–2014	Succeeded by André Støylen
