= Torkel Wetterhus =

Norwegian politician

Torkel Wetterhus (born 29 June 1944) is a Norwegian businessperson and politician.

A forester by education, he works as a farmer. He has been chairman of the board of Sparebanken NOR in Buskerud and of Norske Skog, and a member of the board of the DnB NOR Savings Bank Foundation, Sparebanken NOR nationwide, Gjensidige NOR, the Norwegian Agrarian Association and the Norwegian Forest Owners Association.

As a politician he is a former deputy mayor of Nore og Uvdal municipality and member of Buskerud county council. He was a member of the Conservative Party from 1971, but left the party in 2004. He later joined the Centre Party.
