= Helge Leiro Baastad =

Norwegian businessperson

Helge Leiro Baastad (born 1960) is a Norwegian businessperson.

He graduated from the Norwegian School of Economics and Business Administration with the siv.øk. degree. He was hired as a director in Gjensidige in 1998; the company became Gjensidige NOR through a merger. He became executive of insurance in the company in 2002. When DnB NOR was created via a merger in 2003, a merger which included parts of Gjensidige NOR, Baastad became a board member of the new company. He resigned in 2005. He continued as the chief executive officer of Gjensidige.

He is also the deputy chair of the Norwegian Financial Services Association and a board member of Finance Norway.

He resides in Vollen.
