= Rune Bjerke =

Norwegian politician, businessman (b. 1960)

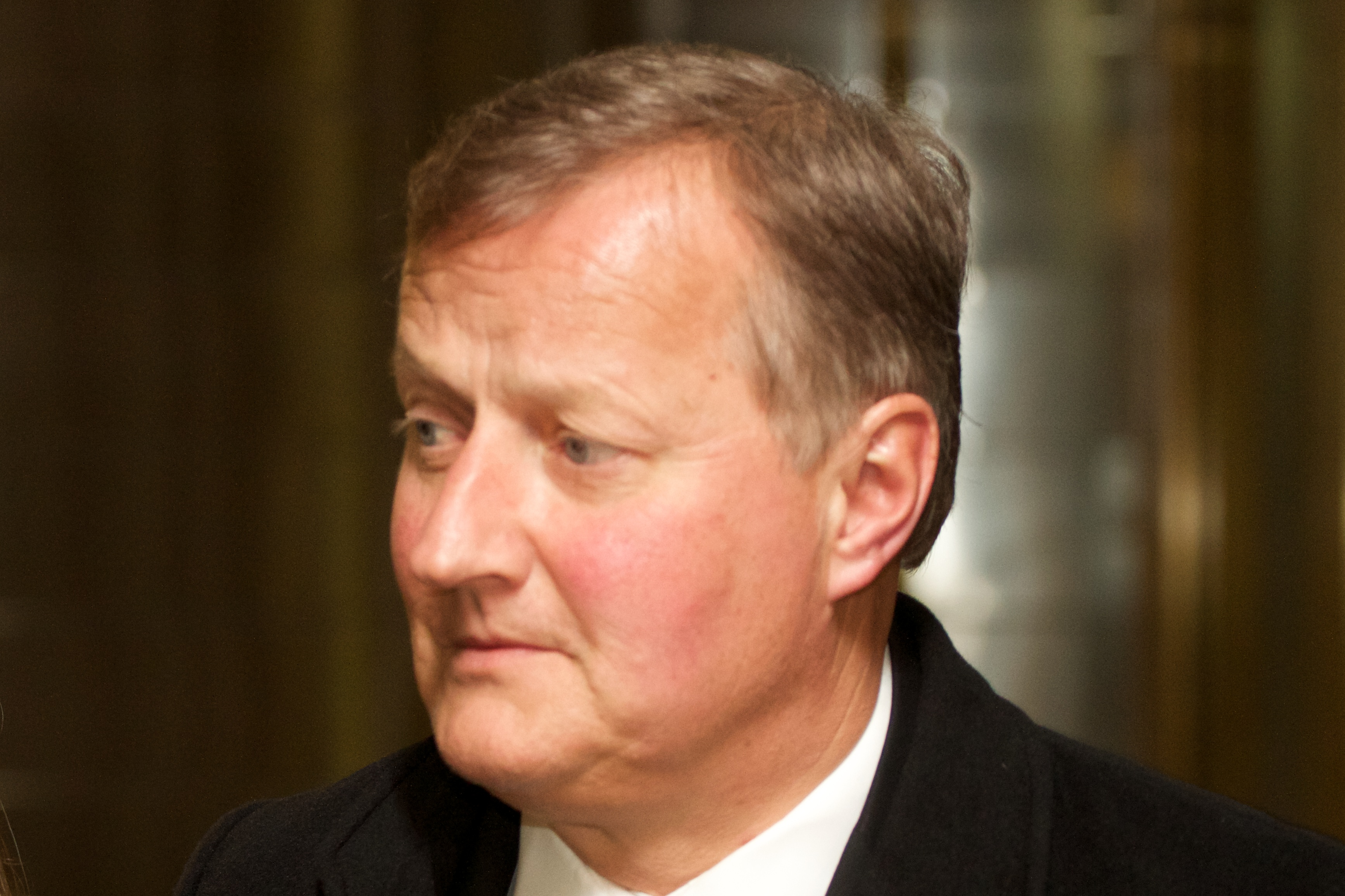

City commissioner of finance, Oslo
- In office 1992–1995

Personal details
- Born: 17 June 1960 (age 66)
- Party: Labour Party
- Spouse: Libe Rieber-Mohn
- Education: University of Oslo; Harvard University

Rune Bjerke (born 17 June 1960) is a Norwegian businessperson and politician for the Labour Party.

Rune is son of Juul Bjerke and brother of Siri Bjerke. Bjerke studied economics at the University of Oslo, and has a master's degree in public administration from Harvard University.

From 1992 to 1995 he was city commissioner (byråd) of finance in the city cabinet of Oslo. He has previously been advisor in the Norwegian Ministry of Petroleum and Energy, director in Scancem International and chief executive officer in Hafslund. From 2007 to 2019 he was chief executive officer of DNB.

He is the chairman of the board of Doorstep, and of both the Norwegian Financial Services Association and Finance Norway.

Bjerke is married to the Labour party politician Libe Rieber-Mohn.

Political offices
| Preceded by Hans Andreas Limi | Oslo City Commissioner of Finance and Planning; 1992–1995 | Succeeded by Gro Balas |
Business positions
| Preceded by Hans Tormod Hansen | Chief executive of Hafslund; 2000–2006 | Succeeded by Christian Berg |
| Preceded by Svein Aaser | Chief executive officer of DNB; 2007–2019 | Succeeded by Kjerstin Braathen |
