= Odd Schjerve =

Norwegian businessman (1933–1985)

Odd Schjerve (23 December 1933 – 24 September 1985) was a Norwegian businessperson.

He was born in Trondheim, and graduated in machine engineering from the Norwegian Institute of Technology in 1960. He remained in Trondheim as a researcher until working for Kongsberg Våpenfabrikk from 1967 to 1975. In 1975 he became regional director of Storebrand-Idun in Trondheim, and in 1977 he became marketing director. In 1979 he was the director in Norway of Storebrand-Idun. The company then merged to form Storebrand-Norden, and Schjerve became deputy chief executive. From 1983 to 1985 he was deputy chief executive of Gjensidige Liv, and upon the reorganization of Gjensidige Forsikring in 1985 he became its chief executive officer. Formerly, there had been two chief executives, one for Gjensidige Liv and one for Gjensidige Skade.

He died after less than a month in the job, on 24 September 1985 and was buried on Vestre gravlund. He was first succeeded as company leader by the senior management, consisting of four people. Helge Kvamme was later chosen as the successor.

Schjerve was also a board member of Norsk Rasjonaliseringsforbund.

Business positions
Preceded by Jan Teiler-Johnsen (Gjensidige Skade); Olaf Kolstad (Gjensidige Liv)	Chief executive officer of Gjensidige Forsikring; 1985	Succeeded by Helge Kvamme
