= Vital Forsikring =

Norwegian insurance company

Vital Forsikring ASA
- Type: Subsidiary
- Industry: Insurance
- Founded: 1990
- Headquarters: Bergen, Norway
- Area served: Norway
- Key people: Tom Rathke (CEO)
- Number of employees: 299 (2026)
- Parent: DnB NOR
- Website: www.vital.no

Vital Forsikring ASA, branded as Vital, is Norway's largest life insurance and pension insurance company, and part of the DnB NOR Group. Though Vital has roots back to 1847, it was created in its present form by a merger between Vital and Gjensidige NOR's life insurance section after the mother companies merged in 2003. Vital has its headquarters in Bergen, Norway and has total assets of 200 billion kr.

Vital also owns a large portfolio of real estate, valued about NOK 24 billion. This includes the entire portfolio of real estate owned by the entire DnB NOR group in Norway.

== History ==
Vital has its roots back to 1847 when Gjensidige was created. Gjensidige merged with Glitne (1968), Samtrygd (1985), Forenede Forsikring (1992) and Sparebanken NOR Forsikring (1999).

The brand name Vital was created in 1990 when Hygea (founded in 1884) and Norsk Kollektiv Pensjonskasse (founded in 1938) merged to found Vital. Vital was bought by Den norske Bank in 1996. In 2003, after the mother companies of Gjensidge and Vital, respectively Den norske Bank and Gjensidige NOR were merged, the two insurance companies were also merged.
