= Jan Teiler-Johnsen =

Norwegian businessman (1923–2002)

Jan Teiler-Johnsen (25 August 1923 – 17 October 2002) was a Norwegian businessperson.

He was born in Sarpsborg. After finishing his secondary education in 1943, he worked as a farmer in Skjeberg while serving in the Norwegian resistance movement. He attended the Norwegian School of Economics and Business Administration from 1945 to 1947, was then hired in the Norwegian Price Directorate where he worked one year. He then worked in different consulting firms, one of which was his own firm Økonomikonsulent. In 1961 he was hired as an executive of Samtrygd, which in 1978 changed its name to Gjensidige Norsk Skadeforsikring (Gjensidige Skade for short). He was the chief executive officer of this company from 1984 to his retirement in 1985. In 1985, Gjensidige Skade got one chief executive shared with Gjensidige Liv, as they were reorganized in Gjensidige Forsikring. After retirement he worked with consulting tasks.

Teiler-Johnsen was chairman of Interfinans, Elcon and Skipsgaranti, board member in the Association of Norwegian Insurance Companies, supervisory council chairman in Dyno and corporate council member in Idun-Nora. He died in October 2002.
