= Aarestrup =

Aarestrup (â´re-ströp) is a Danish surname. Notable people with the surname include:

- Emil Aarestrup (1800–1856), Danish physician and poet
- Gustav Aarestrup (1916–2005), Norwegian jurist and businessperson
- Marie Aarestrup (1826–1919), Norwegian genre, portrait and animal painter
- Nicolay Aarestrup (1898–1983), Norwegian businessperson
