= Poulsson =

Poulsson is a surname. Notable people with the surname include:

- Annar Poulsson (1911–1996), Norwegian businessperson in the insurance industry
- Emilie Poulsson (1853–1939), American children's author, campaigner for early childhood education
- Erik Ø. Poulsson (1904–1987), Norwegian businessperson in the insurance industry
- Jens-Anton Poulsson DSO, (1918–2010), Norwegian military officer
- Magnus Poulsson (1881–1958), Norwegian architect
