= KLP =

KLP may refer to:

- Kommunal Landspensjonskasse, Norwegian mutual insurance company
- KLP Eiendom, Norwegian real estate management company
- KLP (musician), Australian singer-songwriter, record producer, DJ and radio personality
- Kamasa language, ISO code klp
- KLP or Key Lime Pie, early name for Android KitKat
- Krishikar Lok Party, Indian political party in 1951
- KLP48
