= Helge Kvamme =

Norwegian jurist and businessman

Helge Kvamme (1938 – 5 August 1996) is a Norwegian jurist and businessperson.

He was born in Bergen. He was a jurist by education and worked as a lecturer at the University of Oslo from 1969 to 1973. He was hired in Norges Brannkasse in 1974, and in 1977 he was promoted to deputy chief executive. In 1984 the company entered the insurance group UNI Forsikring. He left the company in 1986 to work as a director in Gjensidige. He was also chair of Statoil from 1992.

He held both the director and chairman post until he died in 1996, on a business trip in Finland with Gjensidige. An obituary was published by later Prime Minister Jens Stoltenberg, who praised Kvamme's work in Statoil.

Business positions
Preceded by Odd Schjerve	Chief executive officer of Gjensidige; 1986–1996	Succeeded by Sverre Høegh Krohn (acting)
Preceded by Jan Erik Langangen	Chair of Statoil; 1992–1996	Succeeded by Arnfinn Hofstad (acting)
