= Hannevik =

Hannevik is a surname. Notable people with the surname include:

- Anna Hannevik (1925–2025), Norwegian Salvationist
- Stein Hannevik (born 1954), Norwegian banker
