= Baastad =

Baastad is a surname. Notable people with the surname include:

- Babbis Friis-Baastad (1921–1970), Norwegian children's writer
- Einar Friis Baastad (1890–1968), Norwegian football player
- Helge Leiro Baastad (born 1960), Norwegian businessperson
- Lena Rådström Baastad (born 1974), Swedish politician

== See also ==
- Friis-Baastad Peak, is one of the ice-free peaks at the south side of Frostlendet Valley, situated 1 nautical mile (2 km) southeast of the Mana Mountain in the Borg Massif of Queen Maud Land, Antarctica
