= Per Terje Vold =

Norwegian civil servant and businessman (1945–2025)

Per Terje Vold ( 6 April 1945 - 30 July 2025) was a Norwegian civil servant and businessperson.

He grew up at the Engan farm in Røros Municipality, and attended school both at Røros and at Orkdal. He studied science at the University of Oslo and economics at the Norwegian School of Economics and Business Administration in Bergen, Norway, and started his career in the oil section of the Norwegian Ministry of Industry. He then worked in the Organisation for Economic Co-operation and Development (OECD) in Paris. He was Chief Executive Officer (CEO) in Storebrand from 1992 to 1994.

After Storebrand he worked in Statoil. He was also a board member of DnB NOR and Oslo Jazzfestival. In 1998 he became the new director of the Federation of Norwegian Process Industries, a position he left in 2004. He was succeeded by Stein Lier-Hansen. Vold was then director of the Norwegian Oil Industry Association from 2004 to 2010. He was succeeded by Gro Brækken on 1 January 2010.

Business positions
Preceded by Jan Erik Langangen	Chief executive officer of UNI Storebrand; 1992–1994	Succeeded by Åge Korsvold
