= Dag Tjernsmo =

Norwegian banker (born 1962)

Dag Tjernsmo (born 1962) is a Norwegian banker.

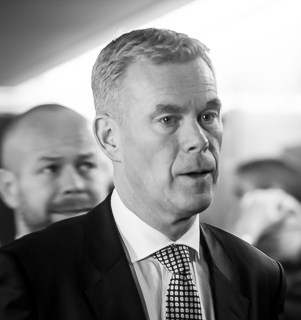
Dag Tjernsmo

In the Swedish bank conglomerate Handelsbanken he is an executive vice president as well as head of its regional bank in Norway. He has also led the stock fund company Xact Fonder. He is a board member of the Norwegian Financial Services Association and Finance Norway.
