= Doorstep (company) =

Norwegian online marketplace company

Doorstep is an online brokerage firm based in Norway.

It was established in 2000, and was meant to develop a web portal for online trade. It was a cooperation between telecommunications company Telenor and Den norske Bank. Chairman was Petter Jansen, and among the board members were Gunn Wærsted, Jon Fredrik Baksaas and Ingvild Myhre. The goal was to create the largest market place of its kind in Norway. However the chief executive officer Knut Oppegaard quit in March 2001 and was replaced by Ann-Kristin Hageløkken. The portal had not yet been opened. The plans were then significantly altered in April 2001, as the plans for online trading were cut. It shared its fate with several dot-com companies, although the company would use the .no top-level domain instead of .com.

The company still exists, with the purpose of "business development". Jon Fredrik Baksaas is a member of the board, which is now chaired by Rune Bjerke.
