= Savings banks in Norway =

Type of Norwegian savings bank

Sparebank is a type of Norwegian savings bank without external owners. The Norwegian sparebanks are a separate type of juridical entity that differ from commercial banks and are more similar to cooperative banks. As of 2022, there were a total of 123 savings banks in Norway.

== History ==
The first savings bank was created in 1822, and in the following 75 years savings banks were set up in most municipalities of Norway. The banks had both a savings upbringing function for the commoners (so they did not have to burden society when they got sick and old) and served an important part in local communities development and self-financing.

Historically the savings banks concentrated on private customers, combined with small businesses and the primary sector. Loans were financed through deposits. Today the differences between savings banks and commercial banks are smaller, partially because savings banks now can issue stock-like grunnfondsbevis where the owners are entitled to both dividends and representation in the governing bodies of the banks. The savings banks can now also convert themselves to public limited companies, but so far only one bank, Gjensidige NOR, has done so. Part of this later merged to form DnB NOR while the rest of it returned to the savings bank form, becoming Gjensidige.

Traditionally the savings banks have had a strong local foundation, and a goal for the municipalities was often to have their own savings bank. After World War II there were about 600 savings banks in Norway. However from the 1960s and for about the next 25 years, there were many mergers among savings banks. This was partly because of municipal mergers, but primarily because banking came to demand broader and deeper competence, and because the savings banks needed to be bigger to capture larger customers. Today there are 123 savings banks, of which some are large, regional savings banks. In parallel, there has been cooperation in Information Technology and product development, and many of the savings banks have joined one of two alliances: Sparebank 1 and Terra-Gruppen. Since most of the small commercial banks have been merged or bought by the large Nordic finance groups (DNB, Nordea, Danske Bank, etc.) the savings banks remain as the last element of decentralised banking in Norway. All savings banks are members of the Norwegian Savings Banks Association.

== See also ==
- Mutual savings bank
- Cooperative bank
- Banking in Norway
