= Harald Sommerfeldt =

Norwegian businessperson

Harald Sommerfeldt (20 October 1886 – 1966) was a Norwegian businessperson.

Harald Sommerfeldt, ca 1960

He was born in Kristiania as a son of customs treasurer Thorolf Sommerfeldt (1849–1909) and Thrine Karine Sommerfelt (1856–1900). In 1912 he married Sigrid Grøner, a daughter of district stipendiary magistrate J. C. Grøner.

He finished his secondary education in 1905, and graduated in engineering from Kristiania Technical School in 1909. He was an engineer at Kværner Brug from 1909 to 1912, then in the insurance company Forsikringsaktieselskapet Norden. He was promoted to assisting director in 1932 and chief executive officer in 1934. He retired in 1958. He also chaired the Association of Norwegian Insurance Companies from 1941 to 1952 and Den norske Brandtarifforening from 1936 to 1957. He chaired the supervisory council of De-No-Fa, Lilleborg Fabriker and Norske Liv and was deputy chair in the supervisory council of Saugbrugsforeningen.

He was decorated as a Knight, First Class of the Order of St. Olav, Knight of the Order of the Dannebrog, Commander of the Order of Vasa and the Order of the Lion of Finland. He died in 1966.

Business positions
Preceded by L. S. Karlsen	Chief executive of Forsikringsselskapet Norden; 1934–1958	Succeeded by Erik Ø. Poulsson
