= Anne Carine Tanum =

Norwegian business executive (born 1954)

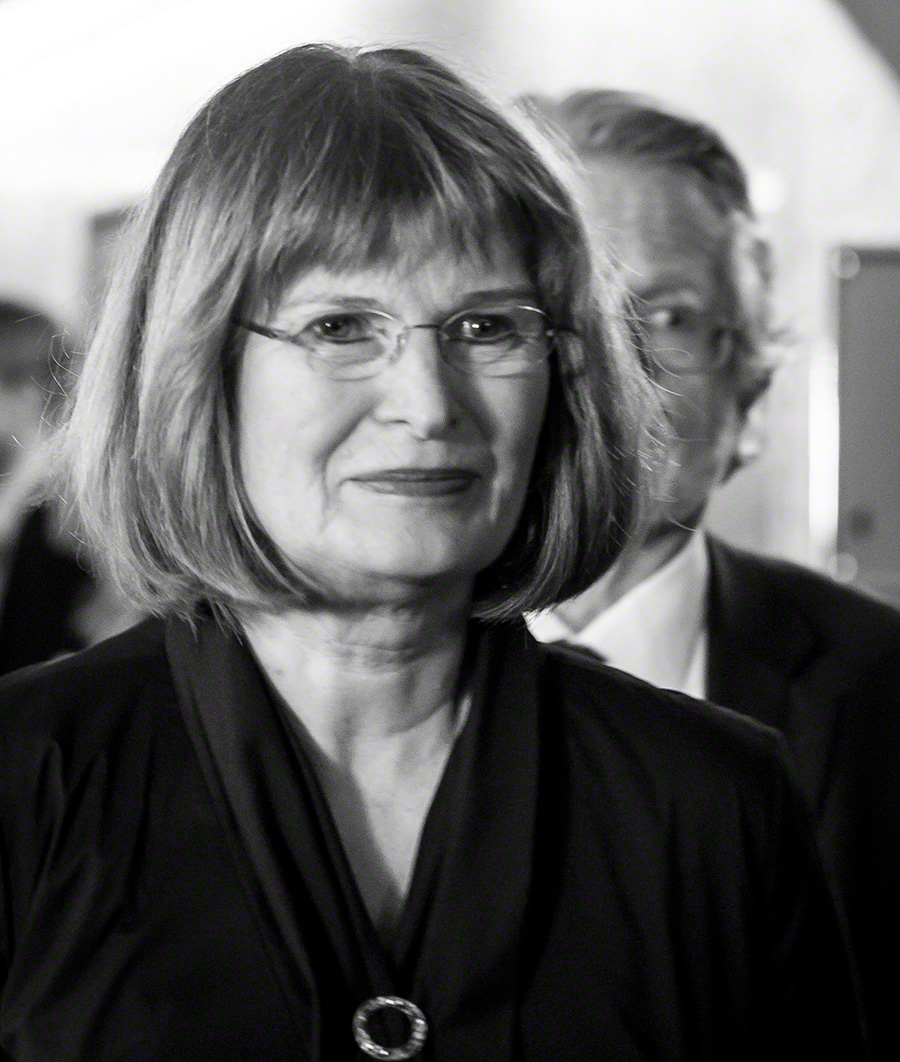
- Tanum at the central bank chiefs speech in 2016.
- Born: 27 November 1954 (age 71); Oslo, Norway
- Occupation: Business executive

Anne Carine Tanum (born 27 November 1954) is a Norwegian business executive. She is the former owner and managing director of the Tanum chain of bookstores in the Oslo area which was sold to Egmont in 2006. The current chair of DNB and Litteraturhuset (Oslo's House of Literature), in May 2015 she was appointed chair of the board of directors of the Norwegian Opera.

Earlier responsibilities have included board chairman of the Norwegian Broadcasting Corporation and director of the Vital Forsikring life insurance company. As of September 2015, she is a director of Europris, Kilden, E-Co Energi Holding, E-CO Energi, Oslo Universitetssykehus, Henie Onstad Kunstsenter, Cappelen Damm Holding, Ancata and the International Research Institute of Stavanger.

Anne Carine Tanum is the granddaughter of Johan Grundt Tanum (1891–1978), an important figure in the Norwegian publishing sphere. She holds a law degree from the University of Oslo. In 2011, she was named Norway's Female Chair of the Year for her skills in the boardroom at DnB (Den Norske Bank).
