= Norwegian Financial Services Association =

Employers' organisation in Norway

Logo.

The Norwegian Financial Services Association (Norwegian: Finansnæringens Hovedorganisasjon) is an employers' organisation in Norway.

It was established in 2000 as a merger between the Norwegian Bankers' Association and the Association of Norwegian Insurance Companies. In 2010 it founded the cooperation organization Finance Norway together with the Norwegian Savings Banks Association. Both organizations still exist, but not their respective "service offices", whose tasks were taken over by Finance Norway. The headquarters are in Oslo.

The board currently consists of Rune Bjerke (leader), Helge Leiro Baastad (deputy chair), Kirsten Idebøen, Idar Kreutzer, Kjerstin Fyllingen, Line M. Hestvik, Stein Ole Larsen, Sverre Thornes, Gunn Wærsted, Dag Tjernsmo and Trond F. Mellingsæter.
