= Tom Ruud (businessman) =

Norwegian businessman and banker (born 1950)

Tom Ruud (born 1 October 1950) is a Norwegian businessman and banker.

He graduated from the Norwegian Institute of Technology in 1974 with the siv.ing. degree. After serving as a consultant in International Business Machines, he was hired in the bank Den norske Creditbank in 1984. Following his tenure as an executive in the Aker system, he assumed the role as CEO of the bank Kreditkassen in 1997. The bank then became a part of the multinational company Nordea. From 2001, he was Nordea's country senior executive in Norway and the corporation's leader of "Banking & Capital Market Products". In 2008 he left Nordea, whose leadership has an upper age limit of 60. Subsequently, he was appointed as a director in Umoe.

He is the chair of Umoe Bioenergy and leader of the corporate council and electoral committee in Norske Skog. He was the chair of the Orkla Group from 2001 to 2002.

Business positions
Preceded by position created	Country senior executive of Nordea in Norway; 2001–2008	Succeeded by Gunn Wærsted
Preceded by Finn Hvistendahl	Chair of the Orkla Group; 2001–2002	Succeeded by Johan Fredrik Odfjell
