= Jæger Dokk =

Norwegian insurance leader

- Born: 12 September 1921; Aker, Norway
- Died: 17 June 2000 (aged 78)
- Occupation: Insurance manager
- Awards: Order of St. Olav (1985)

Jæger Dokk (12 December 1921 – 17 June 2000) was a Norwegian insurance leader. He was born in Aker. He was CEO of the insurance company Samtrygd/Gjensidige from 1958 to 1984. He was decorated Knight, First Class of the Order of St. Olav in 1985.

Dokk died on 17 June 2000, at the age of 78.
