= Erik Ø. Poulsson =

Erik Østerdahl Poulsson (26 February 1904 – 4 February 1987) was a Norwegian businessperson in the insurance industry.

== Biography ==
He was born in Kristiania as a son of manager Lauritz Østerdahl Poulsson (1869–1915) and Martha Jakobine Poulsson (1873–1969). In 1938 he married Vibeke Poulsson, a daughter of director Einar Poulsson (1884–1948). He was a brother-in-law of insurance director Annar Poulsson.

He finished his secondary education in 1922, and graduated from the Royal Frederick University in 1927 with a cand.jur. degree. He worked as an attorney before serving as deputy judge from 1930 to 1931, secretary in the Ministry of Finance from 1931 to 1933 and secretary for the chief financial officer of Oslo Municipality from 1933 to 1937.

He was hired as a secretary in the Association of Norwegian Insurance Companies in 1937, and advanced to chief executive, which he was from 1945 to 1957. Since 1951 he doubled as chief executive of the employers' association Skadeforsikringsselskapenes arbeidsgiverforening. In 1957 he was hired as assisting director in Forsikringsselskapet Norden, later working as chief executive from 1958 to 1971. From 1964 to 1971 he doubled as chief executive of Det Norske Brandforsikringsselskap Fram. In 1971, Norden formed the group Nordengruppen together with Sigyn and Norske Alliance, with a common board of directors.

Poulsson chaired the board of Skadeforsikringsselskapenes arbeidsgiverforening from 1958 to 1972, chaired Norsk Atomforsikringspool from 1970 to 1972 (having been board member since 1957 and deputy chair since 1961) and Norsk Flyforsikringspool from 1960 to 1972. He was a supervisory council member of Den norske Creditbank and Saugbrugsforeningen. He also represented Norway in the Comité Européen des Assurances and in an OECD research committee.

He died in 1987 and was buried at Vestre gravlund.

Business positions
Preceded by	Chief executive of Association of Norwegian Insurance Companies; 1945–1957	Succeeded by
Preceded by Harald Sommerfeldt	Chief executive of Forsikringsselskapet Norden; 1958–1971	Succeeded by
