= Jan Erik Langangen =

Norwegian businessperson and lawyer (born 1950)

Jan Erik Langangen (born 11 May 1950) is a Norwegian businessperson and lawyer.

He was born in Porsgrunn as a son of Sigurd Langangen (1918–1973) and Lilly Auen (1919–1990). He graduated with the siv.øk. degree from the Norwegian School of Economics and Business Administration in 1973, and then took the cand.jur. degree at the University of Oslo in 1975. He was hired in the same year as a consultant in Statoil, and headed the economy and finance department from 1979. He remained here until 1983. He was then the deputy chief executive of Storebrand-Norden from 1983, and advanced to chief executive officer in 1985. From 1986 to 1988 he chaired the Association of Norwegian Insurance Companies. His company merged with UNI in 1991, creating UNI Storebrand.

After the Skandia raid in 1991–1992, when UNI Storebrand bought shares in Skandia without acquiring control over the company, and the shares later plummeted, Langangen was forced to leave Storebrand. He had also been the chair of Statoil from 1987, but left Statoil as well. In Statoil he had, together with the board, fired the chief executive Arve Johnsen following the Mongstad scandal.

Langangen left the insurance business and became a junior solicitor in the law firm Thune & Co. He was promoted to partner before starting his own law firm Langangen & Engesæth in 1996, and then Langangen & Helset together with his second wife in 2000. He has later had an engagement in Nordic American Tankers. He has been the chair of Norwegian Broker and Södertuna Konferensslott AB, and board member of Knut Axel Ugland Holding. He has been a minor owner in NorAgra, a company that invested in Lithuanian agriculture. He has also been an owner in Airlift and Helilift. From 1998 to 2001 Langangen headed the Norwegian Values Commission. He had become a Christian and stated that his time as a business executive was a "wrong course". He resides in Langangen on a family farm.

Business positions
Preceded by Jannik Lindbæk	Chief executive officer of UNI Storebrand; 1985–1992	Succeeded by Per Terje Vold
Preceded by Inge Johansen	Chair of Statoil; 1987–1992	Succeeded by Helge Kvamme
