= Helgerud =

Helgerud is a Norwegian surname. Notable people with the surname include:

- Albert Helgerud (1876–1954), Norwegian rifle shooter
- Cato Helgerud (1921–1997), Norwegian bandy player
- Frode Helgerud (born 1950), Norwegian businessman and politician
