= Sparebankstiftinga Sogn og Fjordane =

Sparebankstiftinga Sogn og Fjordane is a Norwegian banking foundation that was set up as the owner of regional savings bank, Sparebanken Sogn og Fjordane.

It is the largest foundation in the western part of Norway, and the second largest in Norway after Sparebankstiftelsen DnB. It was founded in 2010 and is the main owner of Sparebanken Sogn og Fjordane (94.12%) together with Sparebankstiftinga Fjaler which owns (5.88%) of the bank.

The purpose of the foundation is to be a stable and long term owner of Sparebanken Sogn og Fjordane, to sustain the savings bank heritage and to distribute gifts to charitable purposes in the county of Sogn og Fjordane.
