= Tor Tank-Nielsen =

Norwegian businessman

Tor Tank-Nielsen (9 July 1918 – 8 March 2010) was a Norwegian businessperson.

He was born in Kristiania. He studied chemical engineering and graduated in 1940. In 1941 he was hired in the company M. Peterson & Søn, and after a series of promotions he became CEO in 1981.

He is one of two honorary members in the Industrial Association of the city of Moss, the other one being Erik Mollatt.
