= Per Mørch Hansson =

Norwegian sportsman and businessman

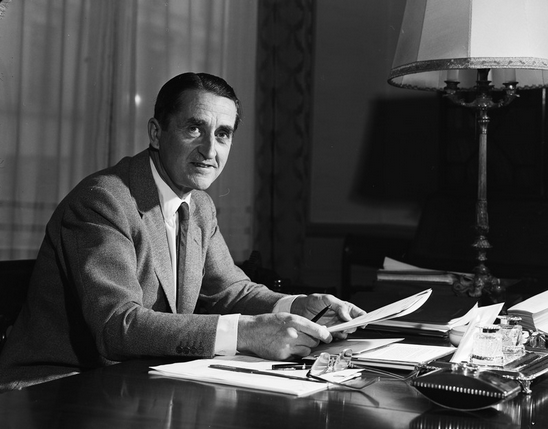
- Per M. Hansson pictured in 1961 by Leif Ørnelund
- Born: 4 March 1905; Aker, Norway
- Died: 6 October 1994 (aged 89)
- Occupation(s): Sportsperson (tennis, ski jumping, sailing); Business executive
- Employer: Storebrand

Per Mørch Hansson (4 March 1905 – 6 October 1994) was a Norwegian sportsman who competed in tennis, ski jumping and sailing, and businessperson.

== Biography ==
He was born in Aker. He graduated with a cand.jur. degree in 1926. From 1940 he was the chief executive officer of the insurance company Storebrand. He was chairman of the board of Det Norske Luftfartsselskap, and board member of various companies, including Den norske Creditbank, Saugbrugsforeningen, Elektrokemisk and Sulitjelma Gruber. He was decorated Commander of the Order of St. Olav in 1965.

He represented IF Ready and won the national championship in tennis men's double 1931, 1932 and 1933 with Ragnar Hagen.

Business positions
Preceded by Christian Hansson (his father)	Chief executive officer of Storebrand; 1940–1965	Succeeded by Gustav Aarestrup
Preceded by Per Mørch Hansson	Chair of Storebrand; 1965–1976	Succeeded by Gustav Aarestrup
