= Hvistendahl =

Hvistendahl is a surname. Notable people with the surname include:

- Finn Hvistendahl (born 1942), Norwegian businessman
- Mara Hvistendahl, American writer
