= FNO =

FNO may refer to:

- Finance Norway
- Santa Fe Passenger Depot (Fresno, California), Amtrak code FNO
- Nitrosyl fluoride
- Friday Night Ops
