= Fredrik Meyer =

Norwegian sailor

Olympic medal record

Sailing
Silver medal – second place	1936 Berlin	6 metre class

Fredrik Meyer (13 February 1916 – 16 January 1989) was a Norwegian sailor who competed in the 1936 Summer Olympics, and an officer in the Royal Norwegian Air Force.

In 1936 he won the silver medal as crew member of the Norwegian boat Lully II in the 6 metre class event.

During World War II he escaped to Little Norway in Canada, where he received flight training. He served for the rest of the war as a pilot with the Norwegian 330 Squadron.

After the war, he served as aide-de-camp to King Haakon VII from 1952 to 1954. From 1955 onwards he was a secretary in the Order of St. Olav and from 1971 to 1978 head of the order's secretariat.

Meyer is the author of Hærens og Marinens flyvåpen 1912-1945, published in 1973, and he covered sailing for Aftenposten for many years.

== Sources ==
- Hvem er hvem? 1973
