= Jannik Lindbæk =

Norwegian banker and businessperson (born 1939)

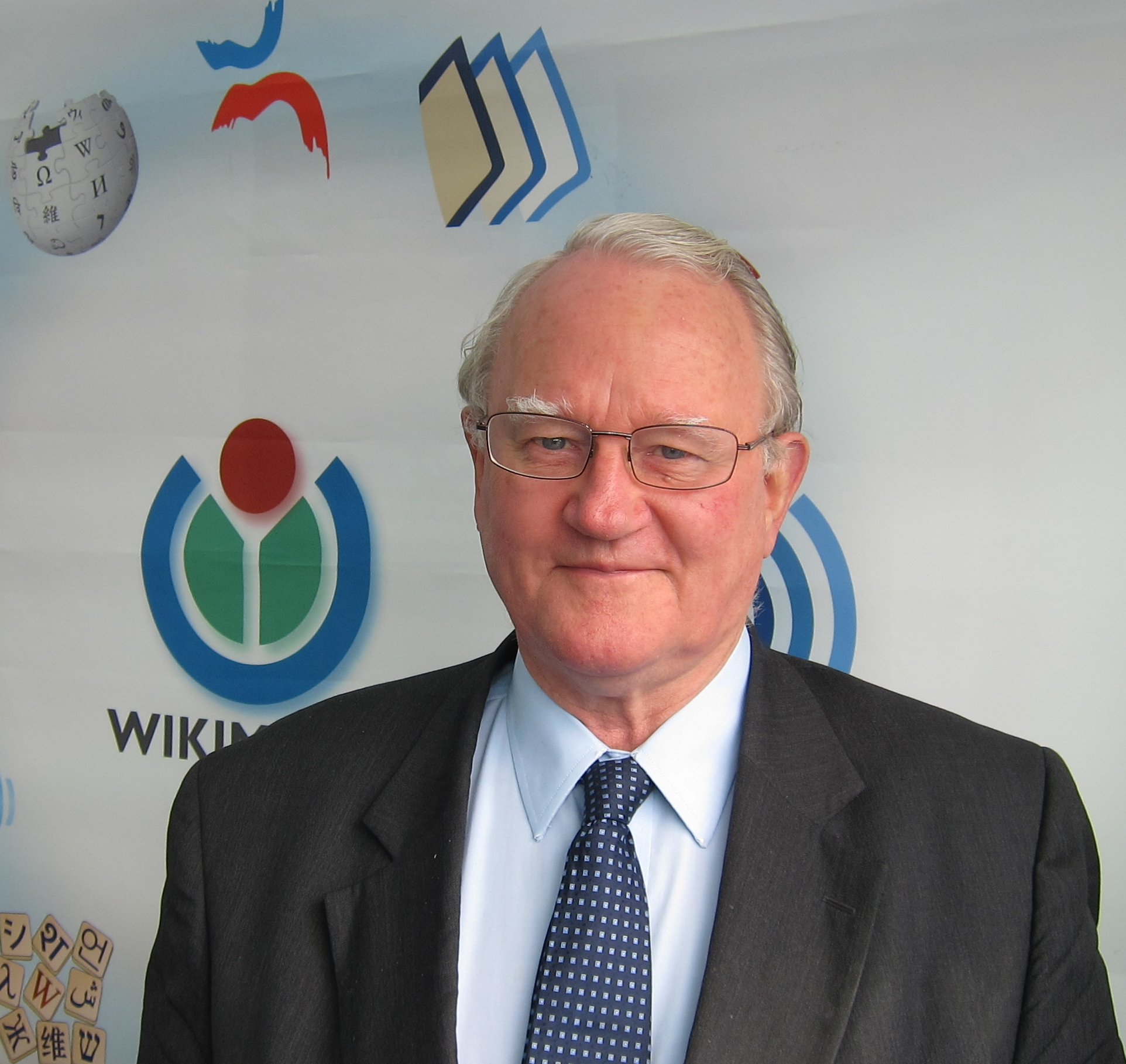
Jannik Lindbæk, photo taken during a visit he did to the Wikimedia Norway booth at Oslo bokfestival (Oslo book fair), September 2011

Jannik Lindbæk (born 23 March 1939) is a Norwegian banker and businessperson.

== Personal life ==
He was born in Oslo as a son of banker Jannik Lindbæk Sr. (1906–1966) and chief physician Ellen Margrethe Lund. His aunt was journalist and war correspondent Lise Lindbæk, and he was a great-grandson of Elise Aubert In December 1963 he married teacher Grete Schjøttelvig.

== Career ==
Lindbæk finished his secondary education in Oslo and earned a siv.øk. degree from the Norwegian School of Economics in 1961. He later received a Fulbright scholarship to continue his business studies for one year at the University of Kansas. In 1962 he was hired in Vesta, where his father also worked. He quickly advanced through the ranks and became vice chief executive. In 1975 he was hired as chief executive officer in Storebrand, later Storebrand-Norden. Lindbæk's predecessor and later chairman, Gustav Aarestrup, was pressured out of the company in 1982, and Lindbæk resigned for unclear reasons in 1985.

Lindbæk became head of the Nordic Investment Bank in Finland in 1986, overseeing hundreds of millions in loans to develop the economies of the five countries that own the bank: Denmark, Finland, Iceland, Norway, and Sweden. He was executive vice president of the International Finance Corporation in Washington, DC from 1994 to 1999.

He then returned to Norway in order to work with different boards of directors. He chaired Den norske Bank from 1999 to 2003, and was the last chair of Statoil until 2007 when it merged to create StatoilHydro. He also chaired Bergen International Festival, the Norwegian branch of Transparency International and the Norwegian branch of Plan International.

Business positions
Preceded by Gustav Aarestrup	Chief executive officer of Storebrand-Norden (Storebrand until 1982); 1975–1985	Succeeded by Jan Erik Langangen
Preceded by Gerhard Heiberg	Chair of Den norske Bank; 1999–2003	Succeeded by Olav Hytta
Preceded by Leif Terje Løddesøl	Chair of Statoil; 2003–2007	Succeeded by Eivind Reiten (in StatoilHydro)
