= Sverre Thornes =

Norwegian businessperson (born 1960)

Sverre Thornes (born 2 November 1960) is a Norwegian businessperson.

He was hired in Kommunal Landspensjonskasse to work with portfolios in 1995, and led the daughter company KLP Kapitalforvaltning from 2001 to 2006. He led the Kommunal Landspensjonskasse life insurance branch until 3 January 2008, when he became CEO of Kommunal Landspensjonskasse. He is also a board member of the Norwegian Financial Services Association and Finance Norway.

He resides in Oslo.
