= Hytta =

Hytta is a Norwegian surname. Notable people with the surname include:

- Anne Hytta (born 1974), Norwegian Hardingfele musician
- Olav Hytta (born 1943), Norwegian businessperson
