= Sparebankstiftelsen DNB =

Norwegian foundation supporting art and culture

- Type: Foundation
- Industry: Holding company
- Founded: 2002
- Headquarters: Oslo, Norway
- Area served: Norway
- Key people: Egil Matsen (CEO)
- Number of employees: 5 (2006)
- Website: www.sparebankstiftelsen.no

Sparebankstiftelsen DNB (transl. Savings Bank Foundation DNB) is a Norwegian foundation. The foundation gives financial contributions to a wide range of charitable causes, and is the second largest shareholder of the financial services company DNB. The foundation's capital is a result of accumulated profits from the former savings banks which are now part of DNB.

== History ==
The foundation was created when the two savings banks Sparebanken NOR (bank) and Gjensidige (insurance) merged to form Gjensidige NOR and in 2002 became a public limited company and listed on Oslo Stock Exchange. The foundation was created to own part of the company to continue the tradition of customers of savings banks owning part of the bank. When Gjensidige NOR merged with Den norske Bank in 2003 to form DnB NOR, the company retained an ownership in the newly created company.

== Cultural initiatives ==
In addition to giving direct financial contributions, the Savings Bank Foundation invests in causes that benefit the general public. In 2005, they founded the instrument fund, Dextra Musica, with the aim to promote classical music. The fund owns a valuable collection of string instruments which have been placed at the disposal of Norwegian musicians.

The foundation has made funds available to Norwegian museums to assist in art acquisitions. Since 1999, the foundation has spent €400 million on acquiring art. In 2019, the foundation purchased Ernst Kirchner's 1915 painting Das Soldatenbad (English: The Artillerymen) for US$22 million for the collection of the National Gallery of Oslo. The foundation also funds various fine art initiatives, including museum exhibitions.

In 2016, the foundation opened Sentralen, a house for the performing arts and a gathering place for social and cultural innovation in the centre of Oslo. The building originally served as the headquarters for Christiania Sparebank, which was the predecessor of the Savings Bank Foundation DNB. Sentralen contains several stages and production spaces as well as a restaurant and café.

== See also ==
- List of wealthiest foundations
