= Kirsten Idebøen =

Norwegian banker (1963–2015)

- Died: 20 May 2015

Kirsten Idebøen (26 February 1963 – 20 May 2015) was a Norwegian banker.

She held an MBA in finance from the George Washington University.

In July 2000, she became the CEO of the Halogen Norway, a strategic Internet solutions company.

Kirsten Idebøen became the chief financial officer of the group SpareBank 1 in 2002, and chief executive officer from 28 January 2009 to 1 April 2015.

She was also a board member of Finansbanken, Berner Gruppen, the Norwegian Financial Services Association, Elkem, Schibsted, A-pressen and Budstikka Media.

On 1 April 2015, she resigned from the position of CEO of the SpareBank 1 Group. On 30 April 2015, the shareholders approved her appointment as Director of the board of the reinsurance company SCOR SE.

Kirsten Idebøen died on 20 May 2015 at the age of 52.

== Personal life ==
Kirsten Idebøen was married to Knut Idebøen. They had two sons. One died in 2014, a few months before his mother.
