= Kjerstin Braathen =

Norwegian banker and CEO

Kjerstin Elisabeth Rasmussen Braathen

CEO of DNB ASA
- Incumbent
- Assumed office 2019
- Preceded by: Rune Bjerke

Personal details
- Born: 1970 (age 55–56) Lillestrøm
- Spouse: Henning Braathen
- Education: École supérieure de commerce
- Occupation: Banking
- Profession: Finance

Kjerstin Elisabeth Rasmussen Braathen (born 1970) is a Norwegian business executive who is active in the banking and financial sectors. Since September 2019, she has been CEO of DNB ASA, Norway's largest financial services group. A graduate at the École supérieure de commerce in Nice, after four years with Hydro Agri, she joined DNB in 1999.

== Biography ==
Born in 1970, Kjerstin Elisabeth Rasmussen was brought up in Lillestrøm where her parents ran a clothes shop called "Rasmussen på Torget". She helped run the establishment as she grew up, learning much about the economic aspects of businesses. Together with her husband Henning Braathen, she has three children.

She chose to study in France because she enjoyed the French language. While studying in Nice, she met many people from different cultures and this broadened her views. She earned a master's degree in Management and Finance from the École supérieure de commerce in Nice in 1995. On graduating, she held various positions in Norsk Hydro before joining DNB where she was initially involved with shipping, offshore and logistics. She subsequently served as DNB's Group Executive Vice President of Corporate Banking.

Braathen is a strong proponent of equality between men and women in business. Her tenure at DNB has nevertheless been more difficult than she expected, although she is herself a prime example of a female chief executive of a listed company in Norway. She has explained that it is important to pick the right people for management positions, avoiding the needs of diversity to employ the wrong people.
