= Finn Hvistendahl =

Norwegian businessperson (born 1942)

Finn Arild Hvistendahl (born 12 February 1942) is a Norwegian businessperson.

He graduated as siv.ing. in 1964, and worked in Norsk Hydro from 1966 to 1968, in Dyno Industrier from 1968 to 1971 and again in Norsk Hydro from 1971 to 1991. He was then CEO of Den norske Bank from 1991 to 1998. He was chairman of the board of Orkla from 2000 to 2001 and the Financial Supervisory Authority of Norway from 2002. He was sacked in Den norske Bank, and received a golden parachute of 10,800,000 kr.

He is a fellow of the Norwegian Academy of Technological Sciences.

Business positions
Preceded by Egil Gade Greve	Chief executive officer of Den norske Bank; 1991–1998	Succeeded by Svein Aaser
Preceded by Åge Korsvold	Chair of the Orkla Group; 2000–2001	Succeeded by Tom Ruud
