= Gustav Aarestrup =

Norwegian jurist and businessperson

- Born: Gustav Nicolay Aarestrup; January 1, 1916; Steinkjer, Norway
- Died: November 15, 2005 (aged 89)
- Education: Oslo Commerce School
- Spouse: Ingrid Christie Krohn
- Parents: Joachim Homboe Aarestrup (father); Anna Sophie Wiig (mother)

Gustav Nicolay Aarestrup (1 January 1916 – 15 November 2005) was a Norwegian jurist and businessperson. He was both chief executive officer and chair of Storebrand.

== Early life and World War II ==
He was born in Steinkjer as a son of vicar Joachim Homboe Aarestrup (1866–1940) and his wife Anna Sophie Wiig (1872–1944). The family moved to Sagene two years later.

He finished his secondary education in 1933, took Oslo Commerce School in 1934 and took the cand.jur. degree in 1938. He worked as a junior solicitor in Mysen until 1940, then briefly as a police officer in Oslo before being deputy judge in Farsund from 1940 to 1941. In July 1941, one year after the German invasion and occupation of Norway, Aarestrup was arrested for an attempt to flee the country. He was first imprisoned in Kristiansand's Arkivet, and later sat in Møllergata 19 from 8 to 22 August and in Grini concentration camp until mid-October 1941.

In 1942 he left Farsund, being hired in the insurance company Storebrand. After a year as a secretary for the American finance attaché in Sweden in 1944 and for the Ministry of Foreign Affairs-in exile in London from 1944 to 1945, he returned to Norway where he became foreign superintendent in Storebrand. Also, in 1943 he had married Ingrid Christie Krohn, daughter of professor Ivar Trygve Krohn and Ellen Christie.

== Later career ==
He rose in the hierarchy, via board secretary from 1948, assisting director from 1954 and vice president from 1957 to 1961. He was the chief executive officer from 1965 to 1976. He then chaired the board until his retirement in 1982. In both 1965 and 1976 he succeeded Per M. Hansson. During his time as chief executive of Storebrand, he was also the chief executive of Custos, Europeiske, Hypotekforsikringsselskapet, Kreditt-Atlas and Oslo Assuranceselskap. In 1970 he also took over for Hansson as chief executive of Norrøna. From 1971 to 1974 Aarestrup chaired the Association of Norwegian Insurance Companies.

In the mid-1980s Aarestrup was a proponent for a road tunnel to lead the European route E18 away from the city core of Oslo, specifically the square Rådhusplassen. Since the tunnel would be built under the Oslofjord, the project was called Vannlinjen. In 1984 Aarestrup became a founding board chairman of the company of the same name. Board members were Ole S. Gilbo, Ragnar Hurum, Johan B. Holte, Olav Selvaag, Erling Storrusten and Jan Bille. As it turned out, the Festning Tunnel project, proposed by the company Fjellinjen, prevailed. In 1986, when the tides were turning for Fjellinjen, Aarestrup referred to the project as a "misère from beginning to end".

He was also a board member of Norske Fortuna, Livsforsikringsselskapet Idun, Equipment Leasing Company, Skips A/S Myken, A/S Fidelio, Victor Jenssens Rederi, Waages Tankrederi, Waages Tankrederi II, Forsikringsselskapet Viking, and until 1985 in Elektrisk Bureau. He chaired the supervisory council of A/S Rosshavet, A/S Vestfold, Rederi A/S Ruth, Norges Skibshypotekforening and Andresens Bank, and was a supervisory council member of Autotransport. From 1976 to 1979 he chaired the Norwegian branch of World Wildlife Fund. In politics he was a member of the so-called "economic committee" of the Conservative Party of Norway, which was responsible for collecting party funds. Fellow members were Bjørn Bettum (chair), Johan H. Andresen, Per Chr. Frich, Aase Gudding and Per Strøm.

Business positions
Preceded by Per Mørch Hansson	Chief executive officer of Storebrand; 1965–1976	Succeeded by Jannik Lindbæk
Preceded by Per Mørch Hansson	Chair of Storebrand; 1976–1982	Succeeded by
Preceded by	Chair of Association of Norwegian Insurance Companies; 1971–1974	Succeeded by
