= Fellesbanken =

Norwegian bank

Fellesbanken A/S
- Industry: Banking
- Founded: 1920
- Defunct: 1985
- Fate: Merged
- Successor: Sparebanken Oslo/Akershus
- Headquarters: Oslo, Norway
- Number of employees: 661 (1977)
- Parent: Norwegian savings banks

Fellesbanken was a Norwegian bank that existed between 1920 and 1985 with offices in Oslo, Norway. It was created as a central bank for the Norwegian savings banks as well as functioning as a commercial bank. It merged with Sparebanken Oslo/Akershus in 1985 to form Sparebanken ABC. It is now part of DnB NOR.

== History ==
Fellesbanken was created with two functions. First of all it was to function as a central bank for the savings banks of Norway. Originally, the savings banks of Norway were all independent banks without branches, though they still had a need for central banking functions.

It was not until after World War II that it became normal for savings banks to merge and the need for such a central bank depleted. Fellesbanken was also a commercial bank, and allowed the savings banks to have such a bank. Commercial banks had certain privileges that savings banks didn't, especially within the business sector. These privileges disappeared, and by the time of their merger they were non-existent.

In the 1970s Fellesbanken established branches in Bergen, Bodø, Kristiansand, Sarpsborg, Tromsø, Trondheim and Vadsø. After the establishment of regional savings banks Fellesbanken became redundant and a competitor, and in the 1980s the bank was made a savings bank. In 1985, it merged with Sparebanken Oslo/Akershus.
