= Nevi (company) =

Norwegian financial company

Nevi was a Bergen, Norway-based financial company. Owned by Vital, it experienced a rapid growth during the 1980s, before nearly going bankrupt and being taken over by Bergen Bank in 1988.

The company experienced a boom starting in 1980, when it had total assets of 1.4 billion Norwegian krone (NOK). By 1982 it had reached NOK 3.5 billion, by 1984 NOK 8.5 billion, and peaked at NOK 15.9 billion in 1986. The company established itself in Denmark in 1982 and bought Staten Bank Holland in 1984. The following year it established the subsidiary Sleipnir UK and bought the British Baltic PLC, and bought the Danish stock broker firm Erik Møller Eftf. After profits from 1980 through 1985, the company started having losses in 1986. In 1987 the company lost large sums in the bankruptcy of VIP Scandinavia, then the company closed its operations in Britain and the Netherlands. That year the company had a loss of NOK 597.6 million.

In 1988, it was Scandinavia's largest financing company with operations in Norway, Sweden, Denmark, Iceland and the Netherlands. It had a total assets of NOK 14 billion, half of which was short-term loans in the money market. To pay for the defaults, Vesta lent Nevi NOK 960 million in 1987 and 1988. This caused Vesta to stand at the verge of bankruptcy and to secure sufficient liquidity had to sell Nevi. Nevi was thus bought by the largest creditor, Bergen Bank, for NOK 1.5 billion, of fear of the losses they would have if the company file for bankruptcy.
