= Nicolay Aarestrup =

Norwegian businessperson (1898–1983)

Nicolay Aarestrup (22 November 1898 – 10 December 1983) was a Norwegian businessperson.

He was born in Molde as a son of physician Peter Nicolay Aarestrup and Charlotte Louise Friis-Petersen. On October 28, 1924 he married Helene Julie Konow. They had two daughters, Else Helene and Sidsel. In 1954 he married merchant's daughter Ragnhild Sæther.

He took Bergen Commerce School in 1916, was an accountant from 1926 to 1945 before becoming chief executive officer of Vesta and Hygea in 1945. He remained so until 1968. From 1954 to 1968 he was also the chief executive of Investa, a company he co-founded. During his time, Vesta notably merged with Bergens Brand and Æolus in 1962.

He chaired Dalen Portland Cementfabrikk from 1961 to 1968, and was a board member of Norske Folks Livs- og Pensjonsforsikring from 1945 to 1968. He chaired De norske Livsforsikringsselskapers Forening from 1958 to 1962. He died in 1983.
