= Hjalmar Steenstrup =

- Born: 11 October 1890; Modum
- Died: 18 December 1945 (aged 55)
- Occupation: Insurance agent
- Employer: Samtrygd
- Known for: Editor of Hvem er hvem? 1930, 1934 and 1938; Milorg pioneer and intelligence agent

Hjalmar Steenstrup (11 October 1890 – 18 December 1945) was a Norwegian insurance agent, and Milorg pioneer and intelligence agent during World War II.

== Personal life ==
Steenstrup was born in Modum as a son of curate Hjalmar Steenstrup (1847–1915) and his wife Fredrikke Brun (1861–1905). He was a descendant of Paul Steenstrup and Peter Steenstrup, and a nephew of Johan Brun and brother-in-law of Gunnar Isachsen. He married Eva Glatved Martens (1896–1976) in August 1916 in Alversund.

== Career ==
Steenstrup worked for and later managed the insurance company Det norske gjensidige Skogbrandforsikringsselskab. He was co-founder and manager of the insurance association Samtrygd Gjensidig Norsk Forsikringsforening. He issued the book Hvem er hvem? (lit. "Who is Who?") for 1930, 1934 and 1938, and wrote journal articles on insurance matters as well as on language politics. He had been a co-founder of Riksmålsvernet in 1919.

== World War II ==
During the German occupation of Norway, Steenstrup was a central courier travelling between Norway and Sweden. He carried money from Government representative Anders Frihagen at the Norwegian legation in Stockholm to the underground movement in Norway. He was in contact with the British Special Operations Executive in Stockholm already in the Summer of 1940, and in contact with Malcolm Munthe at the British legation in Stockholm. He was given the task of finding a suitable military leader to coordinate the emerging military resistance in Norway, which resulted in the recruitment of Ole Berg. Under the cover name "Cato" he coordinated Milorg's transport of refugees from Norway to Sweden, and was also involved in intelligence. He was arrested in July 1941, and held at the prison Møllergata 19 until September 1943. After a period at the Grini concentration camp, he was transported to the Sachsenhausen concentration camp in Germany in November 1943, and stayed there the rest of the war. In Sachsenhausen, he was selected as "postmaster", distributing post, a position which gave him a good overview of other prisoners. By 1945, he could bring collected material on the fate of many prisoners to Sweden. He continued the registration work for the Norwegian Legation in Stockholm, and later for the Government in Oslo. He was selected to represent the Norwegian concentration camp prisoners during the Nuremberg Trials. He participated at preparations for the Nuremberg Trials in Germany in December 1945. On the return from Germany to Oslo, he died in a plane crash, the Voksenkollen accident.
