= Kommunal Landspensjonskasse =

Norwegian mutual insurance or pension fund

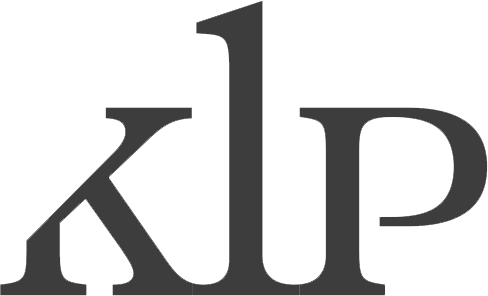
- Company type: Mutual
- Industry: Financial services
- Founded: 1949
- Headquarters: Oslo, Norway
- Area served: Norway
- Key people: Sverre Thornes (CEO); Arne Øren (chair)
- Revenue: NOK 43,581 million (2006)
- Operating income: NOK 5,086 million (2006)
- Net income: NOK 5,086 million (2006)
- Number of employees: 550 (2007)
- Subsidiaries: KLP Eiendom
- Website: www.klp.no

Kommunal Landspensjonskasse Gjensidig Forsikringsselskap or KLP is an Oslo-based mutual insurance company that manages the pensions of municipal employees in Norway. As of 31 March 2021, the fund had assets of NOK 813.5 billion (US$95.1 billion), with 337 municipal and county authorities, 31 health trusts and 2,300 public sector firms as clients.

It is Norway's largest pension fund and KLP Eiendom is a major subsidiary that manages real estate in Norway and Denmark. State employees are insured through the Norwegian Public Service Pension Fund.

== History ==
The company was founded as a managed fund under the Norsk Kollektiv Pensjonskasse on 15 February 1949 as a result of decisions by the Union of Norwegian Cities and the Norwegian Association of Rural Municipalities with the aim of offering municipal employees occupational pensions. It then managed the customers' occupational pension agreements.

The collaboration lasted until 1974 when KLP received its own license to operate an insurance company.

For the first 40 years, KLP was a company that primarily administered collective pension schemes in the municipalities. Throughout the 1990s, KLP developed the business further by, among other things, establishing its own non-life insurance company, property company and asset management company.

In 2011, seven municipalities and one county municipality chose to put their occupational pension scheme out to tender. After final consideration, seven out of eight chose KLP as provider of public service pension.

== Ethical divestment ==
Starting in 2004, KLP has occasionally divested from investments the company’s leadership finds ethically questionable. KLP is a member of the United Nations Principles for Responsible Investment (UNPRI) and publishes detailed explanations about why it excludes certain investments.

KLP also shares its ESG analysis with the Government Pension Fund Global (GPFG), Norway’s US$1.36 trillion sovereign wealth fund, which holds, on average, 1.4 per cent of all the world’s listed companies.

In 2001, KLP divested from Singapore Technologies Kinetics on account of its production of anti-personnel mines, an activity that was later exposed by the Thai Ministry of Foreign Affairs upon questioning by the International Campaign to Ban Landmines (ICBL).

In 2008, KLP divested from British private security firm G4S after a complaint was filed against the company with the OECD by the Union Network International over the company's alleged "symtematic violations of labor rights in twelve countries".

In 2014, KLP divested from all mining firms and power producers whose operations were more than 30% reliant on coal, in line with guidelines laid down by the Norwegian Parliament.

In 2017, KLP divested its shares in companies contracted to build the Dakota Access Pipeline after the Sami Parliament of Norway voiced its support for the Standing Rock Sioux community in the United States. KPL cited the "unacceptable risk of contributing to serious or systematic human rights violations", and the fact that the pipeline construction required the flooding of land protected by the 1851 Treaty of Fort Laramie.

In March 2019, KLP cut its investment in Washington H Soul Pattinson over its financial ties to the coal industry, and in May 2019, announced it was blacklisting a further 46 companies deriving more than 5% of their revenue from coal-based activities, including AGL Energy, BHP, Origin Energy and South32.

In October 2019, KLP divested from four Canadian energy names and said it would no longer invest in companies more than 5% reliant on oilsands, with CEO Sverre Thornes noting: "By going coal and oilsands free, we are sending a strong message on the urgency of shifting from fossil to renewable energy."

In June 2021, KLP divested from Adani Ports over its plans to build container terminal in Yangon on land leased from a Myanmar-owned conglomerate, a situation that the fund said presented an "imminent danger" that armed forces could use the port to import weapons and equipment, or as a naval base.

On 5 July 2021, KLP said it would divest from 16 business entities for their links to Israeli settlements in the occupied West Bank, after the companies were named in a United Nations report listing 112 companies that it said were helping further settlement activities, which are considered illegal under international law.

On 28 February 2022, KLP said it would divest entirely from Russia in response to Russian invasion of Ukraine. Their Russian assets had a total value of nearly NOK 500 million (US$56.39 million) in 22 companies, including energy firms Gazprom, Lukoil and Rosneft; and banks VTB and Sberbank.

In June 2024, KLP divested from American company Caterpillar due to the use of their bulldozers in occupied Palestinian territory. In June 2025, KLP said it was divesting from Oshkosh Corporation and ThyssenKrupp over their role in the Gaza war.

In November 2024, KLP paused all divestment for a review of their standards and policies. Finance minister Jens Stoltenberg said that under current ethical guidelines the wealth fund “may not be able to invest in the world’s largest companies” and would lose its mandate to be a globally diversified investment portfolio.
