= L. S. Karlsen =

Lars Siegfried Karlsen, usually referred to as L. S. Karlsen (14 December 1857 – 1946) was a Norwegian engineer and businessperson.

He was born in Tromsø. He took his education at Trondhjem Technical School in chemistry and mechanics, and studied for one year at the Royal Saxon Polytechnicum (now Dresden University of Technology). He was hired as a manager of Sundnæs Brænderi. In 1888 he was hired as an inspector in the insurance company Forsikringsselskapet Norden. From 1896 to 1897 he was a state controller of liquor and malt production, but from July 1897 to 1933 he was the chief executive of Forsikringsselskapet Norden. In 1916 he entered the first board of the Scandinavian American Assurance Corporation. In 1937 he received an honorary distinction from the Norwegian Polytechnic Society.

He resided in Uranienborg.

Business positions
Preceded by C. F. Gjerdrum	Chief executive of Forsikringsselskapet Norden; 1897–1933	Succeeded by Harald Sommerfeldt
