= Sparebanken Sogn og Fjordane =

Norwegian savings bank

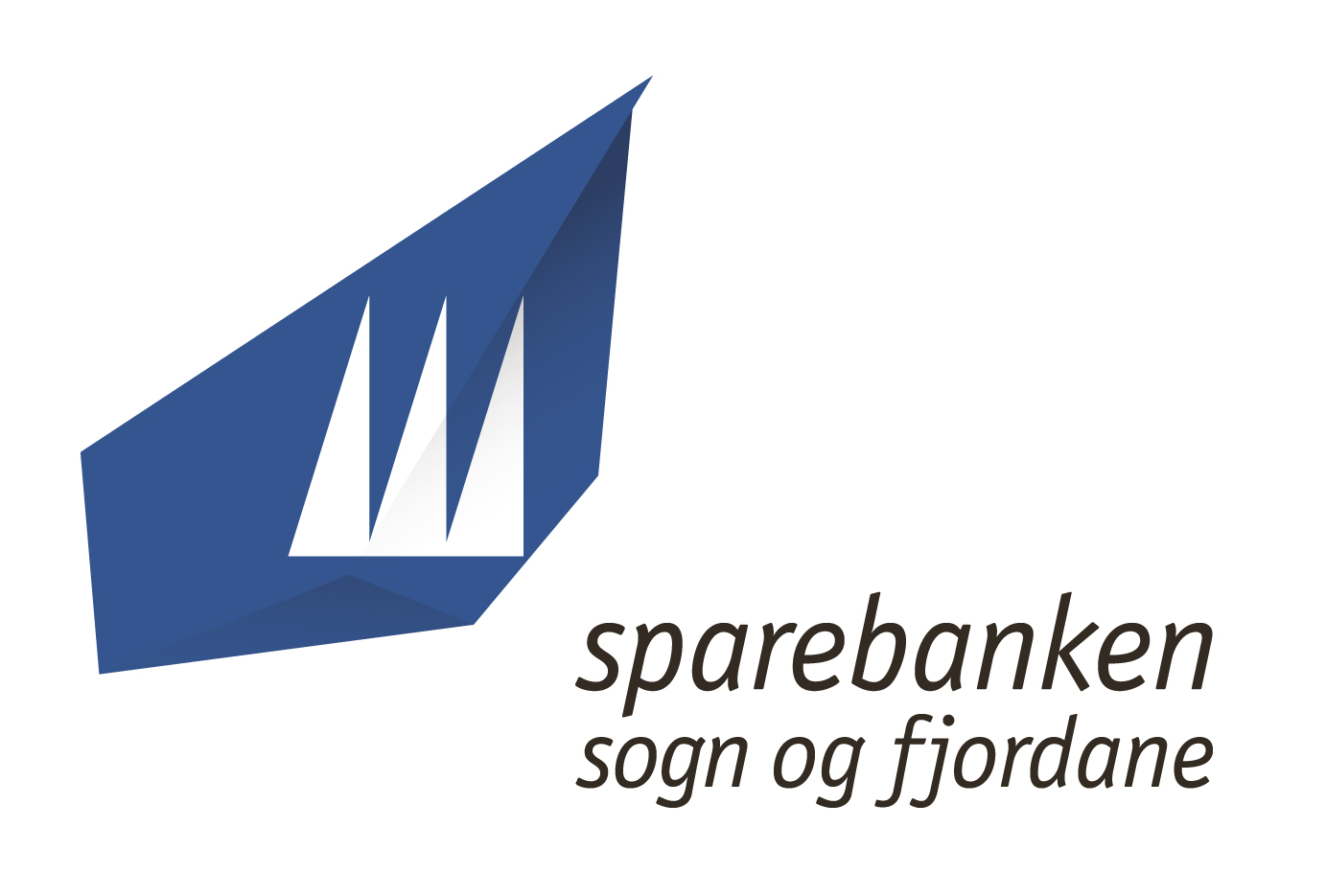

Sparebanken Sogn og Fjordane (SSF) is the largest bank in the county of Sogn og Fjordane, with total assets of NOK 32 billion and 310 employees. The bank has 23 branches in the county and is present in 21 of the county's 26 municipalities. It also has a branch in Bergen. The head office is located in Førde in Sunnfjord.

The bank was one of the first savings banks in Norway to adapt the new legal regulations for the financial sector in Norway by forming Sparebankstiftinga Sogn og Fjordane. The bank's own funds were converted into equity share capital and primary capital. Sparebankstiftinga Sogn og Fjordane owns 94,12% and Sparebankstiftinga Fjaler owns the remaining 5,88% of the equity certificates. Consequently, the bank has a new executive committee and a new board of directors from September 2010. The chairman of the board is Hallgeir Kleppe. Elin Schei Stuhaug is chairwoman of the new executive committee, consisting of 45 members.

The Bank has entered into a strategic alliance with Frende Forsikring ASA. This means that all customers in the bank also can buy their insurances there.

== Group ==
In addition to the parent bank, the Group operates through the following wholly owned subsidiaries:

- Bustadkreditt Sogn og Fjordane AS (mortgage credit institution)
- Bankeigedom Sogn og Fjordane AS (property management)
- Eigedomsmekling Sogn og Fjordane (real estate)

== History ==
Sparebanken Sogn og Fjordane is over 160 years old, and started as a merger of over 25 savings banks. The bank was named Førde Sparebank in 1842, whilst Sparebanken Sogn og Fjordane was established 1 April 1988 as a result of a merger between Balestrand Sparebank, Gaular Sparebank, Gloppens Sparebank, Hornindals Sparebank, Innvik Sparebank, Leikanger Sparebank, Stryn Sparebank and Sunnfjord Sparebank.
