= Forsikringsselskapet Norden =

Norwegian insurance company

Forsikringsselskapet Norden was a general insurance company based in Norway.

It was founded as Brandforsikringsselskabet Norden on 4 April 1867, and began operating on 2 September the same year. Its first offices were located in Karl Johans gate 14. The main driving forces behind the foundation were Carl Ferdinand Gjerdrum and Jacob Thurmann Ihlen, who became the first chief executive and first chair respectively. Gjerdrum served until 1887 and Ihlen to 1904. The next chief executive was L. S. Karlsen from 1887 to 1933; he was succeeded by Harald Sommerfeldt. From 1958 to 1971 Erik Ø. Poulsson was at the helm.

In 1970 the company announced plans to form the holding company Nordengruppen together with the insurance companies Sigyn and Norske Alliance. The cooperation finally materialized in September 1971. The three companies continued as semi-independent, but under a common board of directors. In Nordengruppen, the former shareholders in Norden got 64% of the shares while the former shareholders of Sigyn and Norske Alliance got 18% each. The headquarters were located together with Norden in Akersgata. The first chair and deputy chair of the board became Amund Ringnes and Chr. Ringnes, and the first chair and deputy chair of the supervisory council became Rein Henriksen and Einar Rasmussen.

In 1982 Nordengruppen announced plans to merge with Storebrand. The merger happened in 1983.
