= Carl Ferdinand Gjerdrum =

Carl Ferdinand Gjerdrum (21 August 1821 – 3 August 1902) was a Norwegian jurist, businessperson and royal chamberlain.

He was a son of Ole Gjerdrum and Mette Alette Christine Krohn. He was the brother of Jørgen and Otto Gjerdrum. He was the father of Albert Gjerdrum. Through his sister Alette Jørgine Constanse Gjerdrum (1833–1891), he was a brother-in-law of dean Halfdan Einar Sommerfelt (1830–1901) .

He finished his secondary education in 1840 and took the cand.jur. degree in 1844. He was an attorney from 1861. From 1854 to 1866, he was the agent-general in Norway for the Swedish insurance company Skandia. Together with Jacob Thurmann Ihlen, he was a founder of the insurance company Forsikringsselskapet Norden and was the company's chief executive from 1867 to 1897. When he retired in July 1897 because of declining health, he was almost 76 years old.

He also served as a chamberlain for Carl XV of Sweden from the time of his coronation in 1860 until the death of the king in 1872. He is known for writing a diary from the coronation of Carl XV in 1860.

Business positions
Preceded by position created	Chief executive of Forsikringsselskapet Norden; 1867–1897	Succeeded by L. S. Karlsen
