= Erik Mollatt =

Norwegian businessperson (born 1941)

Erik James Momme Mollatt (born 3 April 1941) is a Norwegian businessperson.

He was born in Rygge as the younger brother of Ralph Mollatt, and graduated in economics from the American University in 1967. He was the CEO of M. Peterson & Søn from 1983 to 2002, and under his leadership the company became one of Norway's largest within the field of packaging. He was also instrumental in erecting a statue of Christian Frederik in the city of Moss, to commemorate the Convention of Moss. For his contributions to industry and culture, in 2003 he was proclaimed Knight, First Class of the Royal Norwegian Order of St. Olav. He is also one of two honorary members in the Industrial Association of the city of Moss, the other being Tor Tank-Nielsen.

Mollatt resides in Hobøl, and has a fortune of about US$1.8 million.
