= Åge Korsvold =

Norwegian businessman

- Born: 8 April 1946; Oslo
- Education: Wharton School

Åge Korsvold (born 8 April 1946) is a Norwegian businessperson and since 2006 chief executive officer of Kistefos.

He was born in Oslo. He is educated in business administration from the University of Pennsylvania in 1971. He started working for Storebrand in 1972 before becoming chief financial officer in Golden West Shipping Co. in 1976 and then in Orkla Industrier in 1977. From 1983 to 1992 Korsvold was consultant in Fondsfinans, and from 1992 to 1994 CEO of Procorp. In 1994 he became CEO in UNI Storebrand.

He played a central role under the failed merger negotiations between UNI Storebrand and Kredittkassen in 1997 and was also central in the acquisition plans for the Swedish-Finninsh MeritaNordbanken in the fall of 1999. In 2000 he was forced to resign, and was later reported by the Norwegian National Authority for the Investigation and Prosecution of Economic and Environmental Crime for illegal option trade.

He was chairman of the board of the Orkla Group briefly in 2000, as he was elected by the corporate council in September, but resigned after leaving Storebrand. He started as CEO of Kistefos in 2001. From 2003 he is also chairman of Ementor.

Business positions
Preceded by Per Terje Vold	Chief executive officer of Storebrand; 1994–2000	Succeeded by Idar Kreutzer
Preceded by Svein Ribe Anderssen	Chair of the Orkla Group; September 2000–October 2000	Succeeded by Finn Hvistendahl
