= Arnfinn Hofstad =

Norwegian businessperson (1934–2025)

Arnfinn Hofstad (16 March 1934 – 4 August 2025) was a Norwegian businessman.

== Life and career ==
Hofstad hailed from Stiklestad. He took the siv.øk. degree at the Norwegian School of Economics in 1958, started working in Asbjørn Habberstad AS before being hired in Nordenfjelske Treforedling in Skogn Municipality in 1963. After a period from 1972 to 1980 as chief executive officer in Bøndernes Salgslag, he returned to the paper industry as vice-chief executive in Norske Skogindustrier. He was then Norske Skog's chief executive from 1982 to 1994.

Hofstad served as chairman of the board in Telenor (retiring in 2000) and Coop NKL, and was deputy chairman of Statoil from 1987 to 1997. He also served as acting chairman of Statoil in 1996. He also chaired Forenede Forsikring, Tofte Industrier, Union Co, Follum Fabrikker and Saugbrugsforeningen, and was a board member of Vår Bank og Forsikring and Landsbanken. In 2003 he was decorated as a Knight, First Class of the Order of St. Olav.

Hofstad resided in Levanger with a long-time secondary domicile in Frogner, Oslo. He died on 4 August 2025, at the age of 91, and was buried at Frogner Church.

Business positions
Preceded by Rolv Lindseth	Chief executive officer of Norske Skog; 1982–1994	Succeeded by Jan Reinås
Preceded by Egil Abrahamsen	Chair of Telenor; 1995–2000	Succeeded by Eivind Reiten
Preceded by Helge Kvamme	Chair of Statoil (acting); 1996	Succeeded by Kjell O. Kran
