= Ralph Mollatt =

Norwegian businessman

Ralph Mollatt (28 March 1926 – 5 August 1983) was a Norwegian businessperson.

He was born in Oslo, and studied in Syracuse, New York and Grenoble. He worked in the family company M. Peterson & Søn, and was CEO from 1963 to 1980. His younger brother Erik was later CEO from 1983 to 2002.

For his work, Ralph Mollatt was decorated with the Royal Norwegian Order of St. Olav.
