= Norwegian Bankers' Association =

The Norwegian Bankers' Association (Norwegian: Den norske Bankforening) was an employers' organisation in Norway, organized under the national Confederation of Norwegian Enterprise.

It was established in 1915, but in 2000 it was merged with the Association of Norwegian Insurance Companies to form the Norwegian Financial Services Association.
