= Juul Bjerke =

Norwegian economist and politician

Juul Bjerke (14 April 1928 – 28 February 2014) was a Norwegian economist.

He was born in Hof, Vestfold. He took the cand.oecon degree and was hired in Statistics Norway in 1950. He served as State Secretary in the Ministry of Finance from 1971 to 1972, in Bratteli's First Cabinet. He was later a head of department in Statistics Norway from 1973 to 1983, then led the Economy Department at the Norwegian Confederation of Trade Unions from 1983 to 1993. He was also a member of the board of directors of the Bank of Norway from 1978 to 1993.

He is the father of Siri and Rune Bjerke, and father-in-law of Libe Rieber-Mohn. He died in February 2014 in Motril, Spain.
