= Jørgen Breder Faye =

Norwegian banker and politician (1823–1908)

Jørgen Breder Faye (7 June 1823 – 2 August 1908) was a Norwegian banker and politician.

== Biography ==
Faye was born in Bergen, Norway. He was the son of Christen Faye (1781-1836) and Magdalene Christine Wiese (1791-1878). His father was a master baker who died when Faye was thirteen years of age. Following the death of his father, Faye worked for his mother's brother Georg Wiese, who operated a brewery in the commercial district of Finnegården in Bryggen. He took over the uncle's business in 1846.

Faye worked as a merchant at Bryggen until he in 1856 was appointed chief executive officer of the newly created commercial bank Bergens Privatbank; a position he held until 1903. He sat in the Bergen city council from 1851 and was mayor in 1862.

He was elected to represent Bergen in the Norwegian Parliament, sitting for three periods in 1856-58, 1865–67 and 1868-71.

== Honors ==
- Knight of the Order of St. Olav in 1857, Command Cross in 1891 and Commander 1st grade in 1895
- Knight of the Swedish Order of the Polar Star

Preceded by Joachim J. M. Ege	Mayor of Bergen; 1862	Succeeded by Joachim J. M. Ege
