= Glitne =

Insurance company based in Norway

Glitne was a general insurance company based in Norway. It was named after Glitnir in Norse mythology.

It was founded as Folkepensjonskassen Glitne on 17 December 1889, and was an early measure for social security. It merged with Gjensidige in 1968.
