= Stein Hannevik =

Norwegian banker (born 1954)

Stein Andreas Hannevik (born 1954) is a Norwegian banker.

He was hired as CEO of Sparebanken Pluss in 2000. Before this he was the executive of Bergshav Shipholding. He chairs the boards of the cultural hall Kilden in Kristiansand. In 2009 he became chair of the Norwegian Savings Banks Association. In late 2009 he was selected as deputy chair of the new organization Finance Norway.

He resides in Lillesand Municipality.
