= Sarpsborg Papp =

Sarpsborg Papp AS
- Industry: Paper industry
- Founded: 1914
- Fate: Bought by M. Peterson & Søn, 1961
- Headquarters: Sarpsborg, Norway

Sarpsborg Papp AS was a Norwegian industrial company, which ran a packaging plant in Sarpsborg, Norway.

Founded in 1914 as Sarpsborg Emballagefabrik, it was the first corrugated paper factory in Norway. In 1961 the company was acquired by M. Peterson & Søn. It was M. Peterson & Søn's first acquirement in the field of packaging.

The Peterson name having been introduced in all sub-companies in 1992, the production unit at Sarpsborg is now named Peterson Emballasje AS, Sarpsborg, organized within the branch Peterson Packaging.
