= Bergens Privatbank =

Norwegian commercial bank

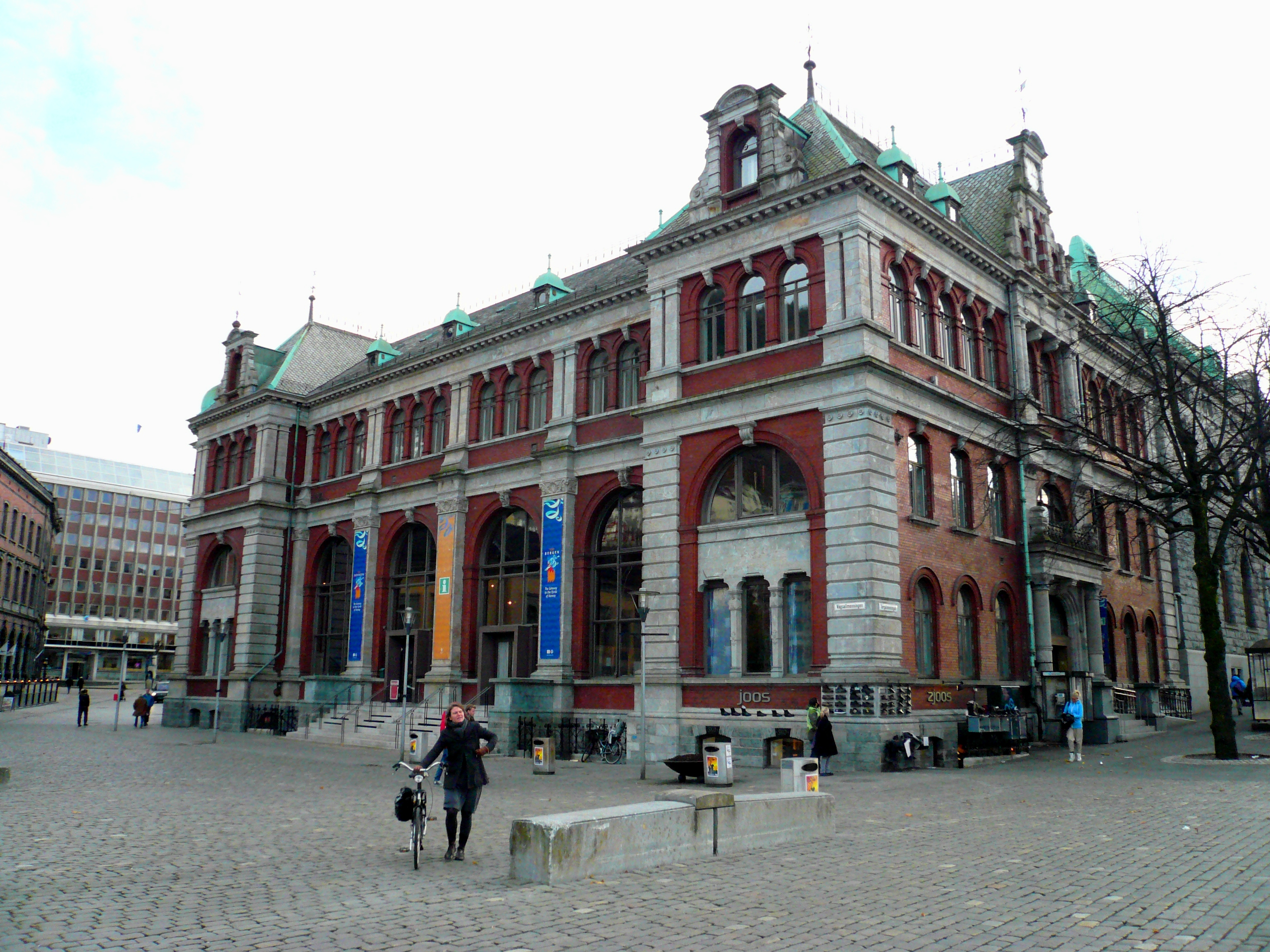
The bank's main branch in Bergen from 1967, the former location of Bergen Stock Exchange

Bergens Privatbank was a Norwegian commercial bank based in Bergen. It was established in 1855 and built a network of branches throughout the country. Jørgen Breder Faye was the first director and held the position until 1904. The bank merged with Bergens Kreditbank in 1975 to establish Bergen Bank.
