= KLP Eiendom =

Norwegian real estate company

KLP Eiendom AS
- Type: Subsidiary
- Industry: Real estate
- Founded: 17 June 2005
- Headquarters: Oslo, Norway
- Area served: Norway
- Parent: Kommunal Landspensjonskasse

KLP Eiendom is a Norwegian real estate management company owned by Kommunal Landspensjonskasse (KLP). It manages a portfolio of real estate on behalf of the clients of KLP, municipal and county employees. Most of the investments are located in Oslo and Trondheim, though there are other localities in Norway too, in addition to some in Denmark and Sweden. The total portfolio includes more than 1.700.000 square meters. Included in the portfolio are a number of shopping centers and hotels.

== Trondheim ==
The portfolio in Trondheim is organized as a separate company, KLP Eiendom Trondheim AS. It was founded as Trondheim Næringsbygg in 1988 by the city council, but was later privatized. The portfolio includes 190,000 square meters of mainly offices in 29 buildings. Notable buildings include Technobyen, the police station, the nursing department of Sør-Trøndelag University College and all the municipally run parking houses in town. KLP took over the company in 2001.
