= Idar Kreutzer =

Norwegian businessman (born 1962)

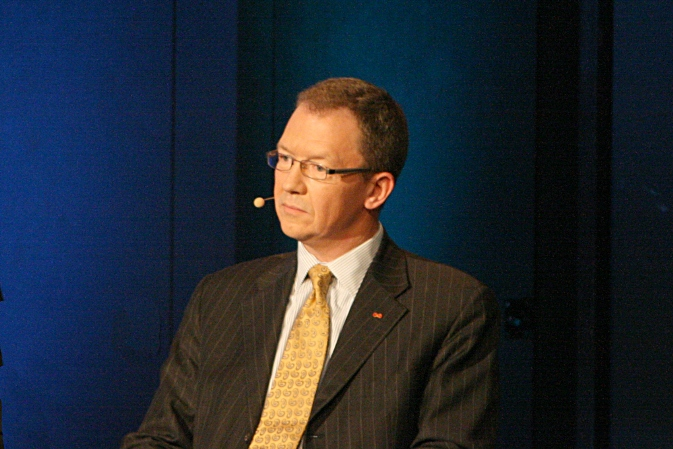
Idar Kreutzer, 2009.

Idar Kreutzer (born 29 August 1962) is a Norwegian businessperson.

He has a master's degree in economics and business administration from the Norwegian School of Economics. From 1986 to 1987 he was a political secretary for Conservative City Commissioner Michael Tetzschner in Oslo. Kreutzer has been with Storebrand since 1992, was a director from 1995 to 2000 and was appointed as chief executive officer in 2000. He was acting CEO after Åge Korsvold left in October 2000, and was hired on a permanent basis in December 2000.

On 7 May 2012, Storebrand announced that Idar Kreutzer would leave Storebrand and join Finance Norway as managing director. His departure was effective as of 1 June 2012.

Business positions
Preceded by Åge Korsvold	Chief executive officer of Storebrand; 2000–present	Incumbent
