= Bergen Bank =

Norwegian commercial bank

Bergen Bank AS
- Industry: Banking
- Founded: 1975
- Defunct: 1990
- Fate: Merged
- Successor: Den norske Bank
- Headquarters: Bergen, Norway

Bergen Bank was a Norwegian commercial bank in existence between 1975 and 1990. It was created as a merger between Bergens Privatbank (founded in 1855) and Bergens Kreditbank (founded in 1928) while the bank Kvam Privatbank was acquired in 1979. In 1988 it bought Nevi. Bergen Bank, which was based in Bergen, Norway, merged with Den norske Creditbank in 1990 to form Den norske Bank. It is now part of DnB NOR.

== Criticism ==
The bank was the target of massive demonstrations in 1976 after three female employees at Per Hestvik & Co in Mo i Rana were fired with the reason that they were members of Kvinnefronten, a women's rights movement. The reason for the firing was that Bergen Bank denied the bank credit if they did not fire the employees.
