= Hygea (company) =

Norwegian life insurance company

Livsforsikringsselskapet Hygea was a life insurance company based in Bergen, Norway.

It was founded in 1883. It was for many years a part of the Vesta Group, and shared leadership with the Vesta Group's flagship Vesta; together they were branded as Vesta-Hygea. After the Vesta Group was bought by Skandia in 1989, the new owners decided to merge Hygea with Norsk Kollektiv Pensjonskasse in 1990 to create Vital Forsikring.
