= Postbanken =

Norwegian bank

- Formerly: Norges Postsparebank; Norges Postbank
- Type: Division
- Industry: Banking
- Founded: 1948
- Defunct: 2011
- Fate: Merged into DnB NOR
- Headquarters: Oslo, Norway
- Area served: Norway
- Key people: Jarle Mortensen (CEO)
- Parent: Government of Norway (1948-1999); DnB NOR (1999-2011)

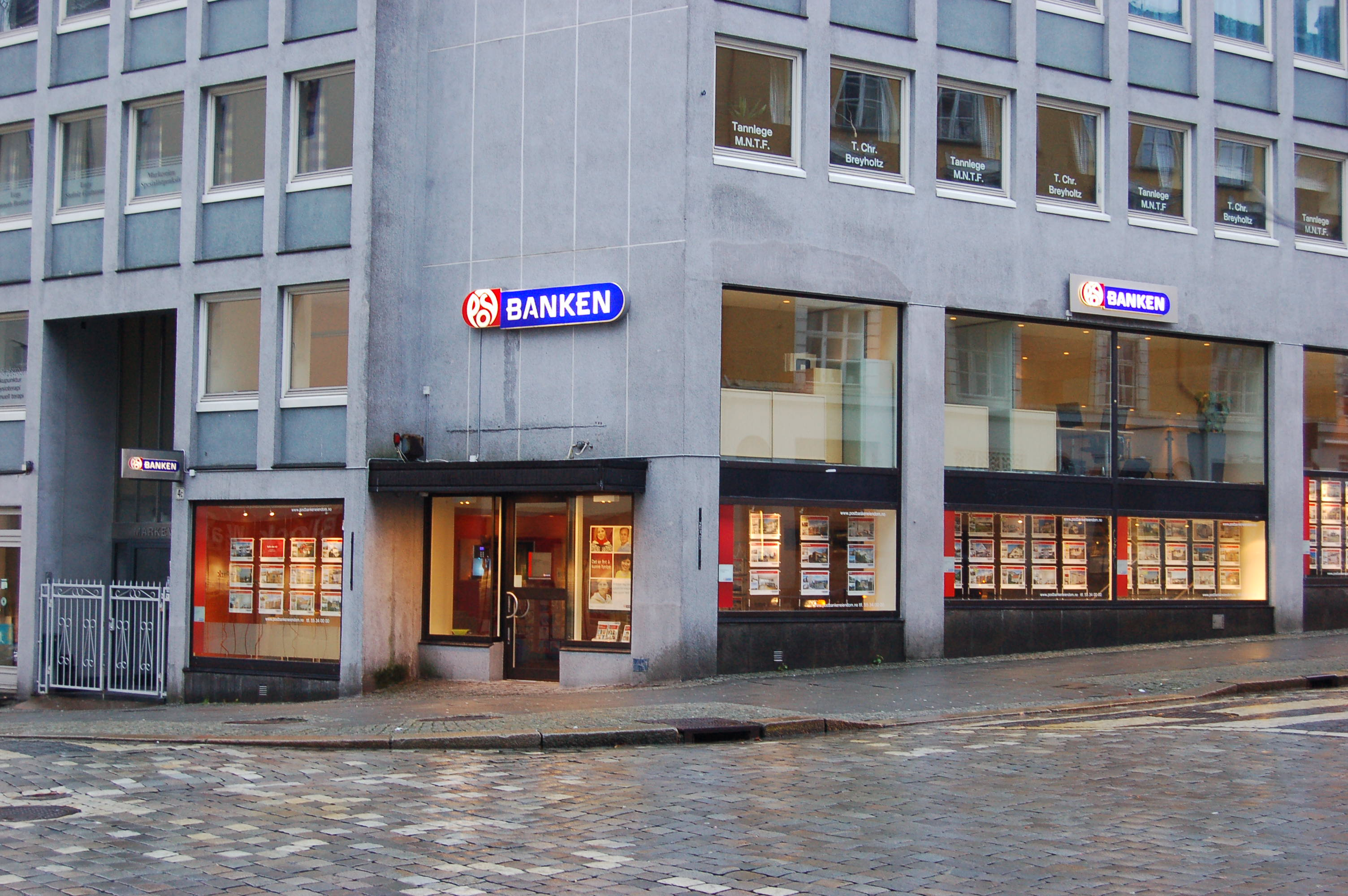
Postbanken outlet in downtown Bergen in 2007.

Postbanken (lit. The Postal Bank) was a Norwegian postal savings bank. The bank offered its services through the Norwegian post office. It was first merged into DNB ASA as a subsidiary, and then dissolved in 2011.

== History ==
Postbanken was founded in 1948 after major political battle as Norges Postsparebank with the goal to incurate to savings, though the maximum amount allowed to be saved per person was set to NOK 10,000. In 1948, the bank had services provided at 3,600 post offices and post outlets. The first loans were often large and given to investments in rural areas.

Until 1999, the bank was owned by the Government of Norway, but then it was merged with DnB NOR. The bank dissolved in 2011. In 2001, the Postal Giro System was bought by Bankenes Betalingssentral and the year after the two giro systems merged, making the 60-year-old postgiro system history.
