= Hvem er hvem? =

Norwegian book series

Hvem er hvem? (English: Who is Who?) was a Norwegian book series, presenting facts about notable persons from Norway. The first edition was issued in 1912, and the 14th edition came in 1994. From 1938, the plan was to publish such a book every three years, but the Second World War made that impossible. At the time, such a book was published annually in Denmark and every two years in Sweden. In the 2008 edition, edited by Knut Olav Åmås, one thousand persons were selected for presentation. About one third of the articles are longer, signed biographies, while the rest have a shorter, more encyclopedic format.

The latest edition was edited by Knut Olav Åmås and narrowed down to 1,000 people. This differs from the older ones in style in that the articles are in a more journalistic style with personal characteristics, in addition to the purely biographical year information. About 340 of the 1,000 biographies also have signed authors.

== Edition history ==
- 1912 (First edition, edited by Chr. Brinchmann, Anders Daae and K.V. Hammer). 3,500 biographies.
- 1930 (2nd edition, edited by Hjalmar Steenstrup). 3,250 biographies, of which 1,750 are new.
- 1934 (3rd edition, edited by Hjalmar Steenstrup)
- 1938 (4th edition, edited by Hjalmar Steenstrup)
- 1948 (5th edition, edited by Harald Gram and Bjørn Steenstrup).
- 1950 (6th edition, edited by Harald Gram and Bjørn Steenstrup)
- 1955 (7th edition, edited by Harald Gram and Bjørn Steenstrup)
- 1959 (8th edition, edited by Harald Gram and Bjørn Steenstrup)
- 1964 (9th edition, edited by Bjørn Steenstrup)
- 1968 (10th edition, edited by Bjørn Steenstrup)
- 1973 (11th edition, edited by Bjørn Steenstrup). 3,840 biographies, of which 520 are new.
- (12th edition)
- (13th edition)
- 1994 (14th edition)
- 2008 (edited by Knut Olav Åmås, ISBN 978-82-03-23561-0, 665 pp.)

The 1st, 2nd, 5th and 11th editions are available online.

== See also ==
- Who's Who
