= Annar Poulsson =

Norwegian businessman

Bård Annar Poulsson (23 March 1911 – 23 November 1996) was a Norwegian businessperson in the insurance industry.

He was born in Bærum as a son of Einar Poulsson (1884–1968) and Aagot Sundt Hansen (1884–1971). His father was a director in the insurance company Assuranceforeningen Skuld. In 1938 he married Colonel's daughter Else Johanne Møller. He was a brother-in-law of insurance director Erik Ø. Poulsson.

He finished his secondary education in 1929, and graduated from the Royal Frederick University in 1935 with a cand.jur. degree. He studied marine insurance in London, Rouen and Hamburg from 1936 to 1937. He was hired as a secretary in Assuranceforeningen Skuld, working together with his father, and was promoted to assisting director in 1943 and chief executive officer in 1947. He retired in 1980. His son Håvar Poulsson took over.

He chaired the Norwegian Maritime Law Association from 1971, and at the same time became a board member of the Comité Maritime International. He was a board member of the International Tanker Owners Pollution Federation since 1968 as well as a supervisory council member of Det Norske Veritas since 1948.

He received the Defence Medal 1940–1945 and was decorated as a Knight, First Class of the Order of St. Olav (1972) and Commander of the Order of the Polar Star. Poulsson was also admitted into the exclusive skiing-based social club SK Ull in 1946. He served as its auditor from 1953 to 1970 and became vice chairman in 1973. He resided at Langodden at Snarøya. He died in November 1996 and was buried at Vestre gravlund.
