= Norsk Kollektiv Pensjonskasse =

Norwegian life insurance company

Norsk Kollektiv Pensjonskasse was a life insurance company based in Bergen, Norway.

It was founded in 1938. In 1990 the owners decided to merge it with Hygea to create Vital Forsikring.
