= Bergens Kreditbank =

Former Norwegian bank

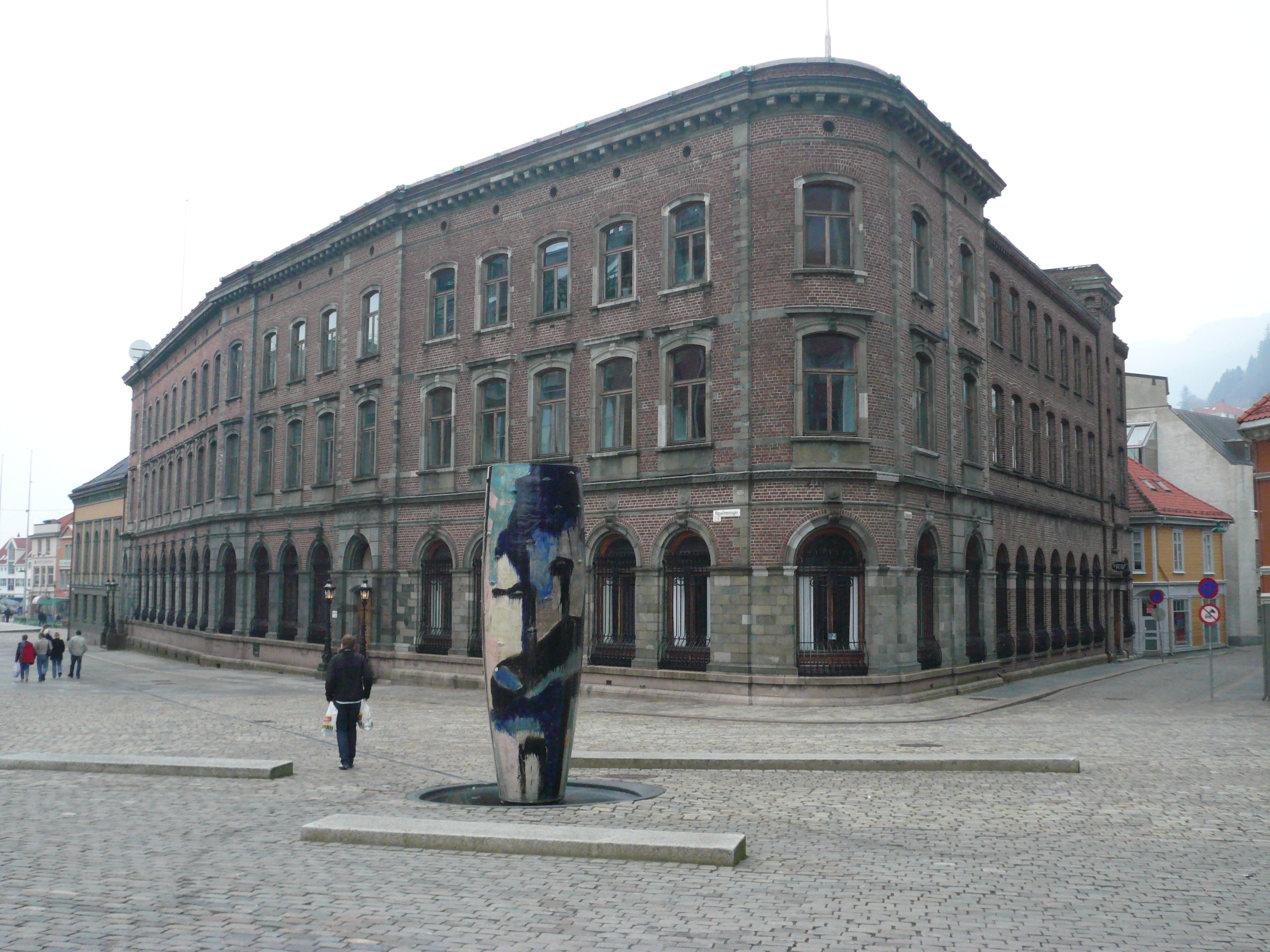
The bank's offices at Vågsallmenningen

Bergens Kreditbank was a Norwegian commercial bank based in Bergen. It was established in 1928 with its main offices in Vågsallmenningen. It merged with Bergens Privatbank in 1975 to establish Bergen Bank.
