= Norwegian Savings Banks Association =

Logo.

The Norwegian Savings Banks Association (Norwegian: Sparebankforeningen) is the trade organization for savings banks in Norway.

It was founded in 1914 as Centralforeningen for Norges Sparebanker. Director since 2002 is Arne Hyttnes. The board currently consists of Stein Hannevik (chair), Liv Fiksdahl, Helge Roar Dalen, Finn Haugan, Elisabeth Johansen, Hilde Kraggerud, Anlaug Johansen, Olav Arne Fiskerstrand and Ivar Fjærtoft.

In 2010 it founded the cooperation organization Finance Norway together with the Norwegian Financial Services Association. Both organizations still exist, but not their respective "service offices", whose tasks were taken over by Finance Norway. The headquarters are in Oslo.
