= Samtrygd =

Samtrygd was an insurance company based in Oslo, Norway.

It was founded as Samtrygd, Norsk Gjensidige Forsikringsforening in 1922 as a reinsurance company for 260 smaller fire treasuries. From 1958 it developed several types of general insurance. It shared manager with the car insurance Norsk Bilforsikring Gjensidige for many years, merging in 1974. In the same year, it started a cooperation with the life insurance company Livsforsikringsselskapet Gjensidige, and in 1976 the Gjensidige name and logo became the sole in use.

== CEOs and chairs ==
The chief executives and board chairmen of Samtrygd were:

Chief executives

- 1922-1941: Hjalmar Steenstrup
- 1941-1958: A. H. Andersen
- 1958: Rolf Løchen (acting)
- 1958-1984: Jæger Dokk (from 1976 in Gjensidige Skade)

Chairs

- 1922-1934: Rasmus Mortensen
- 1935-1943: Johan E. Mellbye
- 1943-1946: Kristoffer Skraastad
- 1946-1959: Arne Bull
- 1959-1961: Ottar Opsand
- 1961-1969: Søren Folvik
- 1969-: Ola T. Ruud
