= Peterson (company) =

Peterson AS
- Industry: Paper industry
- Founded: 1801
- Defunct: 2015
- Headquarters: Moss, Norway
- Key people: Terje Haglund (chair); Per A. Lilleng; Per C. Kløvstad
- Revenue: 3.4 billion kr
- Number of employees: 1,595
- Subsidiaries: Peterson Packaging; Peterson Linerboard
- Website: www.peterson.no

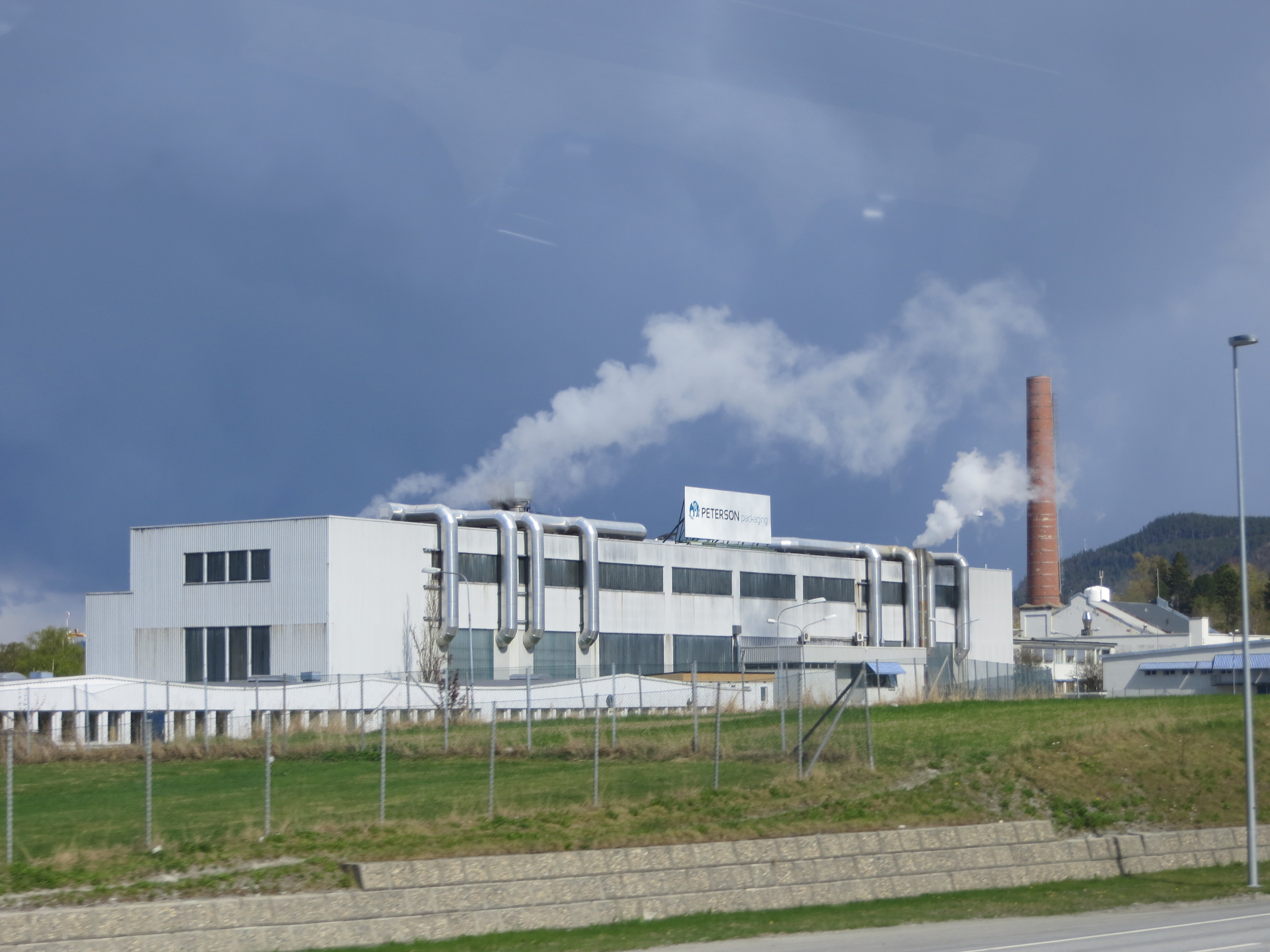
Peterson plant at Ranheim in Trondheim

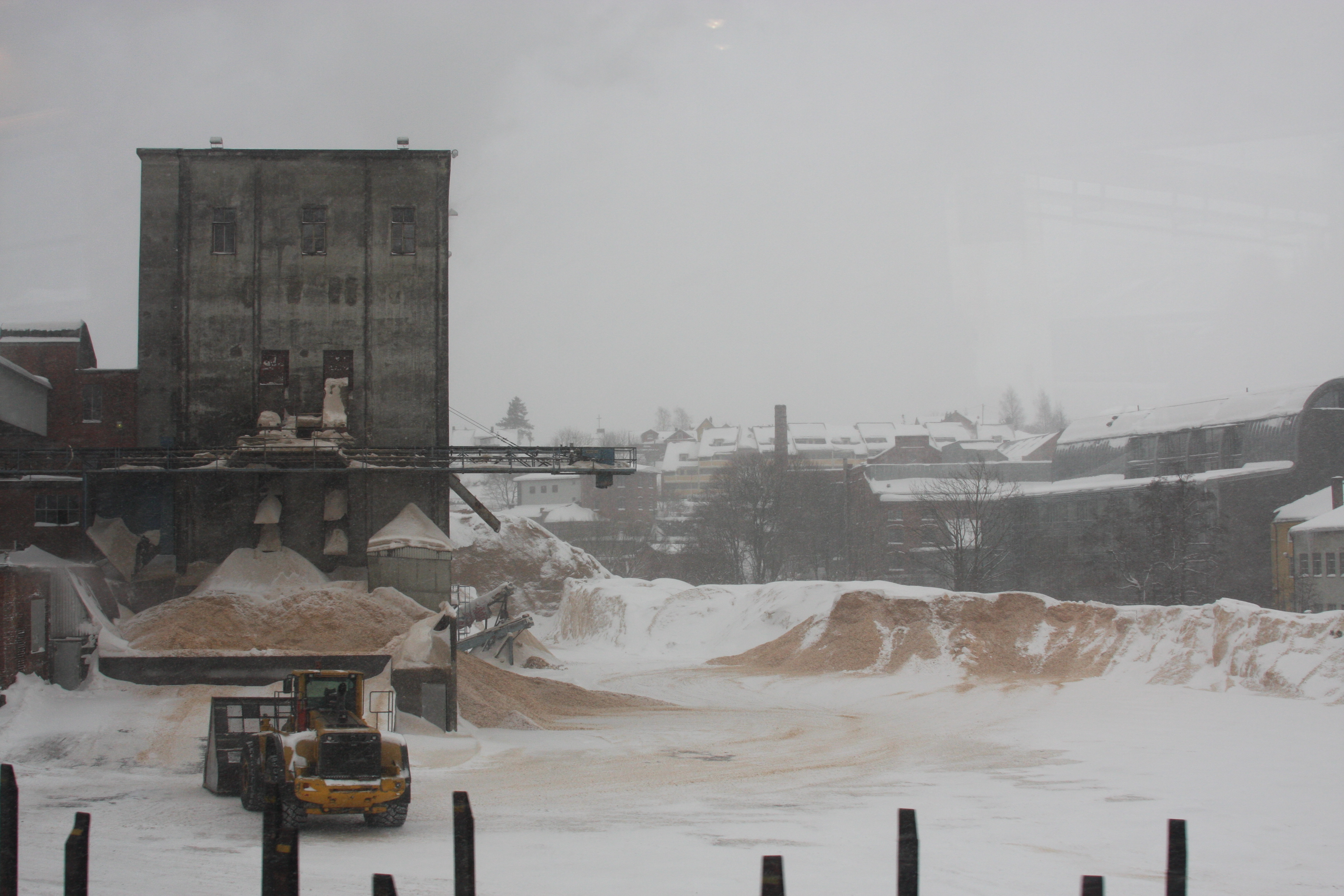
Peterson pulp dumpfill at the main factory in Moss

Peterson AS is an industrial corporation based in Moss, Norway. Until 2006 it was known as M. Peterson & Søn.

== History ==
It traces its roots to a company founded in 1801 by Danish-born merchant Momme Peterson (1771–1835). Originally a small general store with various groceries and manufactured goods, he later opened a spinning mill. In 1828 the company took the name M. Peterson & Søn. Peterson also expanded to trade with timber, and from 1848, the building and owning of ships. In 1875 it bought Moss Jernverk which had had a good location.

Having combined timber and shipping, in 1883 the company left the shipping business under the leadership of Theodor Peterson, grandson of the founder. Instead, the company ventured in production of cellulose sulfate with the opening of the factory Moss Cellulosefabrik. From 1898, paper was also produced. Hans Blom Peterson, a descendant of Momme Peterson, served as CEO from 1901 to 1954 and concentrated on developing this part of the company. He also started production of paper sacks. Though Blom Peterson died in 1954 the company remained family owned; in 1963 another descendant Ralph Mollatt took over the leadership. Together with his brother Erik he gradually shunted the company towards the packaging business. In their period, M. Peterson & Søn bought several entities within the paper industry, including Sarpsborg Papp (1961), Norsk Papiremballage (1963), Polycoat (1964), Greaker Industrier (1979) and Ranheim Papirfabrikk (1983). Erik Mollatt was CEO from 1983 to 2002.

In 2001, the unit Peterson Scanproof (a successor of Greaker Industrier) was split from M. Peterson & Søn to form a company of its own, Nordic Paper. M. Peterson & Søn still owned Nordic Paper, albeit jointly with Norske Skogindustrier, but sold it in 2006. In the same year, M. Peterson & Søn was bought in its entirety by investors, including local businesspeople as well as the forest owners' association AT Skog. At the same time, the name was changed from M. Peterson & Søn to just Peterson.

== Structure ==
In 1989 a new corporate model was introduced, with the ten individual companies grouped under one umbrella—M. Peterson & Søn, still family owned. Various transactions between 1998 and 2001, including the selling of Peterson Scanproof and the acquiring of the solid board division of UPM-Kymmene, left a corporate structure with M. Peterson & Søn as the parent, and Peterson Packaging and Peterson Linerboard as branches. Peterson Packaging is further subdivided into Peterson Packaging OY and Peterson Emballasje AS, the distinction between the two being that the latter operates in Norway while the former operates abroad. Since the Peterson name was introduced in all sub-companies in 1992, each production unit is named according to its location and field. For instance, the factory formerly known as Sarpsborg Papp is formally named Peterson Emballasje AS, Sarpsborg.

In addition to factories in several countries, the company operates numerous sales offices spread around Europe.

== Logo ==
The original company logo was based on the violet. In 1930 the current elephant theme was introduced. It fell into disuse in the 1970s, but made its return in 1984. The elephant body forms the letters M-O-S-S, in reference to the company's foundation city. The object carried by the elephant is not a tree trunk, but a roll of paper fresh off the mill.
