= Sparebanken NOR =

1990s Norwegian bank

Union Bank of Norway
- Industry: Banking
- Founded: 1990
- Defunct: 1999
- Fate: Merged
- Successor: Gjensidige NOR
- Headquarters: Oslo, Norway
- Key people: Kjell O. Kran (CEO)

Union Bank of Norway branded as Sparebanken NOR was Norway's largest savings bank between 1990 and 1999. The bank was created as a merger between Sparebanken ABC and four other regional savings banks. The new bank had its headquarters in Oslo and was in existence until 1999 when it merged with Gjensidige to form Gjensidige NOR. Today the bank is part of DnB NOR.

The bank was primarily concentrated around Eastern Norway where the original five banks had branches in Akershus, Buskerud, Oslo, Vestfold, and Østfold in addition to offices in Bergen, Bodø, Kristiansand, Tromsø, Trondheim and Vadsø in addition to Luxembourg.
