= Den norske Creditbank =

Defunct Norwegian commercial bank

- Industry: Banking
- Founded: 1857
- Defunct: 1990
- Fate: Merged
- Successor: Den norske Bank
- Headquarters: Oslo, Norway

Den norske Creditbank or DnC is a defunct Norwegian commercial bank created in 1857. In 1990 it merged with Bergen Bank to create Den norske Bank (DnB). The bank was based in Oslo and listed on the Oslo Stock Exchange.

== History ==
During the 1960s and ’70s, the bank bought and merged with a number of regional and local banks in Norway, including Odda By- og Bygdebank (1964), Porsgrunds Ørebank (1964), Røkens Bank (1964), Oplandske Kreditbank (1966), Horten og Omegns Privatbank (1970), Privatbanken i Sandefjord (1970), Østfold Privatbank (1970), Finnmarkens Privatbank (1973), Haugesunds Forretningsbank (1973), and Opplandsbanken (1980).

During the 1980s, DnC had expanded significantly both in Norway and internationally, and was Norway's largest bank at the time. During the bank crisis the bank suffered severe losses and in an effort to save the bank it succeeded in merging with Bergen Bank, Norway's third largest bank.
