= Association of Norwegian Insurance Companies =

The Association of Norwegian Insurance Companies (Norwegian: Norges Forsikringsforbund) was an employers' organisation in Norway.

It was established in 1937, but in 2000 it was merged with the Norwegian Bankers' Association to form the Norwegian Financial Services Association. It was named Norske Forsikringsselskapers Forbund between 1937 and 1943, and 1945 to 1980.
