= Gjensidige NOR =

Defunct Norwegian bank and insurance company

Gjensidige NOR ASA
- Industry: Financial services
- Founded: 1999
- Defunct: 2003
- Fate: Merged
- Successor: DnB NOR; Gjensidige
- Headquarters: Oslo, Norway

Gjensidige NOR was a Norwegian bank and insurance company that was in existence between 1999 and 2003. The company was created when the two savings banks Sparebanken NOR (bank) and Gjensidige (insurance) were merged in 1999. In 2002 Norwegian savings banks were allowed to become public limited company and was listed on the Oslo Stock Exchange. In 2003 the company was merged with Den norske Bank to form DnB NOR, while the original insurance company Gjensidige was demerged and again became a separate company in 2005.

When the company was made a public limited company, a foundation was created to own part of the corporation, which still exists as Sparebankstiftelsen DnB NOR and owns 10.95% of DnB NOR. After the demerger, Gjensidige became a self-owning institution.
