= Finance Norway =

Organization of Norway

- Formation: 2010
- Legal status: Organisation
- Purpose: Finance industry in Norway
- Headquarters: Hansteens gate 2, Oslo
- Region served: Norway
- Members: 200+ Norwegian banks, insurance companies and other financial institutions
- Managing director: Idar Kreutzer
- Website: www.fno.no

Finance Norway (Norwegian: Finans Norge) is the industry organisation for the financial industry in Norway. Finance Norway represents more than 200 financial companies with around 50,000 employees.

It was established on 1 January 2010 as a cooperation organization between the Norwegian Financial Services Association (Norwegian: Finansnæringens Hovedorganisasjon) and the Norwegian Savings Banks Association (Norwegian: Sparebankforeningen). These organizations still exist, but not their respective "service offices", whose tasks were taken over by Finance Norway.

Idar Kreutzer is managing director at Finans Norge. The headquarters are at Hansteens gate 2, Oslo.
