= DNB Bank =

Largest bank in Norway

Coordinates: 59°54′35.08″N 10°43′32.12″E

DNB Bank ASA
- Company type: Allmennaksjeselskap
- Traded as: OSE: DNB
- Industry: Financial services
- Founded: 1822; 204 years ago
- Headquarters: Oslo, Norway
- Area served: Northern-Europe
- Key people: Kjerstin Braathen (CEO), Olaug Svarva (Chairman)
- Products: Banking and insurance
- Brands: DNB; Sbanken
- Revenue: ▲NOK 86.537 billion (end 2024)
- Net income: ▲NOK 45.804 billion (end 2024)
- Total assets: ▲NOK 4.350 trillion (end 2024)
- Total equity: ▲NOK 283.325 billion (end 2024)
- Owner: Norwegian government (34 %); Sparebankstiftelsen DNB (9 %) As of June 2016
- Number of employees: 11,047 (average, 2015)
- Subsidiaries: Cresco
- Website: dnb.no

DNB Bank ASA (formerly DnB NOR ASA) is Norway's largest financial services group, with total combined assets of more than NOK 3.6 trillion and a market capitalisation NOK 400 billion as of 2024. DNB's head office is located in Oslo.

The two largest owners of DNB are the Royal Norwegian Ministry of Trade, Industry and Fisheries (34.0%) and Sparebankstiftelsen DNB (10.0%). The latter was created as a foundation with the sole purpose of owning a part of the company. It was created when Gjensidige NOR was made a public limited company to ensure that the company's customers retained partial ownership of the company. The foundation can also give up to 25% of its received dividend as gifts to charity.

== Operations ==
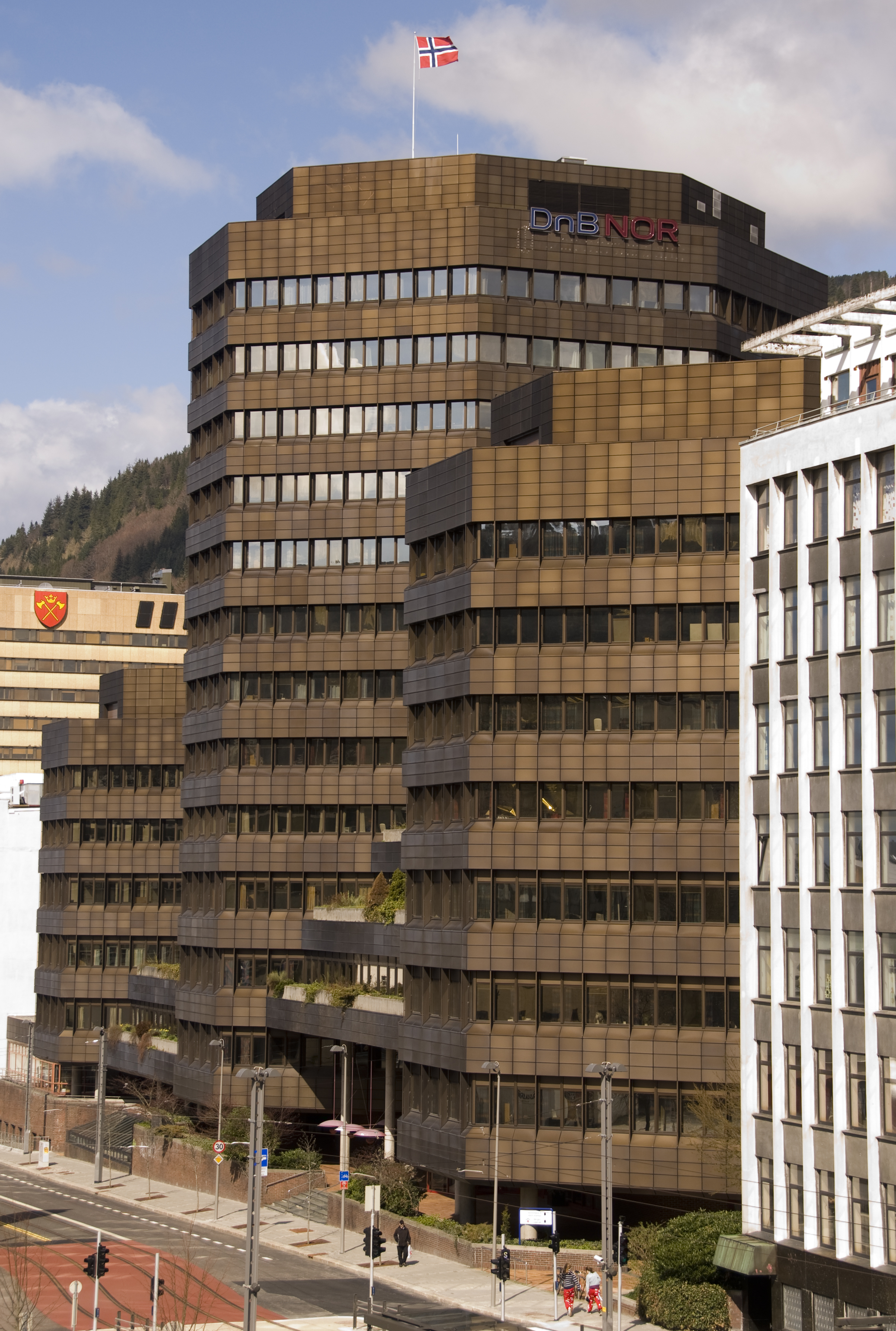
DnB NOR offices in Bergen until December 2013

The DNB Bank Group is the largest entity in the DNB Group and Norway's largest bank, offering services to the corporate, retail, and securities markets and the public sector. Domestically, the group has an investment bank, DNB Markets, the finance company Cresco, the real estate agency DNB Eiendom and DNB Asset Management, which operates as a fund manager for institutional clients in Norway and Sweden. DNB has the largest customer base in the Norwegian financial market. In Norway, DNB has more than 2.3 million retail customers and more than 200,000 corporate clients, with 61 branch offices.

The group's activities are primarily focused on Norway; however, it is one of the world's foremost shipping banks and a major international player in the energy sector. It has an international network of 27 branches and representative offices, including Helsinki (Finland), Copenhagen (Denmark), Hamburg (Germany), Luxembourg, London (United Kingdom), New York (United States), Houston (United States), Rio de Janeiro (Brazil), Santiago (Chile), Shanghai (China) and Singapore. The company also has multiple offices in Sweden.

In Denmark, Finland, Poland, Estonia, Latvia and Lithuania DNB used to market itself as DnB NORD in what was initially a joint venture with the German bank Norddeutsche Landesbank with DNB owning a full stake since December 23, 2010. On November 11, 2011, the bank was rebranded and adopted the common DNB brand throughout these countries. In these countries, DNB has 930,000 customers and 163 branch offices.

== History ==
The history of the group goes back to 1822, with the establishment of Christiania Sparebank. The present corporation consists of mergers between Christiania Sparebank (1822), Gjensidige (1847), Bergens Privatbank (1855), Den norske Creditbank (1857), Fellesbanken (1920), Bergens Kreditbank (1928), Postbanken, Vital and Nordlandsbanken. The name DnB NOR was adopted in 2003, when the two banks Den norske Bank (DnB) and Gjensidige NOR were merged. The company changed its legal name and brand to DNB in November 2011.

In August 2017, DNB and Nordea combined their operations in Estonia, Latvia, and Lithuania to create Luminor Bank.

In October 2024, DNB agreed to buy Carnegie, a Swedish investment bank and asset manager, for $1.14 billion in an all-cash acquisition.

== See also ==
- List of oldest companies, which includes Gjensidige NOR
