= Den norske Bank =

Norwegian bank

- Industry: Banking
- Founded: 1990
- Defunct: 1999
- Fate: Merged
- Successor: DnB NOR
- Headquarters: Bergen, Norway
- Products: Postbanken, Cresco, American Express
- Parent: Norwegian Ministry of Finance

Den norske Bank or DnB was a Norwegian bank that existed between 1990 and 2003 when it merged with Gjensidige NOR to form DnB NOR (now DNB ASA). The bank's headquarters were in Bergen, Norway.

DnB was created as a merger between Bergen Bank and Den norske Creditbank in 1990 after a major downturn in the economy, especially affecting the banks, who lost vast amounts of money due to misheld loans and falling housing prices. The state held a majority ownership in the bank in addition to its being listed on the Oslo Stock Exchange. In 1996, DnB bought Vital Forsikring and in 1999 it merged with Postbanken. From 2011, DnB NOR changed its name to DNB. The cost of the change was estimated at between NOK 150 and 170 million.
