= Gjensidige =

Norwegian insurance company

Gjensidige Forsikring ASA
- Company type: Allmennaksjeselskap
- Traded as: OSE: GJF
- Industry: Financial services
- Founded: 1923
- Headquarters: Oslo, Norway
- Area served: Norway, Denmark and Sweden
- Key people: Geir Holmgren (CEO), Inge Hansen (Chairman)
- Products: Insurance, pensions, savings, online banking
- Revenue: NOK 24.16 billion (2015)
- Net income: NOK 3.785 billion (2015)
- Total assets: NOK 129.264 billion (end 2015)
- Total equity: NOK 23.3 billion (end 2015)
- Number of employees: 3,908 (end 2015)
- Subsidiaries: Gjensidige Bank, Gjensidige Pensjon og Sparing
- Website: www.gjensidige.com (Corporate) www.gjensidige.no (Norway) www.gjensidige.se (Sweden) www.gjensidige.dk (Denmark)

Gjensidige Forsikring ASA is a Norwegian insurance company. The company traces its roots back to 1816 when a fire mutual was founded as Land Gjensidige Brandkasse in what is today Innlandet county. Gjensidige demutualised and listed on the Oslo Stock Exchange in December 2010. The firm, headquartered in Oslo, has a market share of some 26% (2021) in the Norwegian insurance market. The company has 36 branch offices in Norway, not including affiliated fire mutuals, and 1 million customers. Gjensidige has subsidiaries in Denmark and Sweden.

The company offers all kinds of insurance for retail customers, agriculture and business. It also offers pensions and savings products.

== History ==
Although the company traces its roots back to 1816, the brand name Gjensidige originates from the life insurance company Christiania almindelige gjensidige forsørgelsesanstalt that was established in 1847. In the early 1970s the p&c-company traded under the name Samtrygd, whereas the life insurance company had simplified its name to Gjensidige Liv. The two companies formed a strategic alliance in 1976, adopting Gjensidige as a joint brand name, but as both companies were mutually owned they did not merge.

In 1992 Gjensidige acquired Forenede Forsikring and in 1993 Gjensidige Bank was created with banking services. In 1999 Gjensidige and the savings bank Sparebanken NOR created the Gjensidige NOR-group. The Group was a strategic alliance between mutually owned companies. When Gjensidige NOR merged with Den norske Bank in 2003 to form DnB NOR, Gjensidige Forsikring remained an independent company.

In 2007 Gjensidige acquired shares in Storebrand, and for some time held the position as the number one shareholder with 24.33% of the stock. The entire shareholding was sold in 2014.

In 2010 Gjensidige demutualised and was listed on the Oslo Stock Exchange. The Gjensidige Foundation is the largest owner with some 62 percent of the shares.

== See also ==
- List of oldest companies
