= Harald Astrup =

Norwegian businessman

Harald Sigurdssøn Astrup
- Born: 29 May 1903
- Died: 22 June 1983 (aged 80)
- Burial place: Ullern
- Occupations: Businessman; Owner of Astrup & Søn; Supervisory council member of Den norske Creditbank, Dyno Industrier, Norcem, the Norwegian America Line and Bjølvefossen
- Years active: 1926-1971
- Board member of: Storebrand; Idun; Christiania Søforsikringsselskab; Poseidon; Norwegian Museum of Decorative Arts and Design; Det Norske Selskab
- Spouse: Mabel Anette Plathe Butenschøn (m. 1928)
- Parent(s): Sigurd Astrup (father); Ingeborg Willumsen (mother)
- Relatives: Barthold A. Butenschøn (brother-in-law); Barthold A. Butenschøn Sr. (father-in-law); Eivind (uncle); Thorvald Astrup (uncle)

Harald Sigurdssøn Astrup (29 May 1903 – 22 June 1983) was a Norwegian businessperson.

He was born in Kristiania as a son of politician Sigurd Astrup (1873–1949) and Ingeborg Willumsen (1877–1962). He was named after his paternal grandfather (Harald Astrup, also a businessman), and was a nephew of Henning, Eivind and Thorvald Astrup. In 1928 he married Mabel Anette Plathe Butenschøn, a sister of Barthold A. Butenschøn and daughter of Barthold A. Butenschøn Sr.

He finished his secondary education in 1922, and was a travelling businessman in Norway and abroad until being hired in the family company Astrup & Søn in 1926. He advanced to office manager in 1931, partner in 1936 and sole owner in 1949; he also served as chairman. He was a board member of the insurance companies Storebrand, Idun, Christiania Søforsikringsselskab and Poseidon, and was a supervisory council member of Den norske Creditbank, Dyno Industrier, Norcem, the Norwegian America Line and Bjølvefossen. He was a board member of the Norwegian Museum of Decorative Arts and Design and honorary member of Det Norske Selskab, which he had chaired from 1960 to 1968.

He retired in 1971. He died in June 1983 and was buried in Ullern.
