= Henning Thorvaldssøn Astrup =

Norwegian architect (1904–1983)

Henning Astrup
- Born: 21 February 1904; Kristiania, Norway
- Died: 7 August 1983 (aged 79)
- Occupation: Architect
- Parent: Thorvald Astrup
- Relatives: Eivind Astrup (uncle); Sigurd Astrup (uncle); Henning Astrup (uncle); Peter Andreas Morell (uncle)

Henning Thorvaldssøn Astrup (21 February 1904 – 7 August 1983) was a Norwegian architect.

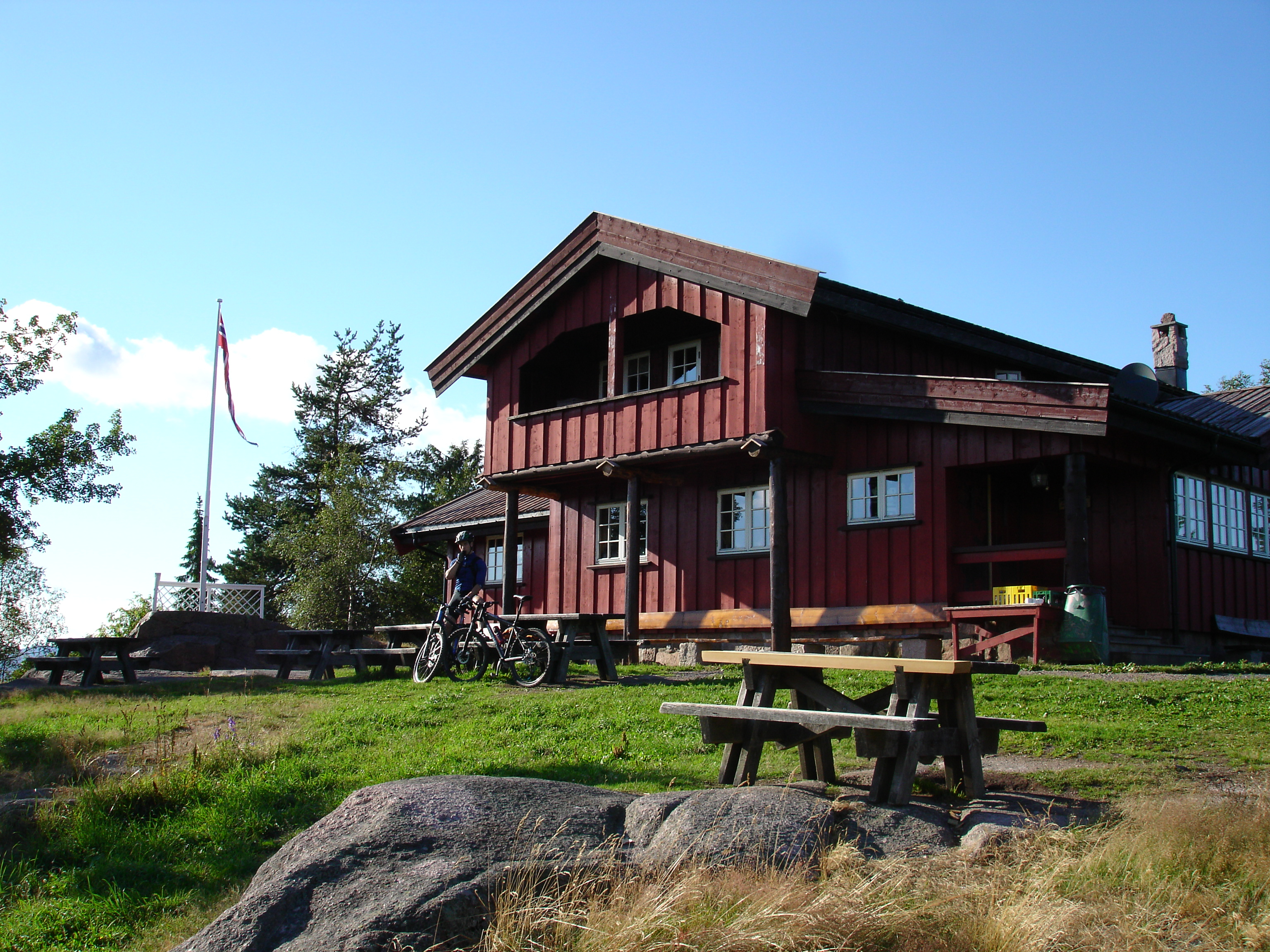
Skjennungstua in Nordmarka

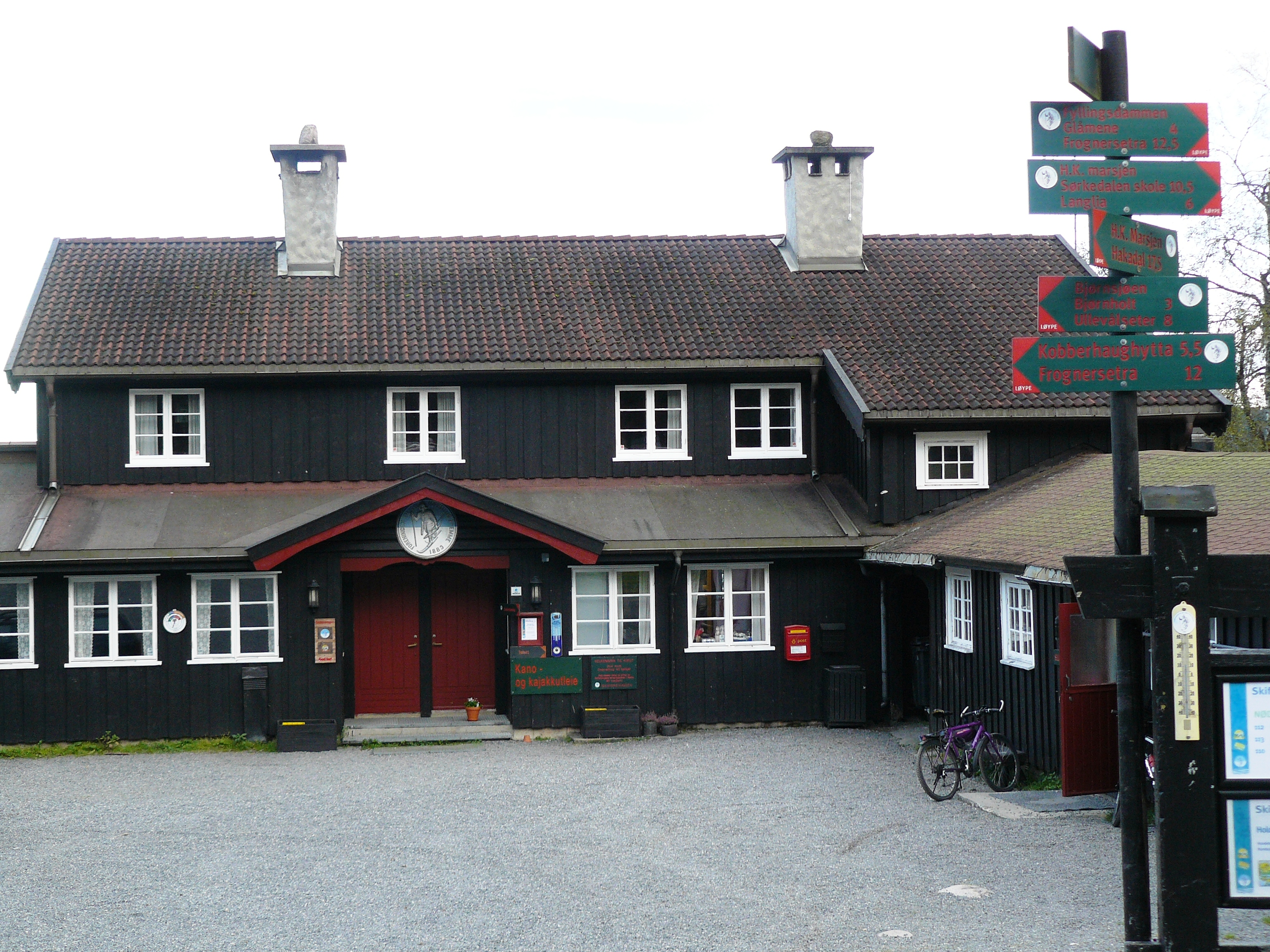
Kikutstua in Nordmarka

He was born in Kristiania (now Oslo), Norway to architect Thorvald Astrup and Alfhild Ebbesen. He was a nephew of Arctic explorer Eivind, architect Henning, merchant Sigurd Astrup, and politician Peter Andreas Morell.

Astrup graduated from the Norwegian Institute of Technology in 1927. From 1932 Henning Astrup worked in partnership with his father, Thorvald Astrup. Among his designs were industrial buildings for Norsk Hydro at Herøya, Rjukan, Notodden, Glomfjord and Kykkelsrud. He also designed the lodging facilities Skjennungstua and Kikutstua in Nordmarka and Skeikampen in Gausdal Municipality.
