= Sverre Walter Rostoft =

Norwegian politician

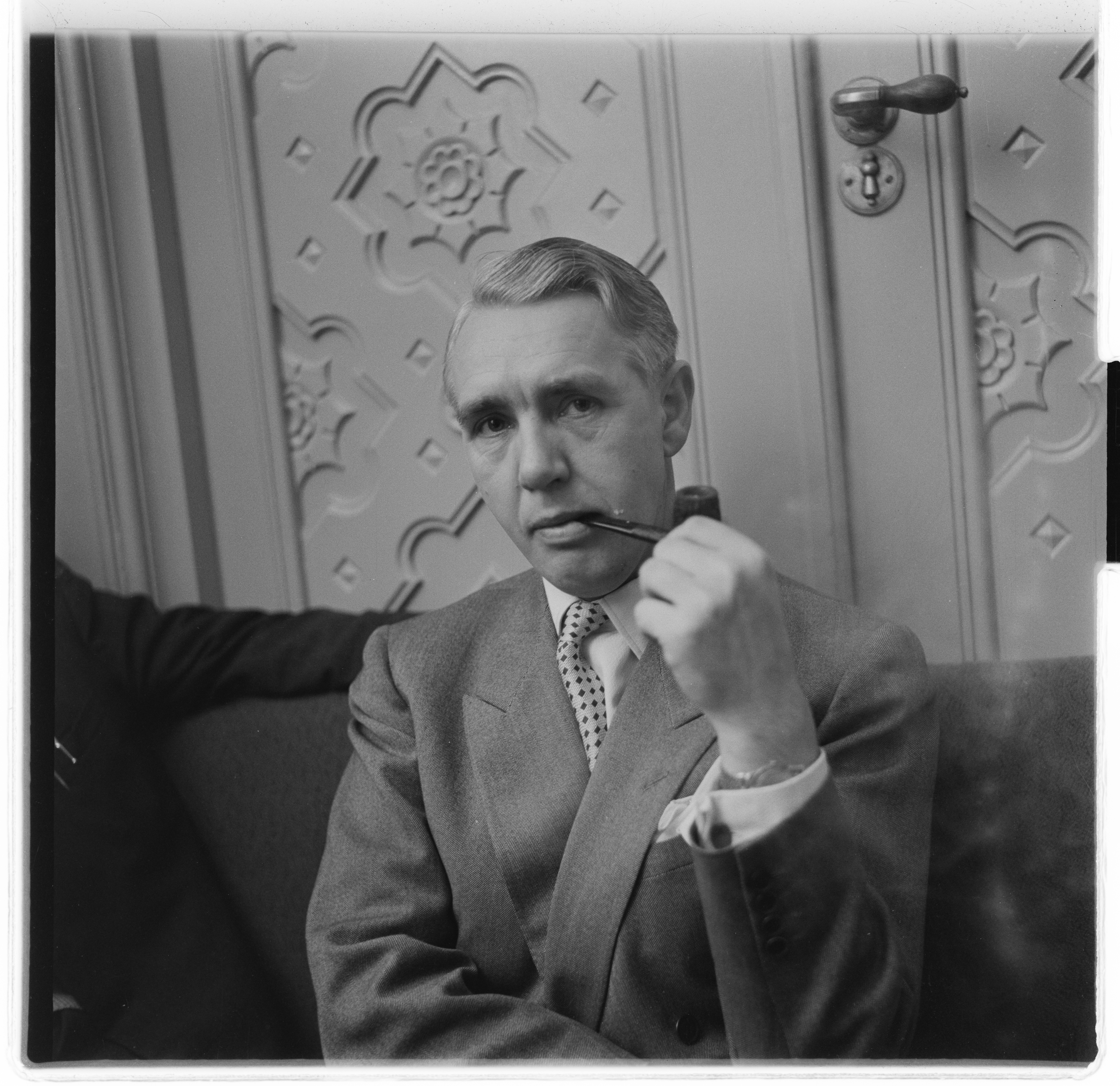

Sverre Walter Rostoft (12 December 1912 – 26 April 2001) was a Norwegian businessperson and politician for the Conservative Party.

== Early life and education ==
He was born in Glemmen as a son of ship captain Georg Walter Andersen (1887–1952) and housewife Marta Walgjerta Hansen. He took commerce school in 1930 and the examen artium in 1935. He studied philology from 1935 to 1937, then worked as a secretary at Nylands Verksted until 1944. In 1947 he graduated with the cand.jur. degree.

== Career ==
He was hired as an office manager in Kristiansands Mekaniske Verksted in 1944. Already in 1945 he became chief executive officer, serving until 1979. He became a board member of the Federation of Norwegian Manufacturing Industries in 1949 and the Federation of Norwegian Industries in 1957. He served as president from 1962 to 1965.

Rostoft chaired the local Rotary club from 1949 to 1950. He was elected to Oddernes municipal council and served from 1951 to 1955. Other public posts in this period include board memberships of Kristiansand Port Authority from 1952 and Vest-Agder Elektrisitetsverk from 1954 (chair).

He was elected to the Parliament of Norway from Vest-Agder in 1953, lost his seat in 1957 but was later re-elected in 1965. Following the 1965 election, however, he was appointed Minister of Industry in the centre-right Borten's Cabinet. He held the position until Borten's Cabinet fell in 1971, and thus his seat in parliament was taken by Kolbjørn Stordrange the entire term (until 1969). Rostoft was also a central board member of the Conservative Party from 1954 to 1970.

He held a wide range of other positions. In education and culture he was a council member of NTNF from 1963 to 1965 and Agder District College and board member of the Norwegian Church Academies. He chaired the companies Oil Industry Services, Norske Folk, UNI Forsikring, Siemens Norge and Christianssands Bryggeri. He was a board member of Kristiansand Jernstøperi (1947–c.1965), Forsikringsselskapet Norrøna (1953–1972), Morgenbladet (1954–), Hunsfos Fabrikker (1961–1971), Norske Shell (1972–1982) and Strømmen Staal. He chaired the supervisory council of Hunsfos Fabrikker (1971–1972), was vice chair in Sagapart (1973–1979) and supervisory council member of Den norske Creditbank (1963–1965), Forsikringsselskapet Viking, Hypotekforeningen for næringslivet, and Storebrand.

He was decorated as a Knight, First Class of the Order of St. Olav in 1965, Commander of the Order of the Dannebrog in 1973 and received the Grand Cross of the Order of Merit of the Federal Republic of Germany in 1987.

Business positions
Preceded by A. Monrad-Aas	President of the Federation of Norwegian Industries; 1962–1965	Succeeded by Nils Fredrik Aall
Political offices
Preceded by Karl Trasti	Norwegian Minister of Industry; 1965–1971	Succeeded by Finn Lied
