= Tjersland =

Tjersland is a Norwegian surname. Notable people with the surname include:

- Alf Tjersland (1881–1955), Norwegian engineer and businessman
- Arne Tjersland (1924–2015), Norwegian politician
- Odd Arne Tjersland (born 1947), Norwegian psychologist
