= Sigurd Astrup =

Norwegian businessman and politician

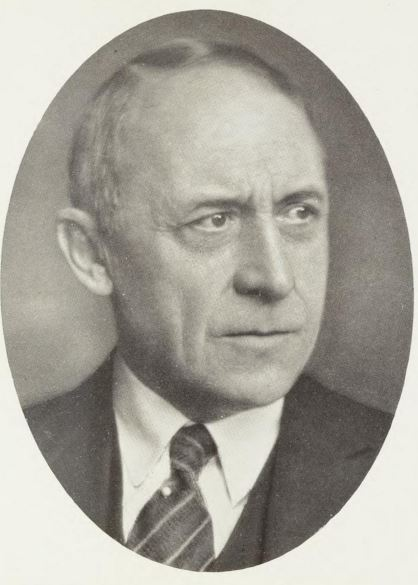
- Sigurd Astrup
- Born: 6 August 1873; Oslo, Norway
- Died: August 1949 (aged 76)
- Occupations: Businessman; Owner of Astrup & Søn; Supervisory council member of Filharmonisk Selskap; Politician
- Years active: 1895-1949
- Title: Parliament member
- Term: 1924-1928
- Political party: Conservative Party
- Board member of: Statens metalsentral (1918–1920); Norges Handels- og Sjøfartstidende (1917 to 1933); Standards Norway (1924-1934); Christiania Søforsikringsselskab (1932-1944); Norsk Spisevognselskap; Grubernes Sprængstoffabriker; Dalen Portland; Den norske Creditbank (1928-1944); Storebrand; Idun 1931-1946; Elektrokemisk
- Spouse: Ingeborg Willumsen
- Children: Harald Astrup
- Parent: Harald Astrup
- Relatives: Eivind Astrup (brother); Thorvald Astrup (brother); Henning Astrup (brother); Peder Andreas Morell (brother-in-law)

Sigurd Astrup (6 August 1873 – August 1949) was a Norwegian businessman and politician for the Conservative Party.

== Personal life ==
Astrup was born in Kristiania, the son of Harald Astrup (1831–1914), a wholesaler, and his wife, Johanne Emilie Smith (1836–1915). His brothers were the architects Henning (1864–96) and Thorvald Astrup (1876–1940) and the polar explorer Eivind Astrup (1871–95). He was a brother-in-law of fellow conservative politician Peder Andreas Morell. He was married to Ingeborg Willumsen (1877–1962); their son Harald Astrup married Mabel, a sister of Barthold A. Butenschøn, Sr. and, like his father, embarked on a mercantile career.

== Career ==
The young Astrup was educated at the private Gjertsen School in Kristiania, before embarking on his philological and mercantile studies in England and Belgium. In 1895, the company Astrup & Smith, founded by his father on 6 August 1857, appointed Astrup as its office chief. He became part owner in 1906. The company subsequently changed name from Astrup & Smith to Astrup & Søn. Astrup became the sole owner of the company in 1914.

Representing the Oslo Conservative Party, Astrup was elected to the Parliament of Norway in 1924; he sat through one term. Astrup also had positions in parliamentary committees, in Statens metalsentral (1918–1920) and in boards of Norwegian corporations. He chaired Standards Norway from 1924 to 1934 and Christiania Søforsikringsselskab from 1932 to 1944, as well as Norsk Spisevognselskap, Grubernes Sprængstoffabriker and Dalen Portland. He was a board member of Norges Handels- og Sjøfartstidende from 1917 to 1933, Den norske Creditbank from 1928 to 1944 (deputy chairman since 1932), Storebrand and Idun from 1931 to 1946, as well as Elektrokemisk. He was also a supervisory council member of Filharmonisk Selskap. He died in August 1949, aged 76.
