= Kristoffer Stensrud =

Norwegian businessman (1953–2021)

Kristoffer Stensrud (1953 – 18 September 2021) was one of Skagen Funds founders. He served as managing director from 1993 to 2001 and Investment Director from 2002 to 2007. He was also the portfolio manager of the SKAGEN Kon-Tiki equity fund. Kristoffer Stensrud was born in 1953 in Trondheim, Norway. He studied financial planning and monetary policy at the Copenhagen Business School. He began his career as chief analyst (1979–1983) at Børsinformation ApS in Copenhagen and later became portfolio manager (1983–1985) with Børsinformation I.R. (UK). In 1985, he joined Stafonds (later SR-Fonds) as an analyst for four years and later joined Carnegie-Jensen in Copenhagen in 1990 as a chief analyst. In 1993, Kristoffer founded SKAGEN Funds. The fund he was portfolio manager for, the Skagen Kon-Tiki fund, was launched by Kristoffer Stensrud in 2002. He applied a bottom-up approach, focusing on picking high quality companies with a low price tag or companies that are undervalued and unpopular. Kristoffer Stensrud was triple-A-rated by Citywire and his Kon-Tiki fund is triple-A-rated by Standard & Poor's. Stensrud was awarded CIO of the year in 2007.
