= Andreas Fredrik Falkenberg =

Norwegian engineer, businessperson and politician

Andreas Fredrik Falkenberg (13 March 1875 – 1957) is a Norwegian engineer, businessperson and politician for the Conservative Party.

He was born in Bergen as a son of school headmaster Andreas Fredrik Falkenberg (1842–1875) and Anne Marie Wathne (1848–1922). He attended Bergen Cathedral School. In 1893 he graduated from Bergen Technical School, and in 1895 from the electrotechnical school Montefiore Institute in Liège. In 1898 he married photographer's daughter Anna Dorothea von der Fehr.

In 1897 he was hired as a manager in Bergen's Electric Tramway. In 1914 he moved to Eastern Norway to hold the same position in Oslo Tramway, and from 1924 to 1940 he was the chief executive of Bærumsbanen.

He was an elected member of Bergen city council from 1908 to 1913, the first term in the executive committee. From 1909 to 1910 he chaired the local Conservative party branch. He chaired Norske Elektrisitetsverkers Forening from 1918 to 1921, the Norwegian Polytechnic Society from 1918 to 1922, Kongelig Norsk Motorbåtforbund from 1920 to 1923 and Kongelig Norsk Automobilklub from 1933 to 1940.

He was decorated as a Knight, First Class of the Order of Vasa. He died in 1957.

Non-profit organization positions
Preceded by Thomas Norberg Schulz	Chairman of the Norwegian Polytechnic Society; 1918–1922	Succeeded by Bjarne Nissen
