= Carl Schulz =

Norwegian educator and politician

Carl Schulz (12 November 1851 – 15 August 1944) was a Norwegian educator and politician for the Liberal Party. He became known as a teacher of physics, electrotechnics and mineralogy before advancing to being school director.

== Personal life ==
He was born in Trondheim as a son of attorney Laurentius Andreas Schulz and Christiane Wilhelmine Ulich. His grandfather was a German immigrant. He was a brother of educator Thomas Norberg Schulz, and thus a granduncle of architect Christian Norberg-Schulz and great-granduncle of opera singer Elizabeth Norberg-Schulz. In July 1889 in Trondhjem he married shipmaster's daughter Gudrun Boye (1866–1953). He died in August 1944 in Trondhjem, aged 92.

== Career ==
He finished his secondary education at Trondhjem Cathedral School in 1871, studied philology for one and a half-year and then the sciences. He graduated with the cand.real. degree in 1877, and worked in Ås and Tromsø until May 1878. He was then hired as a teacher at Trondhjem Cathedral School. He also worked at a middle school in the city. In September 1893 he was hired as a teacher of physics, applied physics, electrotechnics and mineralogy at Trondhjem Technical School. He worked two jobs until being let go (following his own request) from Trondhjem Cathedral School in June 1894. Electrotechnics in particular was a new field, so he had to be an autodidact, with several study trips to continental Europe. He wrote the textbook Grundtræk af elektrotekniken in 1909. Trondhjem Technical School went through organizational changes in the 1910s, and Schulz was the school's director from July 1917 to his retirement in 1926.

He represented the Liberal Party in Trondhjem city council from 1902 to 1904, and participated in the planning of an electricity works at Lerfossen. He collected minerals for the Royal Norwegian Society of Sciences and Letters, managing their mineral collection from 1878 to 1936, and also donated some to Trondhjem Cathedral School. He also spent much spare time working for the trekking cause. A well-known tourist cabin in Sylan bears his name. He was an honorary member (1937) of the local Polytechnic Society, and was awarded the King's Medal of Merit in 1925.
