= Bjarne Nissen =

Norwegian brewer (1869–1950)

Bjarne Nissen (18 September 1869 – 1950) was a Norwegian brewer.

He was born in Kristiania. He took his education as a chemical engineer at Kristiania Technical School, in German locations Charlottenburg (Berlin) and Munich, as well as Copenhagen, Denmark. He worked for one and a half year at Vestfos Cellulosefabrik before being hired at Frydenlunds Bryggeri. In 1904, he was promoted to factory manager.

He chaired the Norwegian Polytechnic Society from 1922 to 1926. He was a board member of Elektrisk Bureau from 1926 to 1934, Greaker Cellulosefabrik from 1932 and Kongelig Norsk Automobilklub (later chairing its supervisory council). He was also a member of the Labour Court and the Oslo Stock Exchange Arbitration Tribunal.

Non-profit organization positions
| Preceded by Andreas Fredrik Falkenberg | Chairman of the Norwegian Polytechnic Society; 1922–1926 | Succeeded by Andreas Baalsrud |
