= Thomas Norberg Schulz =

Norwegian engineer

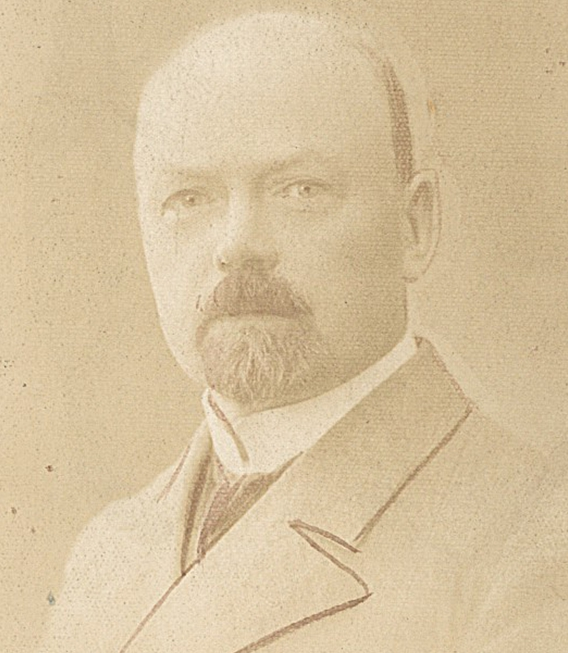
Thomas Norberg Schulz's Portrait

Thomas Norberg Schulz (12 July 1866 – 28 May 1950) was a Norwegian engineer.

He was born in Trondhjem as a son of attorney Laurentius Andreas Schulz and Christiane Wilhelmine Ulich. He was a brother of educator Carl Schulz. In February 1897 in Strinda Municipality he married Gustava Kielland Bachke, a daughter of Anton Sophus Bachke. He was a grandfather of architect Christian Norberg-Schulz, and thus great-grandfather of opera singer Elizabeth Norberg-Schulz. He died in May 1950 in Oslo.

He took exams at Trondhjem Technical School in 1884 and 1885, and graduated from Technische Hochschule in Charlottenburg (now Technische Universität Berlin) in electrical engineering in 1888. In between he worked at Elektrisk Bureau from 1886 to 1887 and 1889 to 1891. He was a manager of Kristiania Elektrisitetsverk from 1891, having been hired at the age of twenty-five, and was then the chief executive officer from 1908 to 1920. He was the director of electricity in the Norwegian Water Resources and Electricity Agency from 1920 to 1933.

He was a co-founder and first chairman, from 1901 to 1915, of Norske Elektrisitetsverkers Forening and became an honorary member there in 1926. Internationally he was an honorary vice president of the International Council on Large Electric Systems from 1921. He chaired the Norwegian Polytechnic Society from 1915 to 1918, wrote several technical-academical works and was elected to the Norwegian Academy of Science and Letters in 1928. He was also a board member of Freia Chocolade Fabrik from 1904 to 1939 and Statens metalcentral.

Preceded by Ernst Simonsen	Chairman of the Norwegian Polytechnic Society; 1915–1918	Succeeded by Andreas Falkenberg
