= Statens metalcentral =

20th-century Norwegian organization

Statens metalcentral (the Metal Central of the State) was a distribution organization in Norway.

It was created by Royal Resolution (i.e. by the King in Council) on 15 February 1918, as Norway faced the First World War's hardships of industrial import and export. It was to distribute metals except for steel and iron, mostly copper. It was subordinate to the Ministry of Industrial Provisioning. Chairman of the organization was Sigurd Astrup. The other members were Per Kure, T. Norberg-Schulz, Alf Tjersland, Holm Holmsen, Per Mortensen and lastly the state's representative, Colonel W. H. Færden.

It was discontinued on 5 March 1920. It was the last of the Ministry of Industrial Provisioning's industrial centrals created during the war. The Ministry of Industrial Provisioning was itself closed later in 1920.
