= Harald Astrup (born 1831) =

Norwegian businessman

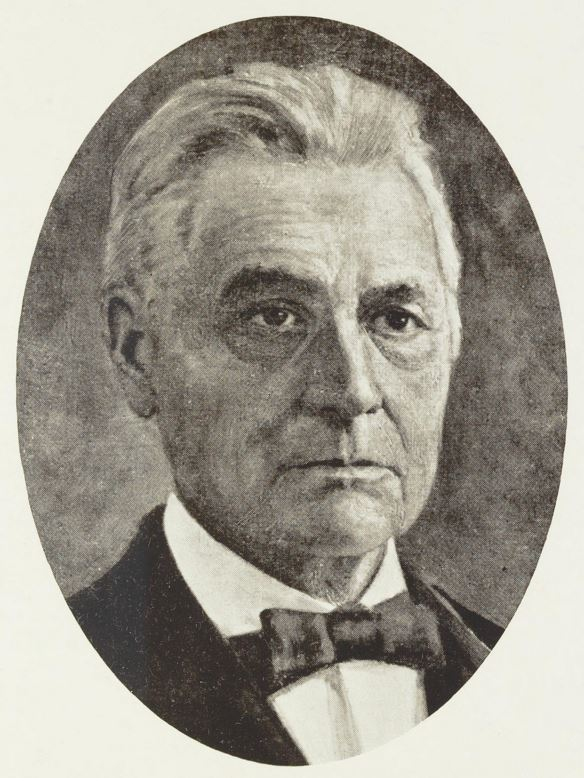
- Henning Astrup
- Born: 12 May 1831; Larvik, Norway
- Died: 1914 (aged 82–83)
- Occupation: Wholesaler
- Children: Henning Astrup (1864–1896); Eivind Astrup (1871–1895); Sigurd Astrup [1873–1949); Thorvald Astrup (1876–1940)
- Relatives: Peter Andreas Morell (son-in-law)

Harald Henningsen Astrup (Norwegian: [ˈhɑ̀ːrɑɫ ˈɑ̂strʉp]; 12 May 1831 – 1914) was a Norwegian businessman, wholesaler, and city official.

== Biography ==
Astrup was born at Larvik in Vestfold to Henning Martin Astrup (1788–1845) and his wife Maren Dorthea Lorbauer (1791–1885).

Astrup later settled in Christiania (now Oslo) where he received a trade education with merchant H. F. Løkke. In 1857 he established the firm of Astrup & Smith (now Astrup AS) together with Carl Dührendahl Smith (1834–66), who was the wife's brother. The firm initially manufactured clothing. In 1865, the firm moved into the wholesale business. By 1868, the business concentrated on supplies for the shipbuilding industry later to be expanded to supplying steam ships and railway. In 1906 his son Sigurd Astrup joined the firm as co-owner and became sole owner in 1914.

From 1874 to 1877 he served as Christiania city councilman (stadshauptmann) with responsibility for the city's civilian defense. In 1875, Astrup was decorated Knight of the Swedish Order of Vasa.

== Personal life ==
In 1861, he married Emilie Johanne Smith (1836–1915). Their daughter Hanna (1869–1933) was married to politician Peter Andreas Morell. They were also the parents of architects Henning Astrup (1864–1896) and Thorvald Astrup (1876–1940), Arctic explorer Eivind Astrup (1871–1895) and member of Parliament Sigurd Astrup (1873–1949). Astrup was the paternal grandfather of Harald Astrup (born 1903), likewise a businessman. He died in 1914.

He is buried at a family grave in the Cemetery of Our Saviour.
