= Kontraskjæret =

Park in Oslo, Norway

Coordinates: 59.9102°N 10.7367°E

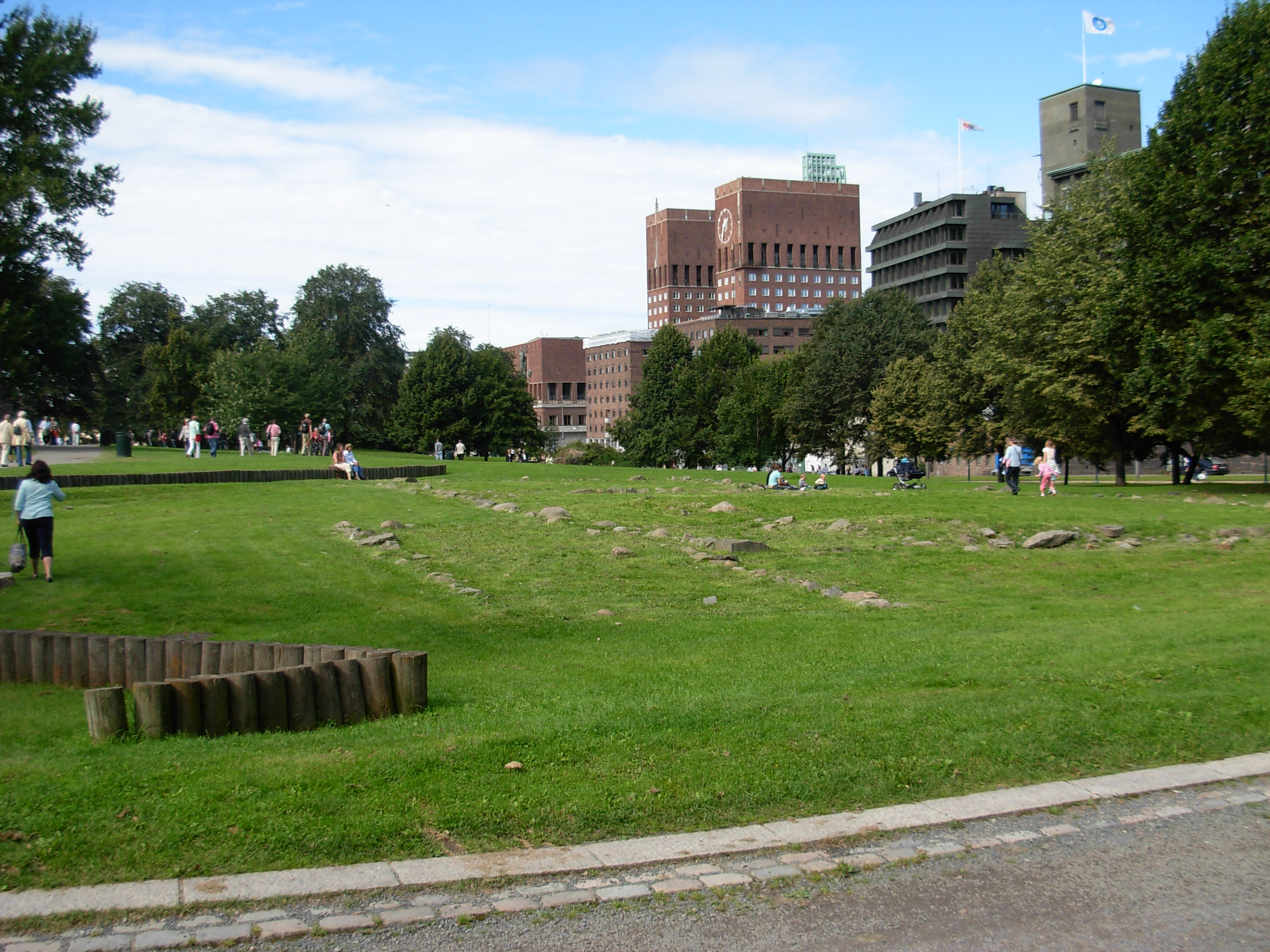
Kontraskjæret in 2007

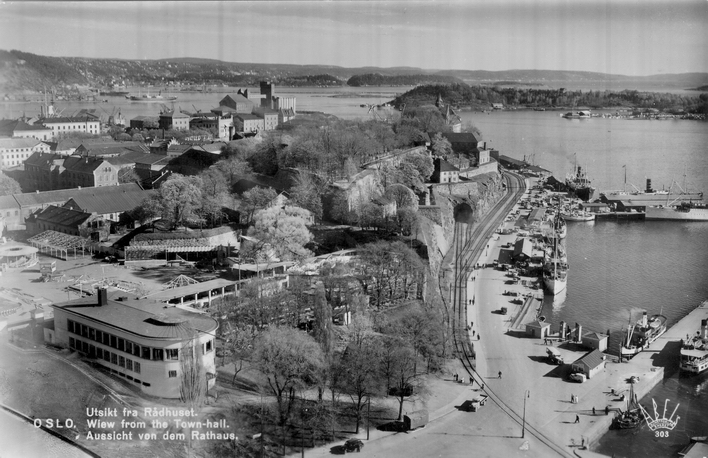
View from Oslo City Hall. The restaurant Skansen (left) was built at Kontraskjæret in 1927.

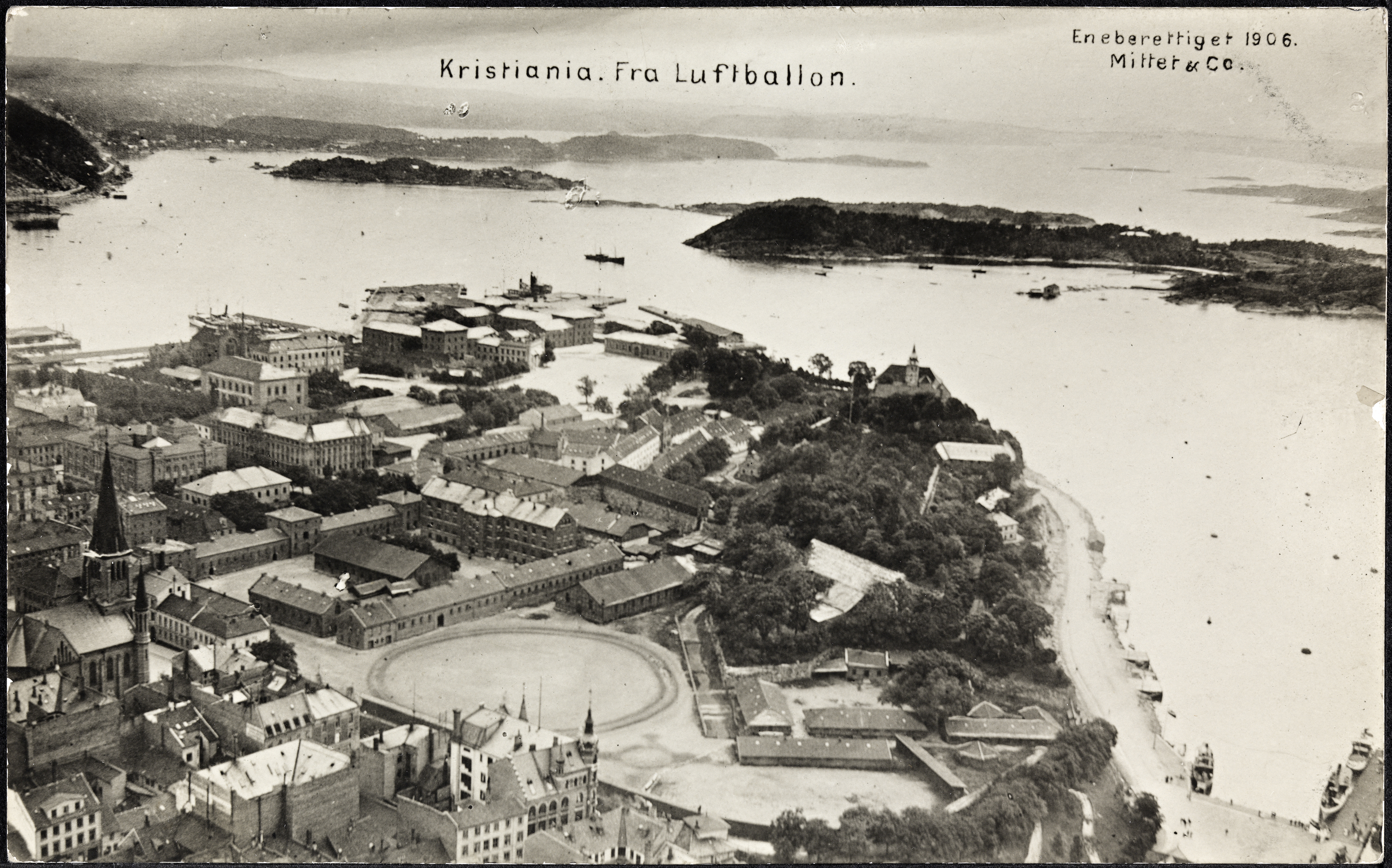
Akershus Fortress and Kontraskjæret, viewed from balloon in 1906

Kontraskjæret is an area in Oslo, Norway.

== History ==
Kontraskjæret is proximate to the Akershus Fortress, and was the location for outworks for Escarpe du Nord (Contre éscarpe), part of the fortifications from early 1600s. The outworks were demolished in the 19th century. The area had stables for the artillery and cavalry from the 1860s. In the early 1900s, there were plans for designing an opera house at Kontraskjæret.

In 1927, the Skansen restaurant, designed by Lars Backer, was built at Kontraskjæret. The restaurant was regarded as the first functionalist building in Norway, and was demolished in 1970.

The site has further been used for exhibitions, circus and an amusement park.
