= Eivind Astrup =

Norwegian explorer and writer (1871–1895)

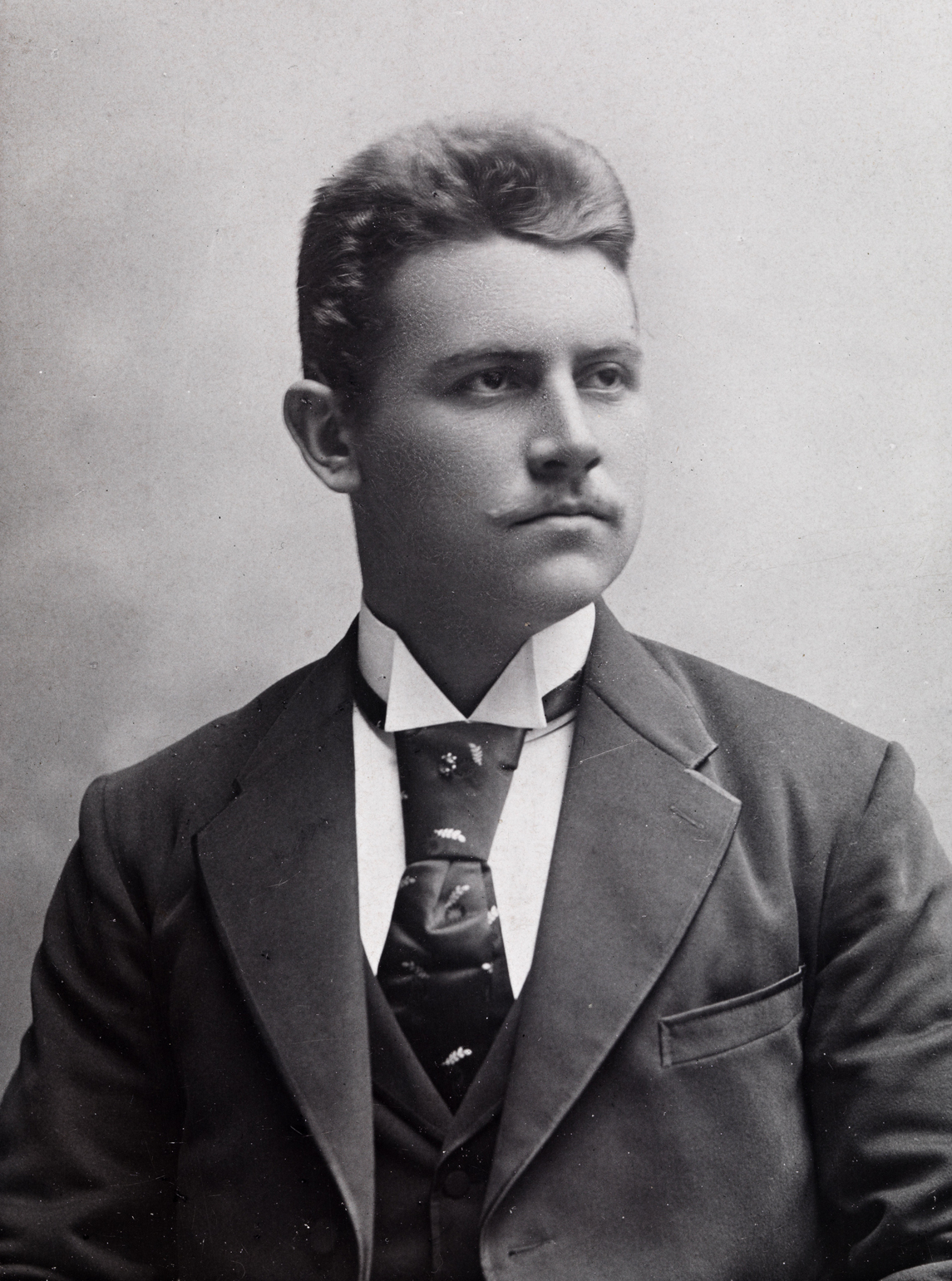
- Astrup c. 1890
- Born: 17 September 1871; Christiania (now Oslo), Norway
- Died: 27 December 1895 (aged 24); Folldal, Norway
- Burial place: Vår Frelsers gravlund, Oslo
- Occupation: Arctic Explorer
- Works: Blandt Nordpolens naboer
- Parent: Harald Astrup
- Relatives: Henning Astrup (brother); Thorvald Astrup (brother); Sigurd Astrup (brother); Peter Andreas Morell (brother-in-law)
- Awards: Order of St. Olav; Murchison Award

Eivind Astrup (Norwegian: [ˈæ̂ɪvɪn ˈɑ̂strʉp]; 17 September 1871 – 27 December 1895) was a Norwegian explorer and writer. Astrup participated in Robert Peary's expedition to Greenland in 1891–92 and mapped northern Greenland. In the follow-up Greenland expedition by Peary during 1893–94 he explored and mapped Melville Bay on the north-west coast of Greenland. Among his works is Blandt Nordpolens Naboer from 1895 (English edition With Peary near the Pole, 1898). He was awarded the Knight of the Order of St. Olav in 1892.

Astrup is credited for introducing the combination of dog sleds and skis, which came to revolutionize polar expeditions.

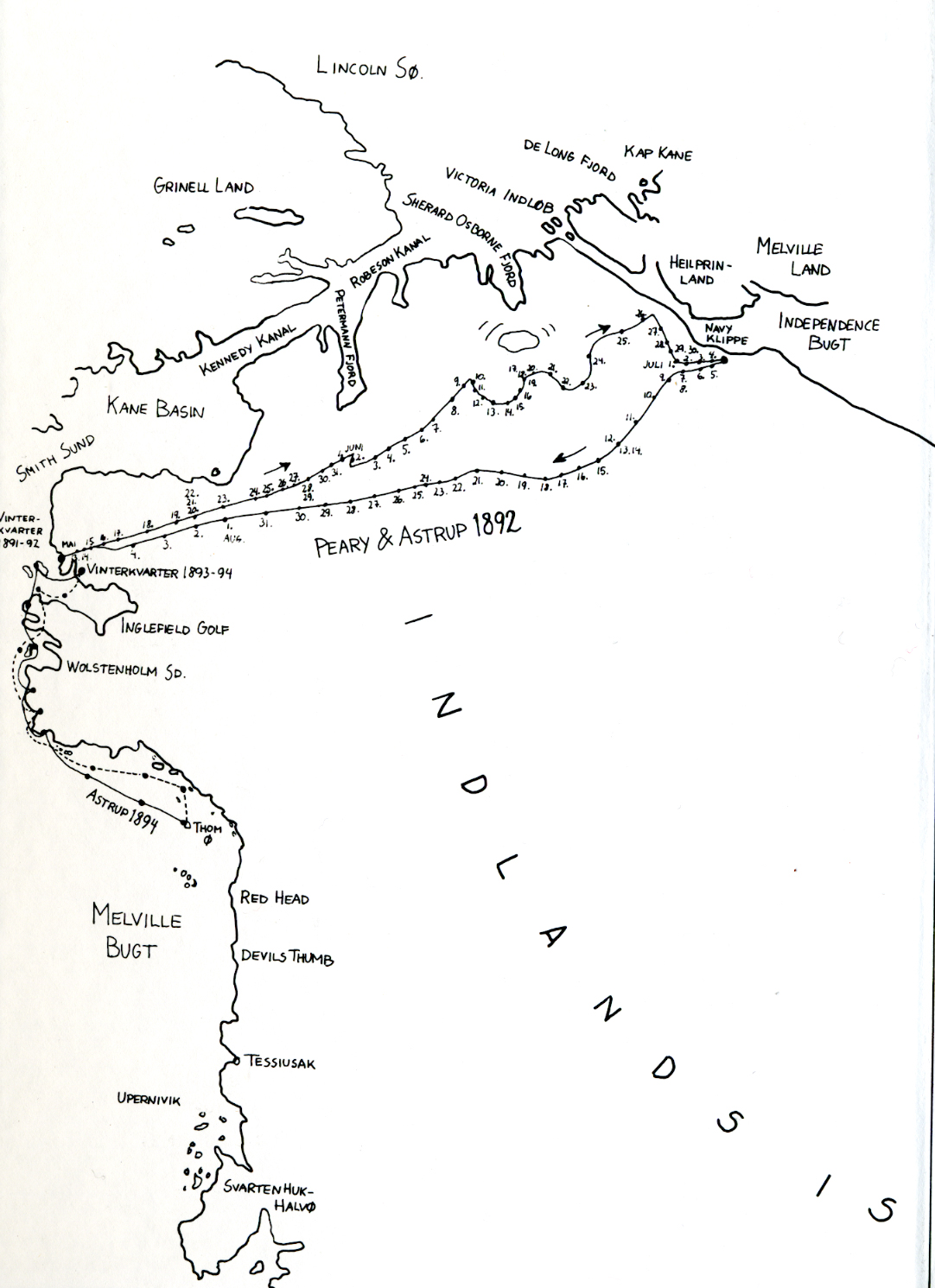
Astrup's map of his travels across Northwest Greenland with Robert Peary in 1892 and with Kolotengva to Melville Bay in April 1894

== Life and work ==
Eivind Astrup was the son of merchant Harald Astrup (1831–1914) and Emilie Johanne Smith (1836–1915), and brother of architect Henning Astrup (1864–1896), architect Thorvald Astrup (1876–1940), and wholesaler and politician, Sigurd Astrup (1873–1949).

In 1889 Astrup undertook a trade examination in Christiania (now Oslo, Norway) and then travelled to Philadelphia for further study. The adventurous youngster had dreamed about exploring in Africa, but after he saw a newspaper article stating that Robert Peary planned an expedition to northern Greenland, he contacted Peary and was given a place on the expedition.

During Peary's expedition in 1891–92 Astrup made friends with the local Inuit from whom he learned about survival techniques in the extreme polar environment.

Astrup accompanied Peary on a sleigh ride from their winter quarters in Inglefield Gulf and over north-western Greenland ice to Navy Cliff at Independence Fjord. They traversed more than 2,000 km, four times as far as Fridtjof Nansen had gone during his exploration of more southerly parts of Greenland four years earlier. Peary and Astrup were the first to explore and map the north-western areas of Greenland and were the first to come to the view that Greenland is an island. The trip had insufficient rations, but a successful hunt for musk ox saved them.

Returning to Norway Astrup was greeted with great honour and attention. In 1892 he received the Order of St. Olav when he was then only 21 years old and is still the youngest person to have received the award. Astrup wrote a series of newspaper articles and essays and gave well-attended lectures in many places in Eastern Norway. Many Norwegians at the time considered Astrup a polar hero, just like Nansen was considered a hero after he crossed the Greenland ice sheet in 1889.

During the second expedition in 1893–1894, Astrup became ill and did not participate in Peary's journey across the inland ice, which otherwise was a failure because of illness, frostbite and bad weather. Instead, in April 1894, Astrup and his friend Kolotengva went on a sleigh to survey the northern side of Melville Bay, with this becoming the only visible result of Peary's second expedition. Weakened by illness, Astrup ceased his involvement in the expedition and returned to Norway where he was received as a hero. The Royal Geographical Society in London honoured Astrup by awarding him the Murchison Award for mapping Melville Bay.

=== Blandt Nordpolens naboer ===
Astrup's book Blandt Nordpolens naboer ("Among North Pole Neighbours"), which was published at the beginning of December 1895, deals with both of his expeditions and provides a portrait of the local Inuit. The book was well received in Norway, with extensive press reviews. It was reissued in 1896, 1950, 1990 and 2004. The book was translated into English in 1898 as "With Peary Near the Pole" and into German in 1905 (German: Unter den Nachbarn des Nordpols). Blandt Nordpolens Naboer has many similarities with Fridtjof Nansen's book Eskimoliv from 1891, depicting the Inuit way of life, social relations and religion. Due to their geographical isolation, the polar Inuit that Astrup met had been less exposed to the European influence that had taken place further south along the western coast of Greenland, and therefore his descriptions were regarded as important among ethnographers.

=== Further plans ===
In a letter to whaling and shipping magnate Svend Foyn in 1894, Astrup proposed an expedition to the South Pole, asking for transport with Foyn's ship. He also developed a plan for travelling to the North Pole in a balloon. In September 1895 he made a scientific balloon trip, along with two others, starting from Kontraskjæret in Kristiania. Astrup's photo taken on this trip on 14 September 1895 is the earliest preserved aerial photo taken in Norway.

He had also acquired five young Greenland Dogs, and trained them on the ice of Frognerkilen. The newspaper Morgenbladet published a notice on the arrival of the dogs, and the sports magazine Norsk idrætsblad printed an illustration of Astrup and his dogs training at Frognerkilen. His dog sled has been preserved at the Holmenkollen Ski Museum.

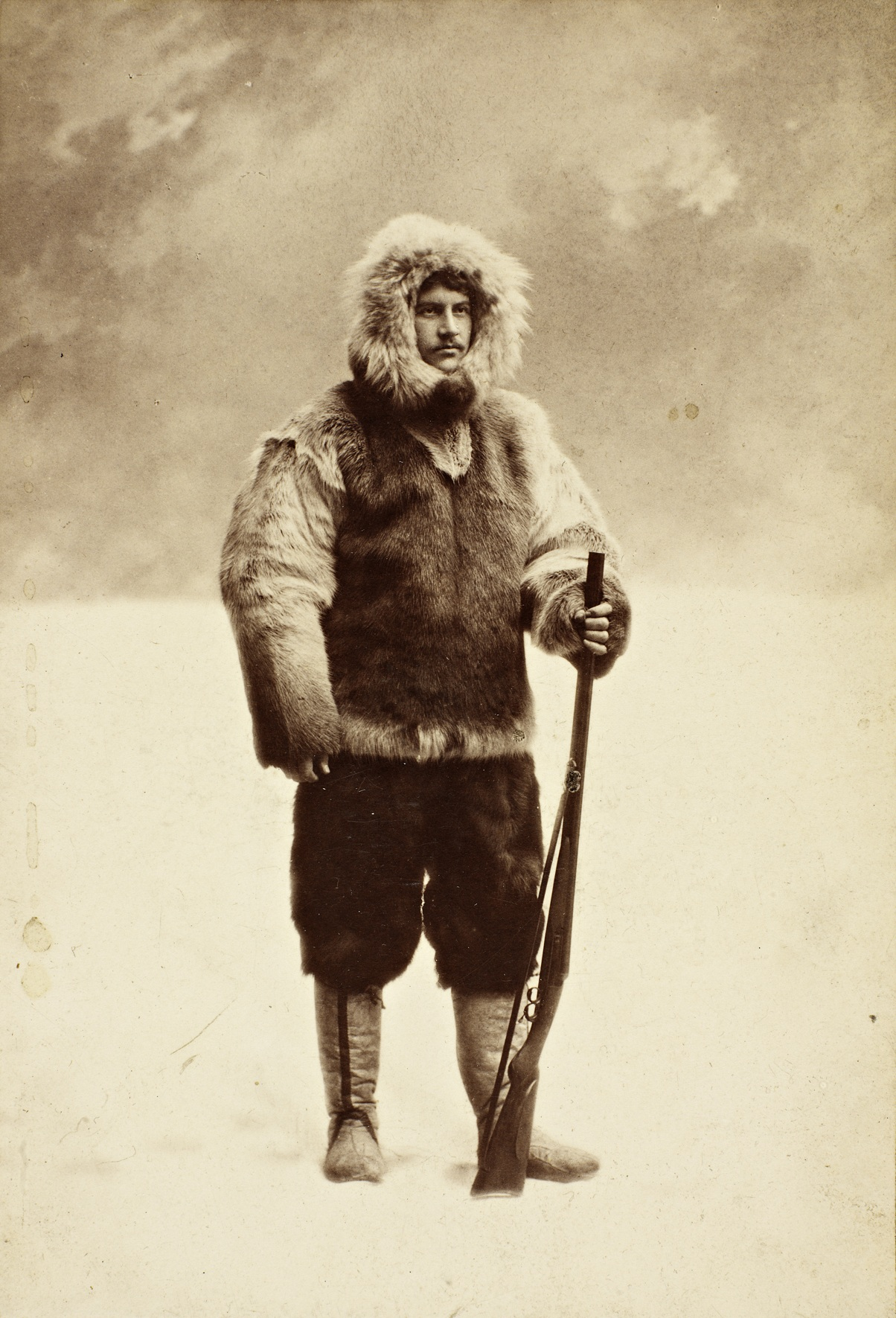
Eivind Astrup

=== Illness and death ===
Astrup wrote in his book that during the second expedition he became very sick after eating stale pemmican. Roald Amundsen noted in his diary that Frederick Cook had told him that Astrup could have suffered syphilis in Greenland. Since the Inuit in the remote areas of Greenland had had relatively little contact with Europeans before Peary's expedition, it is unlikely that they were infected by the disease. So the most likely explanation is that Astrup got typhoid fever from eating the pemmican.

Astrup had made plans for expeditions to both the Arctic and Antarctic. He was one of the first to suggest ballooning over the North Pole. However, his illness prevented him from realizing these plans.

At Christmas 1895, Astrup travelled to Hjerkinn, and on 27 December he went alone on a ski trip to Dovre, ostensibly to meet some friends at Atna. When he did not arrive as expected, a search party was organized and on 21 January 1896 he was found dead four kilometres from Hjerkinn. The body was not subject to an autopsy and there were suggestions that there were attempts to keep the cause of death secret. However, the newspapers Politiken, Dagens Nyheter and Svenska Dagbladet wrote openly that his death was considered to be suicide and not as a result of an accident which was the official explanation. The terrain he was found in made the idea that his death was due to a fall unlikely, and there were rumours that a revolver had been found near the body, then wrapped up and given Astrup's brother, who was asked to hide the object.

The news of Astrup's death led to national mourning in Norway, and a large crowd attended when Eivind Astrup was buried at Our Saviour's Cemetery in Oslo on 27 January 1896.

== Legacy ==
Astrup helped develop techniques for exploring the polar districts, such as carrying equipment on dog sleds, combined with skiing. He had learned skiing while growing up in Norway and he learned from the Inuit how to use sled dogs, as skiing was unknown to the Inuit. Roald Amundsen learnt from Astrup's experience exploring Greenland and Amundsen used this experience for his successful expedition to the South Pole.

== Bibliography ==
- Bloch-Nakkerud, Tom (2011), Polarforskeren Eivind Astrup. En pionér blant Nordpolens naboer, Bastion Publishing, ISBN 978-82-90583-05-2
- Astrup, Eivind (1895) Blandt nordpolens naboer, Kristiania, H. Aschehoug & Co.
- Astrup, Eivind (2004) Blant Nordpolens naboer, Polarbiblioteket ISBN 82-489-0457-1
- Drivenes, Einar-Arne; Jølle, Harald Dag, eds. (2004). Norsk polarhistorie (in Norwegian). Vol. 2. Vitenskapene. Oslo: Gyldendal. ISBN 82-05-32656-8.
