= Morningstar Rating for Funds =

Rating system for investment funds

The Morningstar Rating for Funds is a rating system for investment funds operated by Morningstar. The Star Rating debuted in 1985, a year after Morningstar was founded. The 1- to 5-star system, "looks at a fund's risk-adjusted return based on its performance over three, five and 10 years and on its volatility. The highest rating of five stars is bestowed on the 10 percent of funds that perform the best." Funds need to be at least three years old to be rated.

Originally, funds were compared in four broad asset classes until the ratings methodology was revised in 2002 to rank and rate funds in 50 categories. In 2006, the Morningstar Rating was applied to exchange-traded funds.
