= Peter Andreas Morell =

Norwegian politician (1868–1948)

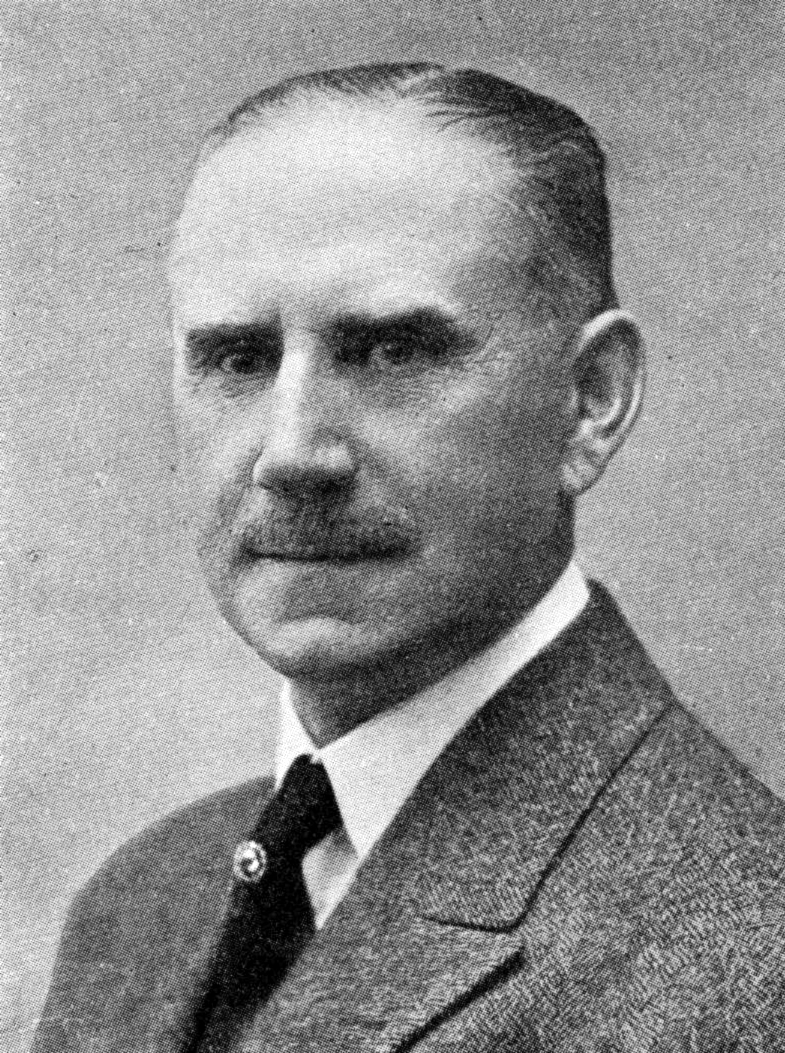
Peter Andreas Morell

Peter Andreas Amundsen Morell (1 January 1868 – 30 January 1948) was a Norwegian farmer and politician.

Peter Morell was born in Aker (now Akershus), Norway. He was the son of Ole Amundsen (1827–85) and Johanna Gustava Kjelin (1844–1918). Morrell took over the Nedre Grefsen farm which had been purchased by his father in 1855. He later took over the nearby farms Storo (1889) and Østre Grefsen (1895) .

Morell was the mayor of Aker (1902–1907) and (1911–1916). He was elected to the Storting between 1903 and 1912. He was the Norwegian Minister of Social Affairs in the government formed by Ivar Lykke (1926 to 1928).

In 1890, he married Hanna Astrup (1869–1933), daughter of Harald Astrup. Her brothers included the architects Henning Astrup (1864–1896) and Thorvald Astrup (1876–1940), Arctic explorer Eivind Astrup (1871–1895) and member of Parliament Sigurd Astrup (1873–1949).

Peter Morell established a foundation (Hanna og Peter Andreas Morells legat) in support of higher education for residents of Grefsen. The neighbourhood, which was named after the Grefsen farm, was later incorporated into the district of Nordre Aker in Oslo.
