= Thorvald Astrup =

Norwegian architect (1876–1940)

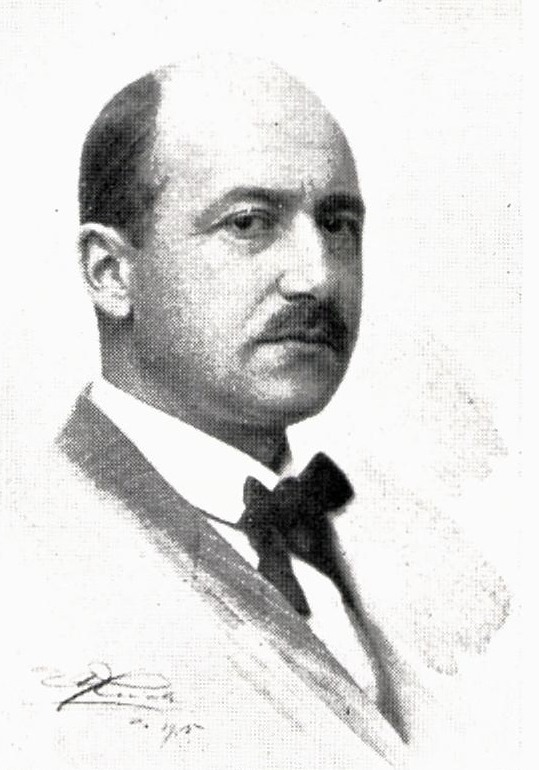
- Thorvald Astrup
- Born: 18 May 1876; Oslo, Norway
- Died: 12 August 1940 (aged 64)
- Education: Kristiania Technical School in 1891-92; Kristiania Fine Art School; Technische Hochschule Charlottenburg
- Occupation: Architect
- Years active: 1899-1940
- Known for: Såheim Power Station; Tyssedal Power Station; Norsk Hydro administration building Tinnoset Line and Rjukan Line stations
- Style: Neoclassicism, functionalism, jugendstil
- Children: Henning Astrup
- Parent: Harald Astrup
- Relatives: Eivind Astrup (brother); Sigurd Astrup (brother); Henning Astrup (brother)

Thorvald Astrup (18 May 1876 – 12 August 1940) was a Norwegian architect, particularly known for industrial architecture.

He was born in Kristiania (now Oslo), Norway. He was the son of city captain Harald Astrup and Johanne Emilie Smith. He was a brother of Arctic explorer Eivind Astrup (1871–1895), merchant Sigurd Astrup (1873–1949) and architect Henning Astrup (1864–1896). His sister Hanna (1869–1933) was married to politician Peter Andreas Morell.

He was educated at Kristiania Technical School in 1891-92 and Kristiania Fine Art School the following year. He also attended Technische Hochschule Charlottenburg from 1896 to 1897. In 1899 he started to work as an architect with Henrik Nissen and Henrik Bull. In 1901, he opened architectural practice in Kristiania. From 1934, he worked together with his son, architect Henning Thorvaldsson Astrup (1904–83), under the company name Thorvald and Henning Astrup.

Astrup specialized in industrial constructions, particularly related to power production and transmission, factories and dams; many monumental installations were built in neoclassical or functionalistic style. These include Såheim Power Station in Rjukan (1916), Tyssedal Power Station (1906), while the administration building for Norsk Hydro in Rjukan is built in jugendstil style. His neoclassical buildings included the Soria Moria cinema in Oslo (1928). Astrup also designed all of the railway stations on the Tinnoset Line and Rjukan Line.

He is buried at a family grave in the Cemetery of Our Saviour.

== Gallery ==
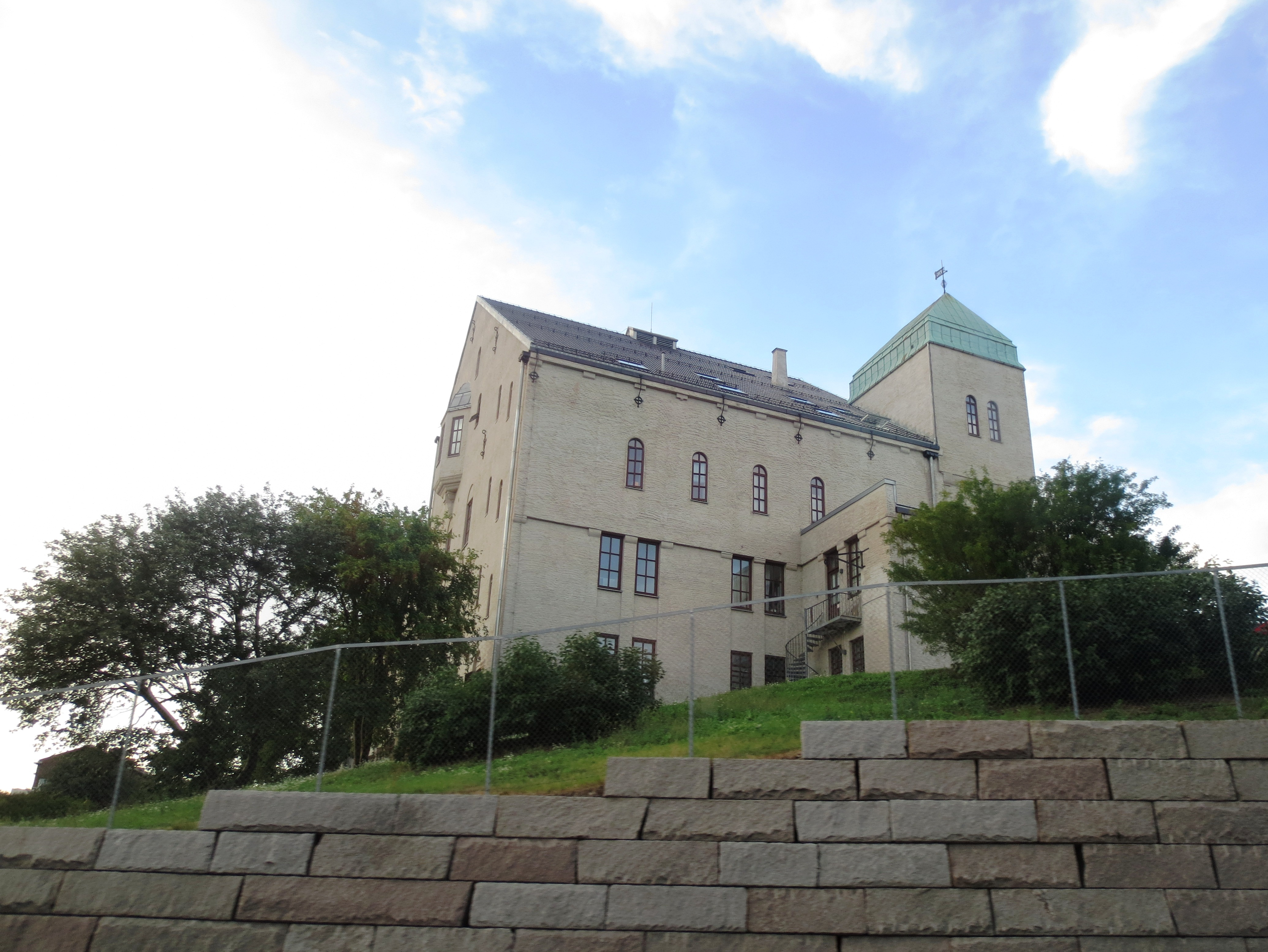
Tram station at Tøyen in Oslo

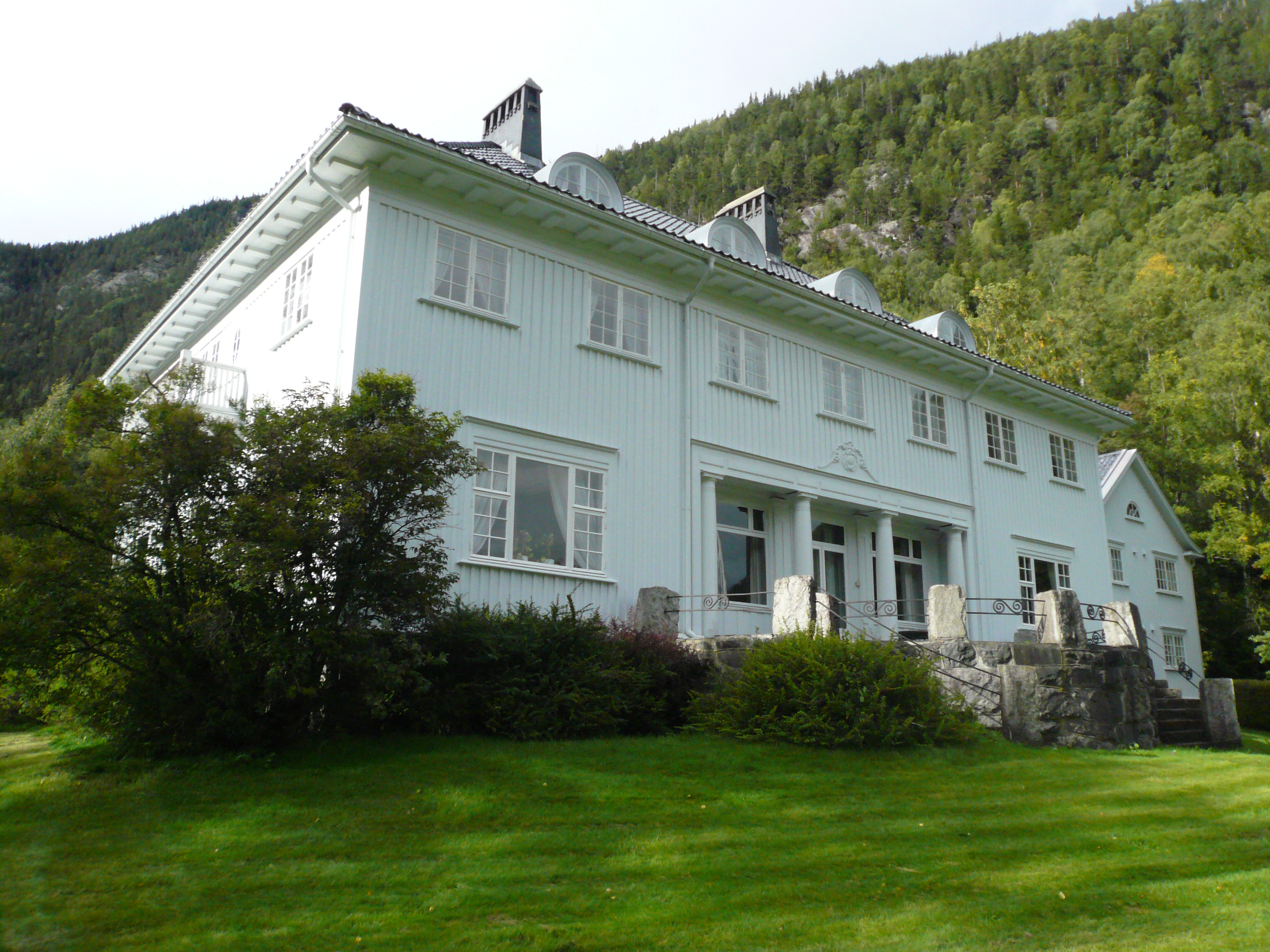
Norsk Hydro main building at Rjukan

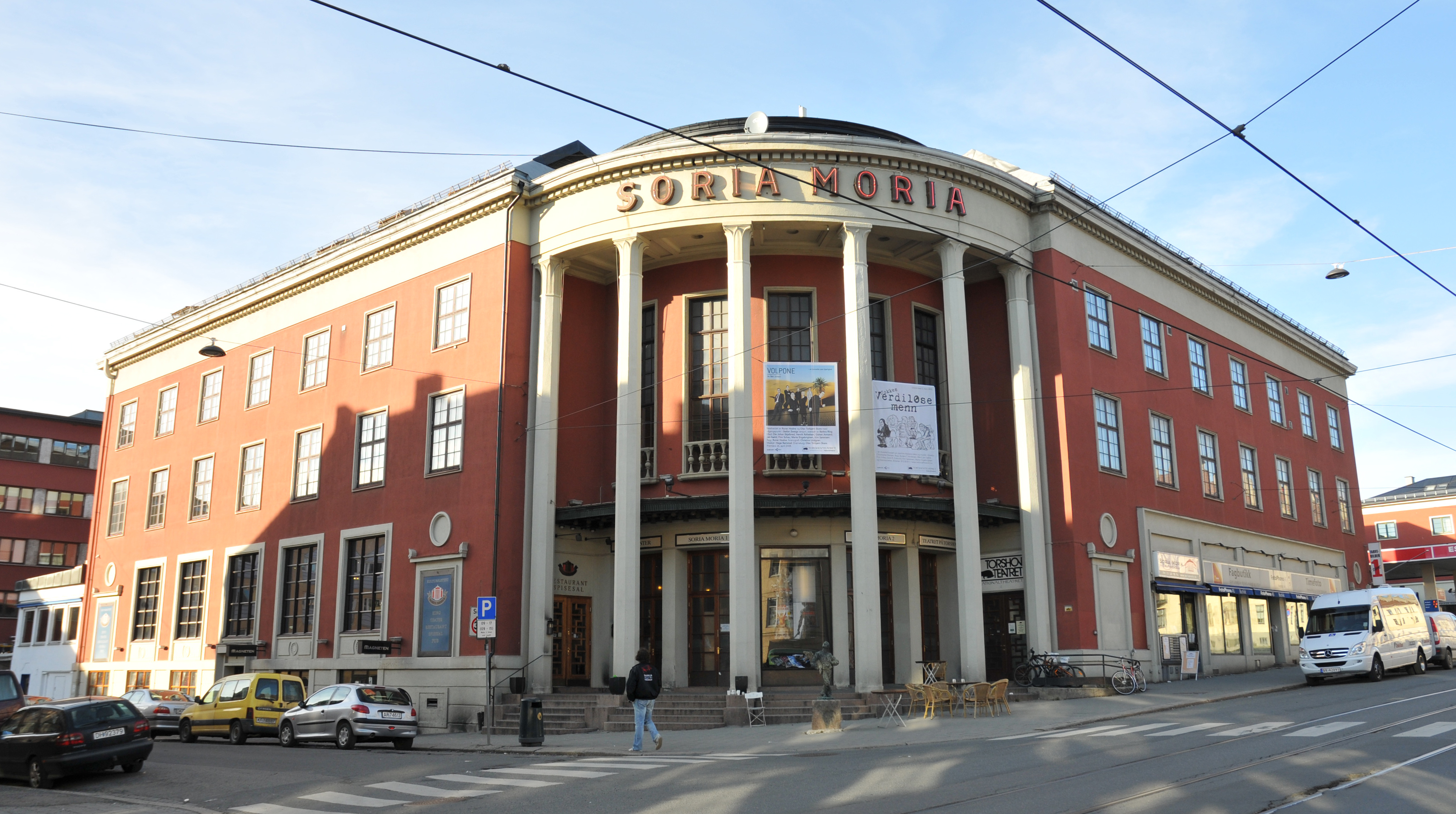
Soria Moria at Voftsgate in Oslo

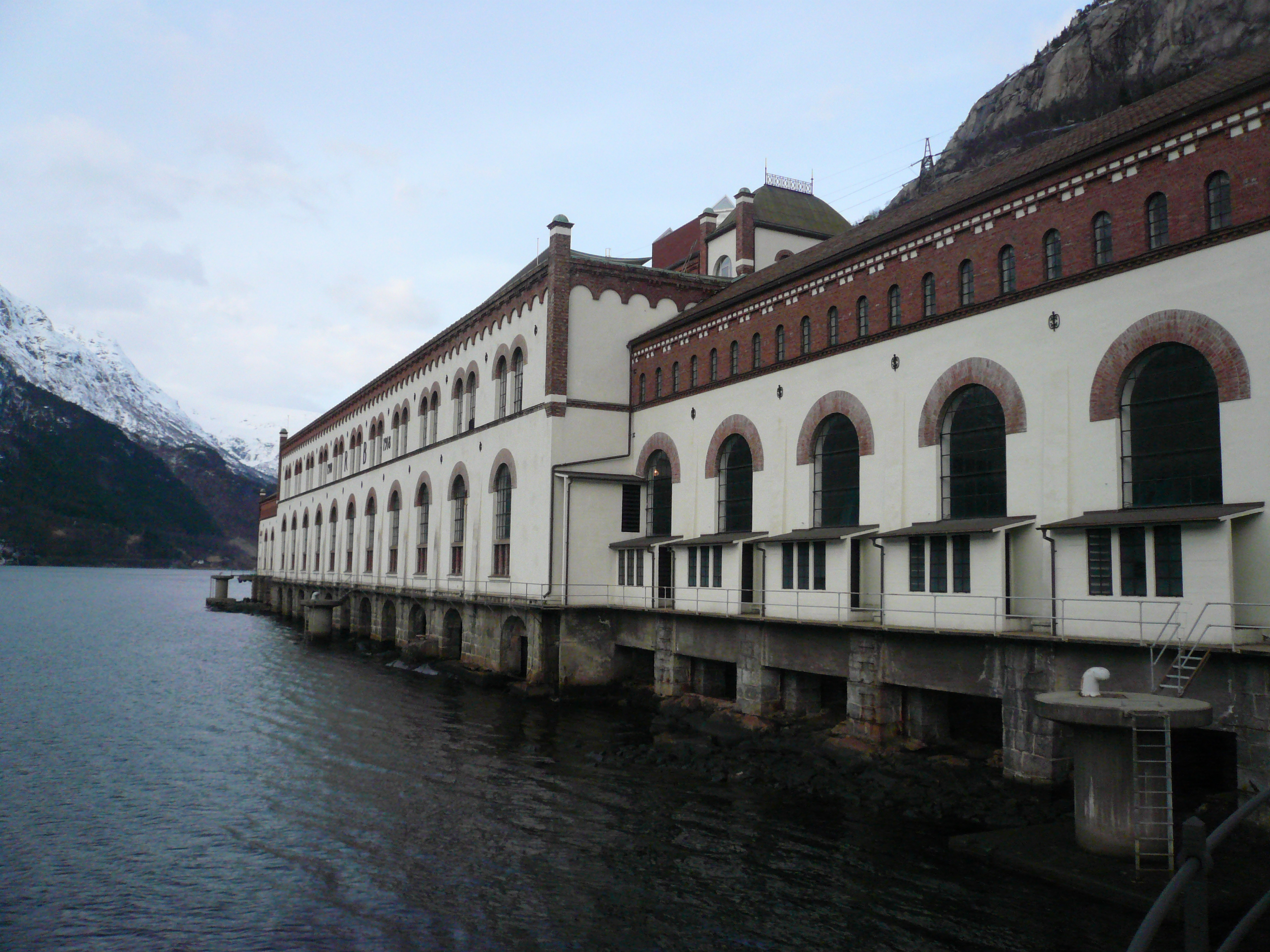
Tyssedal Hydroelectric power plant in Odda

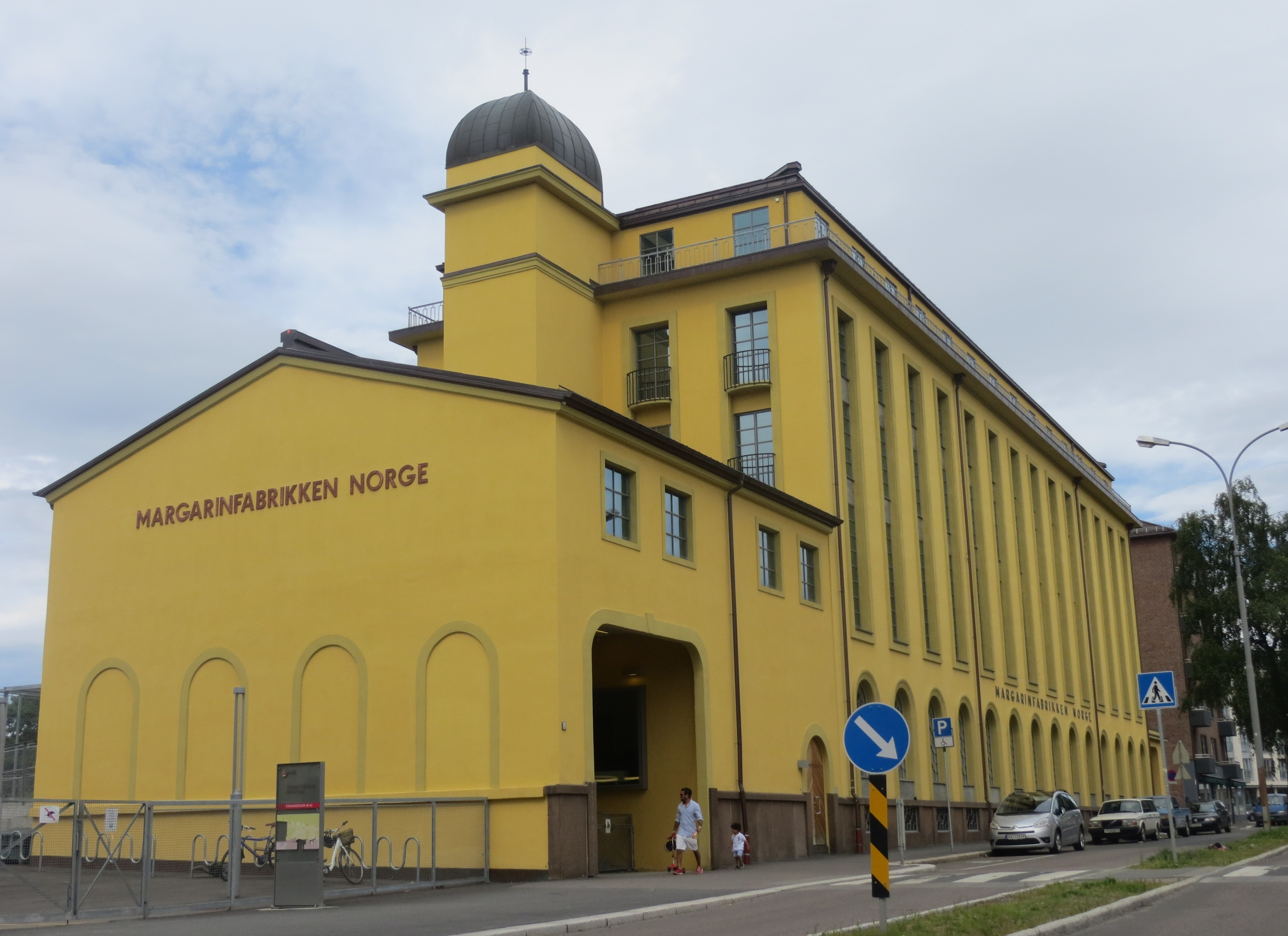
Margarinfabrikken in Oslo
