= Norske Folk =

Norwegian life insurance company

Norske Folk was a life insurance company based in Norway.

It was founded in 1917. In 1984 it started a cooperation with Norges Brannkasse named UNI Forsikring. In 1989 Norske Folk was redesigned into a public company named UNI Liv. In 1991 the entire UNI Forsikring was merged with Storebrand.
