= Skagen Funds =

Scandinavian mutual fund company

Skagen AS
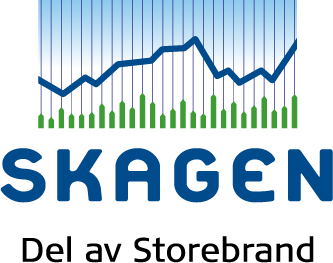
- Type: Private
- Industry: Financial services
- Founded: 1993; 33 years ago
- Defunct: 23 November 2023
- Headquarters: Stavanger, Norway
- Area served: Scandinavia, UK, The Netherlands, Germany
- Services: Mutual funds
- Owner: Storebrand
- Website: www.skagenfunds.com

Skagen Funds is a Scandinavian mutual fund company founded in 1993 in Stavanger, Norway, which offers actively managed equity funds. In 2017, Skagen became part of Storebrand Asset Management but the company remains an independent fund management business with its own Board of Directors.

== History ==
Skagen Funds was launched in December 1993 by Kristoffer Stensrud, Tor Dagfinn Veen and Åge K. Westbø. The name Skagen came from the name of the street where the company is used to be headquartered. Starting in 1997, the company expanded to market its funds to Sweden and Denmark before establishing local offices in subsequent years. SKAGEN Funds was approved to operate in Luxembourg in 2005, in the Netherlands and Finland in 2006, in Iceland and Great Britain in 2007, in Switzerland in 2011, in Belgium in 2013, in Ireland and Germany in 2014, in France in 2016.

Bloomberg reported on January 29, 2014, that Skagen's emerging market fund, SKAGEN Kon-Tiki, had assets under management of 50 billion krone ($8 billion) with an annualized return of 14 percent over the previous 10 years, the eighth-best performer among 1120 similar funds tracked by Bloomberg. The company’s other funds include SKAGEN Global, SKAGEN Vekst, SKAGEN M2 and SKAGEN Focus.

In October 2017, SKAGEN Funds was acquired by Storebrand.

== Recent History ==
Between 2014 and 2025, SKAGEN Funds faced a significant outflow of investor capital. According to coverage in Dagens Næringsliv published on 25 July 2025, investors redeemed approximately NOK 123 billion during this period—prompting the article to characterize the event as “Norway’s largest fund collapse in history.” This decline followed a shift in ownership and management, complex sales operations, investor withdrawals, and deteriorating returns.

== Operations ==
The company's head office is located in Stavanger and it also has Norwegian branch offices in Oslo, Trondheim, Ålesund and Bergen, as well as international offices in Denmark, England, Sweden and Germany.

The firm's portfolio managers base their investment decisions on their own research, rather than corporate relationships or internal analyst teams.

== See also ==
- Storebrand
