= Livsforsikringsselskapet Idun =

Norwegian company

Livsforsikringsselskapet Idun was a Norwegian insurance company.

It was founded in 1861. The first chief executive was Jørgen Gjerdrum. Idun was incorporated into Storebrand in the 1970s. The current CFO is Anne Barfod, and she leads the Board.
