= Alf Tjersland =

Norwegian engineer and businessperson

Alf Tjersland (6 September 1881 – 12 June 1955) was a Norwegian engineer and businessperson.

He was born in Kristiania as a son of Abraham Tjersland (1844–1922) and Thora Didrichsen. In 1931 he married Ellen Messel, née Platou, a sister of Theodor Platou, but the marriage was later dissolved.

He attended middle school in 1897 and Skiensfjorden Mechanical School in 1900 before graduating from Mittweida in 1903. He also studied at the Royal Technical College in Glasgow in 1904 and at New York Trade School for plumbers in 1907. He worked in Dayton, Ohio from 1904 to 1905, then in Chicago for one year, then in St. Louis for one year. In 1906 he was elected as a member of the American Society of Heating, Ventilating Engineers. He was a chief engineer in E. Sunde & Co. from 1907 to 1911, and became a master plumber in 1912. He was the chief executive of E. Sunde & Co. from 1914. From 1922 he was also the chairman of the board.

He chaired the employers' association Varme- og sanitærentreprenørenes forening from 1917 to 1918, then the Norwegian Association of Plumbing, Heating and Ventilating Contractors from 1919. From 1927 to 1928 he was an executive committee member in the Federation of Norwegian Industries, chairing its home industry group the last year. He chaired the trade group in Mekaniske Værksteders Landsforening from 1926 to 1932, and was then vice chairman for one year.

He also chaired Norges Hypotekforening for Næringslivet from 1927 to 1929, was a board member of Statens metalcentral from 1917 to 1919, Selskabet for Oslo Byes Vel from 1927 and the Norwegian Fire Protection Association from 1937, deputy board member of the Polytechnic Society from 1918 to 1922 and a council member of the Norway Travel Association from 1925. From 1927 to 1929 he was a member of the Conservative Party finance and control committee. He died in 1955, and was buried at Vår Frelsers gravlund.

Tjersland supported Taylorisme.
