= UNI Forsikring =

Norwegian insurance company

UNI Forsikring was an insurance group based in Norway.

It was founded in 1984 as a cooperation between life insurance company Norske Folk and general insurance company Norges Brannkasse. It was decided to restructure the two parties as public companies in 1989, under the names UNI Liv and UNI Skade respectively. In 1991 UNI Forsikring was merged with Storebrand to form UNI Storebrand; which however reverted to the name Storebrand after some years.
