= Henning Astrup =

Norwegian architect (1864–1896)

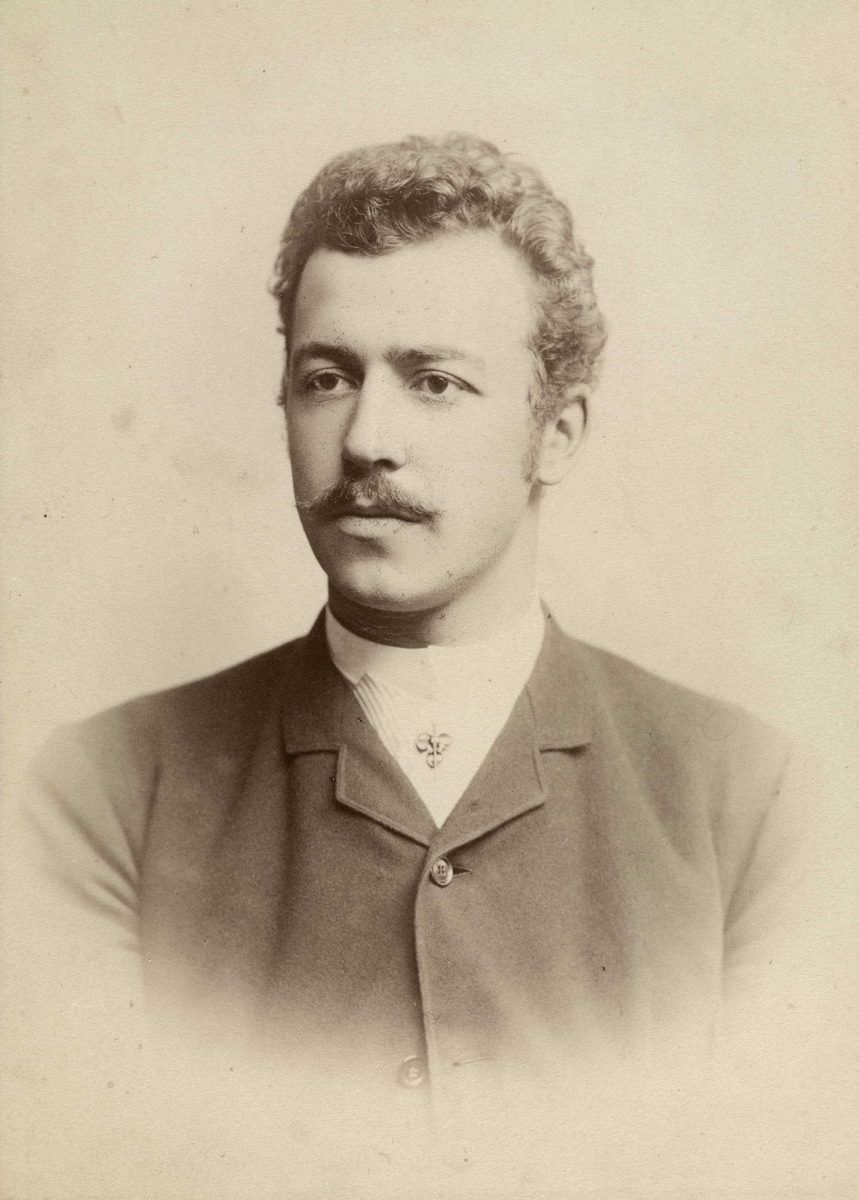
- Henning Astrup
- Born: 6 June 1864; Kristiania, Norway
- Died: 7 December 1896 (aged 32)
- Occupation: Architect
- Parent: Harald Astrup
- Relatives: Eivind Astrup (brother); Sigurd Astrup (brother); Thorvald Astrup (brother); Peter Andreas Morell (brother-in-law)

Henning Astrup (6 June 1864 – 7 December 1896) was a Norwegian architect.

He was born in Kristiania (now Oslo, Norway) to city captain (stadshauptmann) Harald Astrup and Johanne Emilie Smith. He was a brother of Arctic explorer Eivind Astrup (1871–1895), merchant Sigurd Astrup (1873–1949), and architect Thorvald Astrup (1876–1940). His sister Hanna (1869–1933) was married to politician Peter Andreas Morell.

Astrup graduated from the Königliche Technische Hochschule in Berlin (today Technische Universität Berlin. He cooperated professionally with architect Henrik Nissen, and among their designs were Speilsalen of the Grand Hotel in Oslo the Calmeyer Street Mission House from 1891, and Frimurerlogens stamhus (Lodge of the Freemasons) from 1894.

== Gallery ==
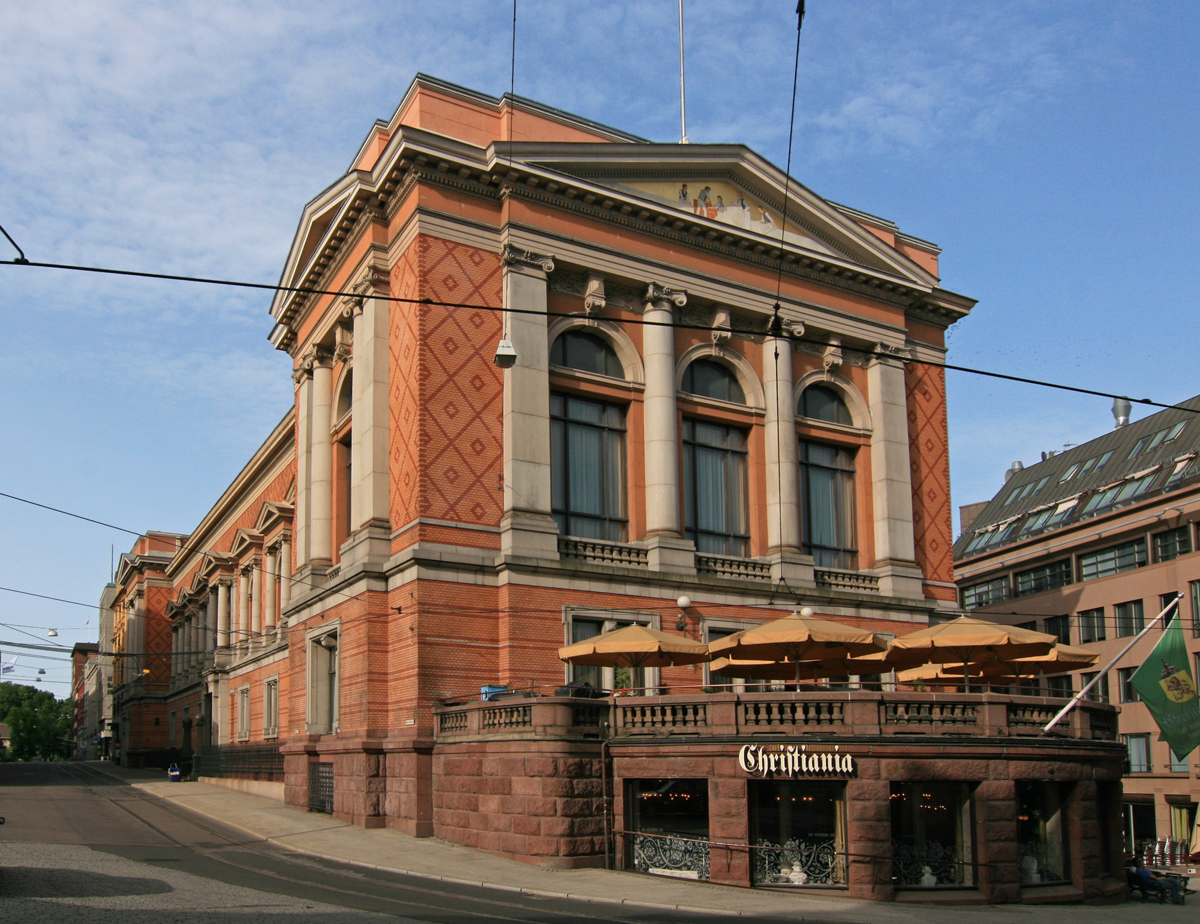
Frimurerlogens stamhus

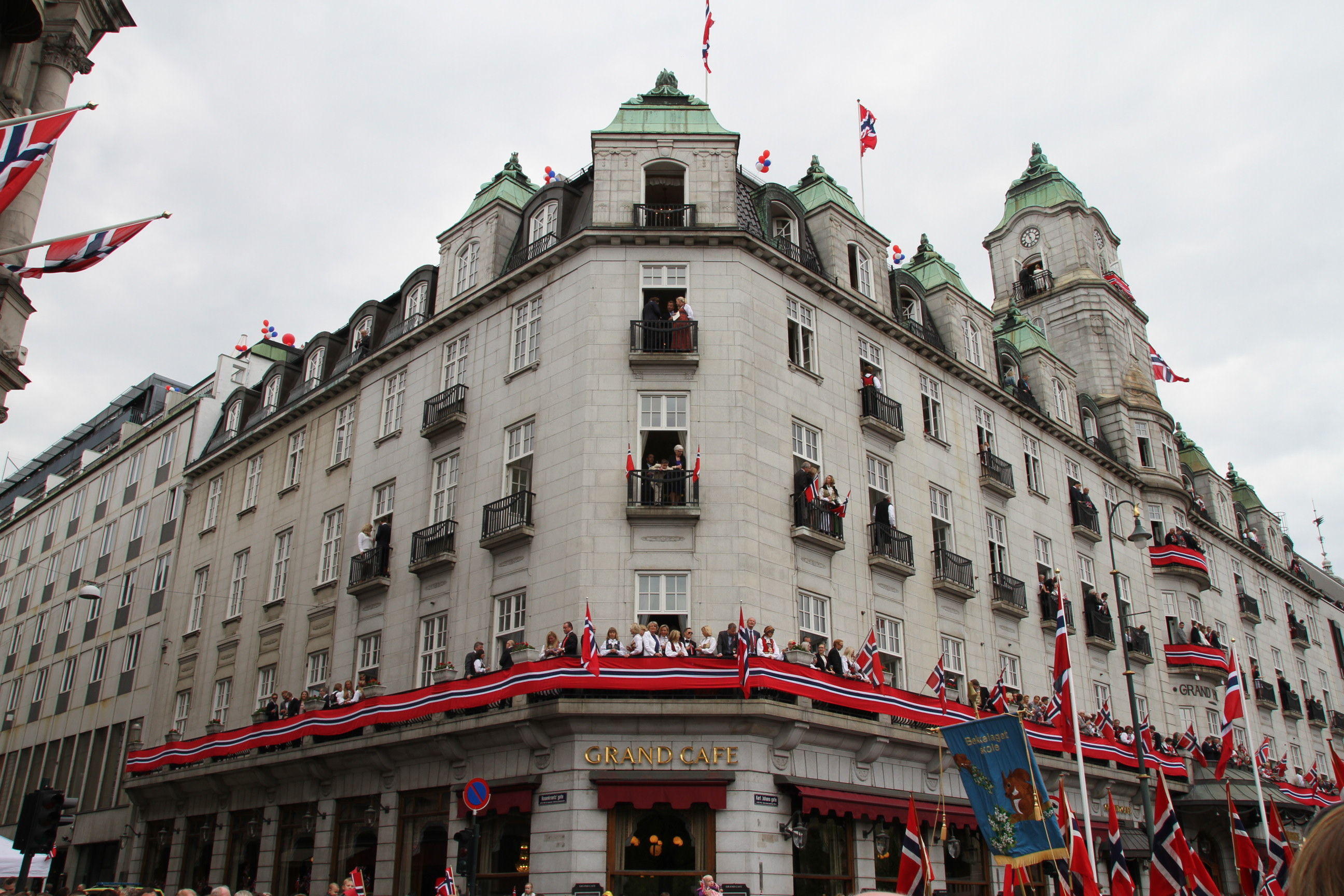
Speilsalen

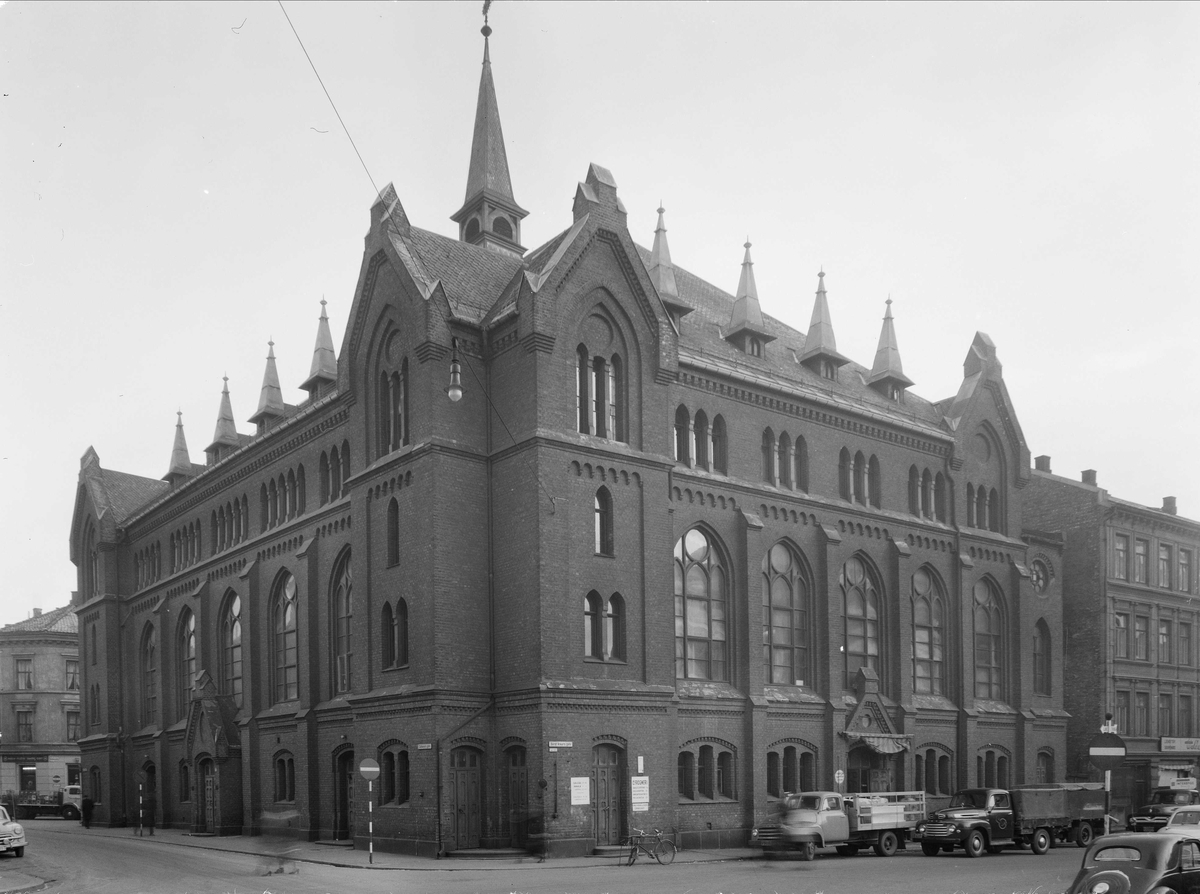
The Calmeyer Street Mission House
