= Storebrand =

Norwegian financial services company

Coordinates: 59°54′41.7″N 10°37′50.1″E

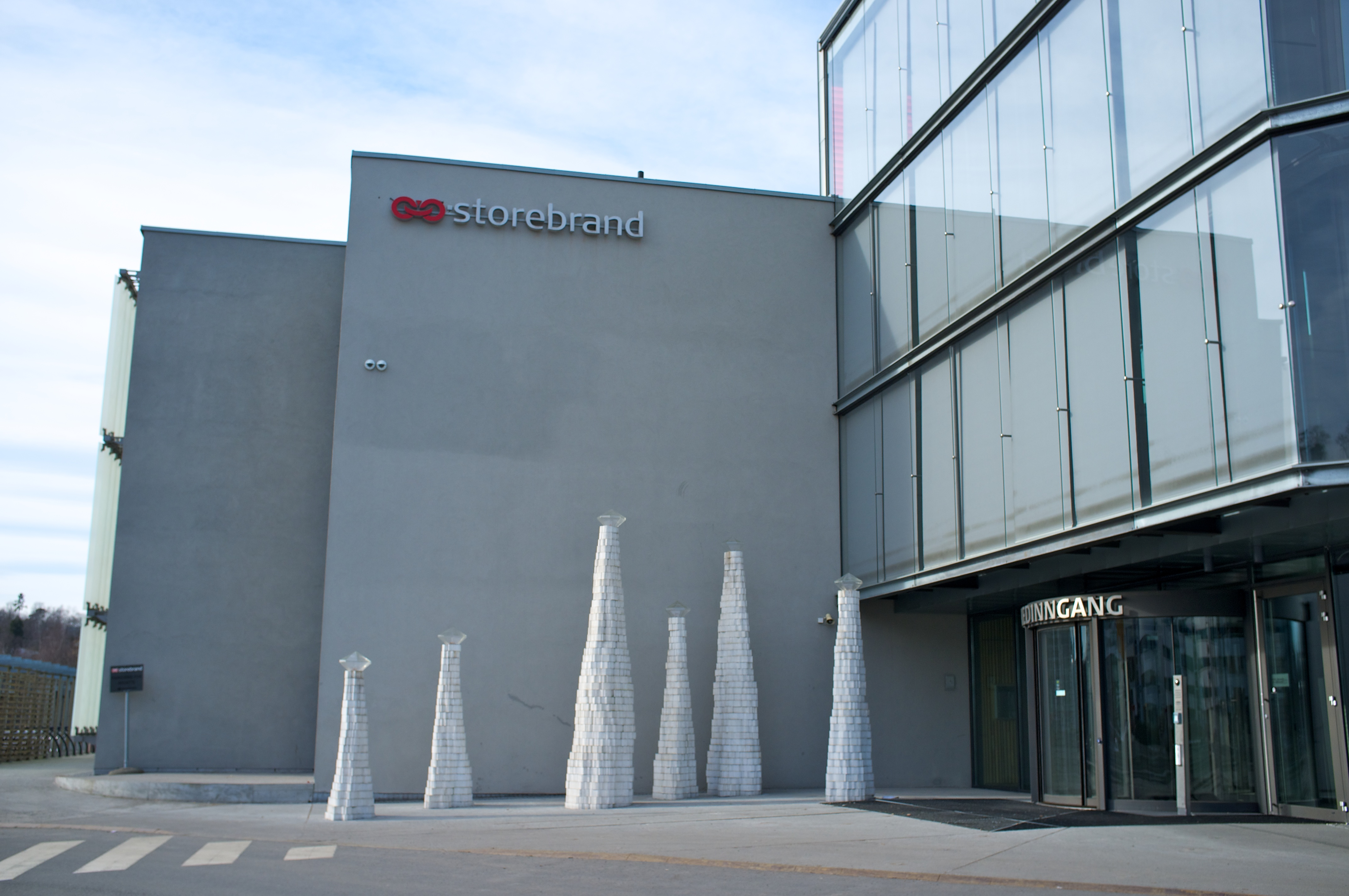
- Type: Allmennaksjeselskap
- Traded as: OSE: STB
- Industry: Insurance
- Founded: 1767
- Headquarters: Lysaker, Norway
- Area served: Norway, Sweden
- Key people: Odd Arild Grefstad (CEO), Jarle Roth (Chairman)
- Revenue: NOK 14.588 billion (2025)
- Net income: NOK 5.023 billion (2025)
- Total assets: NOK 988.183 billion (2025)
- Total equity: NOK 33.588 billion (2025)
- Number of employees: 2,541 (FTE, 2025)
- Website: www.storebrand.com

Storebrand is a financial services company in Norway. By volume, the company's main activities are related to life insurance and pension savings. However, the company also has major divisions working on investments, banking and, until 1999 and again since 2006, P&C insurance products. Through its acquisition of Swedish SPP from Handelsbanken in 2007, Storebrand gained a sizable division dedicated to the Swedish market for life insurance.

The company's headquarters are located in Lysaker in the municipality of Bærum, just outside Oslo, Norway.

Storebrand is a public company listed on the Oslo Stock Exchange. The company CEO is Odd Arild Grefstad.

Storebrand issues an annual report for companies engaging in socially responsible investments.

== Stock market information ==
Storebrand ASA is listed on the Oslo Stock Exchange under the ticker symbol STB, and is classified within the financial sector. The share is included in both the OSEBX benchmark index and the OBX index, xhich consist of the 25 most traded stocks on the Oslo Stock Exchange.

Storebrand has a diversified ownership structure with a high proportion of institutional and foreign ownership. Its largest individual shareholder is the Government Pension Fund Norway (Folketrygdfondet), holding approximately 11 percent of the shares.

== Mergers and acquisitions ==
During the 1970s, Storebrand acquired the remaining share in the Det norske Livsforsikringsselvskab Idun, in which it held a majority stake since 1923. This was followed by the merger with Norden in 1982, and in 1991 UNI was integrated into the group through the establishment of UNI Storebrand.

In 2002, Storebrand acquired Delphi funds, followed by Swedish life insurance sompany SPP in 2007.

In 2017, Storebrand acquired asset manager SKAGEN for NOK 1.6 billion. The company was founded in Stavanger in 1993 by Kristoffer Stensrud, Åge Westbø, and Tor Dagfinn Veen. Under Storebrands ownership, SKAGEN continues to operate as an independent value-based asset manager, retaining its brand and headquarters in Stavanger.

Storebrand Asset Management acquired Oslo-based secondaries investor Cubera Private Equity for NOK 300 million in 2019.

A key part of Storebrands growth in the retail savings market has been its acquisition of Kron in 2022. Kron is a Norwegian fintech company focused on making investing and pesion saving simple and accessible through a digital-first experience.

== History ==
=== Origins (1767-1919) ===
Storebrands oldest roots trace back to "Den almindelige Brand-Forsikrings-Anstalt", established in 1767 as a compulsory fire insurance scheme for buildings in Norwegian cities. The scheme later evolved into Norges Brannkasse. The name Storebrand originates from "Christiania almindelige Branfosikrings-Selskab for Varer og Effekter", founded on May 4, 1847.

=== Growth and consolidation ===
Throughout the 20th century, Storebrand expanded through a series of acquisitions and mergers, including the acquisition of Idun (1923) and the travel insurance company Europeiske (1936). In 1983, the Norden Group and the Storebrand Group merged, an in 1984 Norske Folk and Norges Brannkasse were jointly marketed under the name UNI forsikring. The company changed its name to AS Storebrand in 1986.

=== The UNI Storebrand crisis ===
In 1991 Storebrand merged with the companies under the UNI Forsikring trademark (Norges Brannkasse and Norske Folk), to become UNI Storebrand. Later attempts to acquire Swedish insurance company Skandia, together with Danish company Hafnia and Finnish company Pohjola, to form a large Nordic insurance company under Norwegian leadership, failed in 1992. This caused the share prices of UNI Storebrand to plummet and the government took control of the company. In 1993 the company successfully managed to restructure its debt and was again made available for trading on the Oslo Stock Exchange.

=== From 1996 to the present ===
In 1996 the company changed its name to Storebrand ASA, and was granted governmental concession to operate banking services through its fully owned subsidiary Storebrand Bank.

The following year, attempts to merge with Christiania Bank og Kreditkasse, now part of Nordea, failed as Storebrand did not achieve the necessary two-thirds majority for the merger from its shareholders. 63,38 percent voted in favor.

In 1999 Storebrand merged its P&C insurance division with similar divisions of Skandia and Pohjola to form If P&C Insurance, in which Storebrand retained an ownership share of 33 percent. The shares were later sold, a natural consequence of Storebrand starting a new P&C insurance division to become a competitor of If, while If also became a competitor of Storebrand by selling health insurance and certain pension plans.

In 2007, the group acquired the Swedish pension provider SPP.

Odd Arild Grefstad became CEO in 2012.

Subsequent acquisitions include private equity manager Cubera (2019), fintech and savings platform Kron (2022) , and Danica Pensjon Norge (integrated in 2023).

== Responsible investments and sustainability ==
Responsible investing and sustainability are integral parts of Storebrands strategy.

Storebrand Asset Managements publishes public exclusion list of companies removed from its portfolios based on factors such as:

- Coal
- Oil sands
- Tobacco
- Controversial weapons
- Human rights violations

The policy of excluding weapons manufactures became the subject of public debate in 2025, with some arguing that such exclusions could reduce investment returns, while Storebrands portfolio managers maintained that hte exclusions could be implemented without financial cost.

== Criticism and controversies ==
=== The UNI Storebrand Crisis ===
the failed attempt to acquire Skandia in 1991-1992 remains one of the most widely discussed events in Norwegian financial history.

The group was placed under public administration on 25 August 1992 and investigated through NOU 1993:9 and NOU 1994:7.

=== Financial Supervisory Authority criticism of fund marketing ===
In March 2022, Norway's Financial Supervisory Authority (Finanstilsynet) criticized Storebrand Asset Management following a document-based review.

The authority concluded that the funds Storebrand Kreditt and Storebrand Kort Kreditt IG had been presented with stronger historical performance than they had actually achieved, due to comparisons with benchmark indices considered non-representative. Finanstilsynet stated that it viewed the issues seriously, and Storebrand subsequently implemented corrective measures.

=== Review of Storebrand Bank ===
Following an on-site inspection, finanstilsynet published a report in April 2026 identifying significant weaknesses in Storebrand Banks internal controls, particularly regarding anti-money laundering compliance.

According to the regulator, the Board had not adequately addressed known weaknesses dating back to 2019 despite strong lending growth, and the banks lending practices exposed it to credit risk inconsistent with the boards stated risk appetite.

=== Criticism of misleading sustainability marketing ===
In June 2026, Finanstilsynet concluded that sustainability information about funds on Storebrands Banks kron.no platform was misleading.

The regulator found the Mornignstar sustainability globes were presented in a way that could lead consumers to believe they measured the actual sustainability of investments rather than sustainability risk. Storebrand acknowledged that it had used an outdated explanation and removed both the sustainability globe rating and carbon-risk rating for the fund overview.

== Awards and recognition ==
Storebrand has received several awards related to gender equality and customer satisfaction, including:

- First place in the SHE Index in 2023 and 2024.
- Dow Jones Best-in-Class World Index in 2024.
- Top ranking for the saving app Kron in EPSI customer satisfaction surveys.
- ODA Champions Award in 2026.

== Annual reports ==
Annual report 2025

== See also ==
- List of oldest companies
