= Nordic Paper =

Industrial company

- Industry: Paper industry
- Founded: 2001
- Headquarters: Säffle, Sweden
- Key people: Richard Heiberg (CEO); Sverre A. Larssen (chair)
- Owner: Petek GmbH (50.41%); NorgesInvestor III AS (32.60%); Richard Heiberg Invest AS (7.64%); JSR Invest AB (7.64%)Hartvig Wennberg AS (1.71%)
- Website: www.nordic-paper.com

Nordic Paper is an industrial company, operating in Norway and Sweden. It was founded in 2001 when Peterson Scanproof, a branch of M. Peterson & Søn which consisted of production units in Greåker (formerly owned by Greaker Industrier) and Säffle, was merged with a paper factory in Geithus, owned by Norske Skog Union.

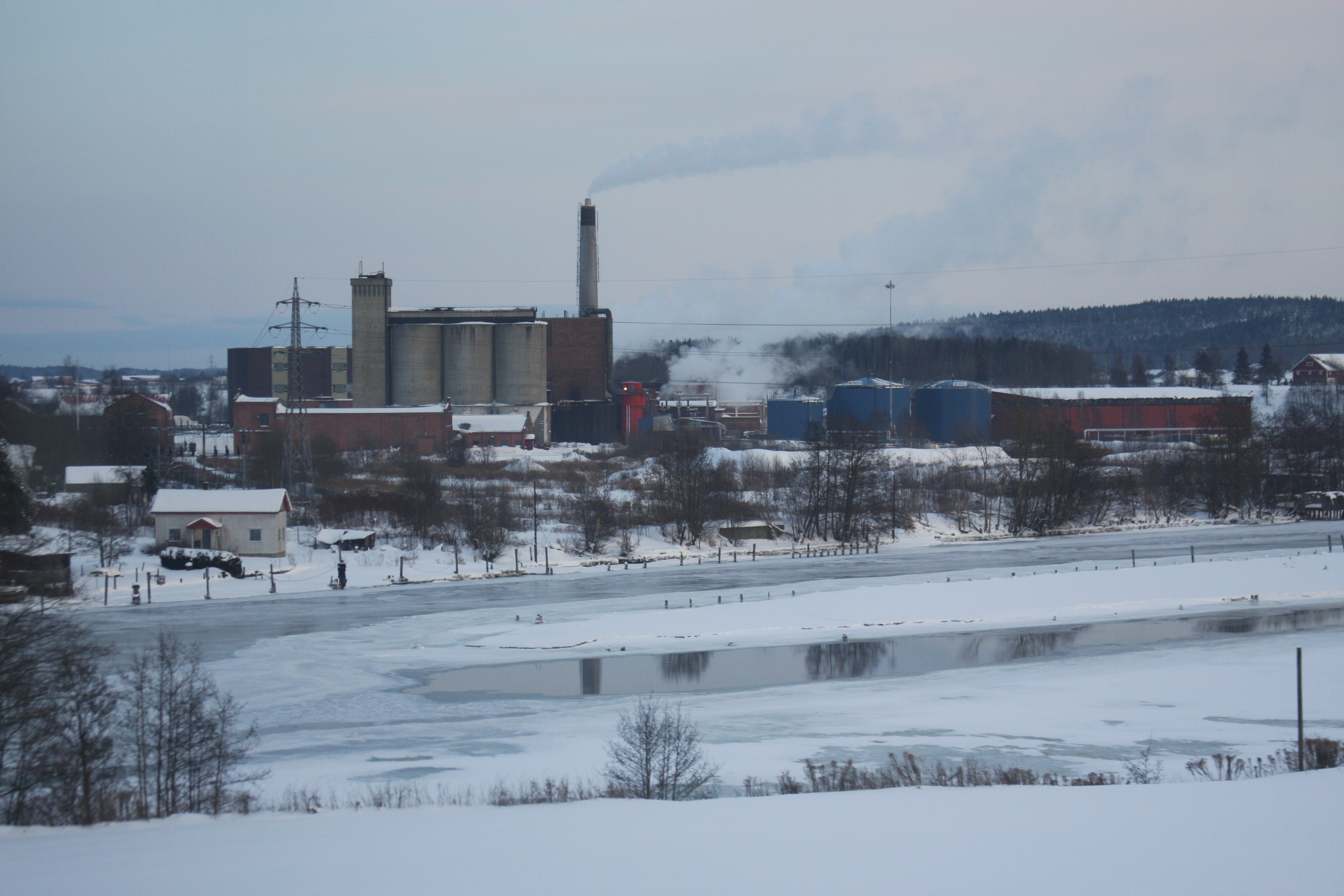
Nordic Paper's factory at Greåker, Norway.

The craft paper producer M. Peterson & Søn retained ownership after the reorganization into Nordic Paper, together with Norske Skog Union's parent Norske Skogindustrier. In 2006 both Peterson and Norske Skogindustrier backed out, in favor of numerous investors.

As a result of the ownership change, the factory in Geithus was closed. However, two kraft paper factories in Bäckhammar and Åmotfors were acquired.
