= Bo Larsson (disambiguation) =

Bo Larsson (1944–2023) was a Swedish footballer.

Bo Larsson may also refer to:

- Bo Larsson (ice hockey) (born 1956), Swedish ice hockey player
- Bo Larsson (water polo) (1927–1977), Swedish water polo player
- Bo Christian Larsson (born 1976), Swedish artist
- Bosse Larsson (Bo Einar Larsson, 1934–2015), Swedish television presenter
