= Rolvsøy (disambiguation) =

Rolvsøy or Rolvsøya may refer to:

== Places ==
- Rolvsøy (municipality), a former municipality in Østfold county, Norway
- Rolvsøy, Finnmark, an island in Måsøy municipality in Finnmark county, Norway
- Rolvsøy, Nordland, an island in Bodø municipality in Nordland county, Norway
- Rolvsøy, Østfold, a village in Fredrikstad municipality in Østfold county, Norway
- Rolvsøy Church, a church in Fredrikstad municipality in Østfold county, Norway
