= Carl Fredrik Fallén =

Swedish botanist and entomologist (1764– 1830)

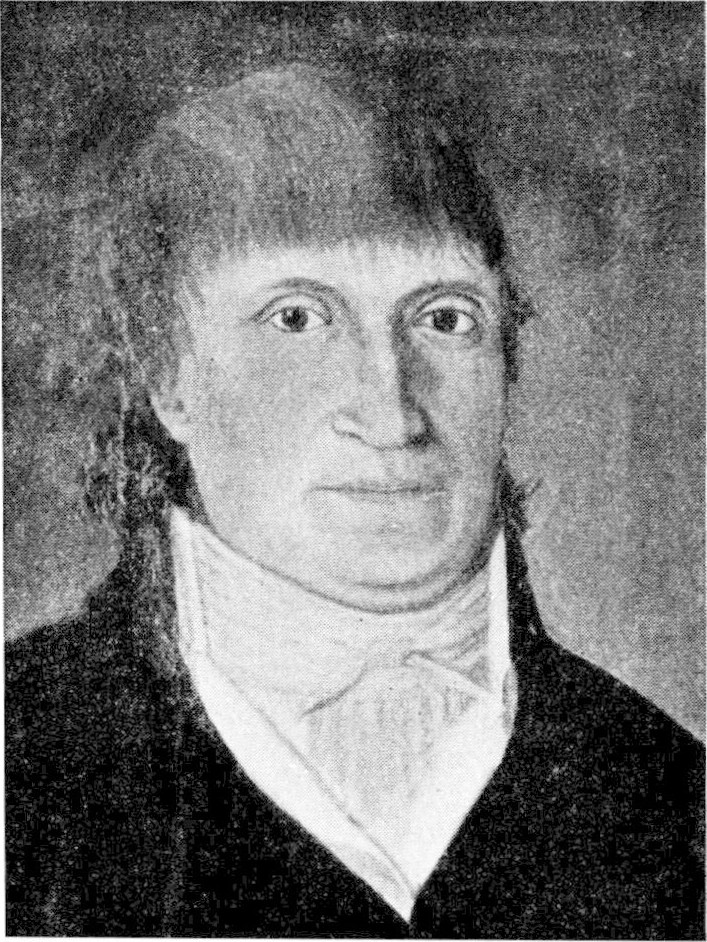
Carl Fredrik Fallén

Carl Fredrik Fallén (born 22 September 1764 in Kristinehamn – 26 August 1830) was a Swedish botanist and entomologist.

Fallén taught at the Lund University. He wrote Diptera Sueciae (1814–27).

Fallén described very many species of Diptera and Hymenoptera.

He was elected a member of the Royal Swedish Academy of Sciences in 1810.

== Publications ==
May be incomplete

- Monographia cimicum Sveciae. Hafniae [= Copenhagen]. 124 p. (1807)
- Specimen entomologicum novam Diptera disponendi methodum exhibens. Berlingianus, Lundae [= Lund]. 26 p. (1810)
- Försök att bestämma de i Sverige funne Flugarter, som kunna föras till Slägtet Tachina. K. Sven. Vetenskapsakad. Handl. (2) 31: 253–87. (1810)
- Specimen Novam Hymenoptera Disponendi Methodum Exhibens. Dissertation. Berling, Lund. pp. 1–41. 1 pl. (1813).
- Beskrifning öfver några i Sverige funna Vattenflugor (Hydromyzides). K. Sven. Vetenskapsakad. Handl. (3) 1: 240–57. (1813)
- 1814. Specimen novam Hemiptera disponendi methodum exhibens. Publicae disquistioni subjicit Magnus Rodhe Lundae. Litteris Berlingianis: 1–26. (1814)
- Beskrifning öfver några Rot-fluge Arter, hörande till slägterna Thereva och Ocyptera. K. Sven. Vetenskapsakad. Handl. (3) 3: 229–40. (1815)
- Syrphici Sveciae [part]. Berling, Lundae [= Lund]. P. 23–62 (1817)
- Scenopinii et Conopsariae Sveciae. Berling, Lundae [= Lund]. 14 p. (1817)
- Beskrifning öfver de i Sverige funna Fluge Arter, som kunna föras till Slägtet Musca. Första Afdelningen. K. Sven. Vetenskapsakad. Handl. (3) 4: 226–54. (1817)
- Heteromyzides Sveciae. Berling, Lundae [= Lund]. 10 p. (1820)
- Opomyzides Sveciae. Berling, Lundae [= Lund]. 12 p. (1820)
- Ortalides Sveciae. Part. III: a et ultima. Berling, Lundae [= Lund]. P. 25–34. (1820)
- Sciomyzides Sveciae. Berling, Lundae [= Lund]. 16 p. (1820)
- Monographia Muscidum Sveciae. Part. V. Berling, Lundae [= Lund]. P. 49–56. (1823)
- Agromyzides Sveciae. Berling, Lundae [= Lund]. 10 p. (1823)
- Hydromyzides Sveciae. Berling, Lundae [=Lund]. 12 p. (1823)
- Geomyzides Sveciae. Berling, Lundae [= Lund]. 8 p. (1823)
- Monographia Dolichopodum Sveciae. Berling, Lundae [= Lund]. 24 p. (1823)
- Phytomyzides et Ochtidiae Sveciae. Berling, Lundae [= Lund]. 10 p. (1823)
- Monographia Muscidum Sveciae. Part IX & ultima. Berling, Lundae [= Lund]. P. 81–94. (18 June) (1825)
- Hemiptera Sveciae. Cimicides eorumque familiae affines. Londini Gothorum [= Lund]. Ex Officina Berlingiana: 1–187. (1829)
