= Environiq Arena =

Event venue in Kristinehamn, Sweden

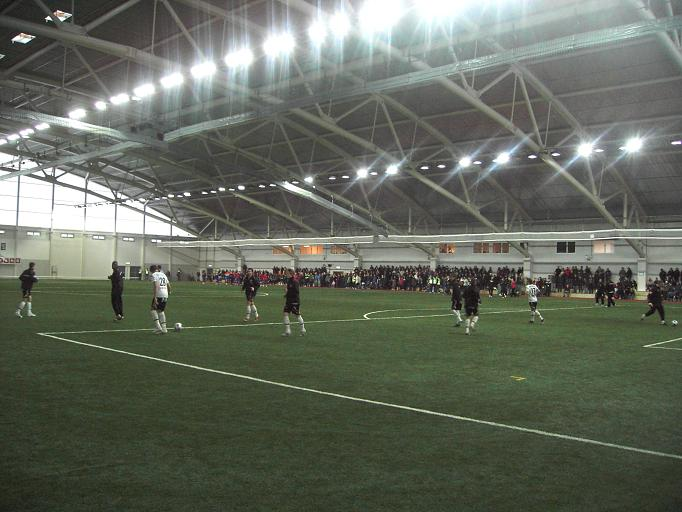
- Interactive map of Environiq Arena
- Location: Arenavägen 3 Kristinehamn, Sweden
- Coordinates: 59°18′40″N 14°05′23″E
- Owner: Idrottsparken i Kristinehamn AB
- Operator: Idrottsparken i Kristinehamn AB
- Capacity: Soccer: 800; Concert: 10,000+

Construction
- Built: 2006–2007
- Opened: November 2, 2007
- Cost: 230 million SEK

Tenant
- IFK Ölme

Environiq Arena is the primary indoor sports and event arena in Kristinehamn, Sweden. The arena opened to the public in 2007.

Environiq Arena has been selected as a championship arena, event arena and exhibition hall. This arena is mainly an indoor football and indoor athletics events.
