= Einstein Kristiansen =

Norwegian cartoonist and designer

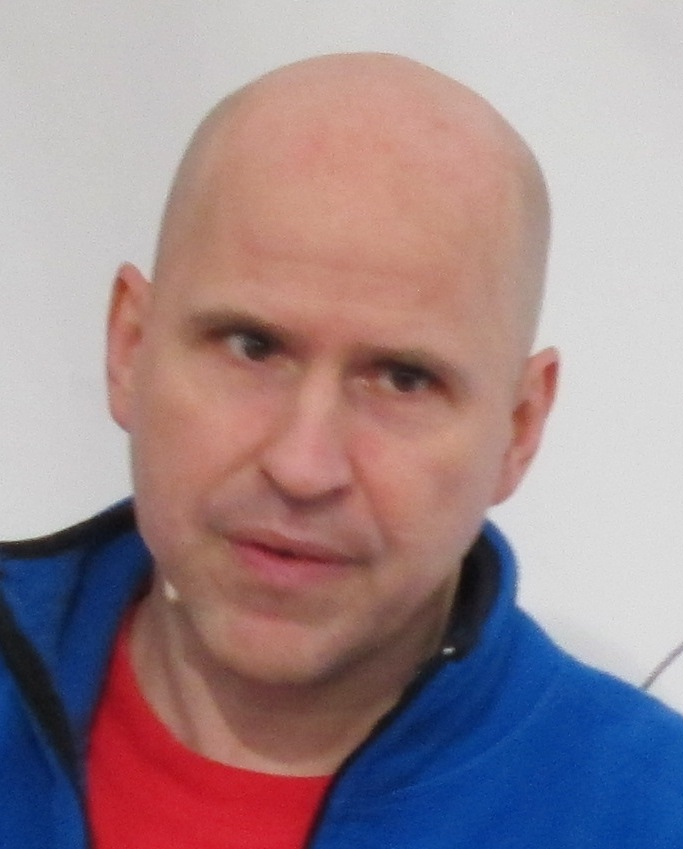
- Kristiansen in 2011
- Born: Øistein Kristiansen; 12 September 1965 (age 59); Greåker, Sarpsborg, Norway
- Occupation: Cartoonist
- Years active: 1984–present
- Website: https://www.oistein.com/

Øistein Kristiansen, formerly known under his artist name Einstein Kristiansen (born 12 September 1965), is a Norwegian cartoonist, designer, entrepreneur, TV host and co-founder of Earthtree Media AS (originally Earthtree Pte Ltd), who together with his two business partners Henry Steed and Mark Hillman, produces children's television programming, animation and image campaigns for MTV Asia, Nickelodeon and Mediacorp. He usually draws with bright colours and exaggerated details.

== History ==
Born in Sarpsborg, Norway, Kristiansen grew up in Greåker, a borough of Sarpsborg. His passion and talent since young was to draw caricatures, an art form of exaggerating certain features of a person's face for comedic effect. His career began at age 9 when he draw a cartoon depicting a Norwegian farmland which became featured in the front page of his school newsletter.

After leaving school at age 19, he became a freelance illustrator drawing caricatures of people on the streets. He formed a graphic design company at age 21 and studied at Joe Kubert School of Cartoon and Graphic Arts for a year at age 22. Later, he began publishing illustrations for various clients including Vogue, ELLE, Mad Magazine Sesame Street and The New Paper.

A keen traveller, in 1991, Kristiansen began backpacking through Southeast Asia. Being short of money, he was supposed to be a cartoonist in Bangkok as a temporary gig. While on transit at Changi Airport, he went on a spontaneous bus tour of Singapore and fell in love with its mix of traditional and modern elements. He eventually settled in Singapore, with his first job of drawing caricatures at Laughs Comedy Club. He draw caricatures by day, and do comedy sets at night. From his stay in Singapore, he went from becoming a regular cartoonist to being an entertainer. He also earned a new name, Einstein. At age 27, he formed his own design company called Square Eggs and in 1993, he held his first exhibition on how cartoons are used in other art forms.

Gaining from his stage presence at the comedy club, Kristiansen's television career in Singapore began in the mid-1990s as an extra for Mediacorp drama productions, including as a guest in Hip-O and Friends. His proper debut began in 2000 with Art Factory, airing on Kids Central. An arts and crafts comedy show aimed at children inspired by Art Attack, it lasted three seasons.

Due to the success of Art Factory, Kristiansen decided to produce his own shows through his company Earthtree Media. Cows n Crayons debuted in 2003 on the same channel, using the cow as "a nod to the transformative power of creativity". It was followed by Super Einstein, where Kristiansen portrayed a superhero who "saved the world with art". Later, he, along with a group of children, became a chef in Einstein's Tingkat, where they "would draw the dishes they wanted to cook before bringing the recipes to life". Kristiansen also produced the reality TV competition Doodlechamps, where "young artists selected from schools across Singapore participating in challenges to transform random squiggles into creative doodle art".

In 2005, Kristiansen appeared in a self-funded series of live action shorts called "Right on Top". The series was transmitted on the Nickelodeon Southeast Asia feed. One season of "Art Mad", the show's long form, has been purchased for broadcast by German corporation Faber-Castell for transmission in Indonesia.

While still living in Singapore, Kristiansen created an animated series called That's Imagination in 2008 which aired on Norwegian television, which opened up opportunities for his company. Kristiansen moved back to Norway in 2010.

In 2011, Kristiansen started a YouTube channel named "Box Yourself". On the channel he posts tutorials on how to create various items with cardboard. The channel was started in 2011, but he did not post until 2014. The channel has since gained 750,000 subscribers as of January 2025. In the channel description, Kristiansen describes the channel like this, "Think it, Make it! Box Yourself inspires kids all over the world to see themselves as designers, creators and makers. We make design easy, engaging and fun."

He published a book entitled "Draw Robots with Øistein Kristiansen: Get The World To Draw! (Learn To Draw)" in March 2014.

== TV programs ==
- Art Factory (Kids Central, 2000)
- Cows n Crayons (Kids Central, 2003)
- The Adventures of Super Einstein
- Einstein's Tingkat
- Doodlechamps
- Right on Top
- Art Mad
- Wild About Cartoons
- Christmas with Øistein
- That's Imagination (produced for Norwegian television, 2008)
- Learn to Draw (2012)
- Box Yourself (2013)
- Box Yourself Minis (2015-2016)
- Learn to Draw Minis (2014-2016)
- Doodle (2015)
- Box Ideas (YouTube channel, 2017)

== Company name change due to legal concerns ==
Kristiansen's company, Earthtree Pte Ltd, was originally known as Einstein's Earthtree Pte Ltd. However, lawyers from The Roger Richman Agency, on behalf of The Hebrew University of Jerusalem, issued warning letters to protect the image and identity of Albert Einstein. The lawyers also contested his use of the moniker "Einstein Kristiansen", and so in 2007, he changed his professional name back to his original name, Øistein Kristiansen.
