= Björneborg =

Björneborg may refer to:

- Björneborg, Sweden
- the Swedish name of Pori, city of Finland
