= Johan Ström =

Swedish footballer

Personal information
- Date of birth: 22 June 1971 (age 55)
- Position: Defender

Senior career*
Years	Team	Apps	(Gls)
1990–1995	Degerfors IF		
1998	IFK Ölme		
1999–2000	Degerfors IF		
- * Club domestic league appearances and goals

Johan Ström (born 22 June 1971) is a Swedish retired football defender.
