= Greaker Industrier =

Norwegian company

Greaker Industrier AS
- Industry: Paper industry
- Founded: 1905
- Fate: Bought by M. Peterson & Søn, 1979
- Headquarters: Greåker, Norway

Greaker Industrier AS was a Norwegian industrial company, which ran a paper mill in Sarpsborg, Norway.

It was founded by Cæsar Bang in 1905 as Greaker Cellulosefabrik. A 1972 bankrupt caused a slight reorganization, and the name Greaker Industrier was taken. In 1979 the company was acquired by M. Peterson & Søn. Its main product being greaseproof paper, it was separated from the packaging and solid board branches of M. Peterson & Søn in 1997 under the name Peterson Scanproof. In 2001 it was merged with an entity owned by Norske Skog Union to constitute the company Nordic Paper, placed under joint ownership of M. Peterson & Søn and Norske Skogindustrier. Both owners backed out of Nordic Paper in 2006.
