= Cæsar Bang =

Norwegian businessman

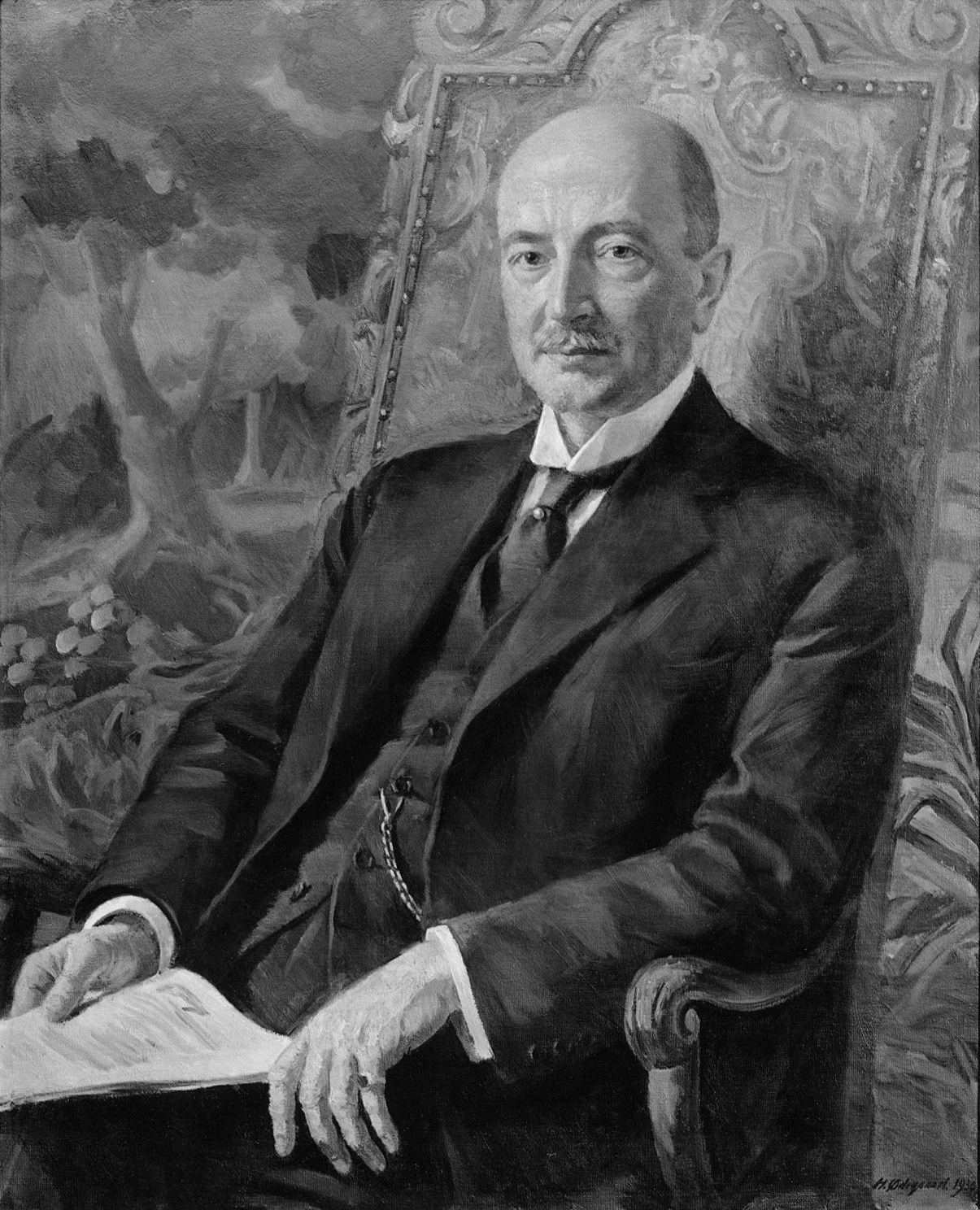
An oil painting of Bang by Hans Ødegaard

Cæsar Boeck Bang (8 February 1870 – October 1951) was a Norwegian businessman.

== Biography ==
Cæsar Boeck Bang was born at Drammen in Buskerud, Norway. He finished Kristiania Commerce School (now Oslo Commerce School) in 1888 and later studied abroad. From 1895 to 1901, he worked as a manager for Hillringsberg which consisted of a foundry and saw mills in Värmland, Sweden. From 1902 to 1905, he worked at the power company Hafslund Sulfitfabrik. In 1905 he founded the paper mill Greaker Cellulosefabrik in Sarpsborg and became manager there.

He was the chairman of Norsk Celluloseforening from 1915 to 1918, a central board member of the Norwegian Employers' Confederation from 1915 to 1925 and president of the Federation of Norwegian Industries from 1924 to 1927. He was a member of the Norwegian Industrial Property Office and the boards of Oslo Sparebank and the Norwegian America Line. He was also a consul-general for Austria from 1928. After his death he was buried at Vestre gravlund in October 1951.

Business positions
Preceded by Christian Emil Stoud Platou	President of the Federation of Norwegian Industries; 1923–1927	Succeeded by Hans Blom Peterson
