= Ölme =

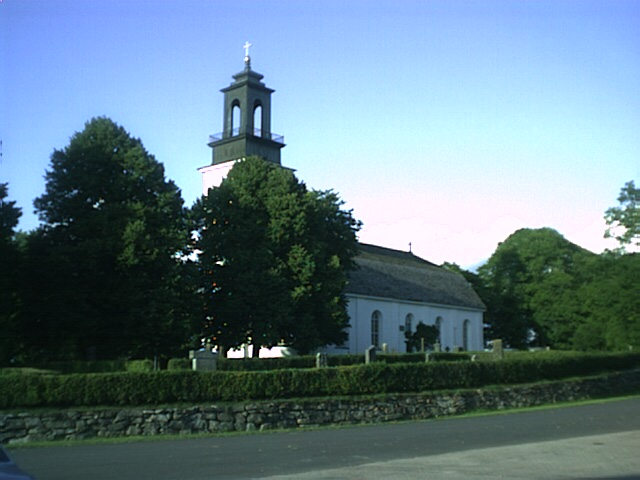
- Ölme Church

- Location within Sweden
- Coordinates: 59°21′50″N 14°00′30″E
- Country: Sweden
- Province: Värmland
- County: Värmland County
- Municipality: Kristinehamn Municipality

Area
  - Total: 0.31 km^{2} (0.12 sq mi)

Population (31 December 2010)
  - Total: 224
  - Density: 725/km^{2} (1,880/sq mi)
- Time zone: UTC+1 (CET)
  - Summer (DST): UTC+2 (CEST)

Ölme is a locality situated in Kristinehamn Municipality, Värmland County, Sweden with 224 inhabitants in 2010.
