= Kristinehamn Municipality =

Kristinehamn Municipality Kristinehamns kommun
- Municipality
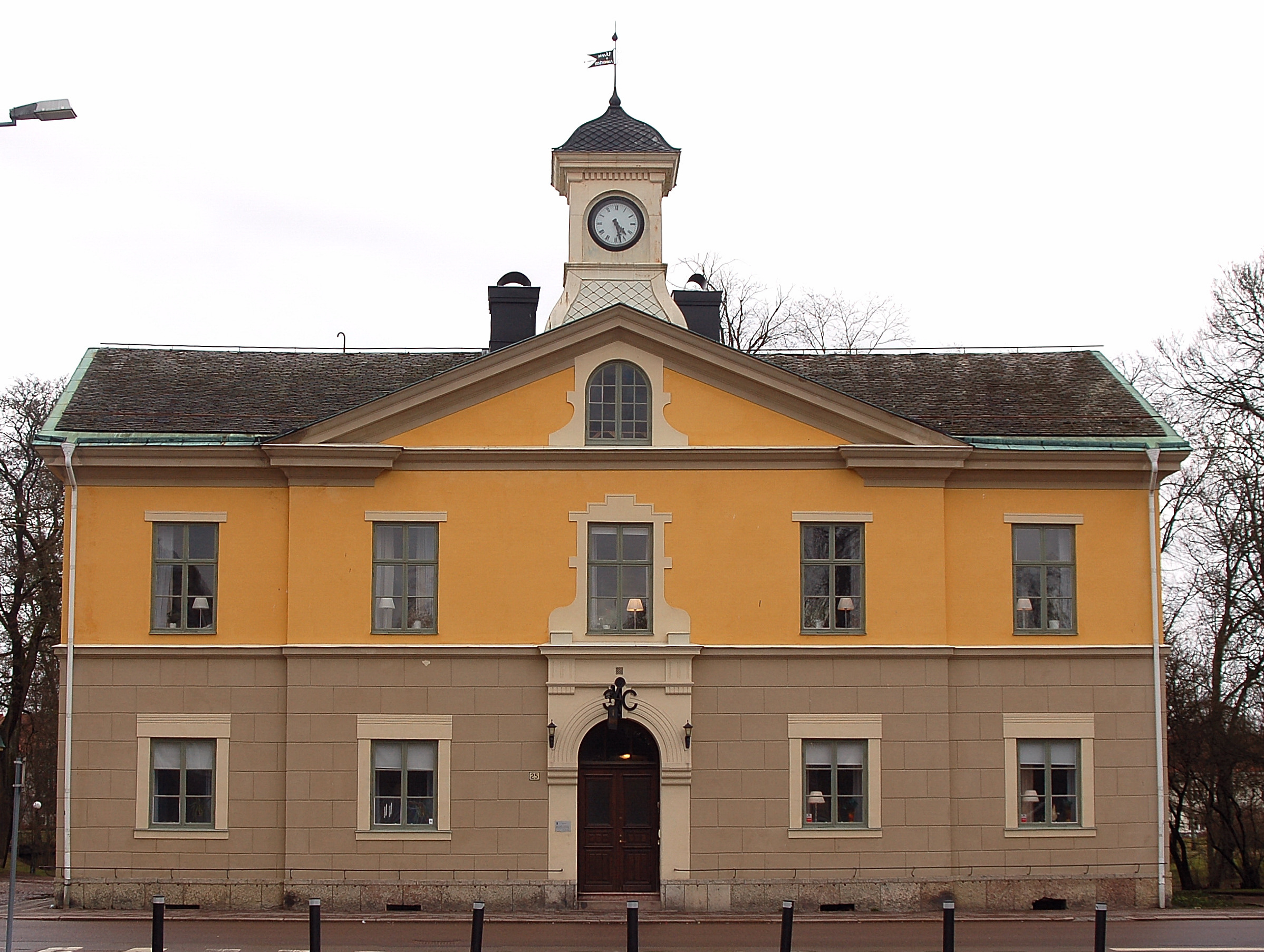
- Kristinehamn City Hall

- Coat of arms

- Coordinates: 59°18′N 14°07′E
- Country: Sweden
- County: Värmland County
- Seat: Kristinehamn

Area
  - Total: 1,384.44 km^{2} (534.54 sq mi)
  - Land: 753.12 km^{2} (290.78 sq mi)
  - Water: 631.32 km^{2} (243.75 sq mi)
- Area as of 1 January 2014.

Population (30 June 2025)
  - Total: 23,715
  - Density: 31.489/km^{2} (81.556/sq mi)
- Time zone: UTC+1 (CET)
  - Summer (DST): UTC+2 (CEST)
- ISO 3166 code: SE
- Province: Värmland
- Municipal code: 1781
- Website: www.kristinehamn.se

Kristinehamn Municipality (Swedish: Kristinehamns kommun) is a municipality in Värmland County in west central Sweden. Its seat is located in the city of Kristinehamn.

The present municipality was created in 1971 when the former City of Kristinehamn was merged with parts of the two dissolved rural municipalities Visnum and Väse.

== Localities ==
- Kristinehamn (seat)
- Björneborg
- Bäckhammar
- Ölme

== Sites of interest ==
- The medieval island of Saxholmen, situated in the beautiful archipelago of Kristinehamn. There have been several archaeological excavations on the island during the past few years. There is a myth that once the cruel and hateful Saxe av Sachsen lived on the island with his wife and servants. His wife took off with her lover.
- Östervik chapel is a unique small church which has a fascinating history and architecture.
- Folk museum, the red-painted houses made of wood, the rushing of the water, and the bleating of the sheep make altogether a wonderful atmosphere and give you a memorable visit. Lundbomsgården is a middle-class home from the 19th century, the mill from the early 17th century.
- Värmlands Säby manor house has typical 18th century qualities with beautiful tiled stoves and painted tapestries. There is also a unique hedge maze consisting of 1,747 bushes.

== Demographics ==
This is a demographic table based on Kristinehamn Municipality's electoral districts in the 2022 Swedish general election sourced from SVT's election platform, in turn taken from SCB official statistics.

In total there were 24,083 residents, including 18,945 Swedish citizens of voting age. 51.2% voted for the left coalition and 47.7% for the right coalition. Indicators are in percentage points except population totals and income.

Location	Residents	Citizen adults	Left vote	Right vote	Employed	Swedish parents	Foreign heritage	Income SEK	Degree
Location			%	%					
Björneborg	1,198	880	53.6	45.1	64	74	26	20,654	20
Djurgården	1,623	1,246	51.0	47.4	81	86	14	24,962	38
Enserud	1,191	993	56.3	42.4	66	78	22	18,782	28
Fältet	1,391	1,062	50.7	48.6	80	85	15	26,136	40
Innerstaden	1,787	1,294	66.6	32.5	54	55	45	16,351	26
Kristinehamn NÖ	1,492	1,253	50.2	48.3	77	88	12	23,973	36
Kristinehamn N	1,404	1,112	48.9	50.5	84	91	9	27,645	38
Kristinehamn S	1,995	1,617	43.6	55.9	77	89	11	22,223	29
Kristinehamn Ö	2,273	1,744	52.8	46.7	84	88	12	26,637	39
Kurlanda	1,622	1,263	46.8	52.7	74	86	14	23,601	28
Stenstaliden	1,991	1,583	54.6	43.7	70	82	18	20,884	33
Strand	1,469	1,072	46.9	51.6	79	89	11	26,228	39
Södermalm	1,949	1,503	55.8	42.7	66	71	29	19,830	29
Ölme	1,464	1,200	46.7	52.8	83	94	6	27,258	38
Ö Vålösundet	1,234	1,123	48.0	51.1	75	86	14	22,243	38
Source: SVT

== Elections ==
These are the results of the elections in the municipality since the first election after the municipal reform, being held in 1973. The exact results of Sweden Democrats were not listed at a municipal level by SCB from 1988 to 1998 due to the party's small size at the time. "Turnout" denotes the percentage of eligible people casting any ballots, whereas "Votes" denotes the number of valid votes only.

=== Riksdag ===
Year	Turnout	Votes	V	S	MP	C	L	KD	M	SD	ND
1973	91.6	18,158	5.3	49.7	0.0	21.9	10.0	1.3	11.6	0.0	0.0
1976	92.5	18,977	4.2	47.7	0.0	22.7	10.9	1.2	13.1	0.0	0.0
1979	90.8	18,498	5.0	49.6	0.0	16.4	11.0	1.1	16.7	0.0	0.0
1982	91.8	18,487	4.9	53.2	1.1	13.3	6.2	1.4	19.8	0.0	0.0
1985	89.6	18,125	5.3	51.8	1.1	10.9	13.5	0.0	17.3	0.0	0.0
1988	85.3	17,040	6.1	50.5	4.3	10.5	12.7	2.1	13.7	0.0	0.0
1991	86.3	17,061	4.7	45.0	2.5	7.8	9.0	6.2	16.1	0.0	8.3
1994	87.2	17,156	7.3	52.5	4.3	6.8	7.0	3.2	17.5	0.0	1.0
1998	81.8	15,677	15.5	42.7	3.9	5.0	4.5	10.1	16.6	0.0	0.0
2002	81.2	14,888	9.5	42.0	4.2	8.6	12.2	8.3	12.0	1.4	0.0
2006	81.9	15,131	7.3	43.6	3.6	8.6	6.4	5.5	20.6	2.5	0.0
2010	84.6	15,925	6.3	40.6	5.5	6.1	6.1	4.4	25.4	4.5	0.0
2014	86.2	16,173	5.6	41.2	5.1	6.3	4.8	3.8	19.3	11.4	0.0
2018	86.8	16,088	7.6	34.1	3.0	8.8	5.5	5.9	16.0	18.0	0.0

Blocs

This lists the relative strength of the socialist and centre-right blocs since 1973, but parties not elected to the Riksdag are inserted as "other", including the Sweden Democrats results from 1988 to 2006, but also the Christian Democrats pre-1991 and the Greens in 1982, 1985 and 1991. The sources are identical to the table above. The coalition or government mandate marked in bold formed the government after the election. New Democracy got elected in 1991 but are still listed as "other" due to the short lifespan of the party.

Year	Turnout	Votes	Left	Right	SD	Other	Elected
1973	91.6	18,158	**55.0**	43.5	0.0	1.5	98.5
1976	92.5	18,977	51.9	**46.7**	0.0	1.4	98.6
1979	90.8	18,498	54.6	**44.1**	0.0	1.3	98.7
1982	91.8	18,487	**58.1**	39.3	0.0	2.6	97.4
1985	89.6	18,125	**57.1**	41.7	0.0	1.2	98.8
1988	85.3	17,040	**60.9**	36.9	0.0	2.2	97.8
1991	86.3	17,061	49.7	**39.1**	0.0	11.2	97.1
1994	87.2	17,156	**64.1**	34.5	0.0	1.4	98.6
1998	81.8	15,677	**62.1**	36.2	0.0	1.7	98.3
2002	81.2	14,888	**55.7**	41.1	0.0	3.2	96.8
2006	81.9	15,131	54.5	**41.1**	0.0	4.4	95.6
2010	84.6	15,925	52.4	**42.0**	4.5	1.1	98.9
2014	86.2	16,173	**51.9**	34.2	11.4	2.5	97.5
2018	86.8	16,088	**44.7**	36.1	18.0	1.3	98.7

== International relations ==
=== Twin towns — Sister cities ===
The municipality is twinned with:

- Brodnica, Poland (since 2003)
- Elva, Estonia (since 1992)
- Farsund, Norway (since 1945)
- Rautavaara, Finland (since 1971)
- Seinäjoki, Finland (since 1945)
- Skagen, Denmark
