= Rolvsøy =

Village in Østfold, Norway

Coordinates: 59°16′N 11°01′E

Rolvsøy is a village, an island, and a former municipality in Østfold county, Norway.

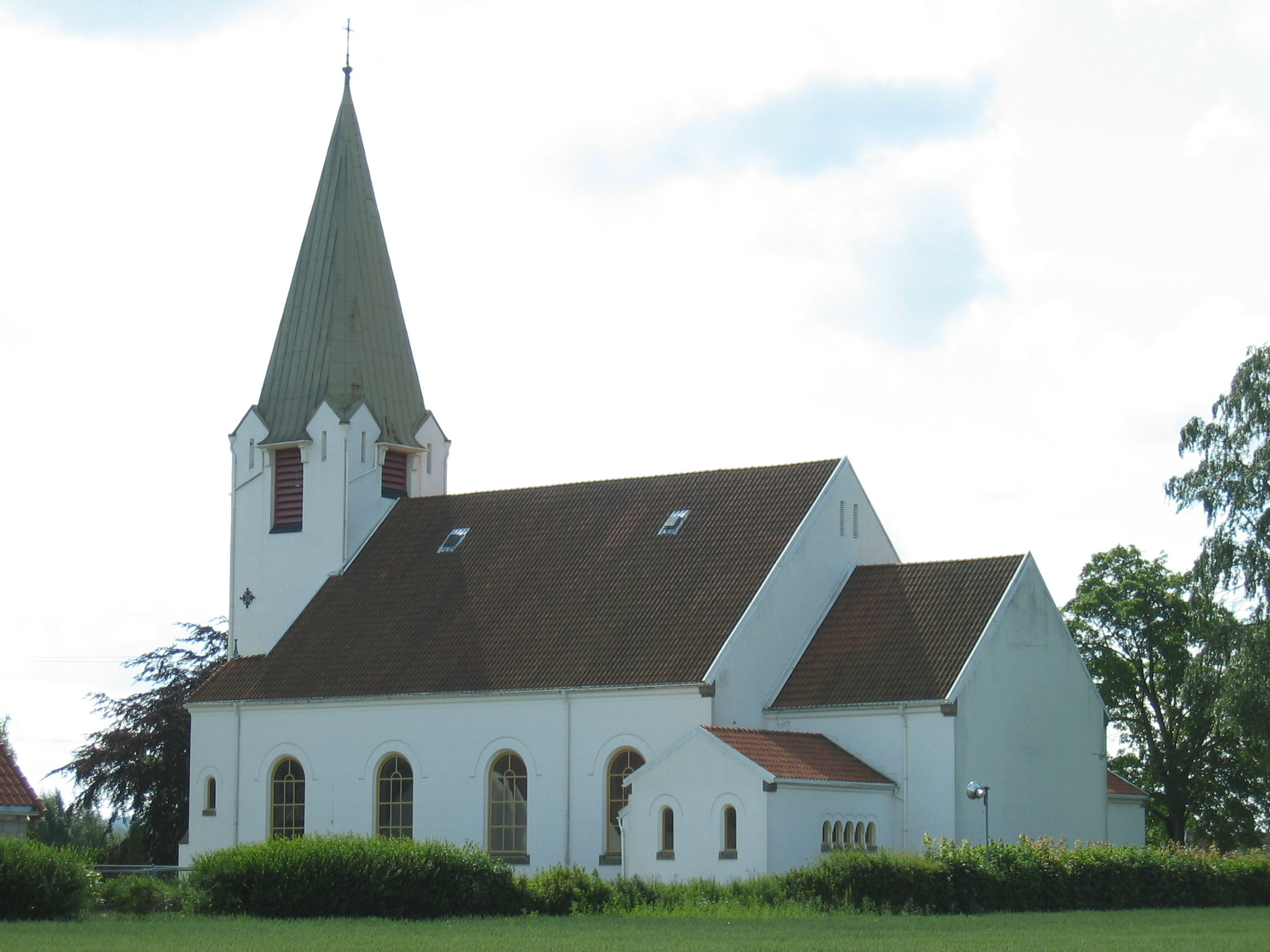
Rolvsøy church

It was created by a split from Tune on 1 January 1911. At that time Rolvsøy had a population of 2,381. On 1 January 1994 Rolvsøy was incorporated into the municipality of Fredrikstad, the neighboring municipality to the south. Prior to the merger Rolvsøy had a population of 5,947.

The Tune ship, a viking ship dating from ca. 900 and now exhibited in the Viking Ship Museum in Bygdøy, Oslo was found in Rolvsøy in 1867. It was so named because it was found in a boat burial mound on Rolvsøy which was a part of Tune at that time.

== The name ==
The Norse form of the name was (probably) *Rolfsøy. The first element is then the genitive case of the male name Rolfr, the last element is 'øy' meaning 'island'.

== Development ==
Rolvsøy has been and is still under heavy development, especially the street called Dikeveien. Before 1990, the street had little more than a few factories. Today the street is full of life, with over 100 stores. Everything from tiles, groceries and clothing. Dikeveien is located in Fredrikstad, and lies 6 km north of the city centre.
