= Bo Christian Larsson =

Swedish artist (born 1976)

Bo Christian Larsson (born 1976 in Kristinehamn, Sweden) is a Swedish artist who works mostly with large-sized drawings, installations, performances and objects.

Born in 1976 in Sweden, Larsson entered the AKI Academy of Visual Arts in 1994 Enschede, Holland. In 1997 he was an exchange student at Western Australia's College of Fine Arts in Perth, Australia. In 1998, he finished at AKI.

From 2004 to 2008 he lived and worked in Munich, Germany, then moved Hamburg, where he achieved the Philipp Otto Runge Scholarship for one year.

Larsson lives and works in Älvkarhed, Sweden and Berlin, Germany.

== Commentary ==
Stephanie Rosenthal, curator: "Although the Swedish artist works with obvious symbolism, his work remains mystic and arcane and reminds one of a foreign land that wants to be discovered." in: Favoriten 08. Neue Kunst in München, exh.cat., Lenbachhaus, Munich, Germany, pp.70 – 75.

Bo Christian Larrson: "I think this is the only costume you can wear at all, it makes so little and so much with your body at the same time. No big deal. You put on the wig and you are a different person. This has always fascinated me. I have the wig in front of my eyes. I turn it around, so I can't see anything. This is a very important point in my performances, that I blind myself and have to take a look inside. I become a different person and disappear in this role." (Interview on Bavarian Radio, 24.06.2008)

Stephanie Rosenthal, curator: "Rites of passage are specifically important in Larsson's work. This phase stands for „already-loosening" of the old condition and "not-yet-arrived" in a new condition. In this "twilight-zone" there are the most possibilities to new thoughts. It seems as if Larsson wants to remain there. He becomes a border crosser, an intermediate being, passing through a permanent process of transformation." (in: Favoriten 08. Neue Kunst in München, exh.cat., Lenbachhaus, Munich, Germany, pp.70 – 75)

Bo Christian Larsson: "I feel uncomfortable as a human in our time. That's why I hardly create new products, but try using already existent material." (SZ newspaper, 26./27.01.2008 in „Der Mann aus dem Wald")

== Exhibitions ==
=== Selected solo exhibitions ===
- 2015: Bo Christian Larsson, Galleri Bo Bjerggaard, Copenhagen
- 2014: Bo Christian Larsson, TS Art Projects, Berlin
- 2013: Bo Christian Larsson, DH-Artworks, Düsseldorf, Germany
- 2013: Bo Christian Larsson, Institut für moderne kunst-Nuremberg, Germany
- 2013: Bo Christian Larsson, Schaustelle Pinakothek der Moderne, Munich, Germany
- 2013: Bo Christian Larsson, TS Art Projects, Berlin, Germany
- 2013: Bo Christian Larsson, Borås Art Museum, Borås, Sweden
- 2012: Bo Christian Larsson, Christian Larsen Gallery, Stockholm, Sweden
- 2012: Bo Christian Larsson, Ludlow 38, New York City, USA
- 2012: Bo Christian Larsson, Gallery Vogt, New York City, USA
- 2012: Bo Christian Larsson, Kalmar Konstmuseum, Sweden
- 2012: Bo Christian Larsson, Kristinehamns Konstmuseum, Sweden
- 2010: Cataclysmic Raft, Performance on Sylt, Kunstraum Sylt Quelle, Germany
- 2010: A White Mess Pt. 2b, Soundfair, Berlin, Germany
- 2010: Open Space, Art Cologne, Cologne, Germany
- 2010: The Intruder, Tongewoelbe T25, Ingolstadt, Germany
- 2009: Drifting Across That Thin Line, Steinle Contemporary, Munich, Germany
- 2009: For Earthly Things..., Magazin4, Bregenzer Kunstverein, Bregenz, Austria (Sept. 2009)
- 2008: Silverscreams, Gallery Gad, Oslo, Norway
- 2008: What was made in the dark, will be brought to the light, Galerie Florian Walch, Munich, Germany
- 2006: An Itchy Howl Under a Skin Coloured Moon, Von Maltzahn Fine Arts, Munich, Germany
- 2006: a mediocre squirt in a commonplace tilts the real, Gallery GAD, Oslo, Norway
- 2005: Oil for food, Fuel for fools, Off Space Du Ag, Munich, Germany

=== Selected group exhibitions, happenings and performances ===
- 2016: 20th Biennale of Sydney, Sydney NSW
- 2015: Time Lies – KIK Seven, Kino International, Berlin
- 2015: Navigare necesse est – Seefahrt tut Not, Schaufenster, Berlin
- 2015: Borås – Västerås Tur och Retur, Västerås konstmuseum, Västerås
- 2015: Tech 4 Change, Vestfossen Kunstlaboratorium, Vestfossen (cat.)
- 2015: Alma Löv Museum CIA, Östr. Ämtervik, Sweden
- 2014: Stipend Exhibition, Teater Galleriet, Off Konsten, Uppsala
- 2014: All creatures small and great, C.H.ART Christina Haubs, Munich
- 2014: Alma Löv Museum CIA, Östr. Ämtervik
- 2014: Grooving Images, TS Art Projects, Berlin
- 2014: Borås International Sculpture Biennale, Borås
- 2014: Protect me From What I am, Galerie Dina Renninger, Munich
- 2014: Skoteinos, Pavilion, Bad Gastein
- 2014: Skoteinos, Worldroom 42, Munich
- 2014: About Sculpture #2, Gallery Rolando Anselmi, Berlin
- 2014: Symphonie Plastique, Le Carré de Vincennes, Vincennes
- 2014: Drive the Change, 100plus, Zurich
- 2013: Overcoming History, Galerie Schmidt-Handrup, Berlin
- 2013: Overcoming History, Galerie Schmidt-Handrup, Cologne
- 2013: Approdo al futuro, Palazzo Orlando, Livorno
- 2013: New Positions, Art Cologne, Cologne
- 2013: Welovepaintings, DH-Artworks, Düsseldorf
- 2013: Manche mögen’s schwer, DH-Artworks, Düsseldorf
- 2012: himmelgrau., Galerie Bezirk Oberbayern, Munich
- 2012: Im Raum des Betrachters / Skulptur der Gegenwart, Pinakothek der Moderne, Munich
- 2012: EORUM SANAI, Arario Gallery, Cheonan
- 2012: Socle du Monde Biennale, Herning Museum of Contemporary Art, Herning
- 2012: Falling From Grace – Junge Schwedische Kunst, Rostock Kunsthalle
- 2011: Jahresgaben 2011, Kunstverein München, Munich
- 2011: Jahresgaben 2011, Braunschweiger Kunstverein, Braunschweig
- 2011: Hot Spot Berlin, Georg Kolbe Museum, Berlin
- 2011: The True Artist Helps the World by Revealing Magic Truths, D21 Art Space, Leipzig
- 2011: Colliding Discourses, Shiryaevo Biennal, Samara
- 2011: Eyes Wide Shut, Vogt Gallery, New York
- 2011: Into the Wildwoods, Galleri Bo Bjerggaard, Copenhagen
- 2011: Unlängst im Wald, Bayerische Staatsforsten, Regensburg
- 2010: Petersburg, Available Works at HBC, Karl-Liebknecht-Str. 9, Berlin, Germany
- 2010: Hayward Closure Poster Project, Hayward Gallery London, UK
- 2010: Tales from the forest, Virserums Konsthall, Virserum, Sweden
- 2010: Gegenüber und Miteinander, Kunstprojekt auf dem Weg zum ÖKT 2010, Munich, Germany
- 2009: Jahresgaben 2009, Kunstverein München, Munich, Germany
- 2009: Interesting Productions, The Office, Berlin, Germany
- 2009: Walking in my mind, Hayward Gallery, London, UK
- 2009: Extra Extra, China Art Objects Galleries, Los Angeles, USA
- 2009: Minton's Playhouse, Artnews Projects, Berlin, Germany, organized by: Caravan Berlin
- 2008: Indifference, Forum Kreuzberg, Skalitzer Str. 133, Berlin, Germany
- 2008: The waste land, caravan Berlin, Berlin, Germany
- 2008: Out There in the middle of nowhere, Galerie Der Künstler, Munich, Germany
- 2008: Favoriten 2008, Kunstbau, Lenbachhaus, Munich, Germany
- 2008: Interesting Productions III, The Fortress of Day and Night, ZK-Max München, Munich, Germany
- 2008: Hell-O-World pt. 1 (Sweden), Happening in Kristinehmans Konstfoerening, Sweden
- 2008: Toy-Void, A performative identity project as a part of "Doing Identity", Kammerspiele München, Munich Germany
- 2008: Interesting Productions II, shown in the collection of Lenbachhaus, Munich, Germany
- 2007: Königskinder, Residenzmuseum, Munich, Germany
- 2007: B. Line, Ter Caemer-Meert Contemporary, Nieuwerke, Belgium
- 2007: Our House Reverbed, performance in Nacht Linie-Kammerspiele, Kammerspiele München, Munich Germany
- 2007: I can eat that, Providence RI, USA
- 2006: Interesting Productions II, Three man show in "Lothringer 13", Munich, Germany
- 2006: Out, Household and Birds-reinventions of A. Kaprow's Happenings as a part of the exhibition "Allan Kaprow" in Haus der Kunst, Munich Germany
- 2006: daydream demolition (a speculation), performance as a part of the theater piece "Bunny Hill 2", Kammerspiele München, Munich Germany
- 2006: Bonnie Prince German, Low Salt Gallery, Glasgow, Scotland
- 2006: Panic, our older brother, Gallery ALM, Munich, Germany
- 2005: kkk becomes santa…REDIALLED, performance as a part of the exhibition "kunstlerbruder", Haus der Kunst, Munich, Germany
- 2005: Imagen, luz y sonido para el desarollo, Centre civic Barcelonetta, Barcelona, Spain
- 2005: Copy your idol, Organized by the Berlin Foundation of Contemporary art, Kunsthalle Berlin Pankow, Berlin, Germany
- 2005: kkk becomes santa and santa becomes kkk, performance in the exhibition "Experiment Dunstkreis", Westendstr., Munich, Germany
- 2005: On a road to permanent demonstration, Utopia Station in World Social Forum, Porto Alegre, Brazil
- 2005: If Spiderman is real, so is Utopia!, Performance in "Utopia Station", Haus der Kunst, Munich Germany
- 2004: Voids and Fillings, Kellereingang Ost of Haus der Kunst, Munich, Germany
- 2004: Young artist, Kristinehamns konstmuseum, Kristinehamn, Sweden
- 2003/04: Now and then, Kristinehamns konstmuseum, Kristinehamn, Sweden
- 2002: Mindmapping happening, EMPIRE Global Mobile, Berlin, Tokyo, New York, Haus des Lehrers, Berlin, Germany
- 2002: Mindmapping Video project on the Four seasons hotel in Berlin
- 2002: The human body in return, Alma Lövs museum of unexpected art in Östra Ämtervik, Sweden
- 2002: Stockholm Art-Fair on sollentunamässan, Stockholm, Sweden
- 2002: Young artist, Kristinehamns konstmuseum, Kristinehamn, Sweden
- 2001: Project Mindmapping FfM, Künstlerhaus Mousonturm, Frankfurt/Main, Germany
- 2001: Performance Falling down REDUX, Künstlerhaus Mousonturm, Frankfurt/Main, Germany
- 2001: Performance Engraved episodes, with Leif Alexis, Treptower Park, Berlin, Germany
- 2001: Scholarship exhibition on Kristinehamns museum of modern art (received a letter of honor)
- 2000: Supposedly forgotten, Performance on the Ullriken mountain in Bergen, Norway
- 2000: Petra Jensen, Jonas Liveröd, B. Christian Larsson, Kristinehamns art hall, Kristinehamns, Sweden
- 2000: Holland, what makes things go-go?, Väsby art hall, Upplands väsby, Sweden
- 1999: Future park, AIAS Int. Artist seminary in Amsterdam, Holland
- 1998: B. Christian Larsson and Johannes Buss, Gallerie de Villa, Enschede, Holland
- 1998: Group examination exhibition on the AKI, Enschede, Holland
- 1998: Liljevalchs spring exhibition 1998
- 1997: Everything is duty-free in Eden, Gallery De R.A.T, Enschede, Holland
- 1997: Sculpture survey, Gomboc Gallery, Perth, Australia

== Grants and awards ==
- 2014: Swedish Arts Council Artist Stipend, Stockholm, Sweden
- 2013: VHV-Gruppe, Artist of the year, Hannover, Germany
- 2012: Premio Combat 2012 Prize, Livorno, Italy (category painting)
- 2010: flux factory Residency Scholarship, New York, USA
- 2009: Kunst:Raum Sylt Quelle, artist in residence, Sylt, Germany
- 2008/09: Philipp Otto Runge Scholarship, Hamburg, Germany
- 2006: Musik in öffentlichen Raum, Kulturreferat München, Munich, Germany
- 2002: Young artist, Kristinehamns konstmuseum, Kristinehamn, Sweden

== Collections ==
- -- VHV, Hannover, Germany
- -- Borås Konstmuseum, Borås, Sweden
- -- FRAC Ile-de-France, Le Plateau, Paris, France
- -- Hamburger Kunsthalle, Kupferstichkabinett, Hamburg, Germany
- 2008: Pinakothek der Moderne, Munich, Germany
- 2008: Staatliche Graphische Sammlung München, Munich, Germany
- 2006: Städtische Galerie im Lenbachhaus, Munich, Germany
- 2006: Hans Mayer, Düsseldorf, Germany
- 2006: Kristinehamns Museum for Modern Art, Kristinehamn, Sweden
- 2006: Statoil / Hydro Collection, Oslo, Norway

== Selected bibliography ==
- 2012: himmelgrau., Galerie Bezirk Oberbayern, Munich, Germany, pp. 8–9, 24–29
- 2012: Bo Christian Larsson, Ludlow 38, New York City, US
- 2012: Bo Christian Larsson, Kalmar Konstmuseum, Sweden
- 2012: Bo Christian Larsson, Kristinehamns Konstmuseum, Sweden
- 2011: Falling From Grace – Junge Schwedische Kunst, Rostock Kunsthalle, Germany
- 2011: Colliding Discourses, Shiryaevo Biennal, Samara, Russia
- 2011: Unlängst im Wald, Bayerische Staatsforsten, Regensburg, Germany
- 2011: Cataclysmic raft – out of harms way, Stiftung Kunstraum Sylt Quelle, Hamburg, Germany
- 2011: Bo Christian Larsson, Gallery Bo Bjerggaard, Copenhagen, Denmark
- 2011: “100” by Francesca Gavin, published by Laurence King, London, UK
- 2011: Bo Christian Larsson, Kunstverein Braunschweig, Braunschweig, Germany
- 2010: Vokabelkrieger V Aufbruch, published by Hybriden – Verlag Berlin, Germany
- 2010: Das ist Programm, steinle contemporary, Munich, Germany, pp. 34–39
- 2010: Gegenüber und Miteinander (exhibition booklet), Munich, Germany, pp. 22–23
- 2009: Bo Christian Larsson "For Earthly Things Where Turned Into Watery, And What Before Swam In The Water Now Went Upon The Ground", (exh. cat.)
- 2009: Walking in my mind, Hayward Gallery, Sounthbank Centre, London (exh.cat.)
- 2009: Bo Christian Larsson, On and on is how we are, Monograph, published by Argo Books, Berlin, Germany
- 2008: Favoriten 08 Neue Kunst in München, exh.cat., Lenbachhaus, Munich, Germany, pp. 70–75, p. 107
- 2008: Kom Hem. Tjugo Värmländska Konstnärer Återvänder! Rackstadmusset, Arvika, Sweden, exh.cat.
- 2008: Bo Christian Larsson, What was done in the dark, will be brought to the light, Munich, exh.cat.
- 2007: MONOPOL, 12/2007, December, pp. 94–96
- 2007: Kunstforum, No. 184, March–April 2007, pp. 358–361
- 2007: Artforum, February 2007, pp. 282–285
- 2006/07: Allan Kaprow. 18 Happenings in 6 Parts, p. 66–67
- 2006/07: Art as Life, Haus der Kunst, Munich, 2006/2007, pp. 66–67
