= Bäckhammar =

- Location within Sweden
- Coordinates: 59°10′N 14°11′E
- Country: Sweden
- Province: Värmland
- County: Värmland County
- Municipality: Kristinehamn Municipality

Area
  - Total: 0.91 km^{2} (0.35 sq mi)

Population (31 December 2010)
  - Total: 284
  - Density: 313/km^{2} (810/sq mi)
- Time zone: UTC+1 (CET)
  - Summer (DST): UTC+2 (CEST)

Bäckhammar is a locality situated in Kristinehamn Municipality, Värmland County, Sweden with 284 inhabitants in 2010.
