= IFK Ölme =

Swedish football club

- Full name: Idrottsföreningen Kamraterna Ölme
- Founded: 1942
- Ground: Brovallens IP; Kristinehamn; Sweden
- Chairman: Olle Söderlind
- Head coach: Jan Svensson
- Coach: Magnus Alpmyr
- League: Division 3 Västra Svealand
- 2010: Division 3 Västra Svealand, 7th
Home colours	Away colours

IFK Ölme is a Swedish football club located in Kristinehamn in Värmland County.

== Background ==
Idrottsföreningen Kamraterna Ölme were formed in 1942. The most famous football player to play for IFK Ölme is Magnus "Ölme" Johansson, who played in the Swedish Olympic team in Barcelona in 1992 and the Swedish champions IFK Göteborg.

Since their foundation IFK Ölme has participated mainly in the middle and lower divisions of the Swedish football league system. The club currently plays in Division 3 Västra Svealand which is the fifth tier of Swedish football. They play their home matches at the Brovallens IP in Kristinehamn. IFK Ölme are able to make use of indoor facilities at the Environiq Arena in Kristinehamn.

IFK Ölme are affiliated to Värmlands Fotbollförbund.

== Recent history ==
In recent seasons IFK Ölme have competed in the following divisions:

2011 – Division III, Västra Svealand
2010 – Division III, Västra Svealand
2009 – Division III, Västra Svealand
2008 – Division III, Västra Svealand
2007 – Division III, Västra Svealand
2006 – Division II, Östra Svealand
2005 – Division II, Västra Götaland
2004 – Division II, Västra Svealand
2003 – Division II, Västra Svealand
2002 – Division II, Västra Svealand
2001 – Division II, Västra Svealand
2000 – Division III, Västra Svealand
1999 – Division III, Västra Svealand
1998 – Division III, Västra Svealand
1997 – Division III, Västra Svealand

== Attendances ==
Select IFK Ölme average attendances:

Season	Average attendance	Division / Section	Level
2001	551	Div 2 Västra Svealand	Tier 3
2002	450	Div 2 Västra Svealand	Tier 3
2003	277	Div 2 Västra Svealand	Tier 3
2004	632	Div 2 Västra Svealand	Tier 3
2005	368	Div 2 Västra Svealand	Tier 3
2006	155	Div 2 Östra Svealand	Tier 4
2007	131	Div 3 Västra Svealand	Tier 5
2008	99	Div 3 Västra Svealand	Tier 5
2009	77	Div 3 Västra Svealand	Tier 5
2010	100	Div 3 Västra Svealand	Tier 5

* Attendances are provided in the Publikliga sections of the Svenska Fotbollförbundet website and European Football Statistics website.
