= Björneborg, Sweden =

Björneborg
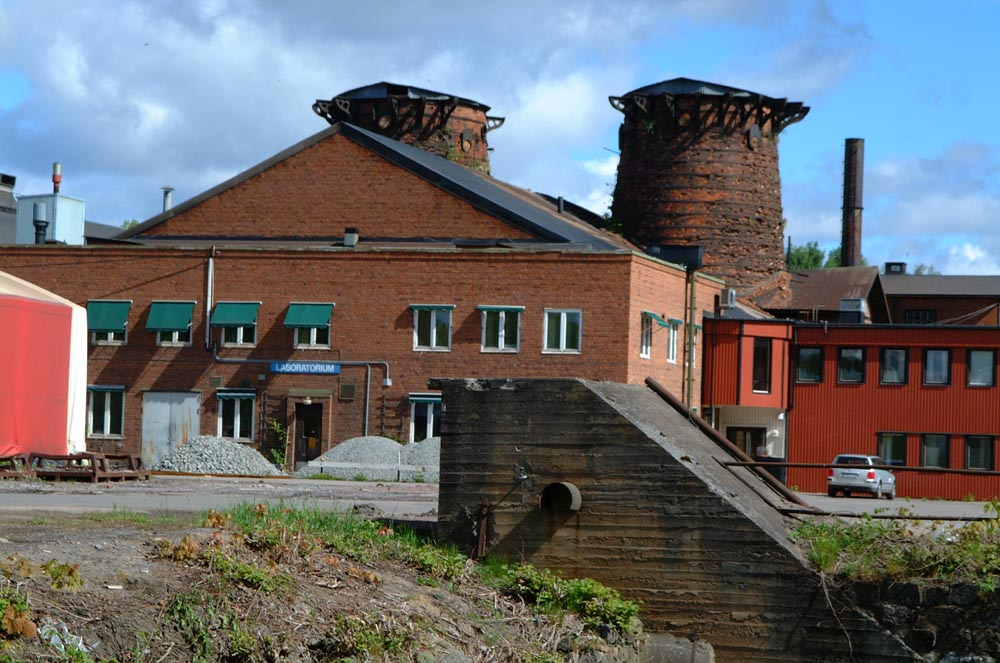

- Location within Sweden
- Coordinates: 59°15′N 14°15′E
- Country: Sweden
- Province: Värmland
- County: Värmland County
- Municipality: Kristinehamn Municipality

Area
  - Total: 1.57 km^{2} (0.61 sq mi)

Population (31 December 2010)
  - Total: 1,099
  - Density: 700/km^{2} (1,800/sq mi)
- Time zone: UTC+1 (CET)
  - Summer (DST): UTC+2 (CEST)

Björneborg is a locality situated in Kristinehamn Municipality, Värmland County, Sweden with 1,099 inhabitants in 2010.
