= Kristinehamn =

Place in Värmland, Sweden

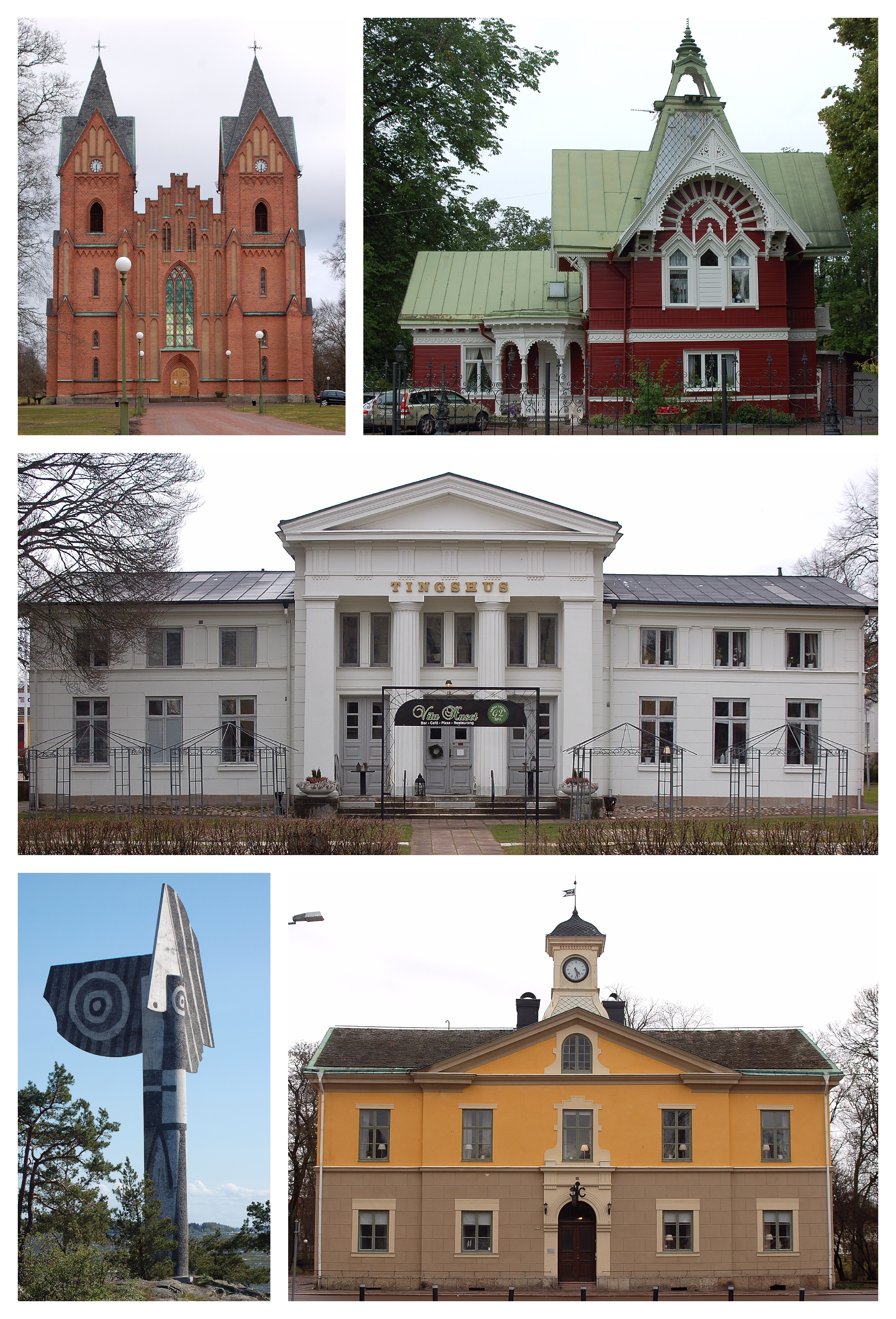

- Location within Sweden
- Coordinates: 59°18′N 14°07′E
- Country: Sweden
- Province: Värmland
- County: Värmland County
- Municipality: Kristinehamn Municipality

Area
  - Total: 13.36 km^{2} (5.16 sq mi)

Population (31 December 2010)
  - Total: 17,839
  - Density: 1,335/km^{2} (3,460/sq mi)
- Time zone: UTC+1 (CET)
  - Summer (DST): UTC+2 (CEST)

Kristinehamn is a locality and the seat of Kristinehamn Municipality, Värmland County, Sweden, with 24,053 inhabitants in 2022.

== Geography ==
Kristinehamn is situated by the shores of lake Vänern where the small rivers Varnan and Löt drain into the lake. It has a harbour and is a railroad and road transportation center. Nearby towns include Karlskoga and Karlstad and are located exactly in the middle of Oslo, Stockholm and Gothenburg with 250 km to each of them.

== History ==
The location has had a resident population for centuries, at least since the Stone Age. The town was then built alongside the bridge over river Varnan. Its name was Broo (or Bro) until 1642, and "Bro" literally means "Bridge" in Swedish.

Kristinehamn got a royal charter for the first time in 1582 but lost it in 1584, and regained it in 1642, and changed its name in honour of the monarch Queen Christina of Sweden. It thus qualifies as one of Sweden's historical cities. Its city arms were designated with a bojort, which is a Dutch ship in use in the 17th century.

== Sites of interest ==
- By the shores of lake Vänern stands this 15 meter high Pablo Picasso statue at 59.273279°N 14.051522°E since 1965. The statue was designed by Picasso, but built and inaugurated without him visiting the construction site. Picasso never visited Kristinehamn. Its 15 meters make it the second tallest Picasso Sculpture in the world, after the Chicago sculpture that is 15.2 meters tall.
- The oldest runestone in the county of Värmland, the Järsberg Runestone with origin back to 500 AC, is located about 1 km outside the town of Järsberg. The latest interpretation of the runes was made by Sven B. F. Jansson (1906-1987). Quotation: "My name is "Ljuv". My name is "Ravn". Me "Eril" am making the runes". A pearl from the same period of time has been found in the area.
- Kristinehamn Church (Kristinehamns kyrka) was designed by professor Carl Georg Brunius (1793–1869) and was first opened in 1858. The church also has a museum in the sanctuary gallery that is worth a visit because of its unique architecture.

== Sports ==
The following sports clubs are located in Kristinehamn:

- IFK Ölme
- IFK Kristinehamn

== Notable people ==
- Bror Beckman (1866–1929), composer and principal of the Royal College of Music, Stockholm. & Treasurer of the Swedish Academy of Music
- Bo Christian Larsson (1976-), an artist who works mostly with large-sized drawings, installations, performance art & objects
- Torsten Palm (1947-), former Formula One driver.
- Tom Trana (1937–1991), Motor rally driver
- Ivan Trana, Motor engineer, Father of Tom Trana
- Gustaf Lindblom, Athlete, Head of Editorial Office of the Sport Magazine Idrottsbladet, & Secretary of the Swedish Boxing Federation
- John Mikaelsson, Athlete
- Olof Skoldberg, Sport shooter

== Gallery ==
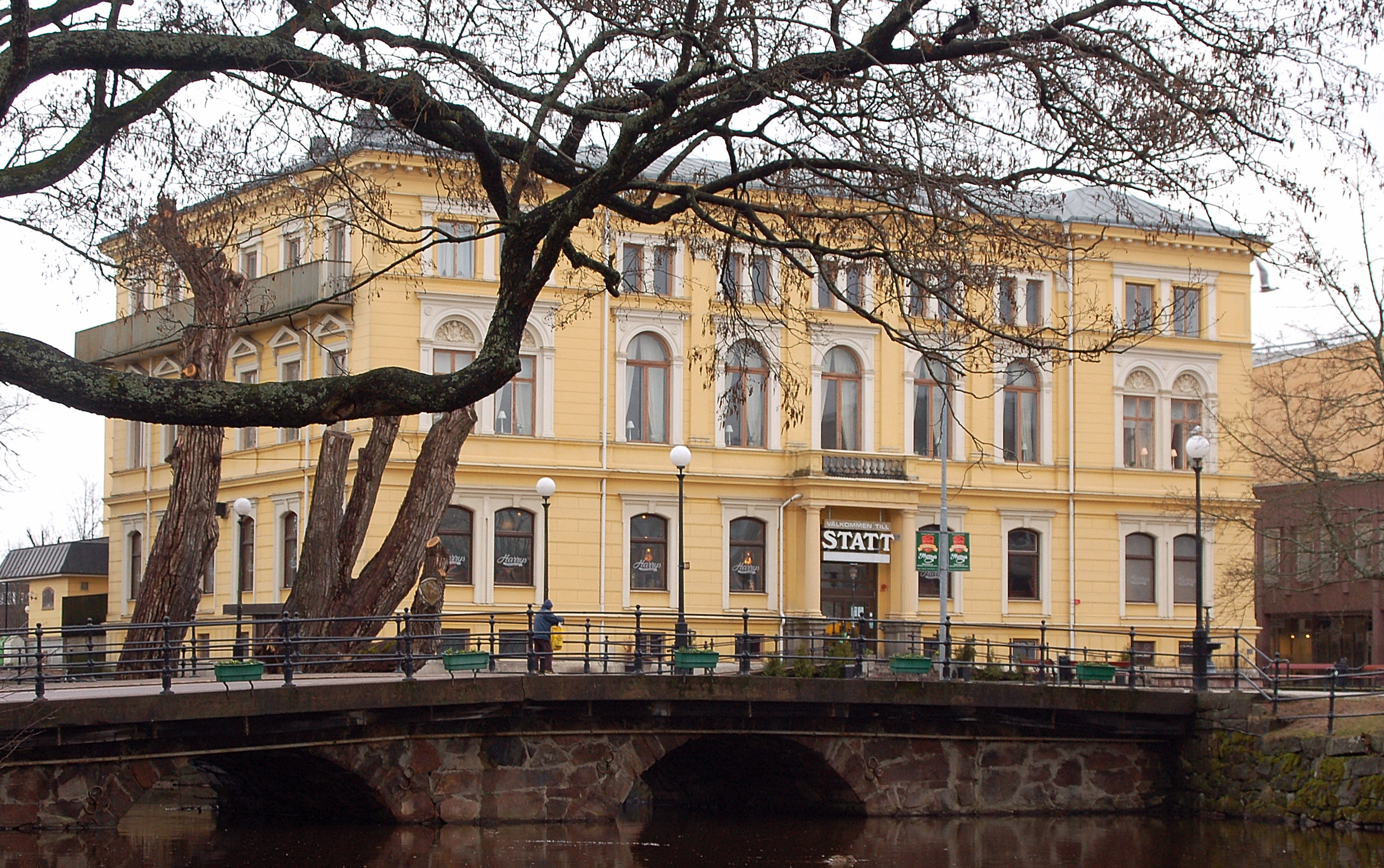
Kristinehamn City Hotel

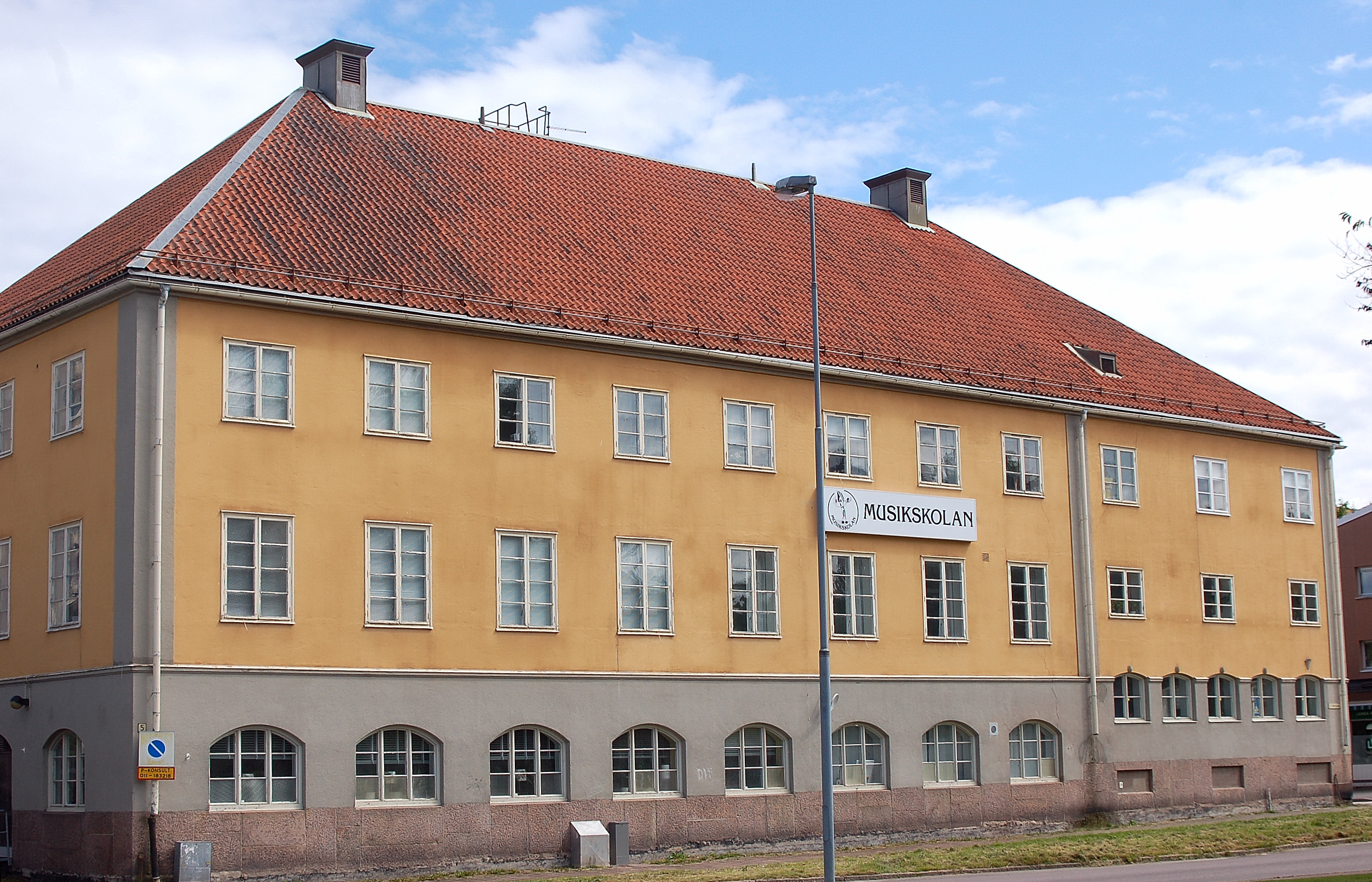
Kristinehamn Music School

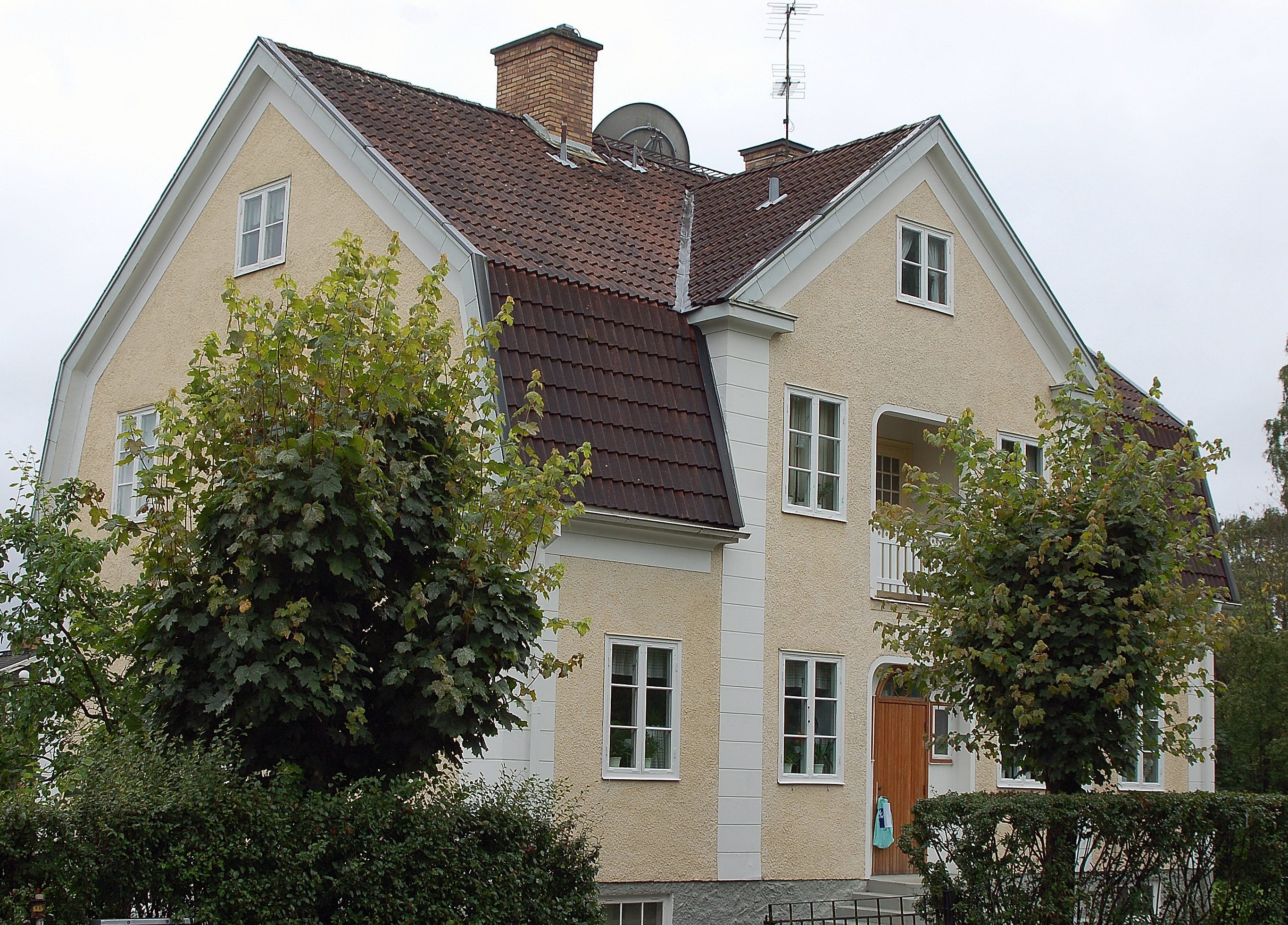
Villa Älvdalen
