= Greåker =

Borough of Sarpsborg, Norway

Coordinates: 59°16′N 11°02′E

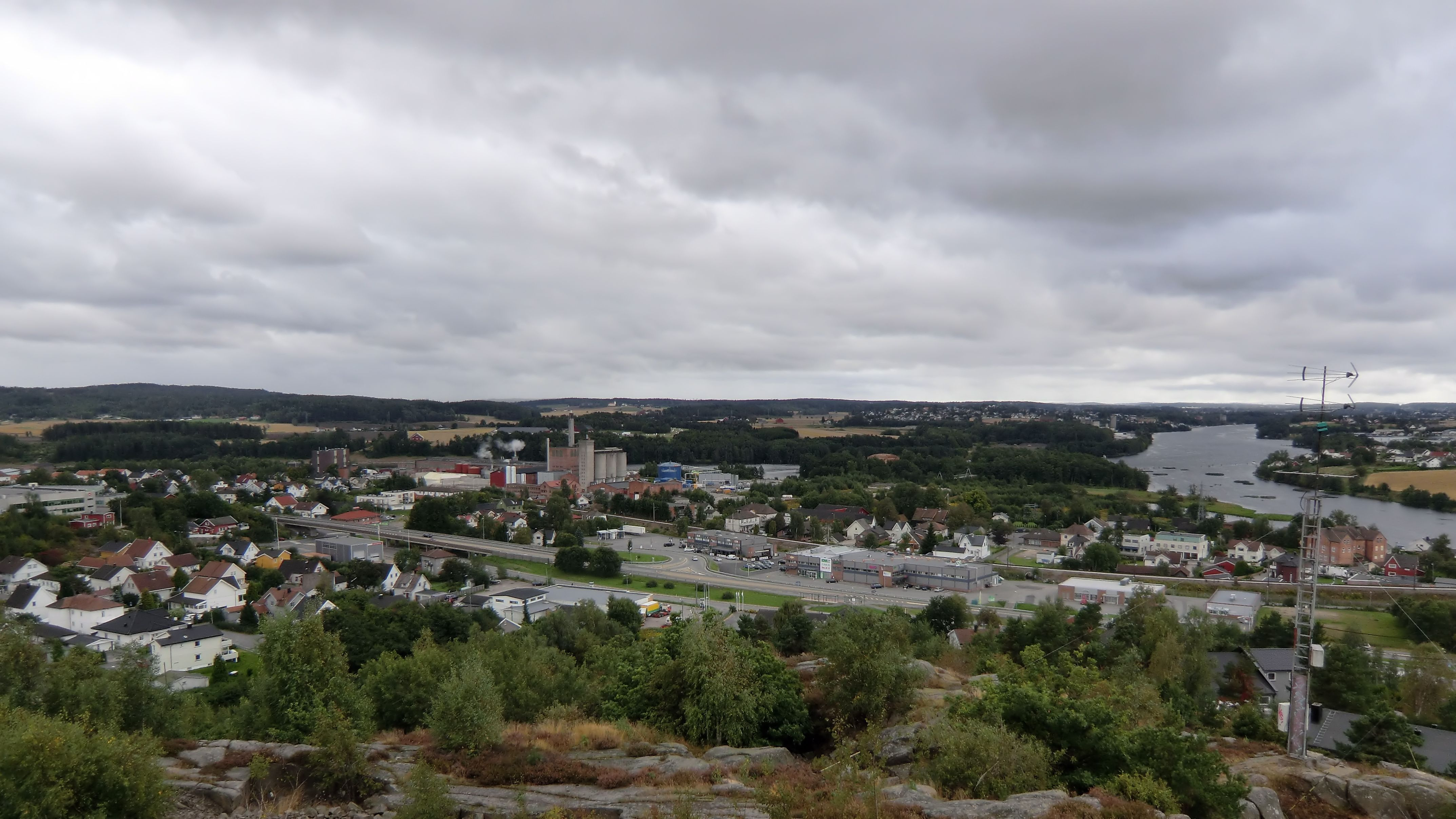
Centre of Greåker

Greåker is a borough in the city of Sarpsborg, Norway, located 7 km west of the city centre. Before 1992 Greåker was a part of Tune municipality. It is on the river Glomma between Sarpsborg and Fredrikstad.
