= University of Oslo Faculty of Law =

Coordinates: 59.9158°N 10.7356°E

- Established: 1811; 215 years ago
- School type: Public
- Dean: Ragnhild Hennum
- Location: Oslo, Norway
- Enrollment: Approximately 4,300
- Faculty: 270 full-time
- Website: www.jus.uio.no

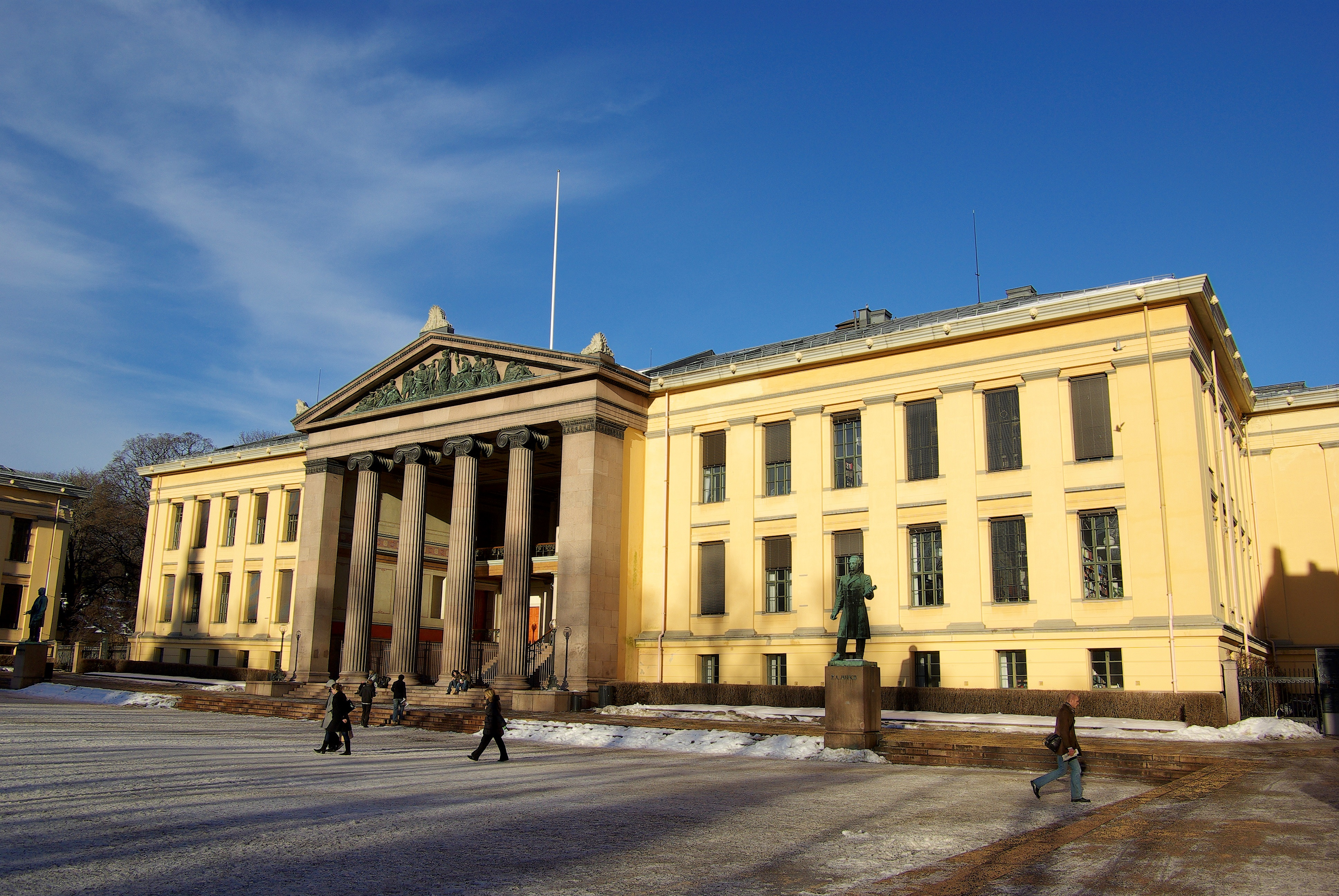
Domus Media, one of the faculty's buildings. The Nobel Peace Prize was awarded annually in this building 1947–1989 and in 2020

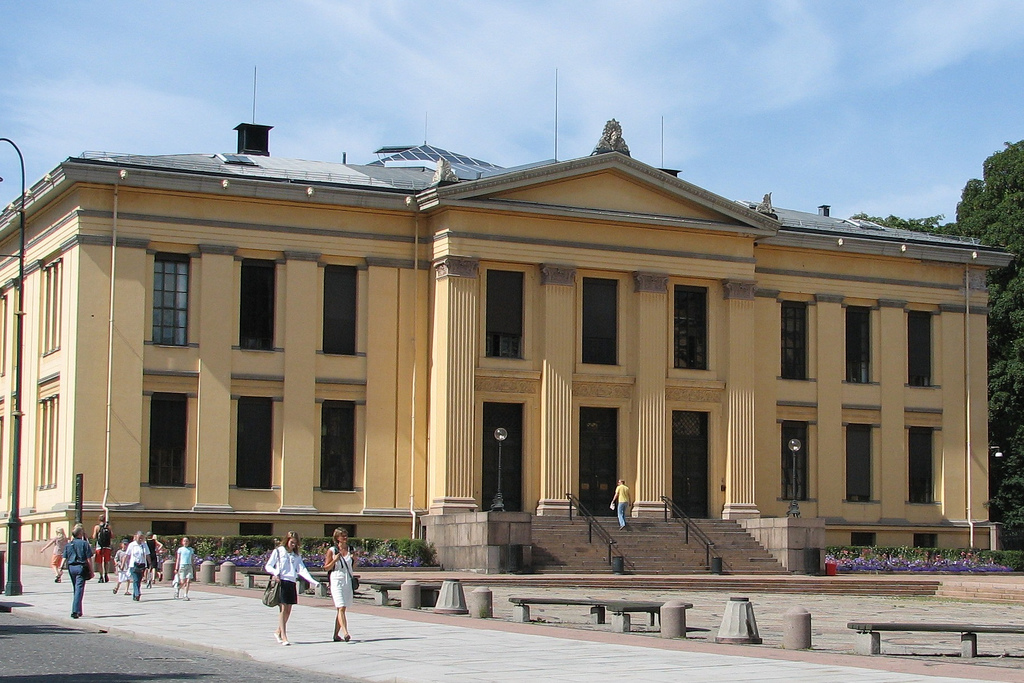
Domus Bibliotheca

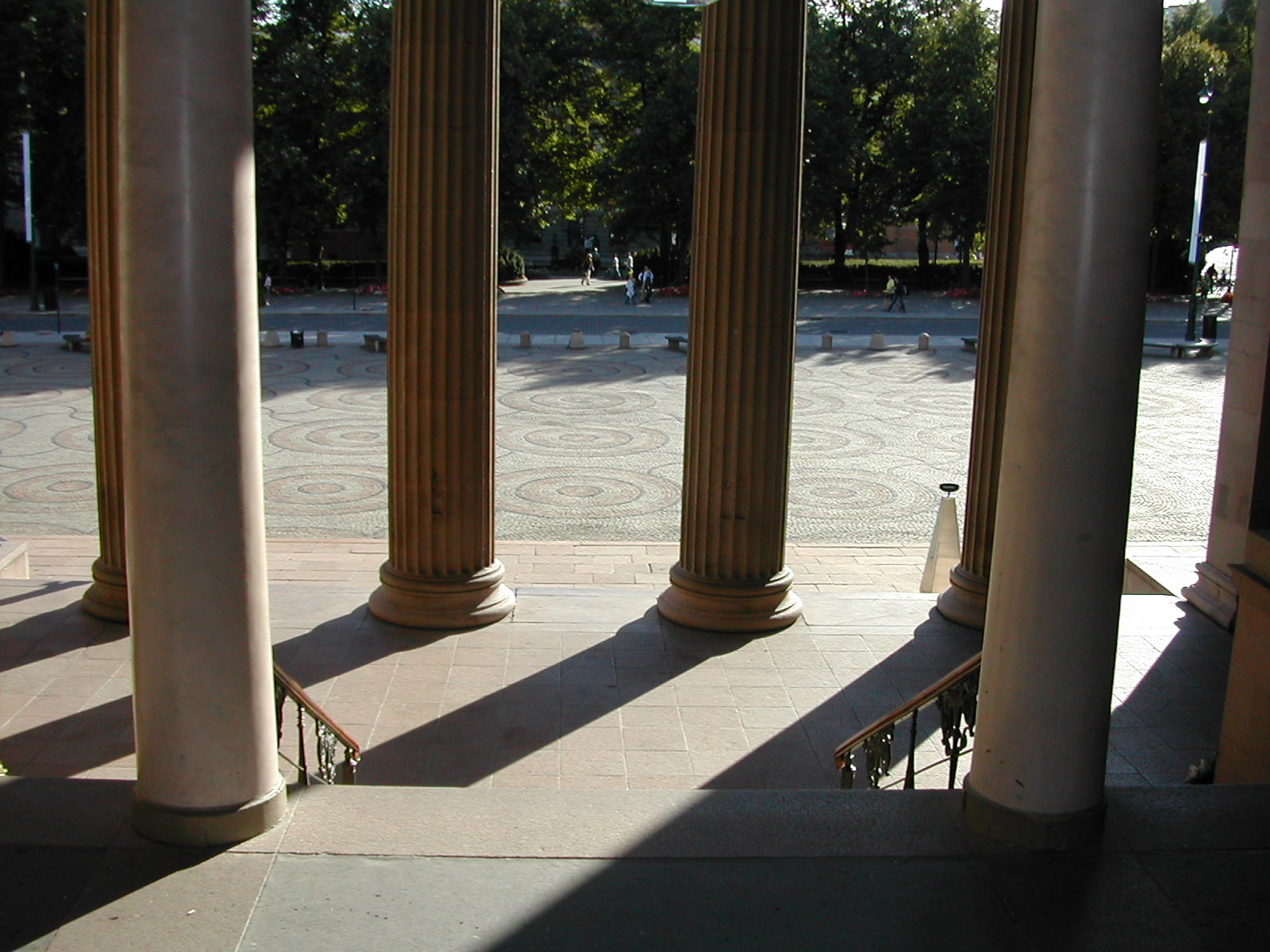
The University Square seen from Domus Media

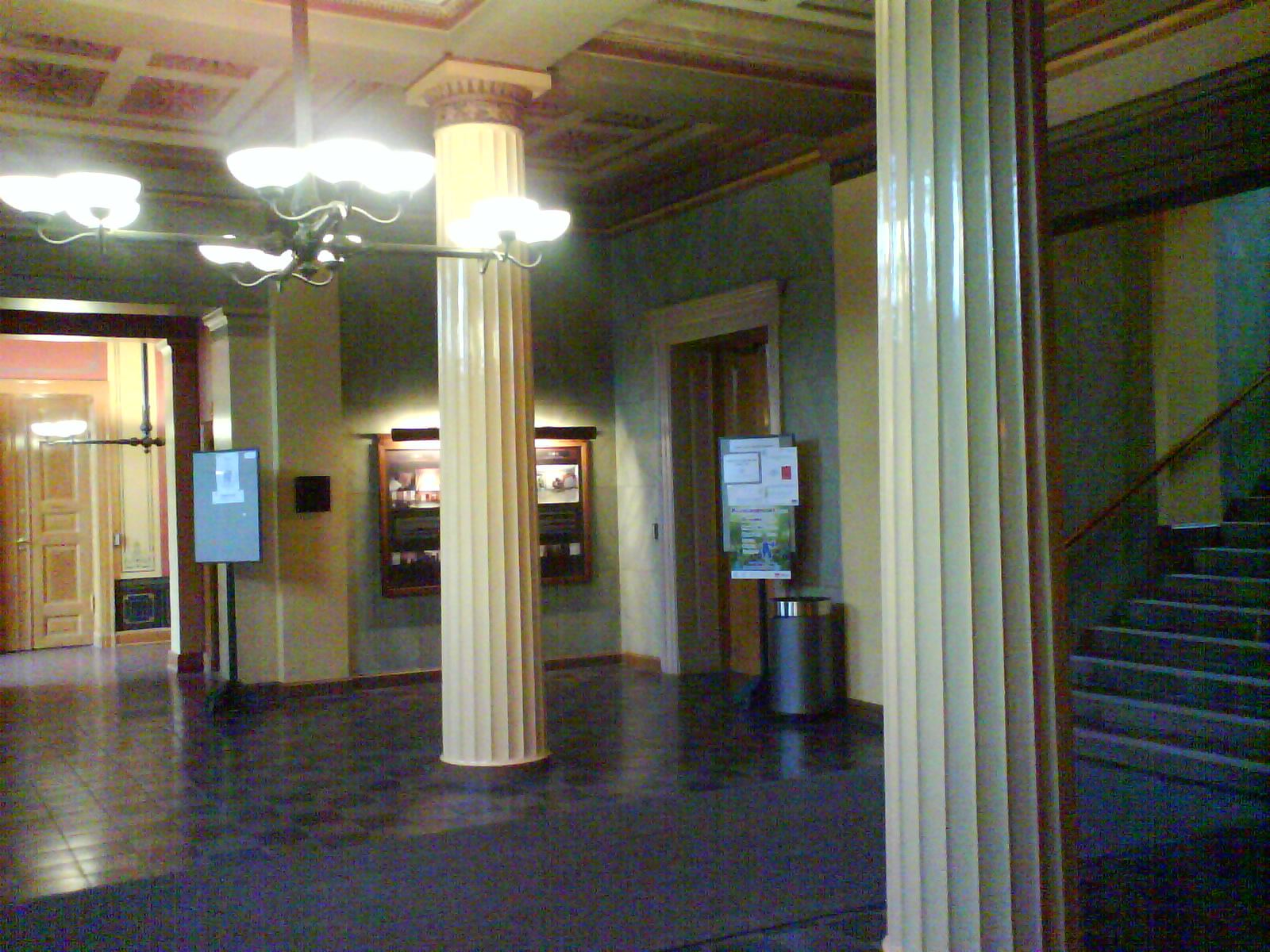
The foyer of Domus Academica. The Parliament of Norway convened in this building 1854–1866

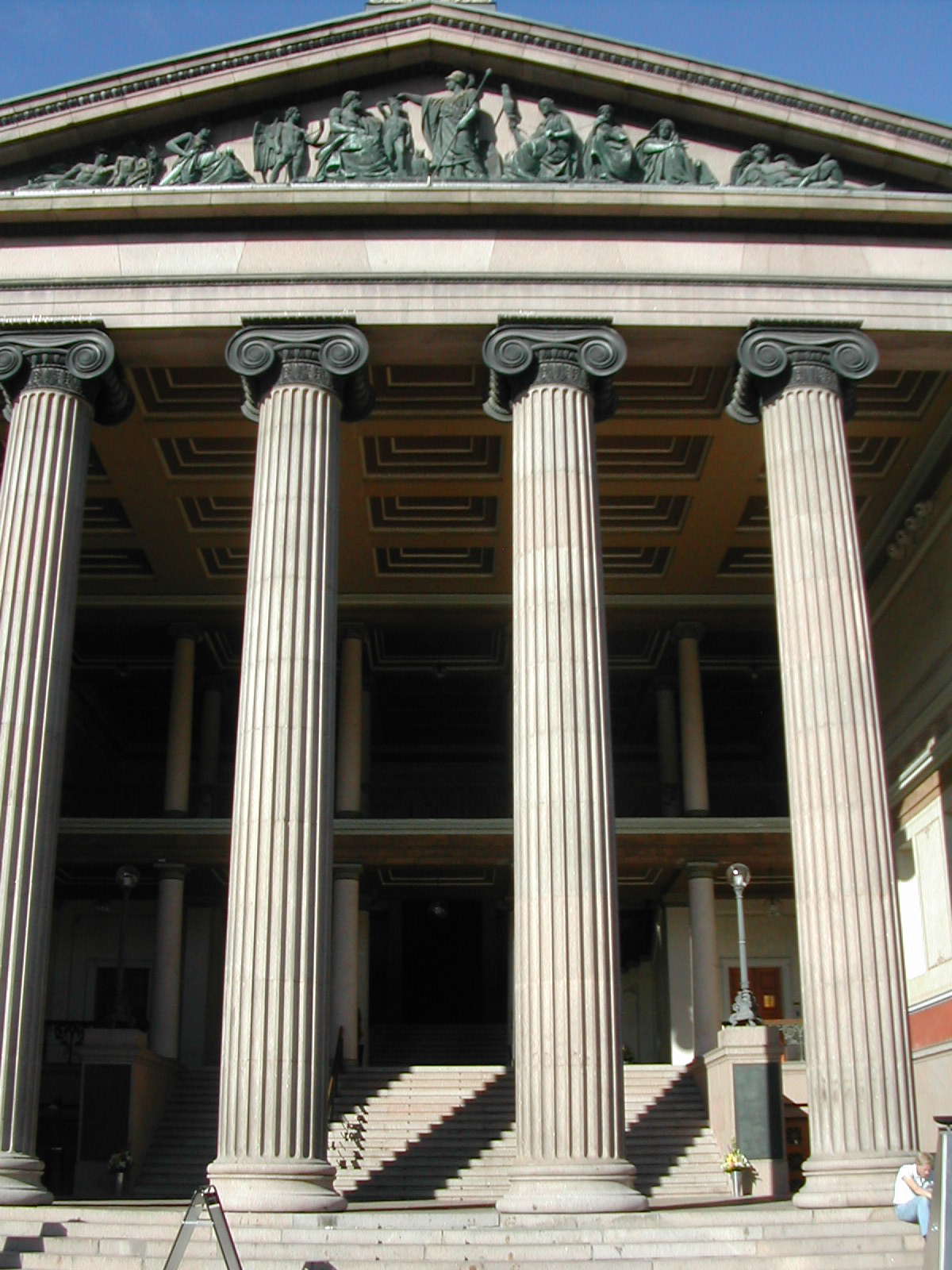
Domus Media. The stair hall is closely inspired by Altes Museum

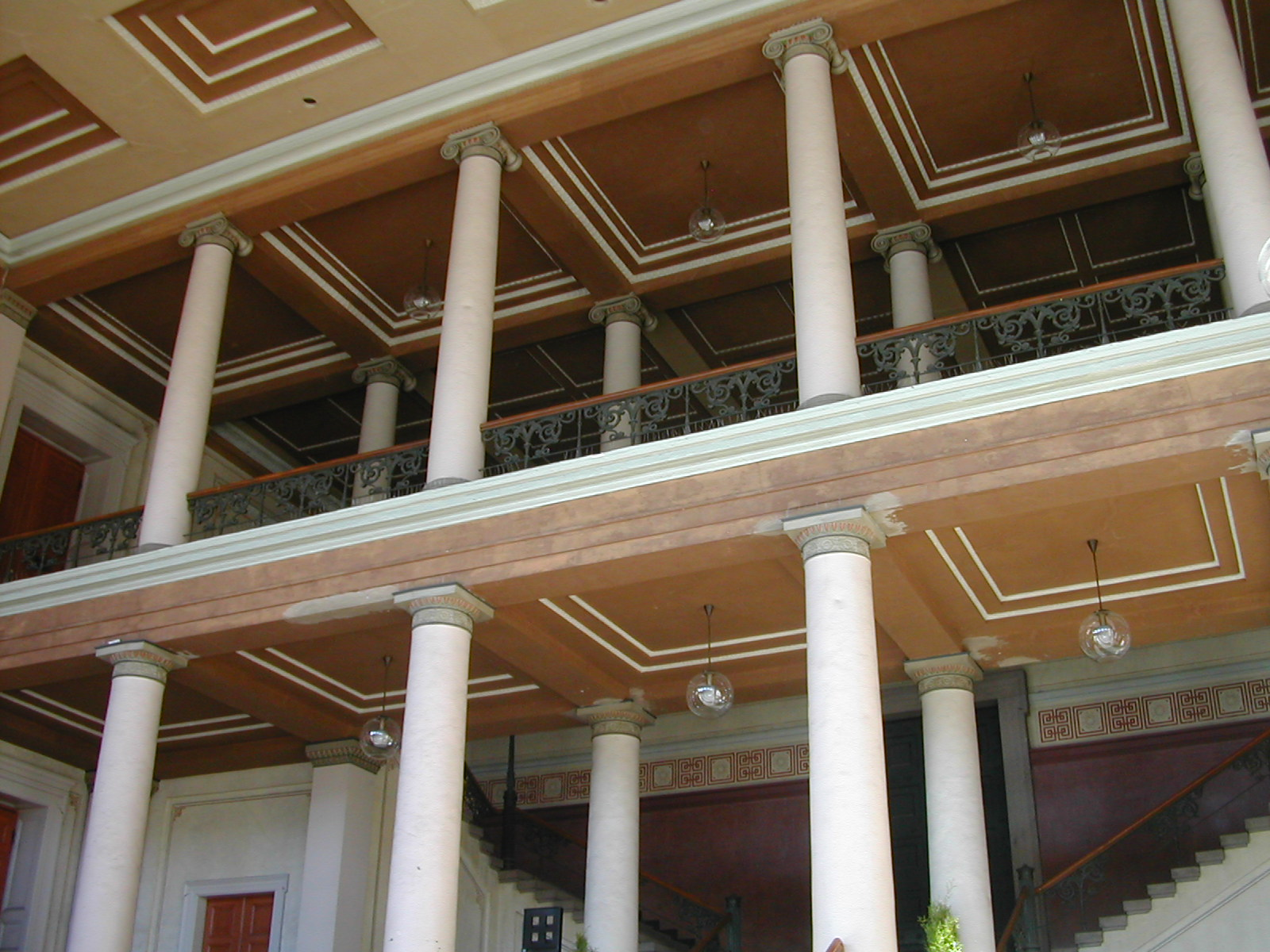
The stair hall of Domus Media, in more detail

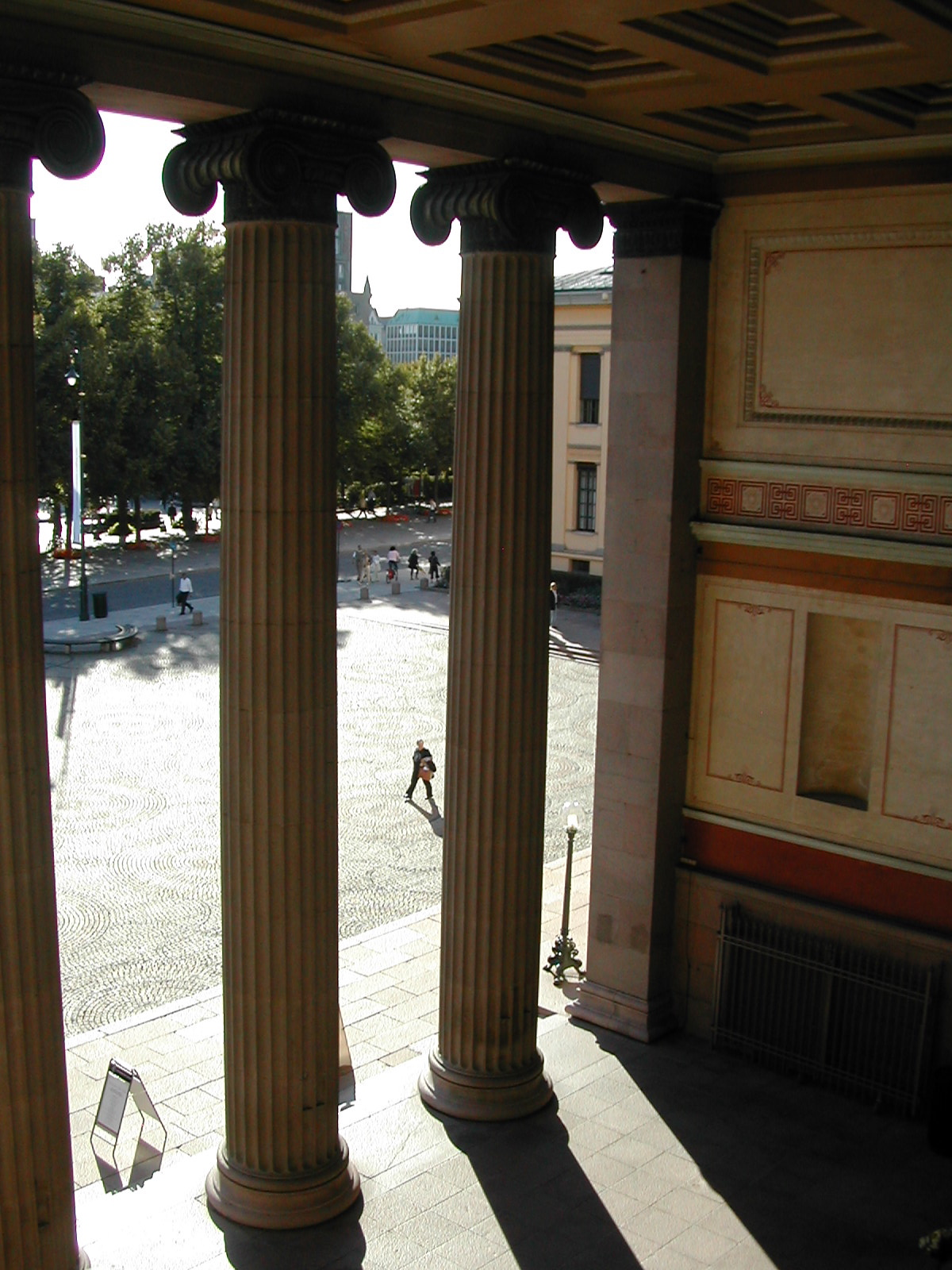
The University Square seen from Domus Media

The Faculty of Law (Norwegian: Det juridiske fakultet) of the University of Oslo is Norway's oldest law faculty, established in 1811 as one of the four original faculties of The Royal Frederick University (renamed the University of Oslo in 1939). Alongside the law faculties in Copenhagen, Lund and Uppsala, it is one of Scandinavia's leading institutions of legal education and research. The faculty is the highest-ranked institution of legal education in Norway and is responsible for the professional law degree, one of the most competitive programmes at any Norwegian university. Those admitted to the law programme at the University of Oslo tend to have an average high school grade that is higher than the highest grade, and are usually the best in their class at high school level.

Prior to 1811, the University of Copenhagen was the only university of Denmark-Norway, and the curriculum of the new law faculty in Christiania (renamed Oslo in 1925) was based on that of the University of Copenhagen Faculty of Law and long retained strong similarities, even after the dissolution of the Dano-Norwegian union in 1814. As the only faculty of law in Norway until 1980, it traditionally educated all lawyers of Norway and remains the country's most important law faculty, educating around 75% of all new legal candidates in Norway. Its law programme is one of the most competitive programmes to get into at any Norwegian university, with an acceptance rate of 12%. The faculty offers education and conducts research in both law and in related areas such as criminology and sociology of law, and historically also in economics (its former Dean, Ragnar Frisch, was awarded the first Nobel Memorial Prize in Economic Sciences).

The faculty occupies the old university campus in the centre of Oslo, near the National Theatre, the Royal Palace, and the Parliament, constructed 1841–1851 by Christian Heinrich Grosch with the assistance of world-famous Prussian architect Karl Friedrich Schinkel in Schinkel's neoclassical style, with strong similarities to Schinkel's famous museums on the Museum Island in Berlin. The old campus includes three main buildings, called Domus Academica, Domus Media and Domus Bibliotheca, centered on the University Square and facing Karl Johans gate. It is complemented by the new building Domus Juridica in the opposite direction, located between the Old National Gallery and the Museum of Cultural History, facing the old campus.

The Nobel Peace Prize was awarded in the atrium of the central building of the old campus, Domus Media, 1947–1989 and in 2020. The Parliament of Norway convened in the Old Ceremonial Hall in Domus Academica 1854–1866. The faculty publishes several academic journals, including the English-language journal Oslo Law Review.

== History ==
The University of Copenhagen was founded in 1479. As there was no university in Norway itself, the University of Copenhagen served both Denmark and Norway during the countries' personal union, and the University of Copenhagen had both Norwegian students and teachers. With the rise of absolute monarchy and a more professional civil service, legal education became of central importance by the early 18th century. During the Napoleonic Wars, and after years of discussion, The Royal Frederick University in Norway was established in 1811 and named in honour of Frederick VI of Denmark and Norway, and the Faculty of Law was one of the four original faculties, ranking second after the Faculty of Theology and before the Faculty of Medicine and the Faculty of Arts. In 1816, its first lecturers were appointed by the government: Lorents Lange (born 1781) was appointed Professor of Jurisprudence, and Henrik Lauritz Nicolai Steenbuch (born 1774) was appointed Lecturer in Jurisprudence.

As a sovereign kingdom, Norway always had its own laws, but in 1687, Norway received its Norwegian Code, which was nearly identical to the Danish Code, and parts of which remain in effect until this day. Norway and Denmark hence shared a common legal tradition and in fact many of the same laws. The curriculum of the Faculty of Law in Christiania was hence to a large degree a direct continuation of the curriculum and traditions of the University of Copenhagen. Similarities exist until this day, although they have gradually been weakened.

The field of economics as an academic discipline in Norway evolved at the Faculty of Law. In 1840, a chair in "Jurisprudence, Economics, and Statistics" was created by the King; it was first held by Anton Martin Schweigaard.

== Programmes and degrees ==
=== Principal law programme ===
The most important programme of the Faculty of Law is the 5-year legal education leading to a Master of Laws (LL.M.) degree, known in Norwegian as master i rettsvitenskap (literally, "master of jurisprudence"), which is a protected title under Norwegian law. The programme replaced (2004–2007) the former six-year programme leading to a Candidate of Law (cand.jur.) degree, which was created in 1736 at the University of Copenhagen and retained at the Royal Frederick University from 1811 (the degree is still awarded in Copenhagen).

The Master or Laws or the former Candidate of Law are the only degrees qualifying for legal work in Norway. The graduates have a monopoly on a number of occupations, such as advocate (barrister), judge and, traditionally, all the high ranks of the Norwegian Police Service and a number of senior civil servant positions. Norway has a united legal profession and all persons working in legal occupations have the same education. Alongside the programme in medicine, the programme in law in Oslo is one of the most competitive to get into at any Norwegian university with an acceptance rate of 12%.

Although students do not receive a formal degree before they have completed the five-year programme, the first four years correspond to an American J.D. degree. In the fifth year, students usually write a thesis corresponding to one semester and take advanced courses of their choice also corresponding to one semester. Alternatively, they may choose to write a longer thesis, corresponding to a full year. Parts of the fifth year, or even the full year, may also be taken abroad. The fifth year leads to the Master of Laws degree.

=== Other degrees ===
From 1840 to 1966, the field of economics was part of the Faculty of Law, and most of the professors of economics until the mid 20th century had a background in law. Prior to 1966, the Faculty of Law conferred the degree cand.oecon., created in 1905, which was originally a 2-year supplementary degree in economics intended for those already holding a cand.jur. degree, and which in 1934 evolved into an independent five-year degree in economics.

The Faculty of Law also offers degrees at all levels in criminology and a master's degree in sociology of law.

In recent years, a number of specialized master's degree programmes in law, so-called LL.M. degrees, have been established. The Faculty of Law offers 1,5-year master's degrees in international public law, international criminal and humanitarian law, international economic law, international environmental and energy law and human rights. These degrees are intended for those already holding a law degree, whether foreign or Norwegian. They do not qualify for legal work in Norway, however, and very few Norwegian students obtain such degrees, as the basic legal education in Norway already leads to a degree at the LL.M. level. These programmes are hence mostly attracting foreign students.

=== Doctoral, licentiate and PhD degrees ===
The former doctorate in law, doctor juris (dr. jur.), created with the establishment of the University of Copenhagen in 1479 and retained by The Royal Frederick University from 1811, was gradually replaced (2004–2008) by the new degree philosophiae doctor (ph.d.), created in 2003. The faculty also confers the doctoral degree doctor philosophiae (dr.philos.), created in 1824, traditionally to doctoral candidates who are not legal professionals (for example to those with degrees in humanities or social sciences) or to scholars with a background in law who write a dissertation in a different field than law, and today to doctoral candidates who are not enrolled in the structured doctoral programme, but hand in their dissertation following independent research only (as was the case also for the dr.jur. degree until the 1990s). Traditionally, a doctoral degree was not a prerequisite for employment as a researcher, and was usually obtained after many years of research (ten or more), often by researchers at the associate professor level. The Faculty of Law confers doctorates in law and in other relevant disciplines such as criminology, sociology of law, philosophy of law, and formerly in economics.

Prior to 1845, the licentiate degree also existed at The Royal Frederick University, as a degree below the doctorate but above the professional degrees. The licentiate degree was reintroduced in 1955 at the Faculty of Law (lic.jur.) and was awarded until 2003. It corresponds to a PhD degree.

Prior to the Bologna Process, the degree system at the University of Oslo Faculty of Law mirrored that of the University of Copenhagen, and Denmark in general. In Denmark, both the dr.jur. degree and the ph.d. degree exist today. The ph.d. degree, conferred following a 3-year programme by those already holding a (5-year) cand.jur. degree, is considered equivalent to and a direct continuation of the licentiate degree, whereas the dr.jur. degree is considered a doctorate in the proper sense, also referred to as a higher doctorate. Often the dr.jur. degree is obtained by those already holding a cand.jur. and a ph.d. degree.

== Grade system ==
The law faculties in Norway have long used grades differently than other faculties in Norway. This is still the case. At the University of Oslo, where all those who are accepted to the law programme have an average grade from high school equal to or even higher than the highest grade and are usually the best in their class at high school level, most law students receive the grades C or D. Accordingly, C is considered a better than average grade at the University of Oslo's law faculty, while D is considered a normal grade. Very few law students receive the grades A or B. This stands in contrast to other institutions or fields of study, where A and B may be more common grades. The law faculties share the exceptionally high admission requirements with the medical faculties. In medicine there is a strong tradition in Norway of considering all doctors as part of an educational elite and placing little emphasis on university-level grades due to the very high admission requirements, and this culture of emphasizing that all law graduates from the University of Oslo are part of an educational elite has also become more prevalent in the legal field as admission requirements to the law programme became extremely high.

== Research ==
The faculty's two departments of Sociology of Law and Criminology, which are now merged to form a single department, are famous internationally for their contributions to the fields of sociology of law and criminology since the 1950s. Eminent academics in this field include Nils Christie, Vilhelm Aubert, and Thomas Mathiesen.

Ragnar Frisch, who was professor of economics and statistics at the Faculty of Law from 1931 and also served as its dean, founded the discipline of econometrics and coined the terms macroeconomics/microeconomics, and was awarded the first Nobel Memorial Prize in Economic Sciences in 1969.

The faculty is also recognized internationally for its research on maritime law, petroleum and energy law, human rights, feminist jurisprudence, and the emerging field of information/communication technology law. The Norwegian Research Center for Computers and Law is the second-oldest institution in the world in this field. Feminist jurisprudence became a recognised discipline at the faculty in 1975, and the faculty established a department of feminist jurisprudence, headed by Tove Stang Dahl, in 1978.

A number of academic journals are published by or edited at the Faculty of Law, including the Nordic Journal of Human Rights and Tidsskrift for Rettsvitenskap (Scandinavia's leading law journal, established in 1888).

== Buildings ==
The faculty's main, neoclassicist buildings, centered on the University Square and facing Karl Johans gate, constructed by Christian Heinrich Grosch and Karl Friedrich Schinkel 1841–1851, are

- Domus Bibliotheca (to the left, seen from Karl Johans gate), which includes the Law Library, IT rooms, lecture halls and offices for professors
- Domus Media (in the centre), which includes reading rooms, lecture halls, offices for professors, and in the centre, the Atrium
- Domus Academica (to the right, seen from Karl Johans gate), which includes the Old Ceremonial Hall, lecture halls, offices for the administration, and IT rooms

These buildings are strongly influenced by Schinkel's monumental buildings in Berlin, in particular the Museumsinsel. The impressive stair hall of Domus Media is closely inspired by the stair hall of Altes Museum in Berlin (completed in 1830).

The Atrium of Domus Media was built as an extension of Domus Media on the occasion of the 100th anniversary of the founding of the university in 1911. It was decorated by Edvard Munch 1909–16. In front of Domus Media, statues of Peter Andreas Munch and Anton Martin Schweigaard are displayed.

The Nobel Peace Prize was awarded in the Atrium of Domus Media 1947–1989. Among those who received the prize in Domus Media are Martin Luther King Jr. (1964), Mother Teresa (1979), Desmond Tutu (1984), and the 14th Dalai Lama (1989). Before 1947, the prize was awarded in the Norwegian Nobel Institute, and since 1990, it has been awarded in Oslo City Hall two minutes walk from the Faculty of Law. Since 2003, the Abel Prize has been awarded in the Atrium. The Atrium is also used for concerts and cultural events, and for the Faculty of Law's own events.

The Parliament of Norway convened in the Old Ceremonial Hall of Domus Academica from 1854 to 1866, when the Parliament of Norway Building was completed.

In addition to the three main buildings of the old campus, the faculty uses several other newer buildings in the immediate vicinity of the old campus in central Oslo.

The Faculty of Law has occupied the old campus continuously since 1851. Until the mid-1980s, the Faculty of Law shared the old campus with the Faculty of Medicine, which was also partially based at the university hospitals in the Oslo area. The Faculty of Medicine has since completely relocated to the university hospitals (mainly Rikshospitalet), leaving the Faculty of Law as the only faculty occupying the old campus. The Atrium in Domus Media and the Old Ceremonial Hall in Domus Academica are still used for ceremonial purposes by other parts of the university. The faculties of theology, humanities and mathematics-natural sciences relocated to Blindern in the suburban West End in the 1930s, where the newer faculties of social sciences and education are also found.

== Departments ==
For the first one and a half century of its existence, the Faculty of Law was not organised into departments, but rather centered on each chair. From the 1950s, a number of departments have been established. All academics are now affiliated with one of the departments. The establishment of the departments was supported by generous grants from shipping magnate (and lawyer) Anders Jahre. For the first decades, the departments had a fairly weak position organisationally. The boundaries between departments in the three traditional higher faculties, i.e. the faculties of theology, law and medicine, are significantly weaker than in the other faculties, and the faculty identity stronger, due to the fact that most employees share the same profession. Historically, all Professors of Law at the Faculty of Law were expected to teach all areas of law.

Law students (i.e. students enrolled in the Master of Laws programme) are not affiliated with any specific department, only with the faculty. Students of criminology, sociology of law or some specialized fields are affiliated with a department, however.

=== Department of Criminology and Sociology of Law ===
The Department of Criminology and Sociology of Law is the largest academic institution in the fields of criminology and sociology of law in the Nordic countries. The department was established in 2000 by the merger of the Department of Criminology (established in 1954 as the Department of Criminology and Criminal Law) and the Department of Sociology of Law (established in 1961). Criminology and criminal law split in the early 1990s, when criminal law became part of the Department of Public and International Law.

=== Department of Public and International Law ===
The Department of Public and International Law was established in 1957. It covers a number of fields in public and international law, including constitutional law, administrative law, public international law, criminal law and criminal procedure, civil procedure, environmental law, labour law, legal history, legal theory, refugee and asylum law, social law, tax law and women's law.

=== Department of Private Law ===
The Department of Private Law was established in 1955.

=== Scandinavian Institute of Maritime Law ===
The Scandinavian Institute of Maritime Law was established in 1955, as the Department of Maritime Law. It includes the Department of Maritime Law and the Department of Petroleum and Energy Law.

=== Norwegian Centre for Human Rights ===
The Norwegian Centre for Human Rights has the status of national human rights institution in Norway, and is internationally recognised as a leading research institution in the field of human rights. The centre is cross-disciplinary, and its staff includes lawyers, social scientists, and philosophers. The centre was established in 1987, and was originally an independent research institution that arose from a cooperation between the University of Oslo and the Peace Research Institute Oslo. It was completely integrated into the University of Oslo Faculty of Law in 2003.

=== Centre of European Law ===
The Centre of European Law is a research centre focusing on European Union law and EEA law. It was established in 1989.

=== Norwegian Research Center for Computers and Law ===
The Norwegian Research Center for Computers and Law is the second oldest institution in this field in the world. It includes the Section for eGovernment Studies.

=== Former departments ===
The faculty formerly had a Department of Economics, which became part of the new Faculty of Social Sciences in 1966.

=== Cooperation ===
The Faculty of Law cooperates with other entities of the University of Oslo which are not formally part of the Faculty of Law, for example the Norwegian Centre for Violence and Traumatic Stress Studies.

== Deans ==
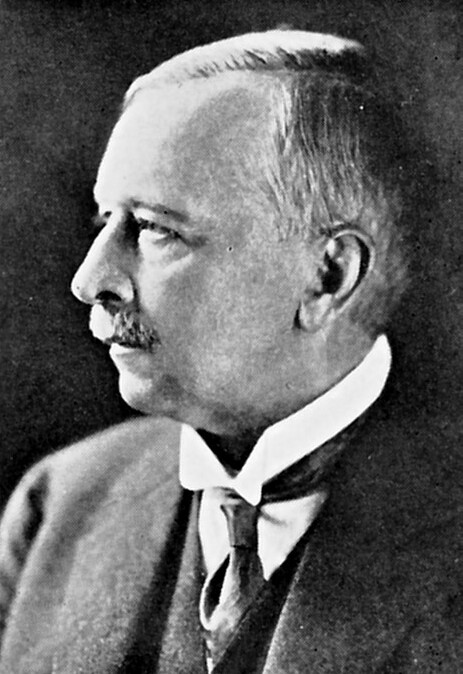
Fredrik Stang, Dean 1921–1927. He simultaneously held the position of Rector of The Royal Frederick University and Chairman of the Norwegian Nobel Committee

Historically, the rector of the university, elected among all the professors, was ex officio also dean of his own faculty. Otherwise the dean was elected among the professors at the faculty.

Readers became eligible to vote in 1939 and other academics and students in 1955. From 1975, even the administrative staff were granted the right to vote.

- Torkel Halvorsen Aschehoug ca. 1879
- Frederik Peter Brandt
- Marcus Pløen Ingstad
- Oskar Jæger 1909–1911
- Absalon Taranger
- Bredo Henrik von Munthe af Morgenstierne 1912–1918 (ex officio)
- Fredrik Stang 1921–1927 (ex officio)
- Ingvar Wedervang 1933–1935
- Frede Castberg ca. 1940
- Theodor Grundt 1940
- Ragnar Frisch 1942–1943
- Carl Jacob Arnholm 1945–1951
- Johannes Andenæs 1959–1960
- Johan Einarsen –1963
- Sjur Brækhus 1963–1967
- Johannes Andenæs 1968–1969
- Anders Bratholm 1974–1976
- Carsten Smith 1977–1979
- Peter Lødrup 1980–1985
- Erling Selvig 1989–1994
- Frederik Zimmer 1995–2000
- Knut Kaasen 2001–2003
- Jon T. Johnsen 2004–2008
- Hans Petter Graver 2008–2015
- Dag Michalsen 2015–2019
- Ragnhild Hennum 2020–2025
- New Dean to be elected in June 2025 as Hennum is the new Rector as of 1 Aug 2025

== Notable academics ==
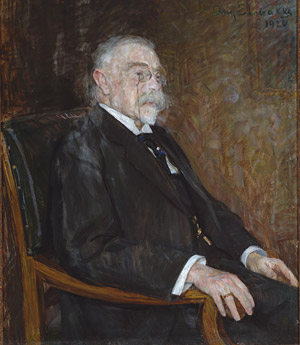
Bredo Henrik von Munthe af Morgenstierne, Professor of Jurisprudence from 1889, who served as the university's Rector and ex officio Dean of the Faculty of Law 1912–1918 (historically, the Rector was also Dean of his own faculty).

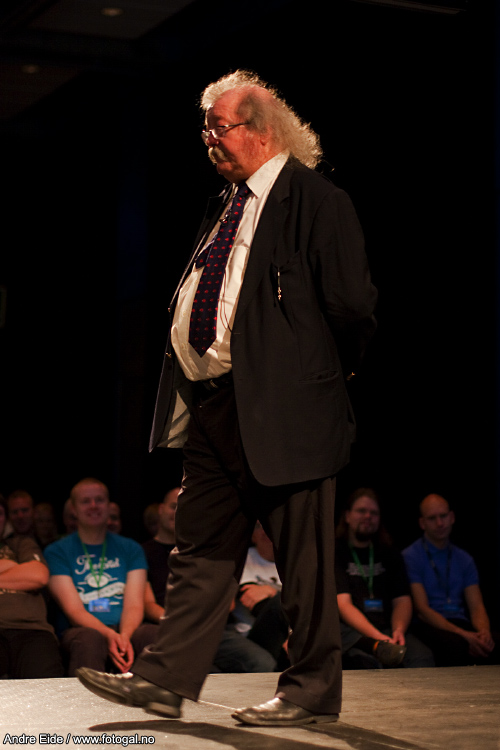
Jon Bing, Professor of Law at the Norwegian Research Center for Computers and Law, and who is also a science fiction writer, is internationally recognised as a pioneer of information/communication technology law

Prior to 1990, all professors (i.e. full professors, the only ones who are called "professors" in Norway) were appointed by the King-in-Council to their chairs, but today, new Professors are appointed directly by the Faculty of Law. The positions below that of professor are called dosent (reader, abolished in 1985), førsteamanuensis (associate professor), and universitetslektor or amanuensis (lecturer or assistant professor). Temporary, qualifying positions are postdoktor (senior research fellow) and stipendiat (a research fellow enrolled in a doctoral programme). A small number of employees hold the title forsker (researcher) and usually have no teaching obligations; their formal qualifications may vary from the assistant professor level to the full professor level. Full professors with part-time positions (20% or less) are called professor II, but otherwise hold the same status as other professors; usually such professors hold a chair or main position at a different university or research institution.

Academics of note include

Law

- Claus Winter Hjelm
- Bredo Henrik von Munthe af Morgenstierne
- Francis Hagerup
- Frederik Stang
- Fredrik Stang
- Frede Castberg
- Johannes Andenæs
- Torstein Eckhoff
- Carl August Fleischer
- Mads H. Andenæs
- Tove Stang Dahl
- Jon Bing
- Peter Lødrup
- Frederik Zimmer
- Tone Sverdrup
- Lucy Smith
- Carsten Smith
- Eivind Smith
- Knut Selmer
- Sjur Brækhus
- Thor Falkanger
- Kirsti Strøm Bull
- Anders Bratholm
- Birger Stuevold Lassen
- Viggo Hagstrøm
- Henning Jakhelln
- Anne Hellum

Economics

- Anton Martin Schweigaard (Professor of Jurisprudence, Economics, and Statistics)
- Torkel Halvorsen Aschehoug (Professor of Jurisprudence, Economics, and Statistics)
- Oskar Jæger
- Ragnar Frisch
- Ingvar Wedervang
- Johan Einarsen

Criminology and Sociology of Law

- Nils Christie
- Thomas Mathiesen
- Vilhelm Aubert
- Kjersti Ericsson

== Notable alumni ==
From 1811 to 1980, the faculty educated all lawyers of Norway, and still educates around 75% of new legal candidates. Its alumni hence includes the vast majority of the country's preeminent legal professionals, including academics, supreme court justices, senior civil servants, and a large number of politicians, among them 11 Prime Ministers and many cabinet ministers.
