= Andenæs =

Andenæs is a Norwegian surname that may refer to:

- Ellen Holager Andenæs (born 28 August 1947), Norwegian jurist
- Henrik Andenæs (born 17 September 1950), Norwegian businessman
- Johannes Andenæs (1912–2003), Norwegian jurist
- June Andenæs (born 9 June 1983), retired Norwegian handball player
- Mads Andenæs (born 27 July 1957), legal academic
- Mads H. Andenæs (1940–2019), Norwegian legal academic, husband of Ellen and son of Johannes
- Ragnhild Andenæs (born 28 September 1977), Norwegian fencer
- Tønnes Andenæs (1855–1942), Norwegian jurist, book publisher and politician
