= Tidsskrift for Rettsvitenskap =

- Discipline: Law
- Language: Scandinavian (Danish, Norwegian, Swedish)
- Edited by: Viggo Hagstrøm

Publication details
- Former names: Tidsskrift for Retsvidenskab (1888–1932), Tidsskrift for Rettsvidenskap (1932–1939)
- History: 1888-present
- Publisher: Universitetsforlaget (Norway)
- Frequency: 5/year

Standard abbreviations
- ISO 4: Tidsskr. Rettsvitensk.
- NLM: Tidsskr Rettsvitenskap

Indexing
- ISSN: 0040-7143 (print); 1504-3096 (web)

Links
- Journal homepage; Online access

Tidsskrift for Rettsvitenskap (English: "Journal of Jurisprudence") is a Norwegian law journal. It was established in 1888 by Francis Hagerup to "form a link between legal research in the Nordic countries" and is currently published by Universitetsforlaget. The journal is one of Scandinavia's preeminent academic journals in the field of law. It is ranked as a Level 2 journal, the highest level in the official Norwegian ranking (the Norwegian Scientific Index). Articles are published in the three Scandinavian languages: Danish, Norwegian, and Swedish.

The original spelling of the journal name was Tidsskrift for Retsvidenskab, which was changed to Tidsskrift for Rettsvidenskap in 1932 and to Tidsskrift for Rettsvitenskap in 1940, i.e. from a Danish spelling to a modern Norwegian spelling.

== Editors-in-chief ==
The following persons have been editors-in-chief of the journal, most of them worked at the Faculty of Law, University of Oslo:

- Francis Hagerup 1888–1921
- Fredrik Stang 1922–1936
- Erik Solem 1939–1949
- Carl Jacob Arnholm ?–1962
- Knut Selmer 1963–1964
- Carsten Smith 1963–1973
- Birger Stuevold Lassen 1974–1999
- Viggo Hagstrøm 1999–2013
