= Harald K. Schjelderup =

Norwegian physicist, philosopher and psychologist

Harald Krabbe Schjelderup (21 May 1895 – 19 August 1974) was a Norwegian physicist, philosopher and psychologist. He worked with all three subjects on university level, but is best remembered as Norway's first professor of psychology.

He was born in Dybvaag Municipality as a son of bishop Kristian Schjelderup (1853–1913) and Hendy Hassel (1855–1922). He was a brother of Kristian Schjelderup Jr, he too a bishop. He finished his secondary education at Kristiansand Cathedral School in 1912, and graduated in physics from the Royal Frederick University. Here he also worked as research assistant of Lars Vegard. He also worked with anatomy, microscopy and philosophy. He released the paper Hovedlinjer i filosofiens utvikling fra midten av det 19. århundre til nutiden in 1916, and was hired as a research fellow in philosophy in 1917. In line with the tendency of the day, his philosophy was positivist and crossed into psychology. He studied experimental psychology in Copenhagen and Göttingen, and took the dr.philos. degree in 1919 with the thesis Til sansefornæmmelsernes psykofysiologi. He then studied in Berlin and Freiburg, and was appointed as a professor in 1922. After six years as a professor of philosophy, he became Norway's first professor of psychology in 1928. He worked at the Royal Frederick University (from 1939: the University of Oslo).

Among other things, Schjelderup learned psychoanalysis. He helped persons like Otto Fenichel and Wilhelm Reich to migrate from Nazi Germany to Norway. Then, after Nazi Germany invaded Norway in 1940, Schjelderup became leader of the university's Aksjonsutvalget, a resistance committee. Open protests ensued when the Nazi authorities were about to change the rules for admission to the university in autumn 1943. In retaliation, the authorities arrested 11 staff, 60 male students and 10 female students. The staff Johannes Andenæs, Bjørn Føyn, Johan Christian Schreiner, Eiliv Skard, Anatol Heintz, Odd Hassel, Ragnar Frisch, Carl Jacob Arnholm, Endre Berner and Harald K. Schjelderup were sent to Grini concentration camp. Schjelderup was first incarcerated at Bredtveit from 15 October to 22 November, then at Berg until 8 December, then at Grini until 5 May 1945. He also spent time at Victoria Terrasse under interrogation.

After the war Schjelderup returned as professor, and helped build and consolidate the university's psychology studies. He became professor emeritus in 1965. Important books include Psykologi (1927), Über drei Haupttypen der religiösen Erlebnisformen (1932, written with his brother), Innføring i psykologi (1957) and Det skjulte menneske (1961). He was a board member of the International Society for Clinical and Experimental Hypnosis, was a member of the Norwegian Academy of Science and Letters (1922) and the Finnish Academy of Science and Letters, and was decorated as a Knight 1st Class of the Order of St. Olav (1961). He was married twice, and died in August 1974 in Oslo. A building at the University of Oslo, Harald Schjelderups hus, bears his name.
