= Einarsen =

Einarsen is a surname. Notable people with the surname include:

- Birgitte Einarsen (born 1975), Norwegian singer
- Hanne Grete Einarsen (born 1966), Norwegian-Sami artist
- Inge Einarsen Bartnes (1911–1988), Norwegian politician
- Johan Einarsen (1903-1980), Norwegian jurist and economist
