= Endre Berner =

Norwegian organic chemist, author and educator

Endre Qvie Berner
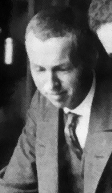
- Born: 24 September 1893; Stavanger, Norway
- Died: 30 January 1983 (aged 89); Oslo, Norway
- Education: Norwegian Institute of Technology
- Awards: Nansen medal for Outstanding Research - 1959; Order of St. Olav - 1969
- Scientific career
- Fields: Organic chemistry
- Workplaces: Norwegian Institute of Technology; Imperial College in London; University of Oslo

Endre Qvie Berner (24 September 1893 – 30 January 1983) was a Norwegian organic chemist, author and educator.

== Background ==
He was born in Stavanger as a son of businessperson Endre Qvie Berner, Sr. (1853–1925) and his wife Anna Marie Gjemre (1875–1958). He worked at a workshop after finishing middle school, and enrolled in machinery studies at Bergen Technical School in 1911, but switched to chemistry at the Norwegian Institute of Technology in 1913. He graduated in 1918, and was then hired as research assistant of his advisor Claus Nissen Riiber. In 1922 he was promoted to docent. He studied in Munich (with Richard Willstätter and Heinrich Otto Wieland) in 1922–1923 and 1928, and in Birmingham (with Norman Haworth) in 1929. He took the doctorate in 1926 with the thesis A Contribution to the Thermochemistry of Organic Compounds.

== Career ==
In 1934 he was appointed as professor at the University of Oslo. He is well known in the Nordic countries for his textbook Lærebok i organisk kjemi. The first modern Norwegian textbook in organic chemistry, it was first released in 1942 and then re-released several times, the last in 1964. The 1958 edition became known for introducing new Norwegian-language names of several chemical elements: hydrogen, nitrogen, karbon (carbon) og oksygen (oxygen).

During the occupation of Norway by Nazi Germany, his academic career was interrupted. When the Nazi authorities were about to change the rules for admission to the university in autumn 1943, a protest ensued. In retaliation, the authorities arrested 11 staff, 60 male students and 10 female students. The staff Johannes Andenæs, Eiliv Skard, Johan Christian Schreiner, Harald Krabbe Schjelderup, Anatol Heintz, Odd Hassel, Ragnar Frisch, Carl Jacob Arnholm, Bjørn Føyn and Endre Berner were sent to Grini concentration camp. Berner was first incarcerated at Berg concentration camp from 22 November 1943, then at Grini until 24 December 1944.

After the war Berner continued as professor at the University of Oslo until 1962, except for a stay at the Imperial College London from 1954 to 1955. He was also active as a professor emeritus until his death. He was elected as a member of the Royal Norwegian Society of Sciences and Letters in 1927, of the Norwegian Academy of Science and Letters in 1933 and of the Society of Chemical Industry in 1951. In 1959, he earned the Nansen medal for Outstanding Research and in 1969 he was decorated with the Order of St. Olav. He was the president of the Norwegian Chemical Society from 1946 to 1950, having co-founded the Trondheim branch of the society, and ultimately received honorary membership.

== Personal life ==
He was married twice, the first with Nathalia Adelaide Weidemann (1896-1930) in 1922; the second with Erna Gay (1909–2003) in 1930. He died during 1983 in Oslo and was buried at Vestre gravlund.
