= Marcus Pløen Ingstad =

Norwegian jurist and educator

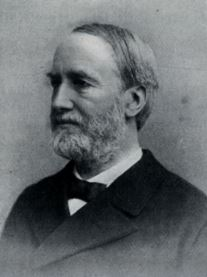

Dean of the University of Oslo Faculty of Law

Personal details
- Born: 18 August 1837 Oslo, Norway
- Died: 24 September 1918 (aged 81) Oslo, Norway
- Spouse: Dorothea Greve (m. 1839–1918)
- Education: University of Oslo; Uppsala University
- Occupation: Professor; Lawyer; Administrator

Marcus Pløen Ingstad (18 August 1837 – 24 September 1918) was a Norwegian jurist and educator. He was a legal historian and scholar who was the author of several books on Roman law. He served as a Professor of Jurisprudence and Dean of the Faculty of Law at the University of Oslo between 1870 and 1918.

== Biography ==
Ingstad was born in Christiania (now Oslo), Norway. He was the son of Fredrik Emil Ingstad (1808–77) and Louise Platou (1812–43). He attended the Royal Frederick University (now University of Oslo): cand.philos. (1856), cand.jur. (1861) and Uppsala University: Dr. jur. (1877).

Ingstad was a Professor of Jurisprudence at the Faculty of Law of the Royal Frederick University (1870–1918) and also served as Dean of the Faculty of Law. He was ordained an assessor in the Supreme Court of Norway (1880 and 1891). He was also a legal scholar and historian as well as the author of several books on Roman law.

== Personal life ==
He was married to Dorothea Greve from 1839 to 1918. They were the grandparents of Norwegian explorer Helge Marcus Ingstad.

== Selected works ==
- Forelæsninger over Den romerske arveret (1916)
- Forelæsninger over romersk familieret (1917)
- Den romerske privatrets almindelige del (1924)

Academic offices
Preceded by Frederik Peter Brandt	Dean of the Faculty of Law, The Royal Frederick University	Succeeded by Oskar Jæger
