= 1882 Norwegian parliamentary election =

- 1882

All 114 seats in the Storting 57 seats needed for a majority
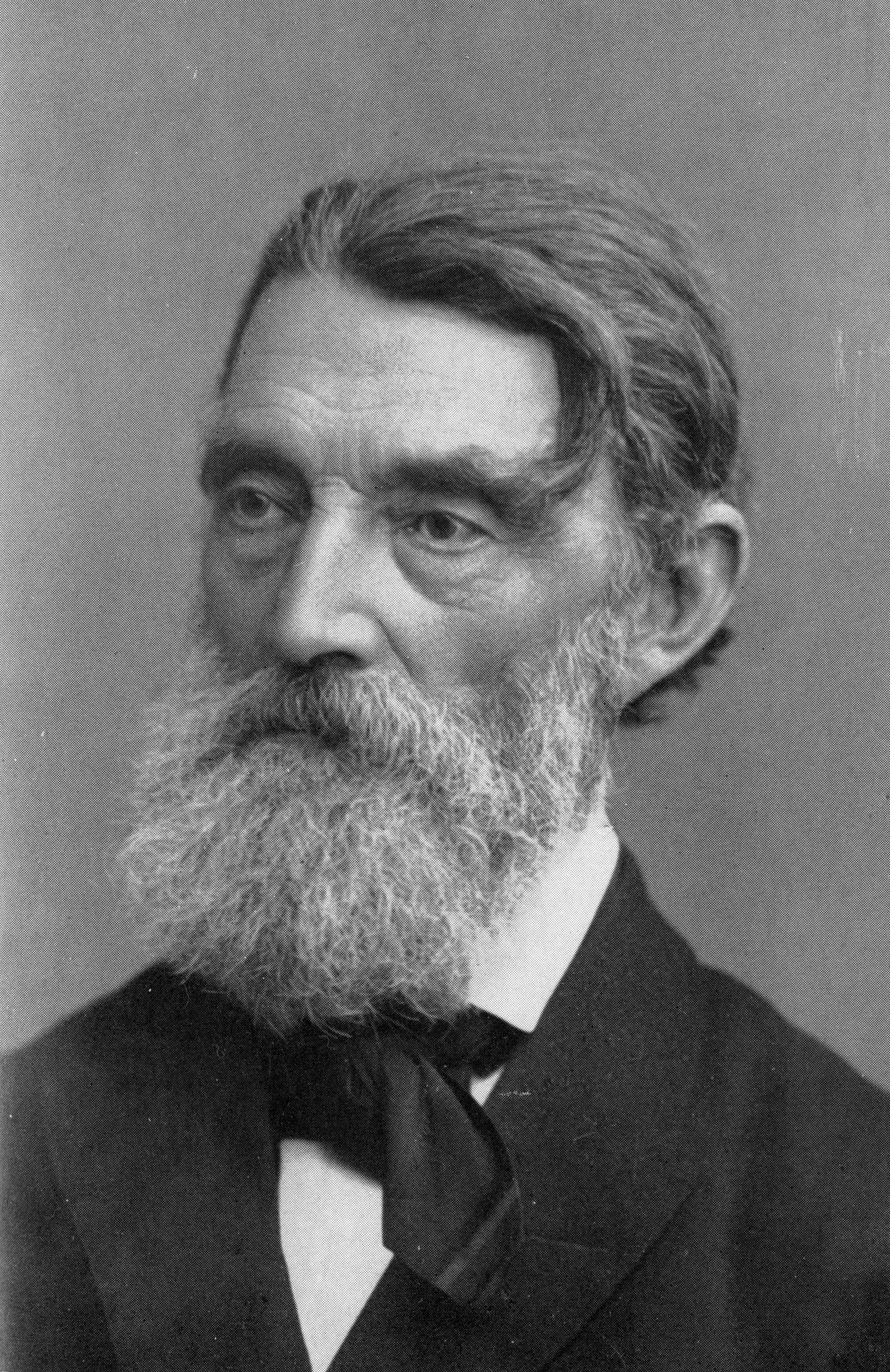

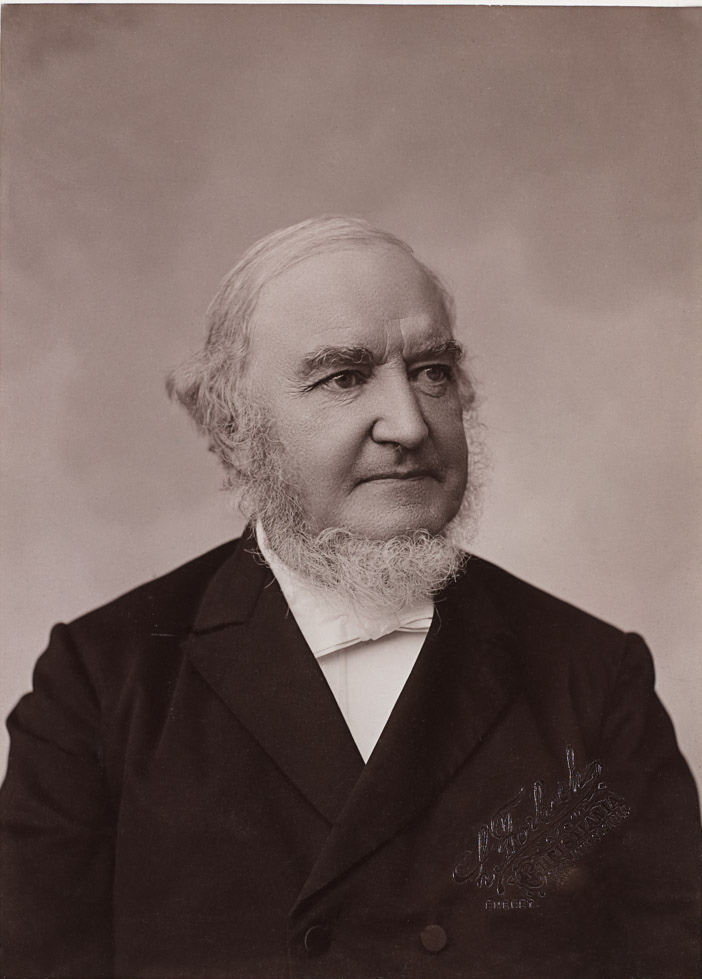
	First party	Second party
Leader	Johan Sverdrup	Torkel Halvorsen Aschehoug
Party	Liberal	Conservative
Seats won	83	31
Popular vote	44,803	26,501
Percentage	62.83%	37.17%

Parliamentary elections were held in Norway in 1882. Although political parties were not officially established until 1884, there were two broad movements already in existence - one supporting the Swedish King and the existing system, and one demanding reform.

The first political party in Norway, the Liberal Party, was established ahead of the next election. This led to MPs joining the party and forming a government led by Johan Sverdrup, which introduced parliamentarism to Norway on 26 June 1884.

== Results ==
Party	Votes	%	Seats
Liberals (those forming the Liberal Party in 1884)	44,803	62.83	83
Conservatives (those forming the Conservative Party in 1884)	26,501	37.17	31
Total	71,304	100.00	114
Valid votes	71,304	98.86	
Invalid/blank votes	824	1.14	
Total votes	72,128	100.00	
Registered voters/turnout	99,501	72.49	
Source: Nohlen & Stöver
