= Bjørn Føyn =

Norwegian zoologist

Bjørn Føyn (21 September 1898 – 8 January 1985) was a Norwegian zoologist, especially known for researching the genetics of algae.

He was born in Trondhjem as a son of educator and major Anton Christian Føyn (1865–1940) and Olga Barth Nielsen (1870–1959). He finished his secondary education at Trondhjem Cathedral School in 1918, and graduated from the Royal Frederick University with the cand.real. degree in 1927. He was a research assistant from 1923 to 1928 at the Royal Frederick University, and then under Max Hartmann at the Kaiser-Wilhelm-Institut für Biologie from 1929 to 1932. He was also a research fellow in Norway during this period, and from 1932 to 1937 he worked in Bergen. From 1938 to 1968 he was a professor at the University of Oslo. He was elected as a member of the Norwegian Academy of Science and Letters in 1938, and of the Zoologisch-Botanische Gesellschaft of Vienna in 1963.

He had taken the doctorate in 1935 with the thesis Lebenszyklus, Cytologie und Sexualität der Chiorophycee Cladophora Suhriana Kiltzing, on the algae Cladophora. Other notable publications include the textbook in biology for upper secondary schools; Biologi for gymnasiet ("Biology for the Gymnasium"), which was released for the first time in 1941 together with Trygve Braarud, and released for the last time in 1964. The popular work Norges dyreliv ("Animal Life of Norway") came in four volumes between 1947 and 1950, edited by Føyn together with Johan Huus, Gudrun Ruud and Hagbart Røise. It too was reissued later.

In the 1938 popular release Arvelæren, he criticized racial biology as practiced in Nazi Germany. Then, in World War II came the occupation of Norway by Nazi Germany. When the Nazi authorities were about to change the rules for admission to the university in autumn 1943, a protest ensued. In retaliation, the authorities arrested 11 staff, 60 male students and 10 female students. The staff Johannes Andenæs, Eiliv Skard, Johan Christian Schreiner, Harald Krabbe Schjelderup, Anatol Heintz, Odd Hassel, Ragnar Frisch, Carl Jacob Arnholm, Endre Berner and Bjørn Føyn were sent to Grini concentration camp. Føyn was first incarcerated at Bredtveit from 15 October to 22 November, then at Berg until 8 December, then at Grini until 24 December 1944.

Føyn married fellow science student Bibba Ruud (1900–1985) in 1927. Through her he was a brother-in-law of Johan T. Ruud. He was also a first cousin of Ernst Føyn. He died in January 1985 in Oslo.
