= Bredtveit Prison =

Norwegian prison

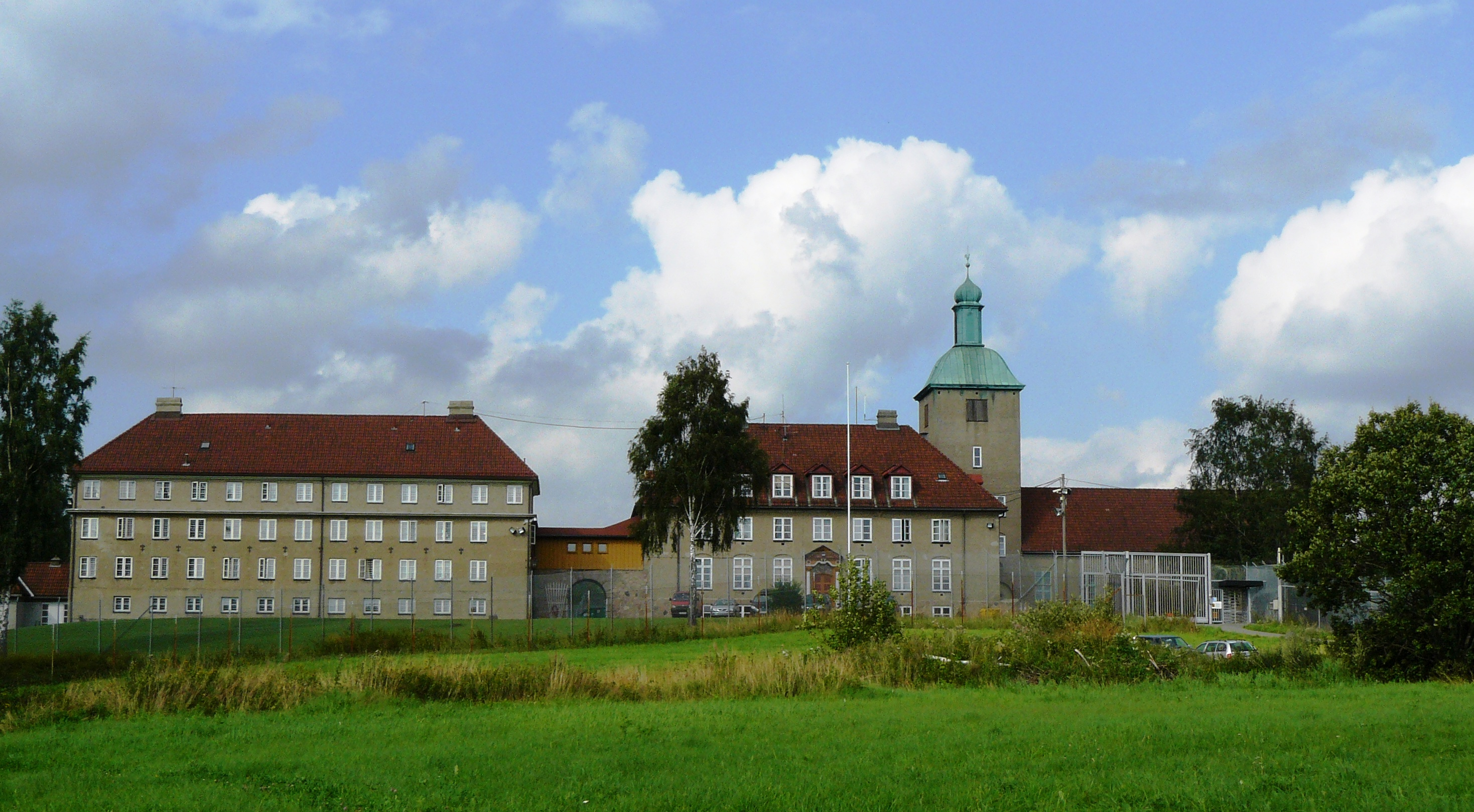
- Bredtveit Prison
- Interactive map of Bredtveit Prison
- Location: Oslo, Norway; 59°56′56″N 10°51′33″E
- Capacity: 312
- Opened: 1 January 1923; 103 years ago

Bredtveit Prison (formally Bredtveit Prison Service, Custody and Supervision Unit, Norwegian: Bredtveit fengsel, forvarings- og sikringsanstalt) is a prison located in the neighborhood of Bredtvet in Oslo, Norway. During World War II it was a concentration camp.

== Pre-World War II ==
It originated at Bredtvet farm as a learning home (lærehjem) for young boys, erected 1918 and in use from 1919 to 1923. In 1923 the state took over the property from Det norske lærehjem- og verneforbund. In 1929 it was proposed that the property be turned into a juvenile center teaching labour skills; the proposal accepted in 1939. This plan did not materialize, as the construction of the facility was halted by war.

== Concentration camp ==
In 1940, Norway was invaded and occupied by Nazi Germany. Beginning in 1941 the Nazi collaborationist party Nasjonal Samling used Bredtveit as a political prison. It bore a similarity to Falstad concentration camp, via the original purpose of the facility.

People incarcerated at Bredtveit during the war included several professors arrested during the crackdown on the University of Oslo in October 1943: Johan Christian Schreiner, Odd Hassel, Ragnar Frisch, Johannes Andenæs, Carl Jacob Arnholm, Bjørn Føyn, Eiliv Skard, Harald K. Schjelderup and Anatol Heintz. Also, a group of Jewish prisoners that arrived in Oslo after the departure of SS Donau were held at Bredtveit. They left Bredtveit on 24 February 1943, and were shipped towards Auschwitz on the following day. Personnel in the camp included physician Hans Eng.

== Post-World War II ==
In 1945, after the war was over, Bredtveit was used as a prison for women whom awaited trial for collaboration, as a part of the legal purge in Norway after World War II. Later, politician Aaslaug Aasland served as prison director in the initial period. From 1949 it was a general women's prison and included a facility for forced labour. Forced labour ceased to exist in Norway in 1970, whereupon the prison was renamed Bredtveit fengsel og sikringsanstalt. It is one of three women's prisons in Norway, the others being Sandefjord and Ravneberget. It has a capacity of 54 inmates.

Amongst the people incarcerated at Bredtveit after the war were included Veronica Orderud and Kristin Kirkemo, who were convicted in the Orderud murder case.
