= Ingstad =

Ingstad may refer to:

- 8993 Ingstad, a main-belt asteroid, named after Helge Ingstad

== People ==
- Helge Ingstad (1899–2001), Norwegian explorer
- Marcus Pløen Ingstad (1837–1918), Norwegian professor of law and legal scholar
- Anne Stine Ingstad (1918–1997), Norwegian archaeologist and wife of Helge Ingstad
- Vilde Ingstad (born 1994), Norwegian handball player
