= Brækhus =

Brækhus is a Norwegian surname. Notable people with the surname include:

- Cecilia Brækhus (born 1981), Norwegian boxer
- Sjur Brækhus (1918–2009), Norwegian legal judge and scholar
- Stein Inge Brækhus (born 1967), Norwegian jazz musician
