= Heinrich Jacob Goldschmidt =

Austrian-born, Norwegian chemist

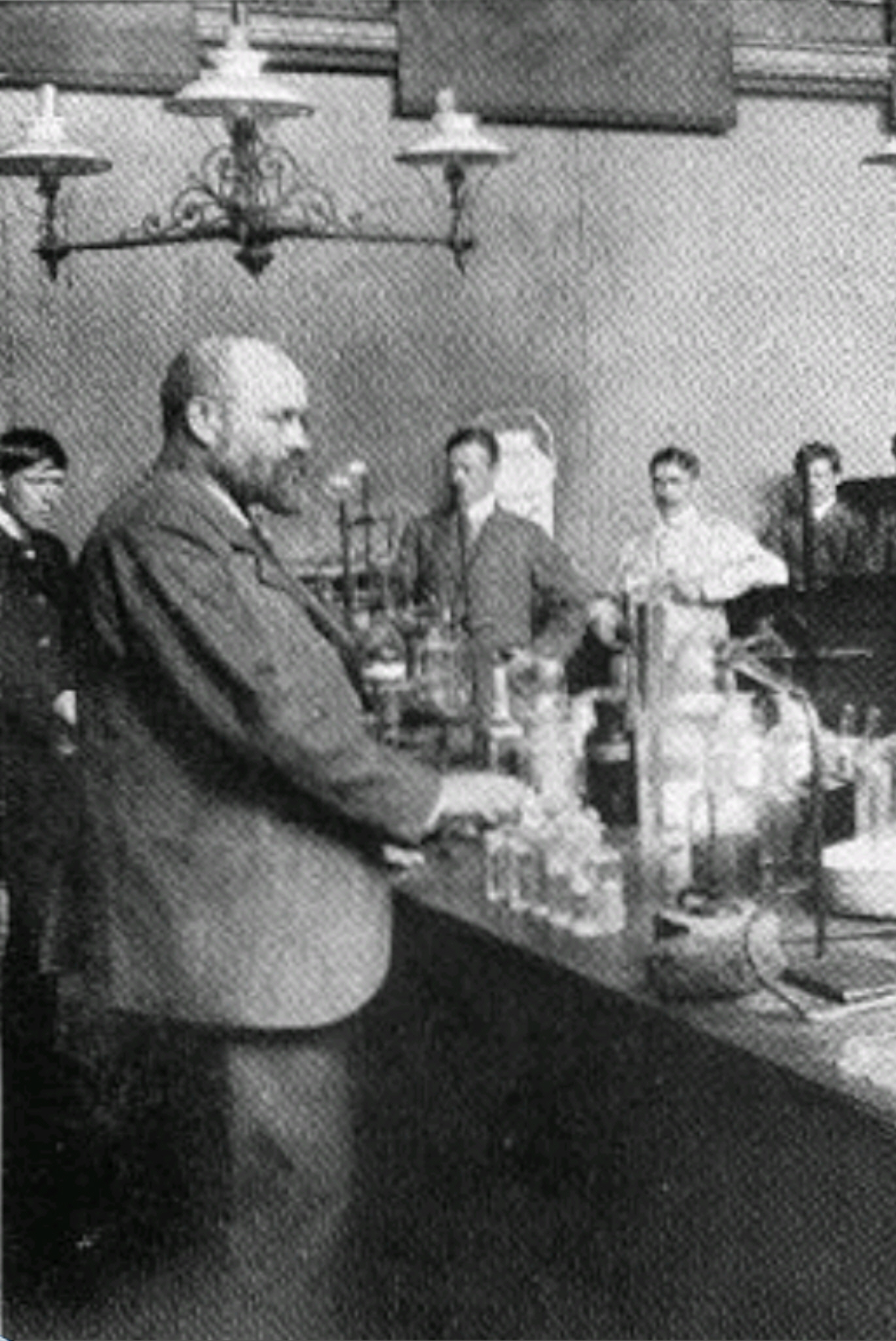
- Goldschmidt c.1902
- Born: 12 April 1857; Prague, Austria-Hungary
- Died: 20 September 1937 (aged 80); Oslo, Norway
- Education: Charles University in Prague
- Scientific career
- Fields: Chemistry
- Workplaces: University of Amsterdam, ETH Zurich, University of Oslo
- Doctoral students: Odd Hassel

Heinrich Jacob Goldschmidt, also Heinrich Jakob Goldschmidt (12 April 1857, in Prague, Austria-Hungary – 20 September 1937, in Oslo, Norway), was a Jewish Austrian chemist who spent most of his career working in Norway.

He studied chemistry at the Charles University in Prague, where he received his PhD in 1881. In the same year, he became professor at the ETH Zürich, where he worked with Victor Meyer. In 1888, his son Victor Goldschmidt was born; Victor later became a renowned mineralogist and founder of modern geochemistry. After working at the University of Amsterdam with Jacobus Henricus van 't Hoff in 1894 and 1895, Heinrich Goldschmidt became a full professor at the ETH. He left the ETH in 1901 for the University of Oslo. He worked there until his retirement in 1929 at the age of 72. As his son Victor became a professor for mineralogy at the University of Göttingen in 1929, he moved with him to Göttingen, but both had to leave there after the Nazis came to power, and father and son returned to Oslo in 1935. Heinrich Jacob Goldschmidt died in Oslo in 1937.

Goldschmidt was the thesis advisor for Nobel laureate Odd Hassel.

== See also ==
- Victor Goldschmidt
