= Knut Selmer =

Norwegian legal scholar

Knut Sejersted Selmer (7 November 1924 – 25 March 2009) was a Norwegian legal scholar.

He was born in Aker as a son of professor Ernst Westerlund Selmer (1890–1971) and Ella Sejersted (1895–1968), and was the brother of Ernst Sejersted Selmer. He was a grandnephew of Johan Selmer and Jens Selmer and a first cousin of Francis Sejersted. He finished his secondary education at the Haagaas School in 1944 and graduated with the cand.jur. degree in 1949. He was a deputy judge in Nord-Troms and Fredrikstad between 1949 and 1952. In January 1950 he married Elisabeth Schweigaard.

He was a research fellow at the University of Oslo from 1953 to 1959, took the dr.juris degree in 1958 on the thesis The Survival of General Average. A Necessity or an Anachronism?, and also had an average adjuster exam from 1954. He was appointed as a professor of insurance law at the University of Oslo in 1959, and remained here until 1989. He served as dean from 1970 to 1973. His fields in addition to insurance law were maritime law, tort, computer law and privacy law. His best known book was Forsikringsrett (1982), and he also expanded on Ragnar Knoph's basic law book together with Birger Stuevold Lassen, issued the fourth through seventh editions of Knophs oversikt over Norges rett between 1966 and 1975.

Together with Jon Bing he organized the "department for EDB issues" in 1971, the current Norwegian Research Center for Computers and Law, creating one of the world's first centres of research into that type of issues. Selmer he has also chaired the boards of the Norwegian Data Inspectorate and Lovdata.

He was a member of the Norwegian Academy of Science and Letters from 1961 and was decorated as a Knight, First Class of the Royal Norwegian Order of St. Olav in 1993 as well as with the Defence Medal 1940–1945. He died in March 2009 in Oslo. A bust of him is located at the Norwegian Research Center for Computers and Law.

Academic offices
Preceded by Johannes Andenæs	Dean of the Faculty of Law, University of Oslo; 1970–1973	Succeeded by
