= Johannes Andenæs =

Norwegian jurist and professor

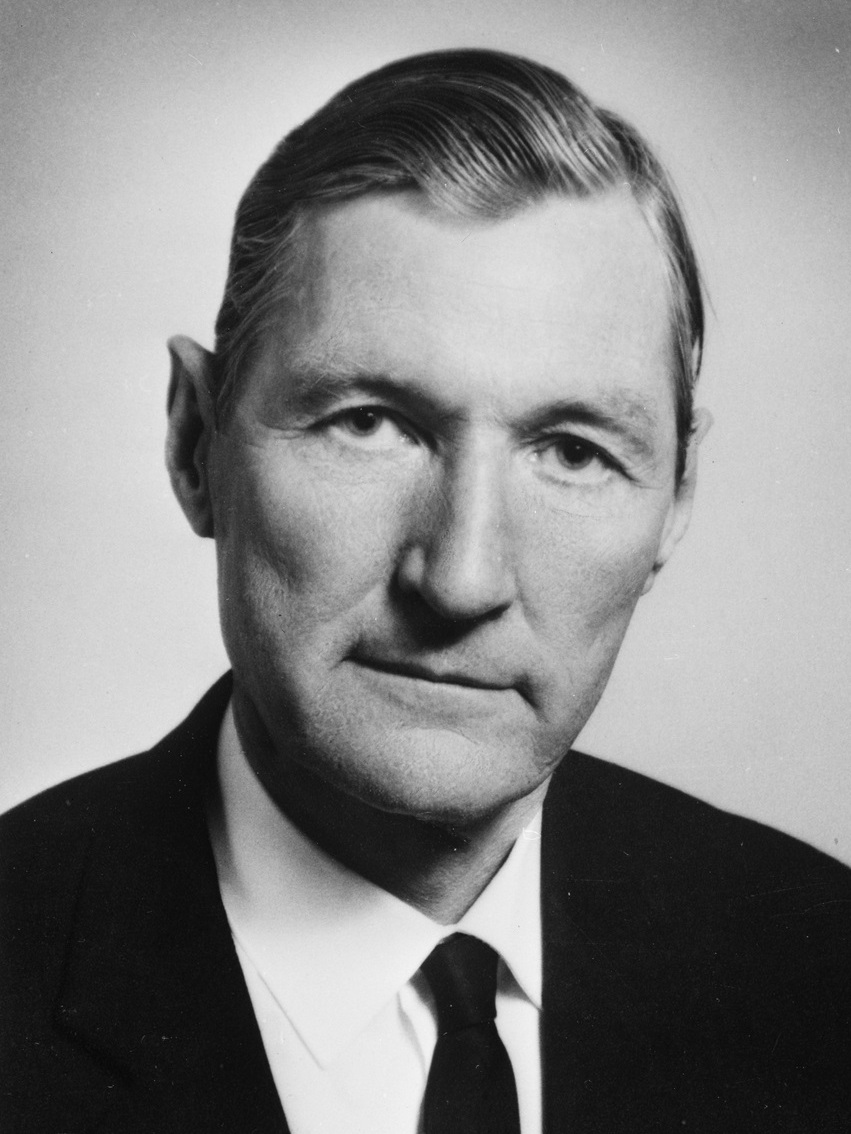
- Born: Johannes Bratt Andenæs; 7 September 1912; Innvik, Norway
- Died: 3 July 2003 (aged 90)
- Occupation: jurist
- Children: Mads H. Andenæs
- Awards: Order of St. Olav (1986); Fritt Ord Honorary Award (1985)

Johannes Bratt Andenæs, often shortened to Johs. Andenæs (7 September 1912 – 3 July 2003) was a Norwegian jurist. He was a professor of jurisprudence at the University of Oslo from 1945 to 1982, and served as rector from 1970 to 1972.

== Pre-war career ==
He was born in Innvik as a son of vicar Mads Olsen Andenæs (1855–1942) and Signe Theoline Mydland (1883–1958). He was a brother of Tønnes Andenæs. He finished his secondary education at Stabekk in 1929, enrolled at the Royal Frederick University and graduated from there with the cand.jur. degree in 1935. He worked as a deputy judge in Moss and Harstad before studying further, abroad. In June 1939 in Horten he married fellow jurist Ida Johanne Røren (1913–2008). He was hired as lecturer and research fellow at the University of Oslo in 1939, and took the dr.juris degree in 1943 with the thesis Straffbar unnlatelse.

== World War II ==
Andenæs applied to become docent in 1940 and professor in 1942, at the University of Oslo, but his candidacy was rejected both times due to the German occupation of Norway. He had participated in battles against the Wehrmacht in the Norwegian campaign, being lightly wounded near Skarnes. During the occupation, then, he marked himself as an oppositional person at the university. When the Nazi authorities were about to change the rules for admission to the university, in autumn 1943, a protest ensued. In retaliation, the authorities arrested 11 staff, 60 male students and 10 female students. The staff Carl Jacob Arnholm, Eiliv Skard, Johan Christian Schreiner, Harald Krabbe Schjelderup, Anatol Heintz, Odd Hassel, Ragnar Frisch, Bjørn Føyn, Endre Berner and Johannes Andenæs were sent to Grini concentration camp. Andenæs was first incarcerated at Bredtveit from 15 October to 22 November, then at Berg until 8 December, then at Grini until 24 December 1944.

== Post-war career ==
In 1945 he was a consultant in the Office of the Director of Public Prosecutions, where the work with the legal purge in Norway after World War II had started. He was critical to facets of this legal purge, especially the fact that mere membership in Nasjonal Samling was punished harshly and how capital punishment was used. His 1979 book Det vanskelige oppgjøret is about the legal purge.

One of his first releases after the war was Statsforfatningen i Norge, partly written during his incarceration at Grini. He was also given his professorship, already on 29 June 1945 (the war ended on 8 May). In 1946 he was elected as a member of the Norwegian Academy of Science and Letters. He served as dean at the Faculty of Law from 1959 to 1960 and 1968 to 1969, prorector from 1960 to 1962 and rector from 1970 to 1972, and praeses of the Norwegian Academy of Science and Letters from 1977 to 1981. He was a visiting scholar at the University of Pennsylvania (1963), the University of Chicago (1968) and All Souls College (1971), and held honorary degrees at the University of Copenhagen (1970) and the University of Uppsala (1977). He retired as a professor in 1982. He was also Acting Supreme Court Justice for some time. He was a member of Straffelovrådet, chaired Nordisk kriminologisk samarbeidsråd from 1962 to 1965 and Norsk kriminalistforening from 1947 to 1957. He served as a deputy representative to the Parliament of Norway from Oslo, representing the Liberal Party, during the term 1958–1961. In 1996 Andenæs publicly stated that Norway should decriminalise drug use, and that in the future, drug prohibition would be regarded as a wrongful use of punishment.

He was decorated as a Commander with Star of the Royal Norwegian Order of St. Olav in 1986. In 1985 he received the Fritt Ord Honorary Award. He was also elected as a member of the exclusive social club SK Ull in 1949. He died in July 2003 in Oslo.

Andenæs was the father of legal academic Mads H. Andenæs, and through him the father-in-law of Ellen Holager Andenæs.

== Select bibliography ==
This section lists his most notable works:

- Straffbar unnlatelse (1943)
- Statsforfatningen i Norge (1st ed. 1945, 8th ed. 1998)
- Alminnelig strafferett (1st ed. 1956, 4th ed. 1997)
- Norsk straffeprosess in two volumes (1st ed. 1962, 2nd ed. 1994)
- Det vanskelige oppgjøret (1979)
- Innføring i rettsstudiet (1st ed. 1979, 6th ed. 2002)
- Spesiell strafferett with Anders Bratholm (1st ed. 1983, 3rd ed. 1996)
- 70 works by Andenæs

Academic offices
Preceded by	Dean of the Faculty of Law, University of Oslo; 1959–1960	Succeeded by
Preceded by Sjur Brækhus	Dean of the Faculty of Law, University of Oslo; 1968–1969	Succeeded by Knut Selmer
Preceded by Hans Vogt	Rector of the University of Oslo; 1970–1972	Succeeded by Otto Bastiansen
