= Viggo Hagstrøm =

Norwegian legal scholar

Viggo Hagstrøm (16 February 1954, Oslo – 19 January 2013) was a Norwegian legal scholar, and professor of law at the Department of Private Law at the University of Oslo Faculty of Law.

He obtained the cand.jur. degree in 1979, and was appointed lecturer in law at the University of Oslo in 1980. In 1985, he obtained the dr.juris degree and was appointed as associate professor. He became professor of law, particularly property law, in 1988. He was head of department for the Department of Private Law 1992–2000. He was a member of the Study Group on a European Civil Code. He was a member of the Norwegian Academy of Science and Letters and held an honorary doctorate at the University of Copenhagen. He was editor-in-chief of Tidsskrift for Rettsvitenskap (from 1999).

Hagstrøm died on 19 January 2013, after having been in a coma since November the previous year because of choking on an item of food served during a publisher's dinner.

== Selected works ==
- Obligasjonsrett, Universitetsforlaget, 2011, ISBN 978-82-15-01776-1, 968 pages.
- Kjøpsrett, Universitetsforlaget, 2005, ISBN 82-15-00736-8, 310 pages.
- Obligasjonsrett, Universitetsforlaget, 2003, ISBN 82-518-4023-6, 937 pages.
