= Peter Lødrup =

Norwegian legal scholar and judge

Peter Lødrup (29 August 1932 – 16 June 2010) was a Norwegian legal scholar and judge.

He was born in Bærum and grew up in Oslo as a son of district stipendiary magistrate Mentz Darre Lødrup (1901–1968) and writer Evi Bøgenæs Lødrup (1906–1985). He finished his secondary education at Frogner School in 1951 and graduated with the cand.jur. degree in 1957. He was hired as a research assistant at the University of Oslo in the same year. In March 1958 he married Grethe Faye.

He took the dr.juris degree in 1966 with the thesis Luftrett og ansvar, was a deputy judge from 1966 to 1967 and a docent at the University of Oslo from 1966 to 1967. From 1970 to his retirement in 2002 he was a professor, and he also served as dean from 1980 to 1985 and member of the Academic Collegium (the university board). His special fields were tort, family law, inheritance and aerial law, and he is notable for his textbooks. Notable books include Luftrett (1962 and a second volume in 1975), Barn og foreldre (7th edition 2006), Lærebok i erstatningsrett (6th edition 2009), Arverett (5th edition 2008) and Familieretten (6th edition 2009). He also edited Norsk lovkommentar with Knut Kaasen and Steinar Tjomsland.

He was a member of the Norwegian Academy of Science and Letters from 1974 and also of the Finnish Academy of Science and Letters, was secretary-general and president of the International Society of Family Law from 1975 to 1991. He held an honorary degree at Lund University since 1993.

He was a judge in the probate court in Oslo, and an acting Supreme Court Justice on five occasions between 1991 and 1998. He chaired Unifor, an administrative foundation for funds and endowments concerning the University of Oslo. He was decorated as a Knight, First Class of the Royal Norwegian Order of St. Olav, and died in June 2010.

Academic offices
Preceded by	Dean of the Faculty of Law, University of Oslo; 1980–1985	Succeeded by
