= Bredtvet =

Neighborhood of Oslo, Norway

Coordinates: 59°56′53″N 10°51′35″E

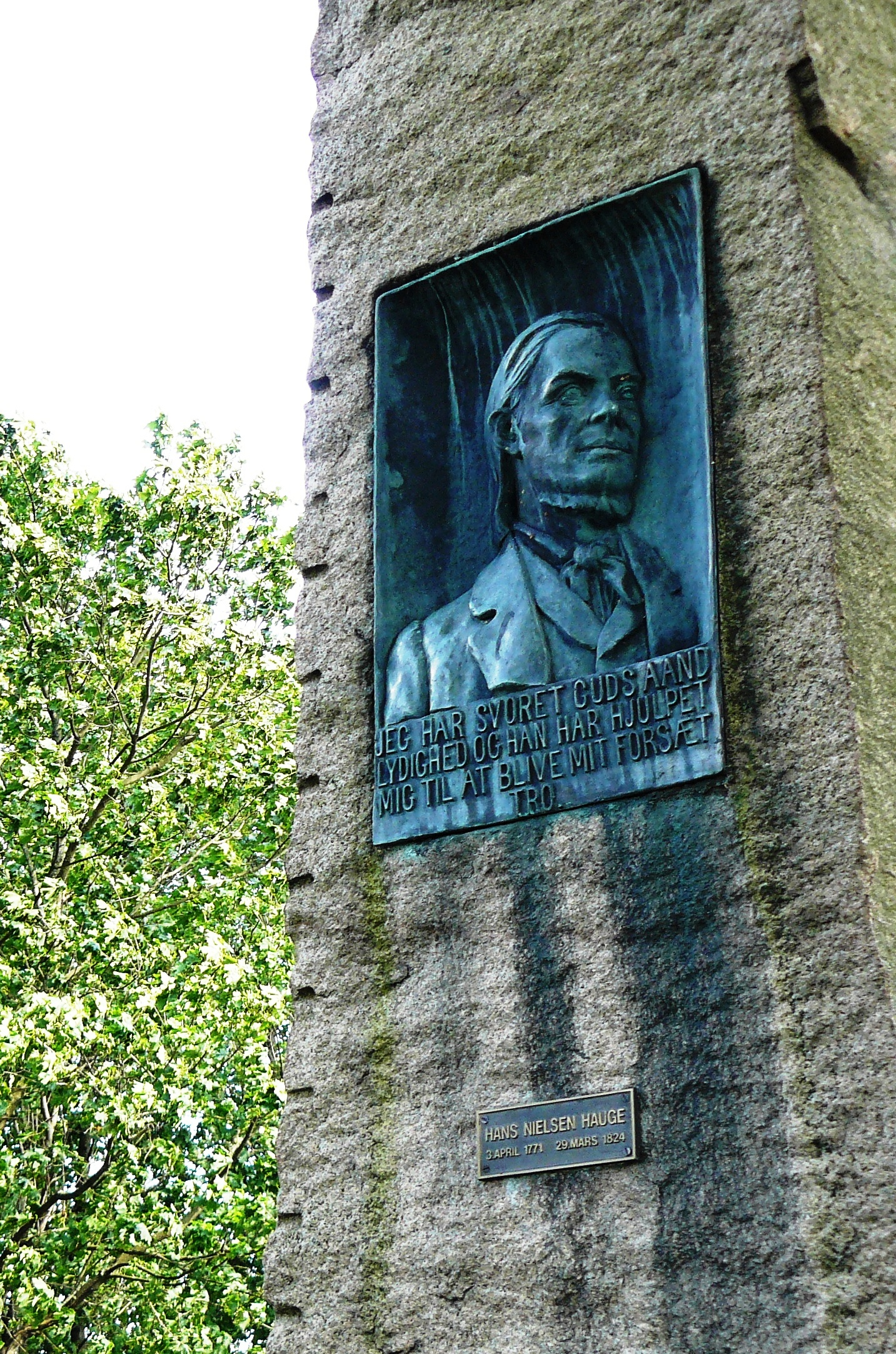
Obelisk at Bredtvet Church erected in memory of Hans Nielsen Hauge

Bredtvet is a neighborhood in the borough of Bjerke in Oslo, Norway.

The area is located on a ridge between the neighborhoods of Veitvet to the west and Kalbakken to the east. Its origin was as a farm of the same name. It is not mentioned in writings from the Middle Ages, but was at one time Crown land. Its first private owner is registered in 1662, and from 1817 to 1824 it was owned by Hans Nielsen Hauge.

Bredtvet is also a parish in the Church of Norway, created in 1966 although Bredtvet church (Bredtvet kirke) was not erected until 1977. An obelisk with commemorative plaque honoring Hauge was raised in the church garden. Bredtvet is also known as the site of Bredtveit prison. An upper secondary school named Bredtvet was established in 1972, but closed down in 2008.
