= Universitetsplassen =

Square in Oslo, Norway

Coordinates: 59°54′54.25″N 10°44′5.67″E

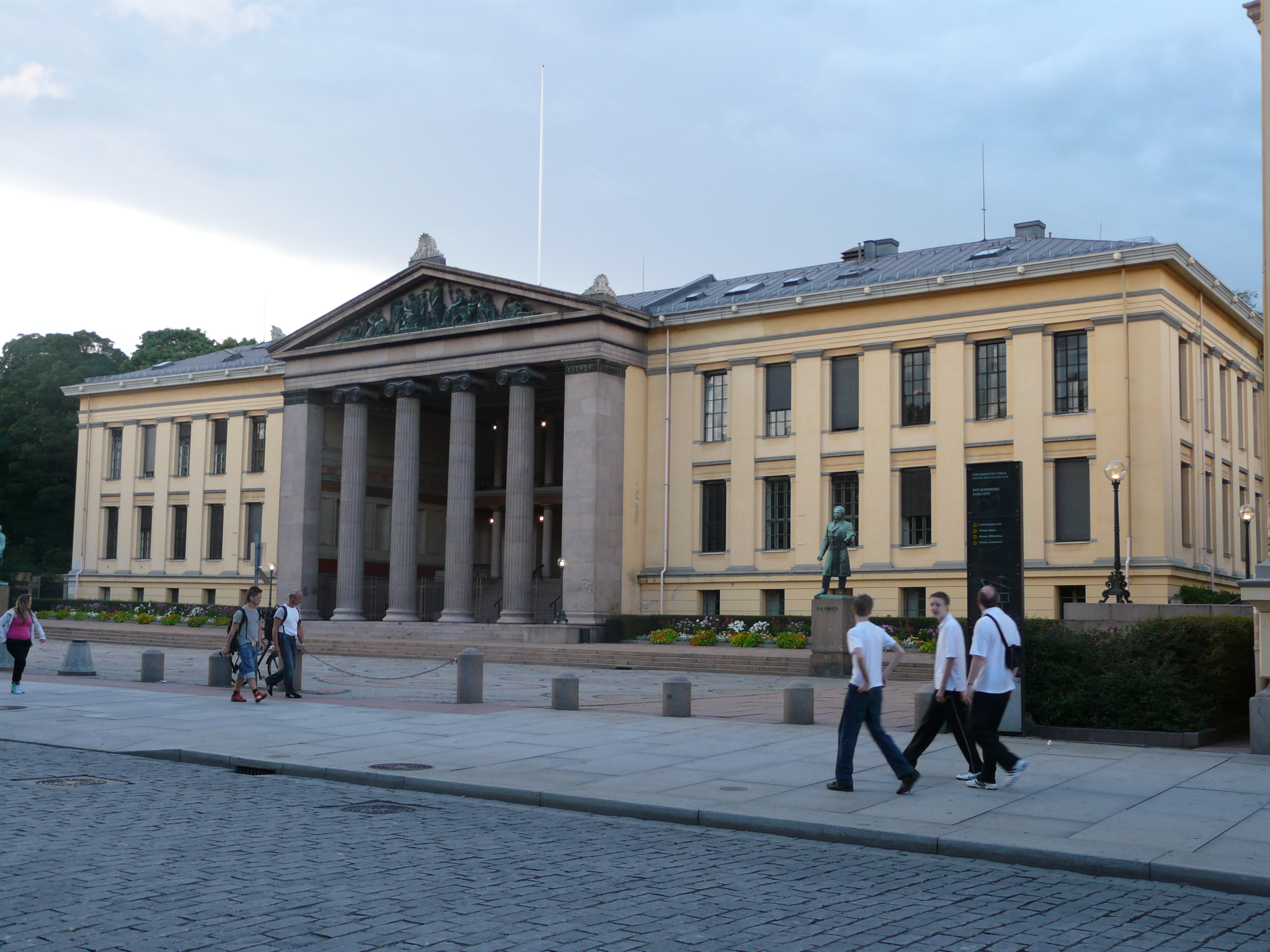
A university building facing the square

Universitetsplassen (University Square) is a square in the city center of Oslo, Norway. The square borders the street Karl Johans gate, and is surrounded by three buildings of the Faculty of Law, University of Oslo.
