= Norwegian Research Center for Computers and Law =

Norwegian Research Center for Computers and Law (Norwegian: Senter for rettsinformatikk, SERI) at the Faculty of Law, University of Oslo is the second-oldest academic institution in the world working specifically with the interrelationship of law and information / communication technology. Today, the NRCCL is one of the world leading institutions in the field of information/communication technology law.

NRCCL's main areas of research are media law and Internet governance, legal technology, electronic commerce, eGovernment, data protection and information security. The center offers a LL.M.-degree in Information and Communication Technology Law.

The center was founded by Professor Knut S. Selmer and Professor Jon Bing. Professor Knut S. Selmer was succeeded by Professor Jon Bing as Chair of the Centre in 1989. The present Chair of the NRCCL is professor Lee Andrew Bygrave.

== See also ==
- IT law
