= Natascha Heintz =

Norwegian paleontologist (1930–2025)

- Born: 25 February 1930; New York
- Died: 28 November 2025 (aged 95); Bærum, Norway
- Occupation: Paleontologist
- Father: Anatol Heintz

Natascha Heintz (25 February 1930 – 28 November 2025) was a Norwegian paleontologist.

== Life and career ==
Born in New York City, Heintz grew up in Bærum, a daughter of Anatol Heintz and Mary Solnørdal. She was married to geologist Thor Siggerud.

Her scientific research specialized in fossil fish. She worked for the Paleontologisk Museum in Oslo from 1967 to 2000. She has been editor of the Norwegian Journal of Geology, was a member of several governmental committees, and was an honorary member of Norges Museumsforbund.

Heintz died in Bærum on 28 November 2025, at the age of 95.
