= Legal education in Norway =

Legal education in Norway refers to a graduate professional degree that qualifies the holder for the legal profession, that includes advocates (barristers/attorneys-at-law), judges and other professions that lawyers have a legal monopoly on. Norway has a united and regulated legal profession where all lawyers hold the same professional degree obtained after an integrated and comprehensive 5-year (formerly 6-year) university programme with highly competitive admission requirements, that gives the right to use the legally protected title lawyer (Norwegian: jurist) and in itself qualifies for entry-level legal practice, i.e. the entry-level positions in the legal profession such as associate advocate (Norwegian: advokatfullmektig), deputy judge (Norwegian: dommerfullmektig) or junior prosecutor (Norwegian: politifullmektig). Norwegian lawyers are organized in the trade union Norges Juristforbund (Norwegian Association of Lawyers).

Norway's legal system and education share many similarities with those of Denmark due to the countries' common history. The traditional purpose of legal education is to educate advocates, judges, prosecutors as well as senior civil servants and diplomats; however many lawyers go on to work in other professions, including the corporate sector. Up until 2021, the only universities permitted to offer a professional legal degree were the University of Oslo, the University of Bergen and the University of Tromsø, and the program is one of the most competitive university programmes at any Norwegian university, and particularly at the University of Oslo. Those admitted to the law programme at the University of Oslo have the highest grade in all subjects from high school and are usually the best in their class at high school level. From the fall of 2023, there are six institutions offering a full legal education in Norway. Those are the University of Oslo, The University of Bergen, The University of Tromsø, The University of Stavanger, The University of Agder and BI.

A professional legal degree is a generalist education that offers a broad introduction to different legal fields, such as contract law, torts, family law, constitutional law, administrative law, procedural law, criminal law, European law, human rights and international law. Currently the degree requires four years of mostly mandatory subjects, and a final year consisting of a master's thesis or a master's thesis and elective courses. Prior to 2004–2007, students were awarded a Candidate of Law (cand.jur.) degree; the name of the degree was then changed to Master of Laws (master i rettsvitenskap). Both degrees are often translated as JD, LL.M. in English, where the first four years are regarded as equivalent to an American JD while the final year(s) is considered to correspond to an LL.M. Those holding the professional law degree are considered fully qualified lawyers in Norway. Only about 25–30% of Norwegian lawyers are advocates, i.e. called to the bar, and admission is dependent on holding a specific entry-level position usually as an associate advocate for a fixed period of time. The Norwegian legal profession is less focused on the court system as the only career path, and many lawyers work in the civil service, the corporate sector, organizations, academia or other sectors of society without becoming advocates; all lawyers enjoy high societal prestige on account of their professional qualification. All lawyers in Norway have the right to offer legal advice to clients, and all lawyers may appear in court with permission from the court regardless of whether they are advocates. A 2022 reform aimed at promoting innovation in the legal industry envisions legal services increasingly being offered by lawyers who are not advocates, and in cooperation with allied professions (e.g. accountants) and the technology sector.

== History ==
The Candidate of Law (cand.jur.) degree was established in 1736 at the University of Copenhagen, the common and only university of Denmark-Norway. In 1811 the Royal Frederick University (now the University of Oslo) was established in Christiania (now Oslo). From then on legal education was offered by the Faculty of Law of the Royal Frederick's University based on the traditional curriculum of the University of Copenhagen.

During the 19th century lawyers played a particularly dominating role in Norwegian society, and Norway was described as a "civil servant state" with civil servants, especially lawyers, as "the most enduring, consistent and visible elite." The University of Oslo's Faculty of Law remained the country's only law faculty until 1980. It remains the country's highest ranked and most prestigious law faculty and one of the leading law faculties in Scandinavia, and its law programme is one of the most competitive programmes to get into at any Norwegian university, with an acceptance rate of about 10%. The Faculty of Law at the University of Oslo is therefore often considered the country's only first-tier law faculty.

From 1980, the University of Bergen and the University of Tromsø also established law faculties and started to offer legal education. Admission is also very competitive, albeit somewhat behind the University of Oslo, with an acceptance rate of about 20% and about 15%, respectively. In 2023, The University of Stavanger, The University of Agder and BI began offering a full legal education (master's degree in law which qualifies for the title "jurist" and "advokat")

In general, foreign degrees do not qualify for admission to the legal profession in Norway. However, since the 1990s licensed advocates (barristers, attorneys) from member states of the European Economic Area may be licensed to practice in Norway under certain conditions, that includes sufficient familiarity with Norwegian law and command of the Norwegian (Scandinavian) language (Danish and Swedish speakers are not expected to speak in Norwegian as the languages are mutually intelligible). Holders of professional legal degrees from the European Economic Area may also be admitted as trainee advocates under certain conditions. Due to the similarity of their legal systems as well as languages, foreign lawyers practising in Norway are mostly Danish or Swedish. Correspondingly, Norwegian lawyers may be licensed to practice in Denmark and Sweden. A Norwegian professional legal degree is the only degree that qualifies for the positions of judge and prosecutor, although there have been rare exceptions made for Danish and Swedish lawyers (for example Karin M. Bruzelius, a supreme court justice educated in Sweden).

== Professional law programme ==
The professional law programme is an integrated 5-year university programme with roots dating back to 1736, and up until 2021, it was the only programme that qualified for admission to the legal profession and the protected title lawyer (jurist). Today, it is also possible to become "jurist" and "advokat" through the standard bachelors degree (3 years) and master's degree (2 years). Graduates may go on to practise law as advocates (barristers), join the judiciary as judges or work as prosecutors, although many also join the civil service or corporate sector.

Students may call themselves stud.jur., a title that designates a student on a professional law programme.

== Non-qualifying courses in legal subjects ==
Additionally, some new universities and colleges have started offering some courses in legal topics that do not qualify for admission to the legal profession or the title jurist (lawyer). They include the Inland Norway University of Applied Sciences, Molde University College and the University of South-Eastern Norway. The admission requirements are lower than for the professional programme at the six established universities. Students may not call themselves stud.jur., a title that designates a student on a professional law programme and that is directly linked to the former degree cand.jur., and are thus not generally referred to as "law students," but rather with specific titles denoting the specific programme, e.g. "bachelor's student in business law". Graduates may not give the impression of being lawyers, hold legal qualifications, offer legal advice or appear in court, and are not qualified for any of the jobs that law graduates have a monopoly on. It is a crime in Norway to use the title "lawyer" without being a graduate of the professional law programme at the three established universities.

== Grade system ==
The law faculties in Norway have long used grades differently than other faculties in Norway. This is still the case. At the University of Oslo, where all those who are accepted to the law programme have an average grade from high school equal to or even higher than the highest grade and are usually the best in their class at high school level, most law students receive the grades C or D. Accordingly C is considered a better than average grade at the University of Oslo's law faculty, while D is considered a normal grade. Very few law students receive the grades A or B. This stands in contrast to other institutions or fields of study, where A and B may be more common grades. The law faculties share the exceptionally high admission requirements with the medical faculties. In medicine there is a strong tradition in Norway of considering all doctors as part of an educational elite and placing little emphasis on university-level grades due to the very high admission requirements, and this culture of emphasizing that all graduates are highly accomplished has also become more prevalent in the legal field as admission requirements to the law programme became extremely high.
