= Carl Jacob Arnholm =

Norwegian jurist (1899–1976)

Carl Jacob Arnholm (18 December 1899 – 15 September 1976) was a Norwegian jurist.

He was born in Oslo to civil servant Carsten Johannes Andersen (1865–1950) and Gunvor Henriksen (1866–1940). He completed his secondary education in Kristiania in 1917, and graduated with the cand.jur. degree in 1921. After one year as deputy judge, he worked as a junior solicitor from 1923. From 1927, he was entitled to handle Supreme Court cases. In 1930, he was hired as a research fellow at the Royal Frederick University, and earned the dr.juris degree already in 1931, with the thesis Betingelsene for testamenters gyldighet efter norsk rett. He served as a professor from 1933 to 1968. He was dean of the Faculty of Law from 1945 to 1951, and during the same period, he was deputy chairman of the university collegium (board).

During the German occupation of Norway, Arnholm was imprisoned. When the Nazi authorities attempted to change the rules for admission to the university in autumn 1943, a protest ensued. In retaliation, the authorities arrested 11 staff, 60 male students and 10 female students. The staff members, including Johannes Andenæs, Eiliv Skard, Johan Christian Schreiner, Harald Krabbe Schjelderup, Anatol Heintz, Odd Hassel, Ragnar Frisch, Bjørn Føyn, Endre Berner and Carl Jacob Arnholm were sent to Grini concentration camp. Arnholm was first incarcerated at Bredtveit from 15 October to 22 November, then at Berg until 8 December, then at Grini until 5 May 1945. He became a Christian during his time as a prisoner.

Arnholm also served as a "judicial advisor" to the association Norwegian Brewers from 1933 to 1968, and was an Acting Supreme Court Justice in several periods between 1935 and 1939. He was elected as a member of the Norwegian Academy of Science and Letters in 1936, and held honorary degrees at Stockholm College (1957) and the University of Copenhagen (1959). He was appointed as a Commander of the Royal Norwegian Order of St. Olav in 1961, and a Commander of the Order of the Dannebrog and a Commander of the Order of the Polar Star. He died in September 1976 in Oslo.

Academic offices
Preceded by World War II	Dean of the Faculty of Law, University of Oslo; 1945–1951	Succeeded by
