= Oskar Jæger =

Norwegian economist and politician

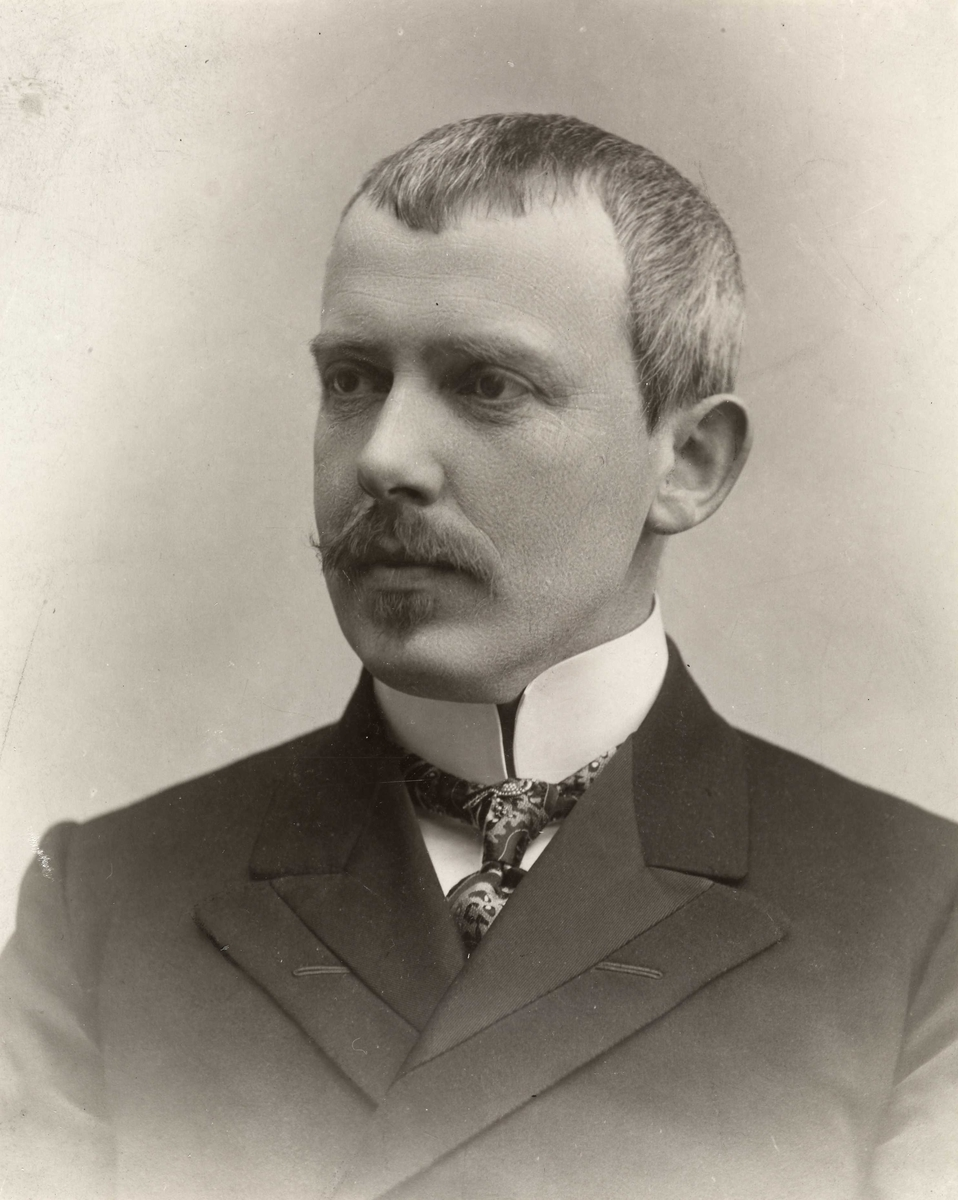
Oskar Gustav Jæger

Oskar Gustav Jæger (16 June 1864 – 19 August 1933) was a Norwegian economist and politician. He obtained the cand.jur. degree in 1897 and was appointed research fellow in national economics in 1898. He was Professor of Economics (1902–1930) at the Faculty of Law of The Royal Frederick University, and served as Dean of the Faculty of Law 1909–1911.

== Life and work ==
He was the son of Nicolai Henrik Jæger (1818–64) and Othilia Henriette Elisabeth Foss (1825–68), and the brother of Hans Jæger. During his university years, Jæger was part of the socialist circle around the magazine Fram and the agitator Olaus Fjørtoft. He also served as president of the Student Society for a time. Unlike his brother, he did not join the Kristiania Bohemians but aligned himself as a liberal member of the Left. In 1909, Jæger joined the Free-minded Liberal Party, siding with the faction that sought to distance itself from the Conservative Party.

In 1893, he earned a doctorate with his dissertation, The Foundation of Modern Political Economy by Adam Smith. Oskar Jæger was a professor of Economics at the University of Oslo, specializing in financial theory, business cycle theory, and other areas of macroeconomics. He was a research fellow from 1898 and a professor from 1902 to 1930. Toward the end of his career, Jæger opposed the dominant academic environment in Oslo as the field of Economics became more radical. Before the so-called Oslo School came to dominate at the University of Oslo, Jæger was regarded as the leading Norwegian authority in macroeconomics and political economy.

Jæger was influenced by the Austrian School, fully endorsing their theories on Capital and Interest and marginal utility. Like his colleague Ragnar Frisch, who was more politically aligned with socialism, Jæger recognized that the state needed to increase spending during economic crises to stimulate production and consumption. However, he was unable to convince the conservative political parties to adopt this approach.

He was the brother of Hans Jæger.

Academic offices
Preceded by	Dean of the Faculty of Law, The Royal Frederick University; 1909–1911	Succeeded by
