= Nordic Journal of Human Rights =

- Discipline: Law, human rights
- Language: English

Publication details
- Former names: Mennesker og Rettigheter, Nordisk tidsskrift for menneskerettigheter
- History: 1982–present
- Publisher: Universitetsforlaget on behalf of the Norwegian Centre for Human Rights (Faculty of Law, University of Oslo) (Norway)

Standard abbreviations
- ISO 4: Nord. J. Hum. Rights

Indexing
- ISSN: 1891-8131 (print); 1891-814X (web)

Links
- Journal homepage

The Nordic Journal of Human Rights is a peer-reviewed academic journal published by the Norwegian Centre for Human Rights (part of the Faculty of Law at the University of Oslo) in collaboration with Universitetsforlaget.

The Journal takes a broad, multi-disciplinary and pluralistic approach to human rights as a legal, political and social practice. Geographically, the Journal takes a global perspective, welcoming submissions on human rights in the Nordic region and beyond. It publishes four issues per year.

In the Norwegian Association of Higher Education Institutions' ranking of scientific journals (Norwegian Scientific Index), the journal is ranked as a Level 2 journal (Level 2 comprises up to the 20% most prestigious journals in any discipline, in this case law).

The journal was established in 1982 and was originally published as a Scandinavian-language journal, titled Mennesker og Rettigheter (Humans and Rights). It was renamed Nordisk tidsskrift for menneskerettigheter (Nordic Journal of Human Rights) in 2004. In 2010, the journal became an English-language journal, and was renamed Nordic Journal of Human Rights.
