= Ellen Holager Andenæs =

Norwegian jurist (born 1947)

Director of the Norwegian Police Surveillance Agency
- In office 1996–1997
- Preceded by: Hans Olav Østgaard
- Succeeded by: Per Sefland

Ellen Aimée Holager Andenæs (born 28 August 1947) is a Norwegian jurist.

She was born in Oslo. She was a junior solicitor in the Norwegian Prosecuting Authority from 1982 to 1983, public prosecutor in Eidsivating Court of Appeal from 1983 to 1987, police inspector in Oslo from 1987 to 1994, and presiding judge in Eidsivating Court of Appeal from 1994. In 1995 the Borgarting Court of Appeal was created, and Andenæs moved there. From 1996 to 1997 she was the acting director of the Norwegian Police Surveillance Agency. Since 1997 she works as a lawyer.

She is married to Mads H. Andenæs, and was a daughter-in-law of Johs Andenæs.

Police appointments
Preceded by Hans Olav Østgaard	Director of the Norwegian Police Surveillance Agency (acting); 1996–1997	Succeeded by Per Sefland
