= Torkel Halvorsen Aschehoug =

Norwegian politician

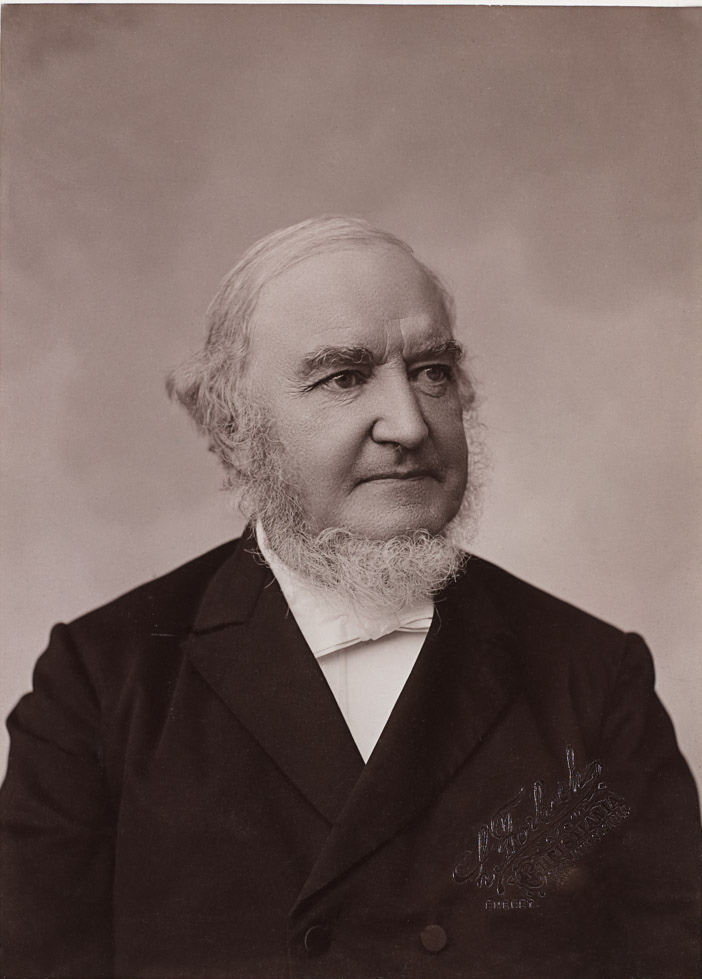
Torkel Halvorsen Aschehoug

Torkel Halvorsen Aschehoug (27 June 1822 – 20 January 1909) was a prominent Norwegian professor, legal scholar, historian and social economist. He also served as a conservative politician and Member of the Norwegian Parliament.

== Biography ==
Torkel Halvorsen Aschehoug was born at Idd (now Halden) in Østfold, Norway. He grew up in a professional family in which his father and grandfather were both parish priests. He attended Fredrikshalds lærde skole in Halden. In 1839, he entered Royal Frederick University (now University of Oslo), where he later became a professor. In 1844, Aschehoug graduated with a law degree. He subsequently studied abroad with stops including England and Sweden.

In 1852, Aschehoug began an over fifty-year career at the University of Oslo. He was Professor of Jurisprudence, National Economics and Statistics at the Faculty of Law (1862–1889), and also served as the Dean of the Faculty of Law and the elected Chairman of the Collegium Academicum (the governing body of the university).

He also served as a Member of Parliament 1868–1892 and played a central role in the controversy surrounding the adoption of a parliamentary system in which the Cabinet was responsible to parliament instead of being merely appointed by the King. In 1883, he founded Statsøkonomisk Forening, an association to advance the study and understanding of socio-economic issues.

His major works include Norges offentlige ret and Norges nuværende statsforfatning.

He was elected as a member of the Royal Swedish Academy of Sciences in 1890 and received the Grand Cross of the Order of St. Olav in 1895. In 1908, he received Norway's highest civilian award, the Borgerdådsmedal in gold.

== Selected Works ==
- Norges offentlige ret (4 volumes, 1866–1885)
  - Part I Statsforfatningen i Norge og Danmark indtil 1814 (Christiania 1866)
  - Part II Norges nuværende Statsforfatning (3 volumes, 1874–1881)
- Den nordiske Statsret (1885)
- Das Staatsrecht der vereinigten Königreiche Schweden und Norwegen (1886)
- Norges nuværende statsforfatning (2nd edition. 3 volumes, 1891–1893)
- De norske Communers Retsforfatning før 1837 (1897)
- Socialøkonomik (3 volumes, 1903–08)

== Personal life ==
Torkel Halvorsen Aschehoug was married twice; 1) Anna Cathrine Marie Aschehoug (1822-1854) 2) Johanne Bolette Aschehoug (1832–1904). He was the father of Halvard Aschehoug (1851-1880), who together with his cousin Hieronymus Aschehoug (1846–1902), co-founder of H. Aschehoug & Co.

== Related Reading ==
- Mathilde C. Fasting (2013) Torkel Aschehoug and Norwegian Historical Economic Thought (Anthem Press) ISBN 9780857280756
