= Sjur Brækhus =

Norwegian legal scholar and judge (1918–2009)

Sjur Brækhus (19 June 1918 – 19 May 2009) was a Norwegian legal scholar and judge.

He was born in Bergen as a son of captain and ship-owner Sigurd Alfred Brækhus (1879–1952) and Hilda Sverresdatter Klingenberg (1884–1957). He finished his secondary education at Frogner School in 1936 and graduated with the cand.jur. degree at the University of Oslo in 1941. He was a deputy judge in Eiker, Modum and Sigdal District Court from 1941 to 1942. He became a research fellow at the University of Oslo in 1945 and took the dr.juris degree in 1947 with the thesis Meglerens rettslige stilling. He was married twice, the first time from 1945 to 1957.

He was hired as a docent at the University of Oslo in 1947, and was promoted to professor already in 1948. He remained here until retirement in 1988. He served as dean from 1963 to 1967. His main field was private law in general, and his main work was Omsetning og kreditt, released in four volumes between 1985 and 1998. Sub-fields of note were maritime law, bankruptcy law and court law. Other well-known books are Norsk tingsrett (1964 with Axel Hærem), Bergning (1968), Konkursrett (1969), and Sjørett, voldgift og lovvalg (1998). He edited the journal Arkiv for Sjørett from 1951 to 1970.

He was also an acting presiding judge in Eidsivating Court of Appeal in 1953 as well as an arbitration court judge. He was a proponent for the Riksmål written form of the Norwegian language, and was a member of the Norwegian Language Council from 1976 to 1991 and the Norwegian Academy for Language and Literature from 1976 to his death.

He was a member of the Norwegian Academy of Science and Letters from 1950 and held honorary degrees at the University of Copenhagen and Stockholm University. He was decorated as a Commander of the Royal Norwegian Order of St. Olav in 1981, a Commander of the Order of the White Rose of Finland in 1990 as well as a Knight of the Order of the Polar Star.

He resided at Stabekk. He died in May 2009. He died on 19 May 2009.

Academic offices
Preceded by Johan Einarsen	Dean of the Faculty of Law, University of Oslo; 1963–1967	Succeeded by Johannes Andenæs
