= Jon Bing =

Norwegian writer and professor of law (1944–2014)

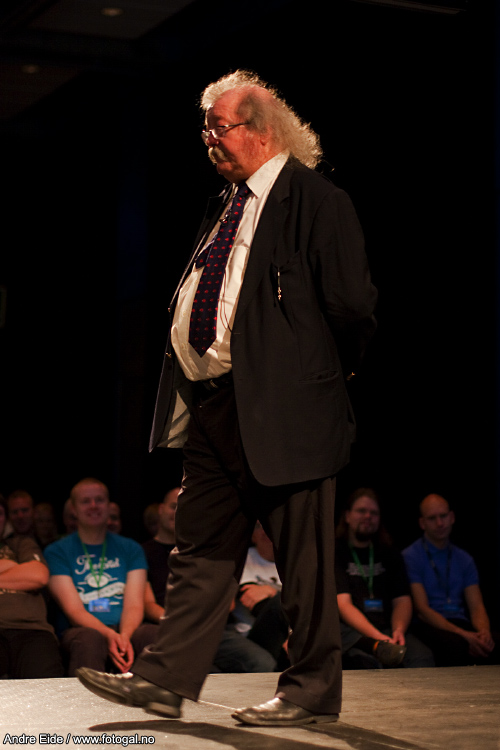
Jon Bing

Jon Bing (30 April 1944 – 14 January 2014) was a Norwegian writer and law professor at the Norwegian Research Center for Computers and Law (NRCCL), and the Faculty of Law at the University of Oslo. Bing was considered a pioneer in international IT and information law. He held honorary doctorates from the Stockholm University and the University of Copenhagen, and was a visiting professor at King's College London. Bing was part of The Protection of Privacy Committee. From 1979 to 1981 he was head of Norsk Filmråd. Between 1981 and 1982, he was the head of The Council of Europe Committee on Legal Data Processing. Between 1993 and 2000, he headed Norsk kulturråd.

== Biography ==
Bing grew up in Trondheim, Norway. After graduating with a degree at Trondheim Cathedral School, Bing began studying at the University of Oslo. Bing was awarded his PhD in law in 1982. Together with Tor Åge Bringsværd and other students at the University of Oslo, Jon Bing started the Aniara society, a club for science fiction fans. He was often profiled in the media around the topic. He published several books, both fiction and non-fiction specialist literature. His first published work was the short story collection Around the sun in a circle (Rundt solen i ring) co-written with Bringsværd, and published in 1967. Bing was a prolific author, and he often collaborated with other authors. He was a member of the Norwegian Academy of Science and Letters.

Bing was engaged with many subjects, especially in the field of technology. He was featured on television on the anniversary of the first Personal Computer in Norway, for example. He was a much-loved public figure, often offering opinions on digital media, copyright, science fiction, etc. He was outspoken about cases concerning ethics in technology, copyright, and the future in general.

He published numerous books, both fiction and non-fiction. His style of writing was calm, and at times dreamy. He wrote about people who stand outside of ordinary society but attempt the impossible. In the short story Riestopher Josef from Around the Sun in a Circle he wrote about a boy who can't leave his house due to skin disease. The short story is about Riestopher who builds himself a spaceship and goes to the sun to capture a sunbeam.

His first drama was staged at Det Norske Teatret in 1971. In 1975 he received the Dammprisen and the Ministry of Culture's award for best youth book for Azur - Planet of the Captains (Azur – kapteinens planet) and in 1979 he received The International Board on Books for the Young People Award, and the Ministry of Culture's award for best translation of children's book. Bing and Bringsværd received the Rivertonprisen, given annually to the best work of Norwegian crime fiction, in 1979 for the television series Marco Polo (Blindpassasjer) and the 1980 Ministry of Culture's award for best comic story.

He died at the age of 69 in 2014.

== Bibliography ==
=== Fiction ===
- 1967 – Around the sun in a circle (short stories, with Tor Åge Bringsværd)
- 1969 – Komplex (short stories)
- 1969 – To lose a spaceship: a game of chance (play)(with Tor Åge Bringsværd)
- 1969 – Lunarium: the book of the moon (with Tor Åge Bringsværd)
- 1970 – The soft landscape (novel)
- 1970 – Red planet (science fiction anthology) (with Tor Åge Bringsværd)
- 1972 – Sesam 71 (short stories) (with Tor Åge Bringsværd)
- 1972 – East of the sun" and "West of the moon (science fiction anthologies) (with Tor Åge Bringsværd)
- 1972 – Scenario (novel)
- 1972 – Electrical Fairytales (editor, short stories for children) (with Tor Åge Bringsværd)
- 1973 – Me - a machine: cybernetic fables (short stories) (with Tor Åge Bringsværd)
- 1974 – Knotted Writing (short stories)
- 1975 – Azur - Planet of the Captains (children's book, first volume in The Chronicles of the Starship Alexandria)
- 1976 – Zalt - Planet of the Steamlords (children's book, second volume in The Chronicles of the Starship Alexandria)
- 1976 – The Mad Professor (short stories) (with Tor Åge Bringsværd)
- 1977 – Backwash: a science fiction anthology (with Tor Åge Bringsværd)
- 1980 – The new adventures of Marco Polo (plays, with Tor Åge Bringsværd, later adapted to a three-part television series on NRK)
- 1980 – Shooting Stars (science fiction anthology) (with Tor Åge Bringsværd)
- 1982 – Mizt - Planet of the Ghosts (children's book, third volume in The Chronicles of the Starship Alexandria)
- 1984 – Flood (children's book)
- 1984 – Doppelgangers (novel)
- 1984 – The book is dead! Long live the book! (essays)
- 1985 – Tanz - Planet of Riddles (children's book, fourth and final volume The Chronicles of the Starship Alexandria)
- 1986 – Hvadata? Pieces of literature for the information society (short story)
- 1988 – As sure as data (short stories)
- 1988 – Shadows of the moon (children's book)
- 1988 – Dust to dust (play) (with Tor Åge Bringsværd)
- 1991 – Cases of Doubt (short stories) (with Tor Åge Bringsværd)
- 1992 – The accounts of an old astronaut (novel)
- 1992 – Rosenvy and the corporation who knew too much (crime)
- 1995 – The girl that went missing (children's book)
- 2004 – Oslo 2084: four fables of future crimes (short stories) (with Tor Åge Bringsværd)
