= Frederik Peter Brandt =

Norwegian jurist, legal historian and professor

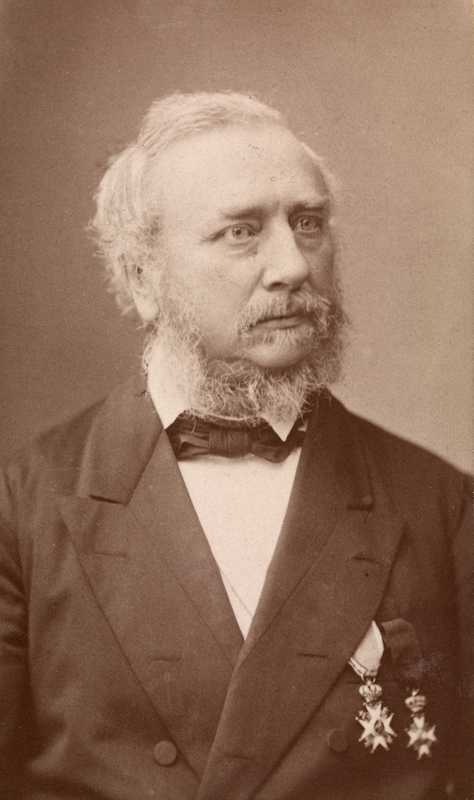
Frederik Peter Brandt

Frederik Peter Brandt (24 July 1825 – 2 May 1891) was a Norwegian jurist, legal historian and professor at the Faculty of Law of the Royal Frederick University (1866–1890).

== Biography ==
Frederik Peter Brandt was born in Åmli in Nedenes county, Norway. He enrolled at Royal Frederick University (now University of Oslo) in 1842, receiving his cand.jur. in 1846. He became a university research fellow in 1849. In 1851, he was awarded the Crown Prince's gold medal (Kronprinsens gullmedalje) for his thesis regarding changes in Norwegian judicial institutions. He became an associate professor at the Faculty of Law in 1862 and professor in History of Law in 1866. He also served as Dean of the Faculty of Law.

Brandt was a member of the city council in Kristiania (now Oslo) from 1863-76. From 1872, he was an extraordinary judge with the Supreme Court of Norway.

== Awards ==
- 1868 - Order of the Polar Star
- 1873 - Order of St. Olav

== Selected works ==
- Om Odels- og aasædesretten (1850)
- Visebog for norske Selskabskredse. Indeholdende 550 Sange (1850)
- Fremstilling af Lovgivningen om Thinglysningsvæsenet (1851)
- Samling af mærkelige Højesteretsdomme i Tidsrummet 1815-1835 (1855)
- Fremstilling af de Forandringer, som Norges dømmende Institusjoner i ældre Tider have undergaaet (1856)
- Repertorium for praktisk lovkyndighed (1855–63)
- Om foreløbige retsmidler i den gamle norske rettergang: prøveforelæsning (1862)
- Tingsretten fremstillet efter den norske Lovgivning (1867)
- Trællenes Retsstilling efter Norges gamle Love (1870)
- Om Søforsikring: et Tillæg til Søretten (1876)
- Om vasdragenes benyttelse (1878)
- Tingsretten, fremstillet efter den norske lovgivning (2nd ed, 1878)
- Forelæsninger over den norske retshistorie (1880–83)
- Grunnloven. Kongeriget Norges Grundlov og Valglov med deres Tillæg og Ændringer (1884)

Academic offices
Preceded by	Dean of the Faculty of Law, The Royal Frederick University	Succeeded by
