= Johan Einarsen =

Norwegian jurist and economist

Johan Einarsen (30 August 1903 – 1980) was a Norwegian jurist and economist.

He was born in Bergen as a son of jurist and economist Einar Einarsen (1868–1913) and Emilie Wiborg (1868–1953). He finished his secondary degree in 1924, obtained the cand.oecon. degree in 1927 and the cand.jur. degree in 1930, both at the Royal Frederick University's Faculty of Law. He was hired at the Royal Frederick University in 1932, and worked there until 1936 while also being a teacher at Oslo Commerce School from 1934 to 1938. In 1936–37 he had a hiatus to study in the United States. He took the dr.philos. degree in 1939 with a doctoral dissertation titled Reinvestment cycles and their manifestation in the Norwegian shipping industry. It was inspired by econometry.

He was a docent in economics and agricultural law at the Norwegian College of Agriculture from 1938 to 1947. During the occupation of Norway by Nazi Germany he was imprisoned in Grini concentration camp on 29 July 1942, and held there until the war's end. In 1947 he married Thyra Marie Pedersen, a shipmaster's daughter from Tromøya.

In 1947, he was appointed Professor of Economics at the Faculty of Law, University of Oslo, where he also served as dean until 1963. When the field of economics was moved from the Faculty of Law to the new Faculty of Social Sciences, he became a professor at the new Department of Economics there. He retired in 1972. He was a member of several government commissions. He was also a fellow of the Norwegian Academy of Science and Letters from 1948.

Academic offices
| Preceded by | Dean of the Faculty of Law, University of Oslo –1963 | Succeeded by Sjur Brækhus |
