= Anders Bratholm =

Anders Bratholm (7 January 1920 – 8 July 2010) was a Norwegian professor and legal scholar.

== Biography ==
Bratholm was born in Kristiania (now Oslo), Norway. His parents were Johan Bernhard Bratholm (1893–1967) and Petra Marie Ratvik (1895–1971). He took his doctorate degree in 1958. After graduation, he was a judge prior to becoming a fellow student at the University of Oslo. He was a professor of jurisprudence at the University of Oslo from 1960, a position he held until his retirement in 1990. His legal field was primarily criminal law which he taught at the university.

He published Pågripelse og varetektsfengsel (1957) and numerous other books. He was editor-in-chief of the newspaper Dagningen from 1945 until 1947, and of the journal Lov og Rett from 1962 until 1990. He was a member of the World Peace Foundation (Stiftelsen Fred) 1986-92 and member of the Norwegian Helsinki Committee 1990–92.

He was a member of the Norwegian Academy of Science and Letters since 1963, and was decorated as a Knight, First Class of the Order of St. Olav. He was awarded the Fritt Ord Award in 1986. He resided at Hosle and died at Bærum in 2010.
