= Mads H. Andenæs =

Norwegian legal academic (1940–2019)

Mads Henry Andenæs (22 April 1940 – 12 May 2019) was a Norwegian legal academic.

He was born in Oslo as a son of Johs. Andenæs. He took the dr.juris degree in 1978 on the thesis Sameier og selskaper, and was appointed as a professor at the University of Oslo in 1986. Other publications include Aksjeselskapsrett (2nd ed. 1992), Konkurs (2nd ed. 1999), Rettskildelære (1997) og Aksjeselskaper & allmennaksjeselskaper (1998).

He was married to Ellen Holager Andenæs. In his youth he was a javelin thrower, with a personal best throw of 73.12 metres at Bislett stadion in 1960. He represented the club IK Tjalve, having represented St. Hanshaugens IF as a teenager. He died in his home, aged 79.
