= Birger Stuevold Lassen =

Norwegian legal scholar (1927–2011)

Birger Stuevold Lassen (19 August 1927 – 15 December 2011) was a Norwegian jurist, legal scholar and expert on intellectual property law.

== Biography ==
He was born in Molde in Møre og Romsdal county, Norway. He grew up in Romsdal, where his father Odd Lassen was a lawyer. He obtained the examen artium in 1946. After completing Officer Cadet School, he went on to study law, obtaining the cand.jur. degree in 1954. He was an assistant judge in Stavanger, before he was appointed research fellow at the University of Oslo in 1957. He was appointed lecturer in 1961, senior lecturer in 1971 and professor in 1990. He was editor-in-chief of Tidsskrift for Rettsvitenskap 1974–1999 and served as editor of Norges Lover which was published by the Faculty of Law at the University of Oslo. He was also acting Supreme Court Justice in the Supreme Court of Norway.

He was a member of the Norwegian Academy of Science and Letters and in 1992 received an honorary doctorate at Stockholm University.
