= Odd Hassel =

Norwegian physical chemist and Nobel Laureate (1897–1981)

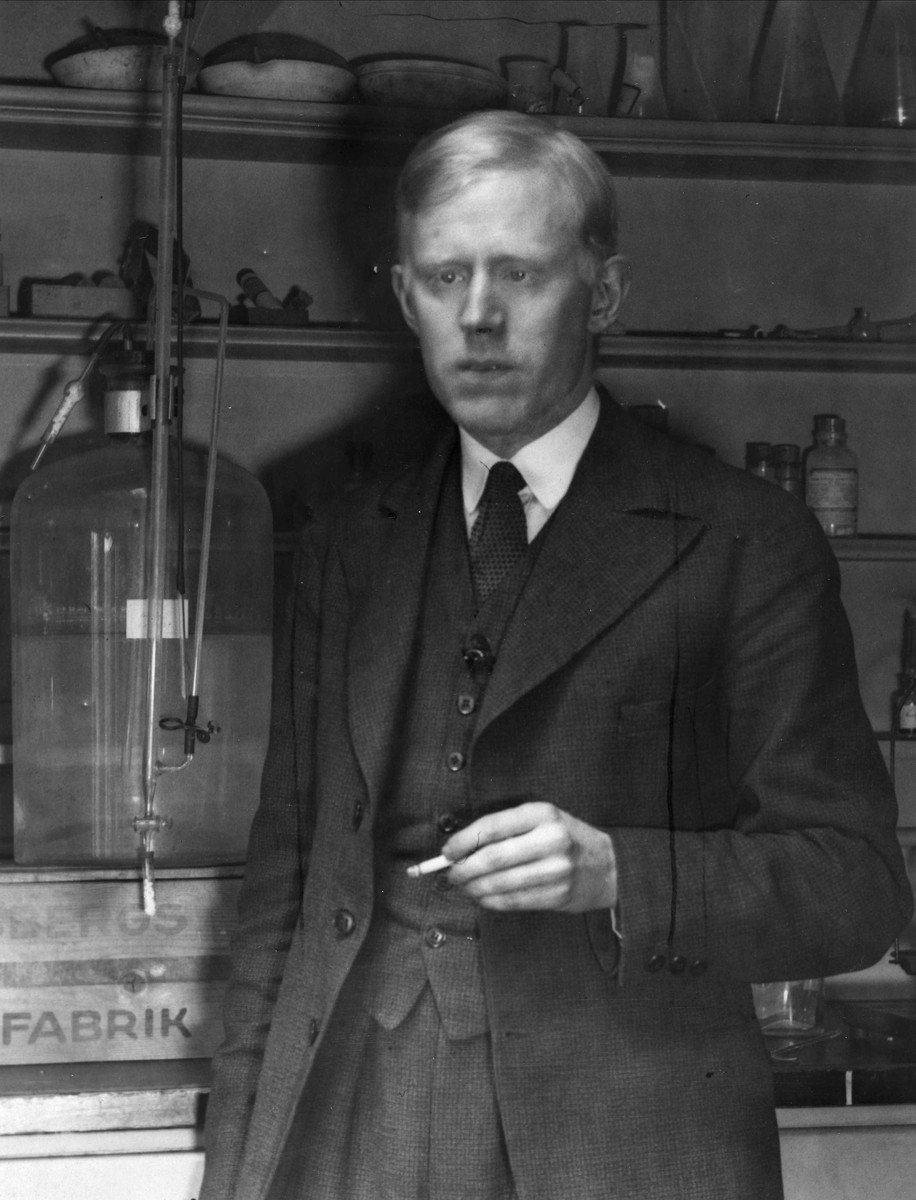
- Odd Hassel, c.1935
- Born: 17 May 1897; Kristiania, Norway
- Died: 11 May 1981 (aged 83); Oslo, Norway
- Education: University of Oslo
- Awards: Nobel Prize in Chemistry (1969)
- Scientific career
- Fields: Physical chemistry
- Workplaces: University of Oslo; University of Berlin

Odd Hassel (17 May 1897 – 11 May 1981) was a Norwegian physical chemist and Nobel Laureate. His major focus was on problems related to molecular structure (notably the cyclohexane molecule and its derivatives), and his research helped contribute to the development of the concept of conformation and its application in chemistry.

== Biography ==
Hassel was born in Kristiania (now Oslo), Norway. His parents were Ernst Hassel (1848–1905), a gynaecologist, and Mathilde Klaveness (1860–1955). In 1915, he entered the University of Oslo where he studied mathematics, physics and chemistry, and graduated in 1920. Victor Goldschmidt was Hassel's tutor when he began studies in Oslo, while Heinrich Jacob Goldschmidt, Victor's father, was Hassel's thesis advisor. Father and son were important figures in Hassel's life and they remained friends. After taking a year off from studying, he went to Munich, Germany to work in the laboratory of Professor Kasimir Fajans.

His work there led to the detection of absorption indicators. After moving to Berlin, he worked at the Kaiser Wilhelm Institute, where he began to do research on X-ray crystallography. He furthered his research with a Rockefeller Fellowship, obtained with the help of Fritz Haber. In 1924, he obtained his PhD from Humboldt University of Berlin, before moving to his alma mater, the University of Oslo, where he worked from 1925 through 1964. He became a professor in 1934.

His work was interrupted in October, 1943 when he and other university staff members were arrested by the Nasjonal Samling and handed over to the occupation authorities. He spent time in several detention camps, until he was released in November, 1944.

== Work ==
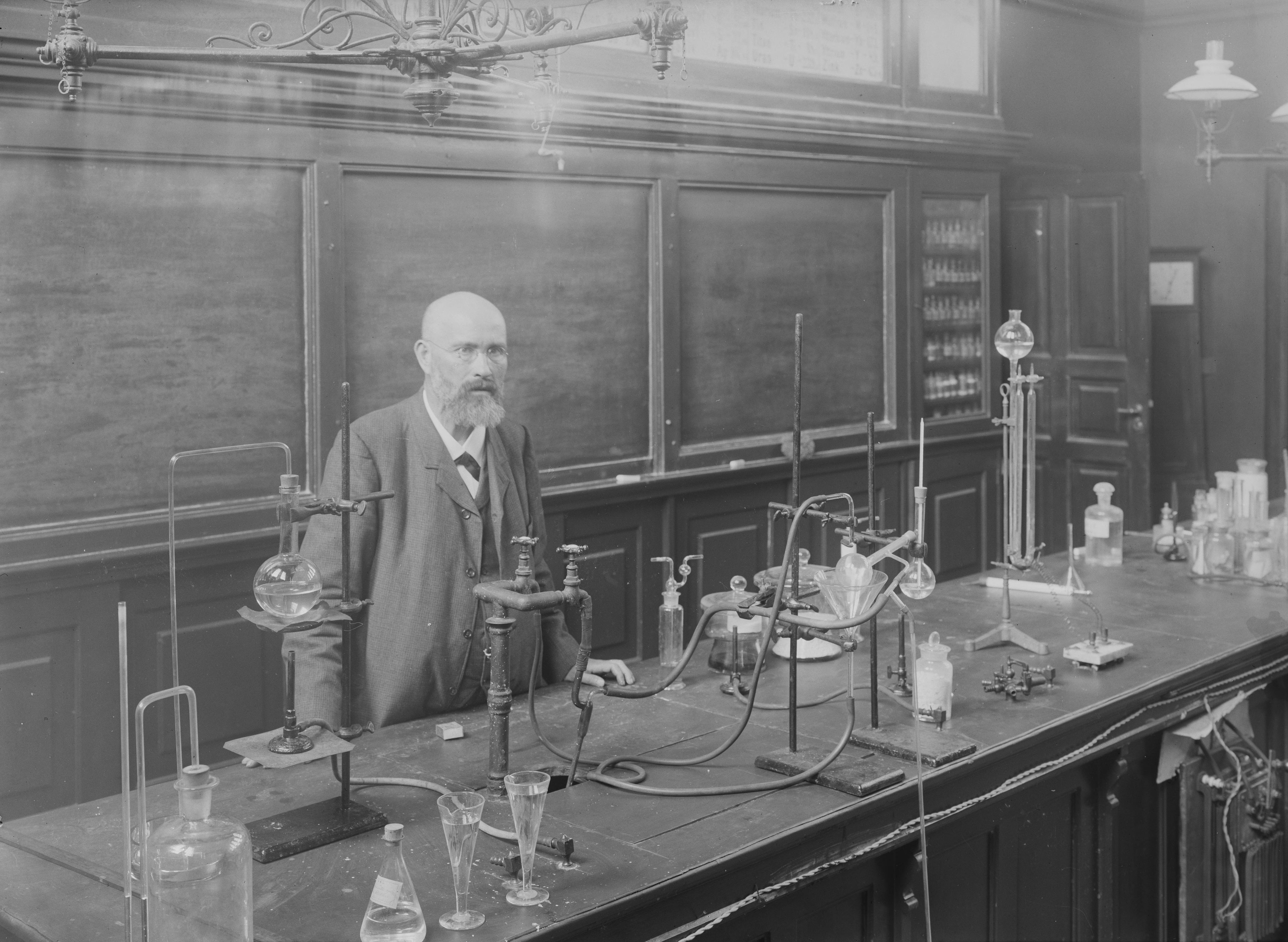
Heinrich Jacob Goldschmidt was Hassel's thesis advisor and father of Victor Goldschmidt. Credit: Narve Skarpmoen, 1916

.

Hassel originally focused on inorganic chemistry, but beginning in 1930 his work concentrated on problems connected with molecular structure, particularly the structure of cyclohexane and its derivatives. He introduced the Norwegian scientific community to the concepts of the electric dipole moments and electron diffraction. The work for which he is best known established the three-dimensionality of molecular geometry. He focused his research on ring-shaped carbon molecules, which he suspected filled three dimensions instead of two, the common belief of the time. By using the number of bonds between the carbon and hydrogen atoms, Hassel demonstrated the impossibility of the molecules existing on only one plane. This discovery led to him being awarded the Nobel Prize in Chemistry for 1969.

== Honors ==
Hassel was awarded the Nobel Prize in Chemistry in 1969, shared with English chemist Derek Barton.

He received the Guldberg-Waage Medal (Guldberg-Waage Medal) from the Norwegian Chemical Society and the Gunnerus Medal from the Royal Norwegian Society of Science and Letters, both in 1964.

Hassel held honorary degrees from the University of Copenhagen (1950) and Stockholm University (1960). An annual lecture named in his honor is given at the University of Oslo.

He was an honorary Fellow of the Norwegian Chemical Society, Chemical Society of London, Norwegian Academy of Science and Letters, Royal Danish Academy of Sciences and Letters and Royal Swedish Academy of Sciences.

He was made a Knight of the Order of St. Olav in 1960.

== See also ==
- Cyclohexane conformation
- Halogen bond

== Related reading ==
- Oakes, E. (2002). A to Z of Chemists. Facts on File Science library : Notable scientists. New York: VB Hermitage. ISBN 978-0-8160-4579-2.
- Laylin, James K. (1993) Nobel Laureates in Chemistry, 1901-1992 (Chemical Heritage Foundation) ISBN 9780841226906
