= 1950 in Norway =

- Centuries: 18th; 19th; 20th; 21st
- Decades: 1930s; 1940s; 1950s; 1960s; 1970s
- See also: List of years in Norway

Events in the year 1950 in Norway.

== Incumbents ==
- Monarch – Haakon VII.
- Prime Minister – Einar Gerhardsen (Labour Party)

== Events ==
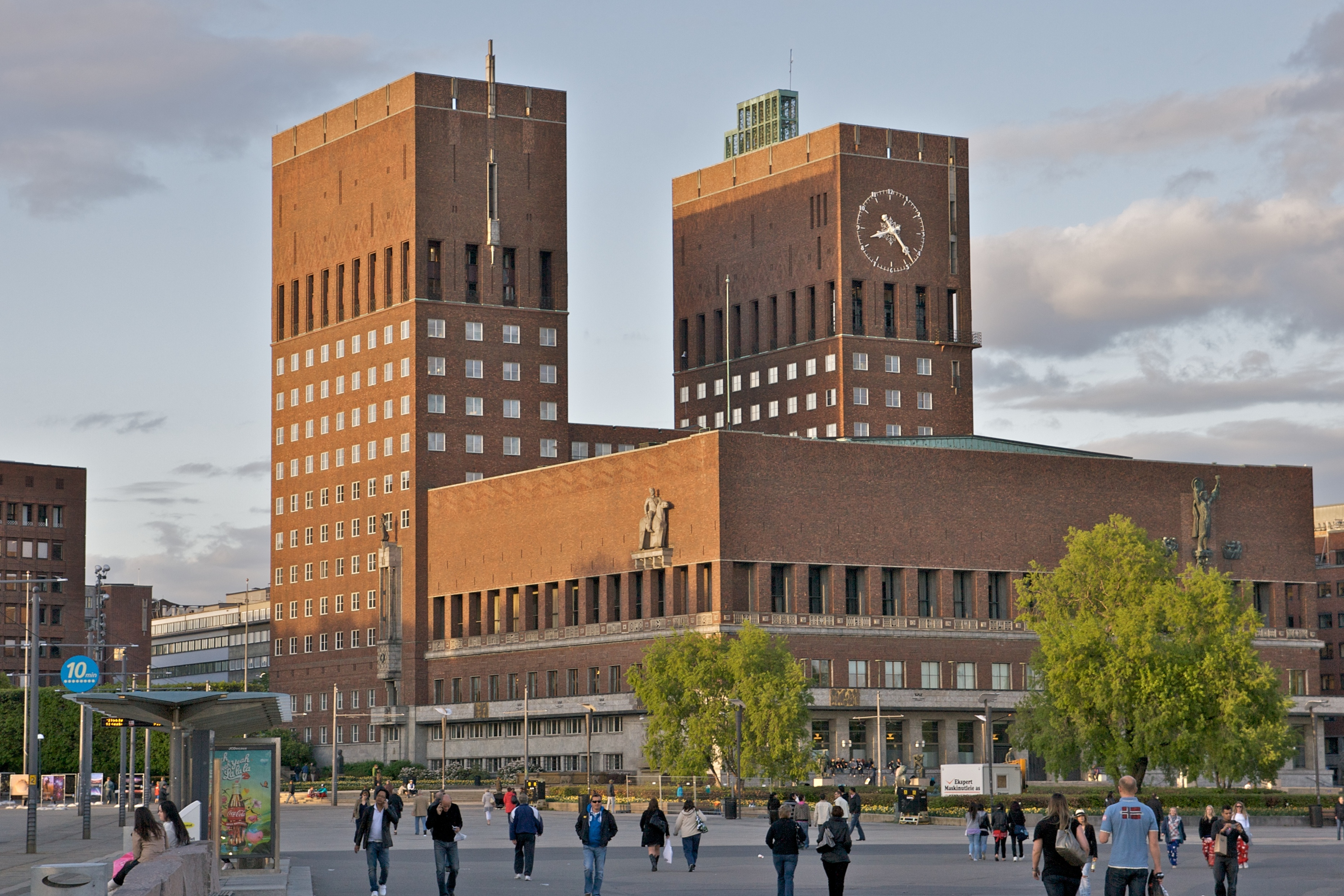
The official inauguration of the Oslo City Hall

- 2 January – Postbanken (lit. The Post Bank) starts its operations.
- 15 November – 14 people killed in the Hjuksebø train disaster.
- 1 December – Population Census: 3,278,546 inhabitants in Norway.
- The official inauguration of the Oslo City Hall.
- Since joining NATO on April 4, 1949, in the year 1950 Norway continued its integration into the joint defense structure of the organization.

== Popular culture ==
=== Literature ===
- September 18 – Henrik Rytter, Norwegian dramatist, lyricist and translator (born 1887)

== Notable births ==
=== January ===
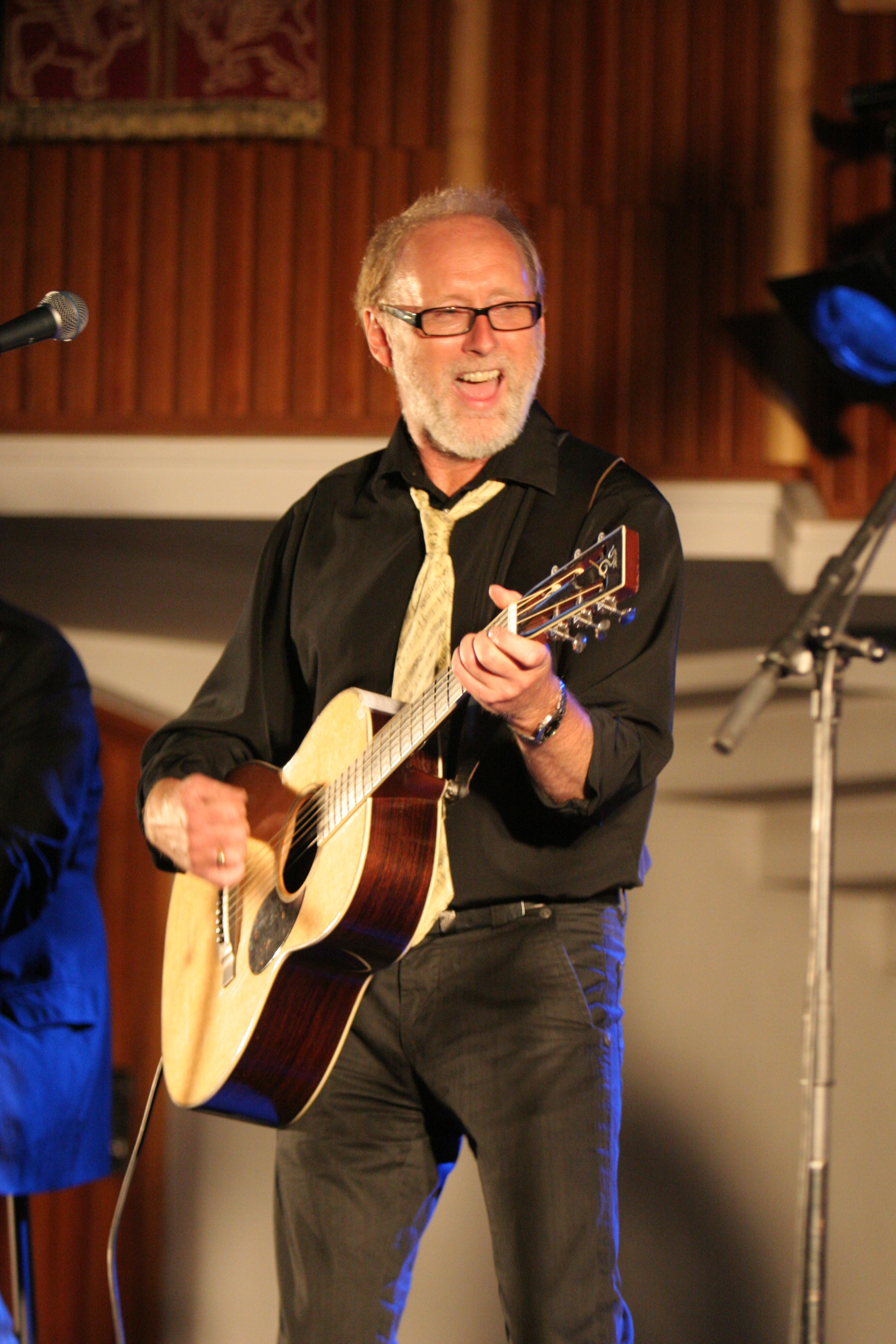
Halvdan Sivertsen

- 5 January – Halvdan Sivertsen, singer
- 9 January – Maryon Eilertsen, actress and theatre director (died 2015).
- 22 January – Tomm Kristiansen, author and journalist (died 2022)
- 24 January – Gustav Hareide, politician
- 25 January – Svein Gjedrem, economist, Governor of the Central Bank of Norway
- 28 January – Gro Anita Schønn, singer (died 2001).

=== February ===
- 21 February – Oddmund Hagen, poet, novelist, children's writer, and literary critic.
- 21 February – Alf Reidar Jacobsen, writer.
- 24 February – Torill Eide, children's writer.
- 28 February – Willy Olsen, speed skater.

=== March ===
- 7 March – Eva M. Nielsen, politician
- 11 March – Ketil Egge, actor and theatre director (died 1997).
- 17 March – Tor-Aksel Busch, lawyer, Director of Public Prosecutions.

=== April ===
- 11 April – Audun Sjøstrand, crime fiction writer.
- 20 April – Inger Elisabeth Hansen, poet and translator.
- 23 April – Tom Røymark, ice hockey player.
- 28 April – Martin Asphaug, film director and screenwriter

=== May ===
- 3 May – Morten Krogvold, photographer
- 6 May – Sigurd Hille, politician.
- 6 May – Roy Jansen, ice hockey player.
- 7 May – Kjell Torriset, painter and graphic artist.
- 11 May – Jan Erik Langangen, businessperson
- 24 May – Sissel Rønbeck, politician
- 28 May – Anne Margrethe Larsen, politician

=== June ===
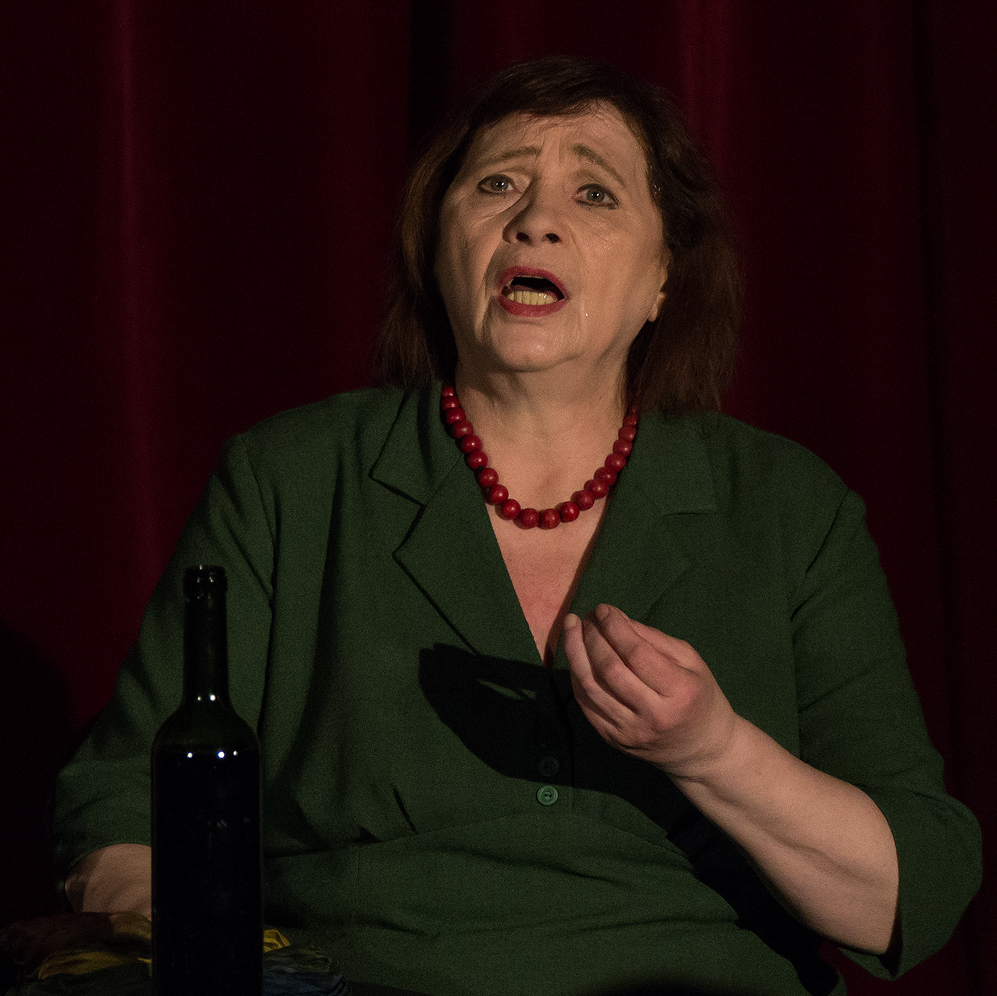
Wenche Kvamme

- 10 June – Mimmi Bæivi, politician
- 11 June – Kristin Bølgen Bronebakk, civil servant
- 15 June – Tom Lotherington, writer and translator (died 2026).
- 19 June – Wenche Kvamme, singer and actress (died 2019).
- 30 June - Jan Petter Collier, stockbroker.

=== July ===
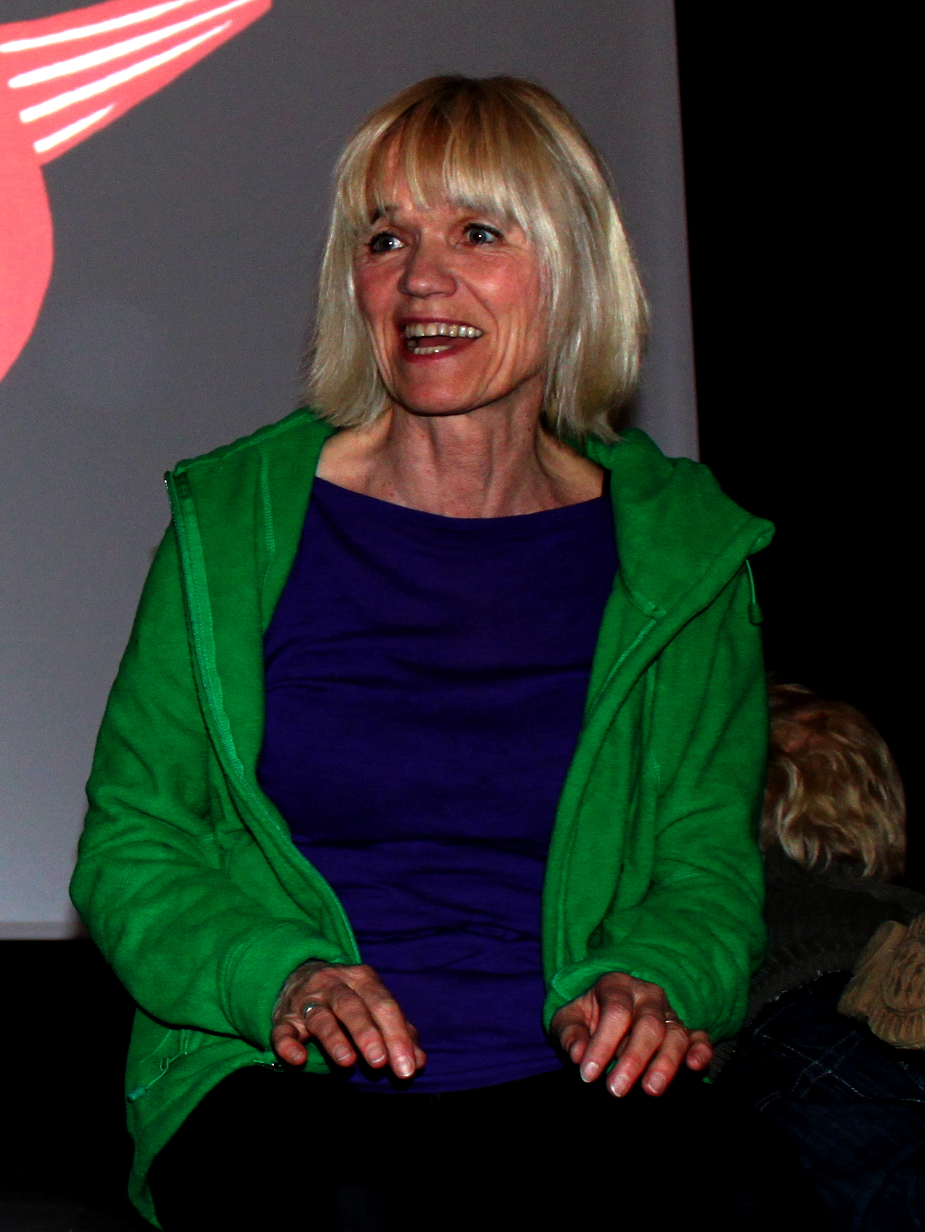
Iben Sandemose

- 7 July – Sverre Rødahl, theatre director.
- 13 July – Iben Sandemose, illustrator, children's writer, playwright and biographer.
- 22 July – Elisabeth Eide, journalist, teacher, novelist and non-fiction writer.

=== August ===
- 2 August – Hermann Starheimsæter, poet and novelist.
- 4 August – Inga Magistad, diplomat
- 8 August – Synne Skouen, composer
- 19 August – Kari Bøge, Swedish-born Norwegian poet, novelist, short story writer, children's writer and illustrator.
- 25 August 1950 – Karen-Marie Ellefsen, journalist and sports reporter.

=== September ===
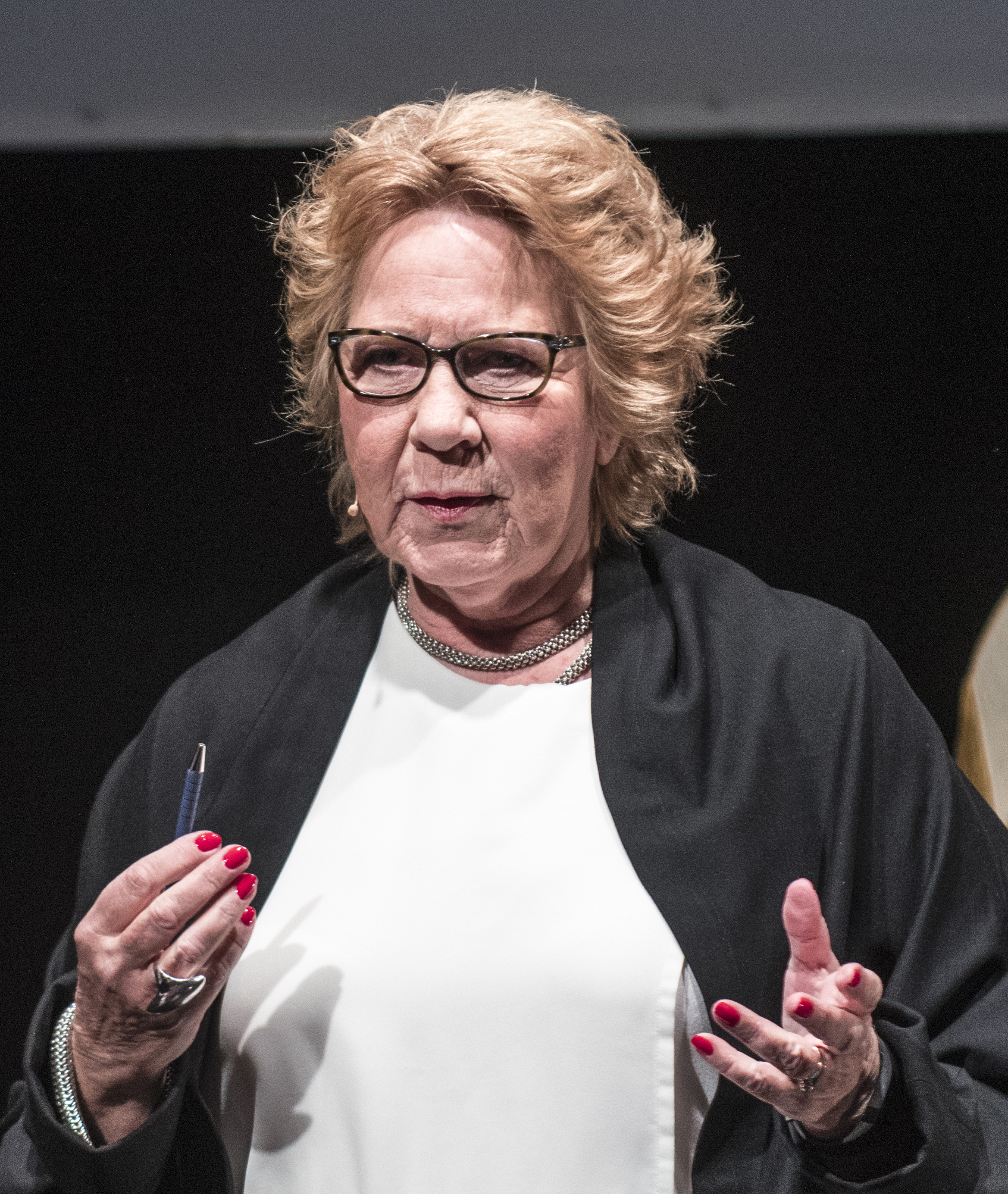
Anne Grosvold

- 5 September – Bjørn Skagestad, actor
- 5 September – Kari Svendsen, singer, banjo player and revue artist.
- 7 September – Kjell Aamot, business executive.
- 7 September – Anne Grosvold, journalist.
- 10 September – Tom Lund, football player
- 26 September – Ida Børresen, civil servant.

=== October ===
- 1 October – Sigbjørn Johnsen, politician
- 11 October – Helga Gunerius Eriksen, writer.
- 12 Oktober – Morten Borgersen, theatre director.
- 12 October – Knut Knudsen, racing cyclist
- 28 October – Beate Ellingsen, designer.

=== November ===
- 5 November – Thorbjørn Jagland, politician
- 5 December – Berit Brørby, politician

=== December ===
- 21 December – Lillebjørn Nilsen, singer-songwriter (died 2024).

== Notable deaths ==
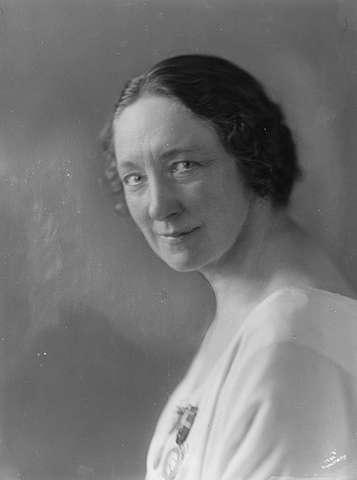
Johanne Dybwad

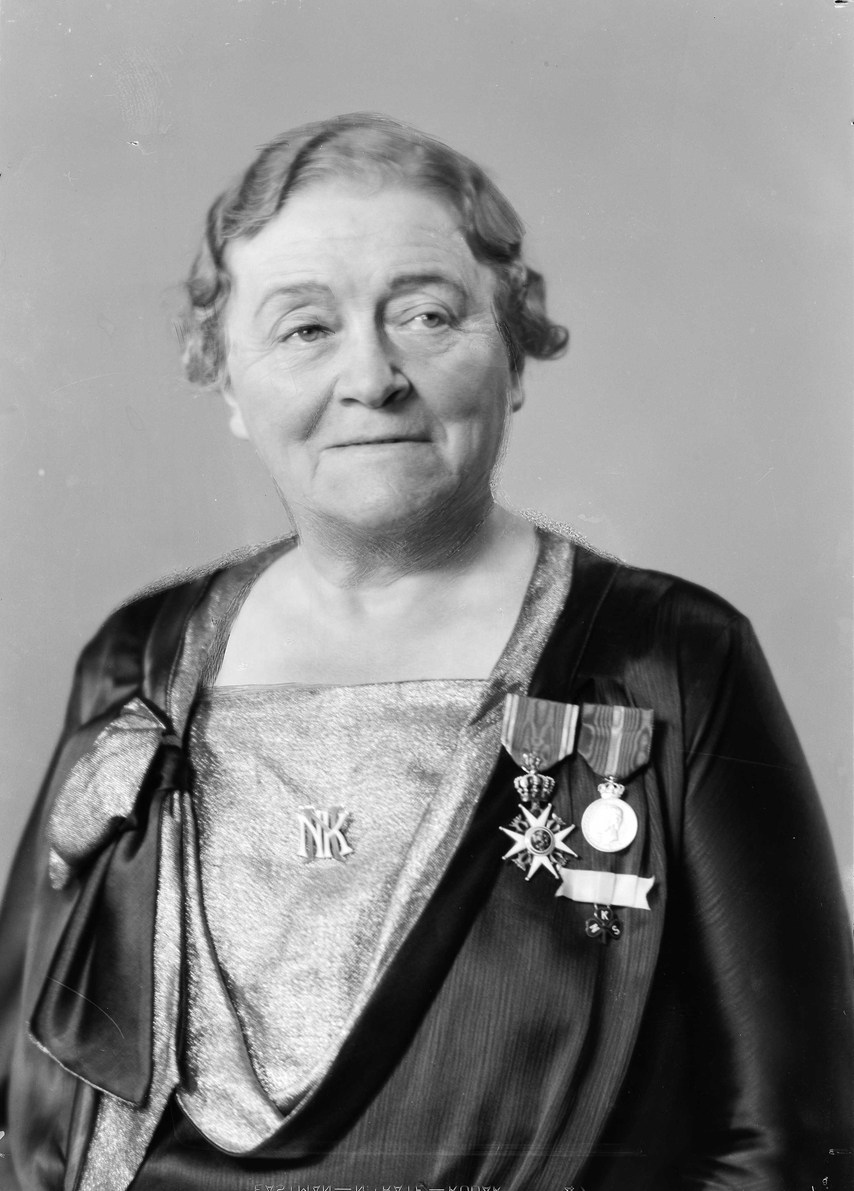
Betzy Kjelsberg

- 9 January – Elise Sem, barrister (born 1870)
- 20 January – Sofie Schjøtt, jurist (born 1871).
- 30 January – Sigurd Eldegard, actor and playwright (born 1866).
- 22 February – Halvor Møgster, Olympic sailor (born 1875)
- 23 February – Cally Monrad, singer and actress (born 1879).
- 11 February – Anders Sandvig, dentist and ethnologist (born 1862)
- 4 March – Johanne Dybwad, actress and stage producer (born 1867).
- 16 March – Vilhelm Dybwad, songswriter, barrister and writer of comedies and revues (born 1863)
- 5 April – William Farre (71), composer.
- 6 April – Signe Lund (81), composer.
- 27 May – Gunvald Aus, engineer (born 1851)
- 10 June – Karen Platou, politician (born 1879)
- 20 June – Otto Valstad, educator, painter, book illustrator and children's writer (born 1862).
- 26 June – Hans Jørgen Darre-Jenssen, engineer and politician (born 1864)
- 27 July – Marta Steinsvik, author and translator (born 1877)
- 3 August – Kristian Laake, Commanding General of the Norwegian Army (born 1875)
- 6 September – Egil Sundt, civil servant (born 1903).
- 10 September – Alfred Larsen, Olympic sailor (born 1863).
- 14 September – Marius Eriksen, Olympic gymnast (born 1886).
- 17 September – Halfdan Christensen, actor and theatre director (born 1873).
- 3 October – Betzy Kjelsberg, politician and feminist (born 1866)
- 22 December – Bernhoff Hansen, wrestler and Olympic gold medallist (born 1877)
