= 2019 in Norway =

- Centuries: 19th; 20th; 21st
- Decades: 1990s; 2000s; 2010s; 2020s
- See also: List of years in Norway

Events in the year 2019 in Norway.

== Incumbents ==
- Monarch – Harald V.
- Prime Minister – Erna Solberg (Conservative).

== Events ==
- 22 January – the Christian Democratic Party entered Solberg's Cabinet.
- 23 March – A cruise ship with engine problems sent a mayday call off Norway's western coast as it desperately tried to avoid being grounded on the rocky coast. Rescue workers then launched a high-risk evacuation of the ship's 1,300 passengers and crew, winching them one-by-one up to helicopters as heaving waves tossed the ship from side to side.
- 30 July – several landslides in Jølster Municipality blocked the European route E39.
- 10 August – 21-year-old Philip Manshaus perpetrated and was arrested for attacking Al-Noor Islamic Centre in Bærum Municipality. The shooting is being investigated as a possible act of terrorism.
- 24 August – Over 200 reindeer found dead in Svalbard; believed to be victims of climate change.
- 31 August – Confirmation of Princess Ingrid Alexandra took place in Skaugum.
- 31 August – A sightseeing helicopter crashed in the mountains of Skoddevarre in Alta Municipality, killing all 6 occupants.
- 28 October – A social security case came to light after it is found that the NAV found at least 48 people guilty of supposed social security fraud. Evidence suggests that this misinterpretation of EEA rules by both NAV and the government goes back until at least 2012.
- 8 November – Exactly one year after its accident, the investigation report for KNM Helge Ingstad is publicised. The Norwegian Navy face harsh criticism for their role in the accident, with minor criticism pointed at the tanker involved in the collision.
- 15 November – Frode Berg was released from the custody of Russia, having suspected Berg of espionage. Berg was exchanged with prisoners of Lithuania and subsequently returned to Norway.
- 11 December – Ja, vi elsker, composed by Rikard Nordraak, with lyrics by Bjørnstjerne Bjørnson, became the official Norwegian national anthem, having been the unofficial anthem for years.

=== Sports ===
- 9 February – Aksel Lund Svindal raced for the last time in alpine skiing, finishing with a silver medal at the World Championships.
- 9 March – Magnus Moan raced for the last time in Nordic combined skiing.
- 30 May – Erling Haaland scored 9 goals in one match at the 2019 FIFA U-20 World Cup, breaking the U-20 World Cup record and also winning the tournament's Golden Boot.
- 9–11 August – 2019 European Team Championships, First League were held in Sandnes Municipality.
- 17 September – Erling Haaland scored 3 goals in his debut match in the UEFA Champions League (group stage).

=== Anniversaries ===
- 11 April – 150 years since the birth of Gustav Vigeland.
- 150 years since the Parliament of Norway convened every year.
- 100 years since the introduction of proportional representation in plural-member constituencies in parliamentary elections (effective from 1921)

== Deaths ==
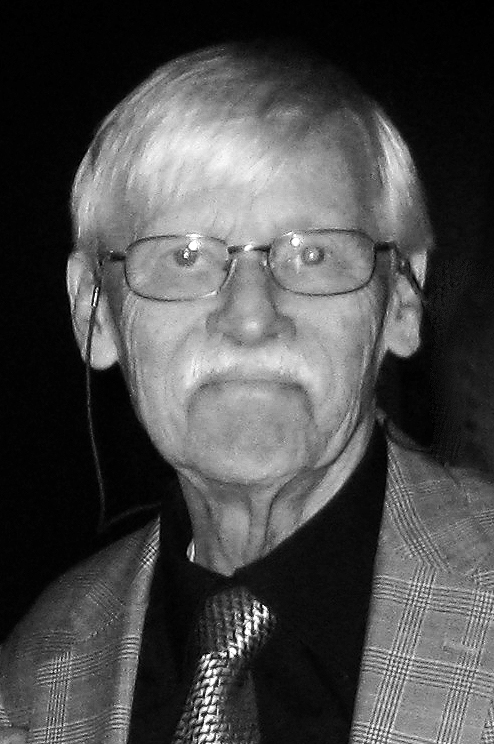
Dagfinn Bakke

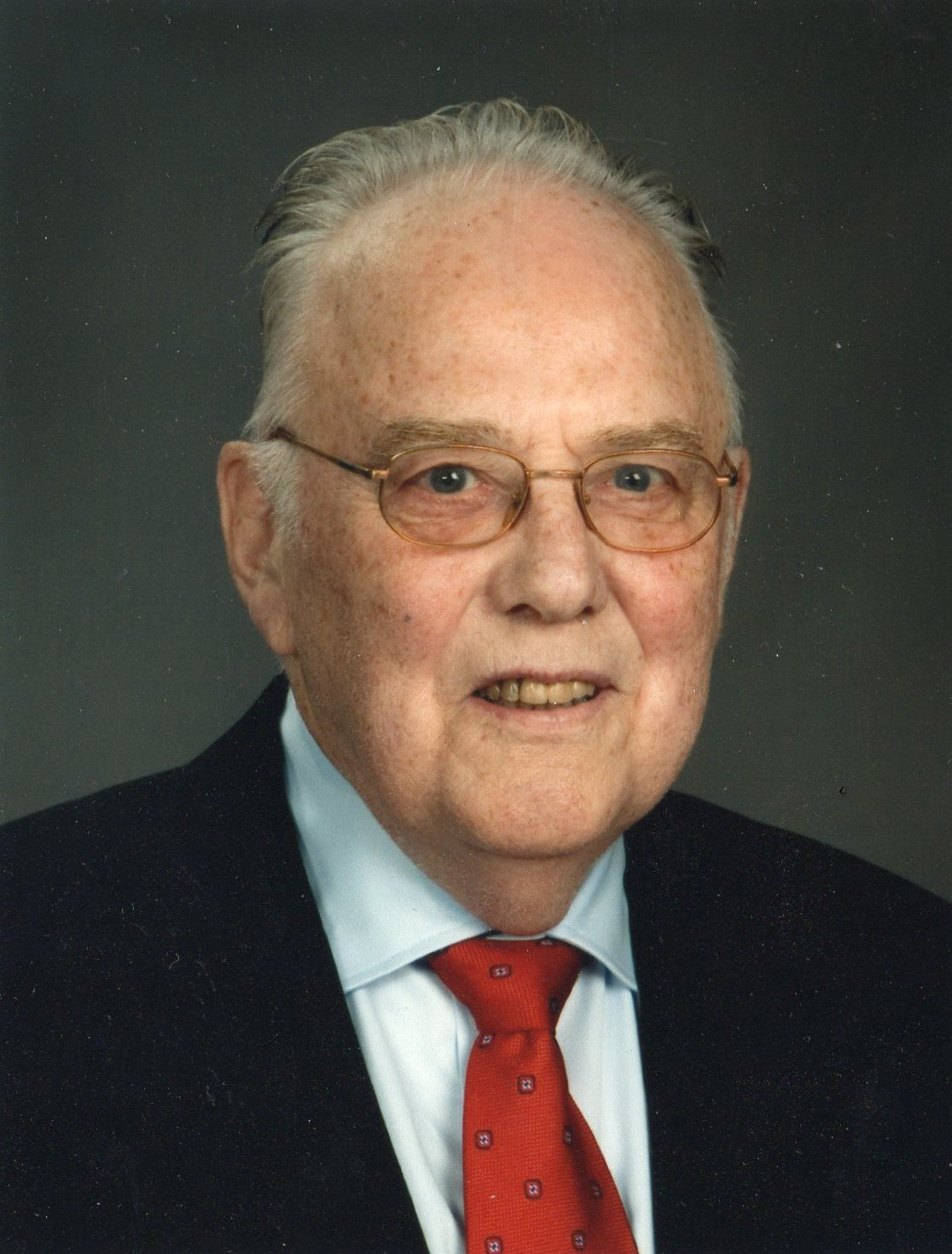
Ove Kristian Sundberg

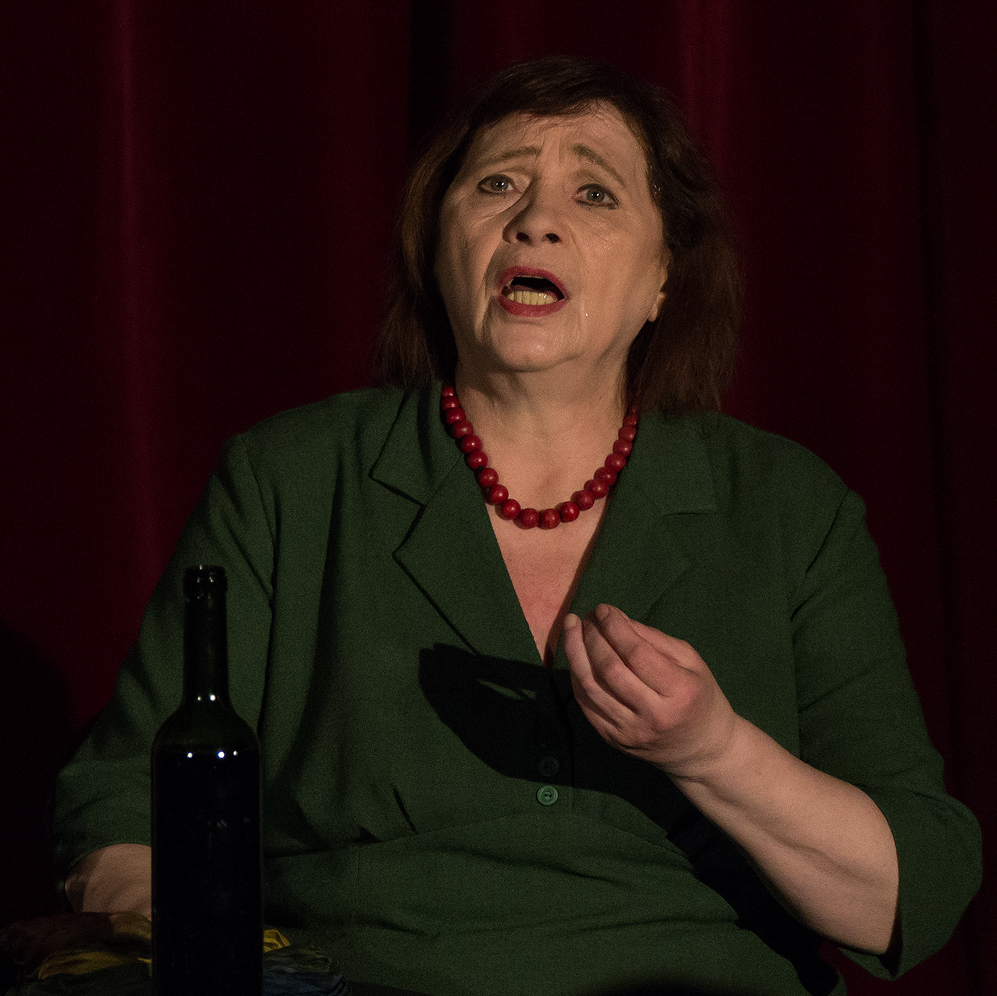
Wenche Kvamme

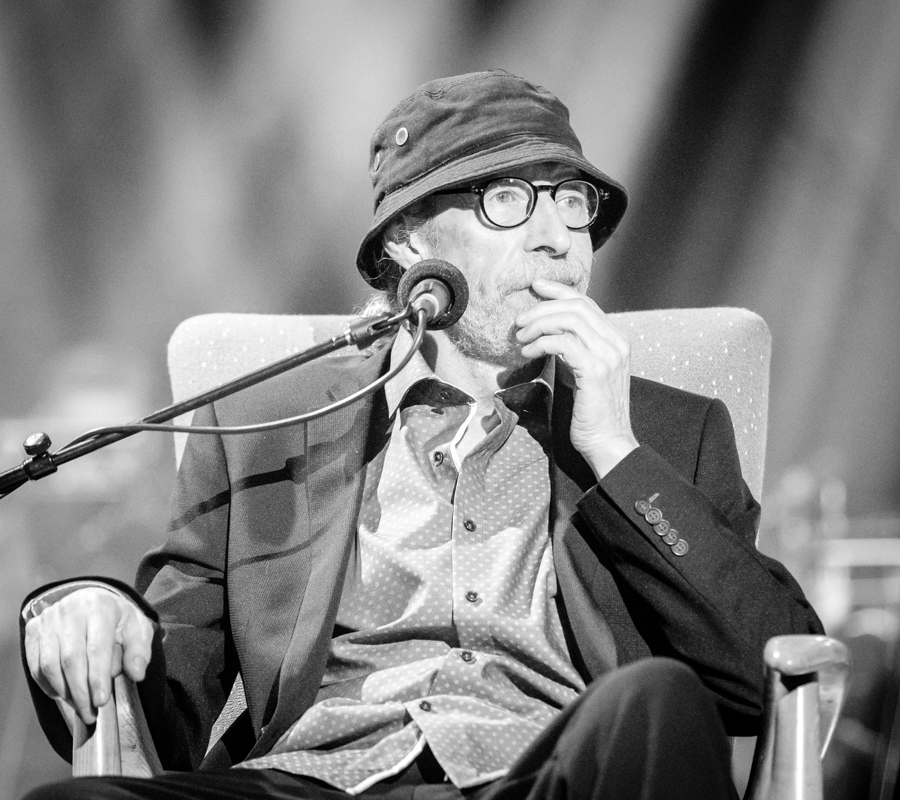
Terje Nilsen

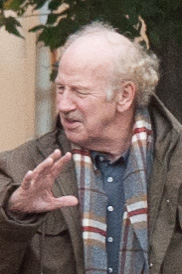
Jon Skolmen

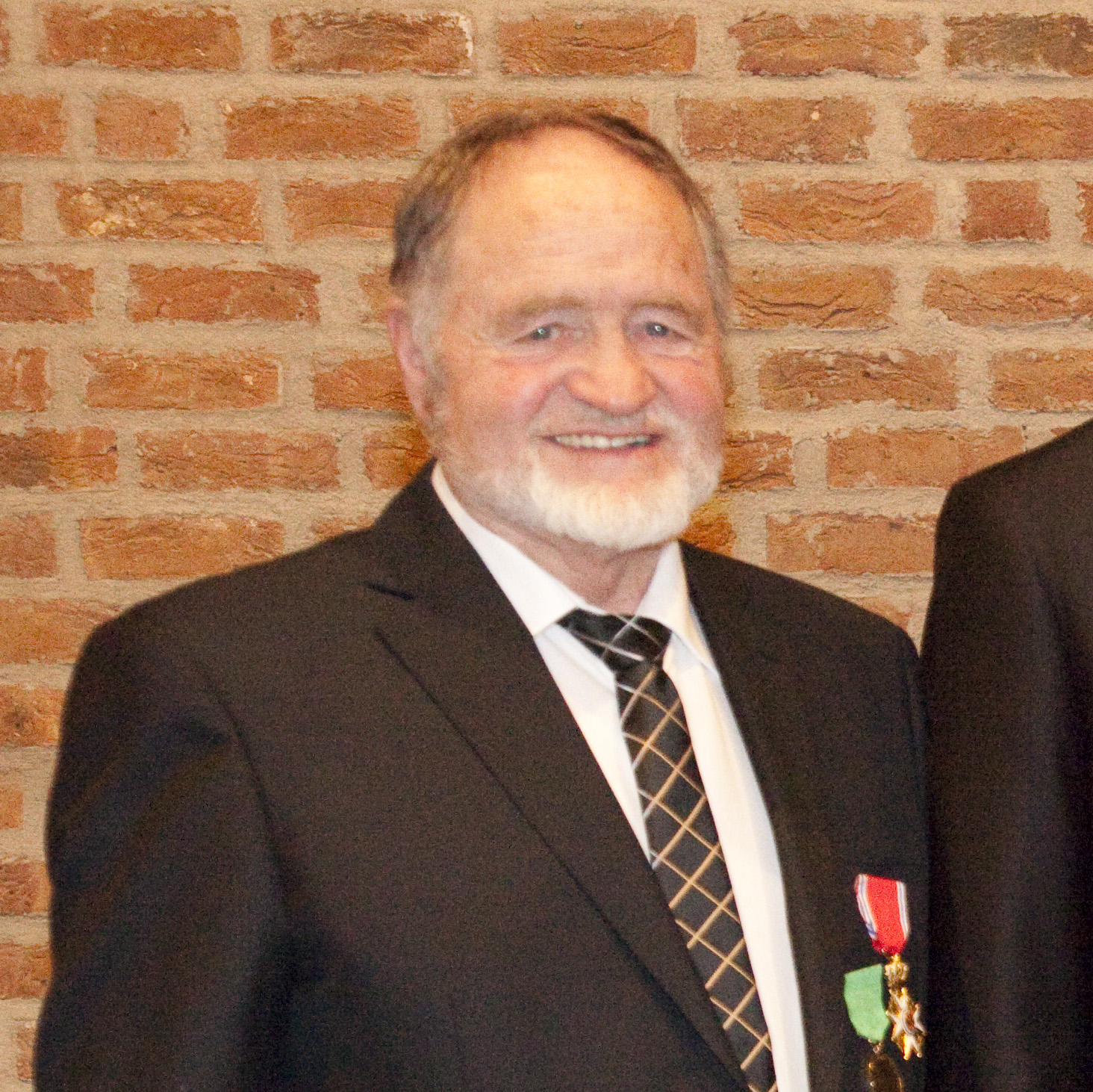
Jon Østeng Hov

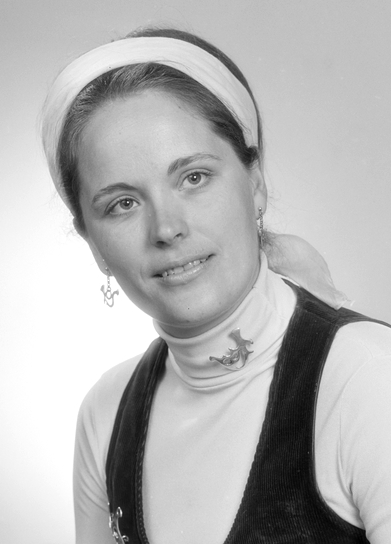
Babill Stray-Pedersen

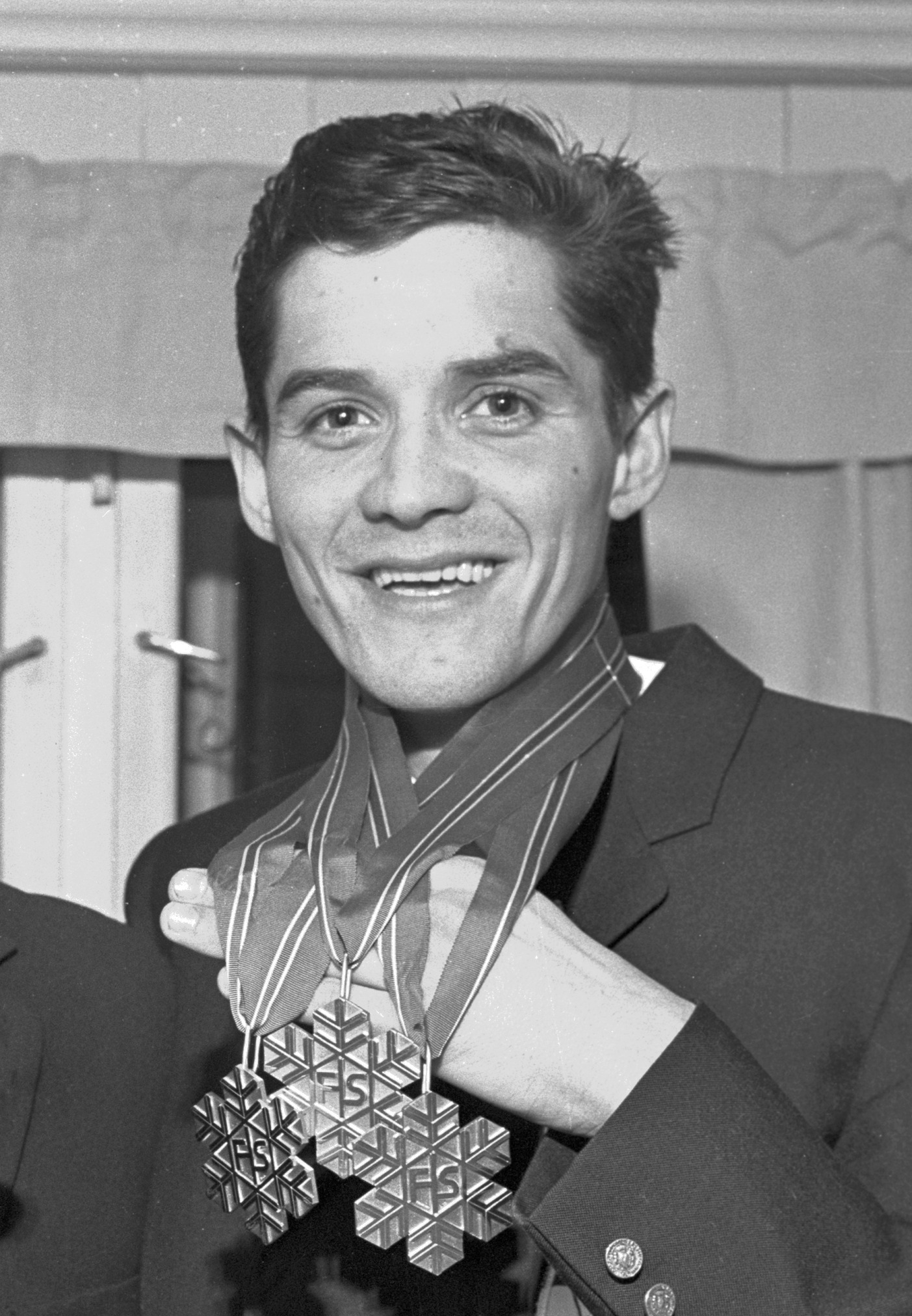
Gjermund Eggen

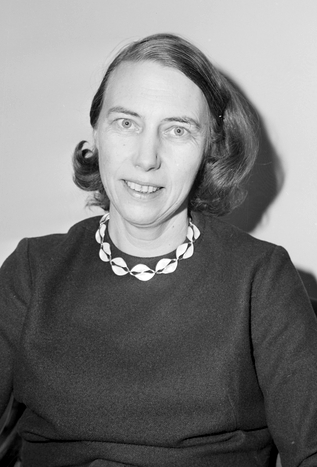
Signe Marie Stray Ryssdal

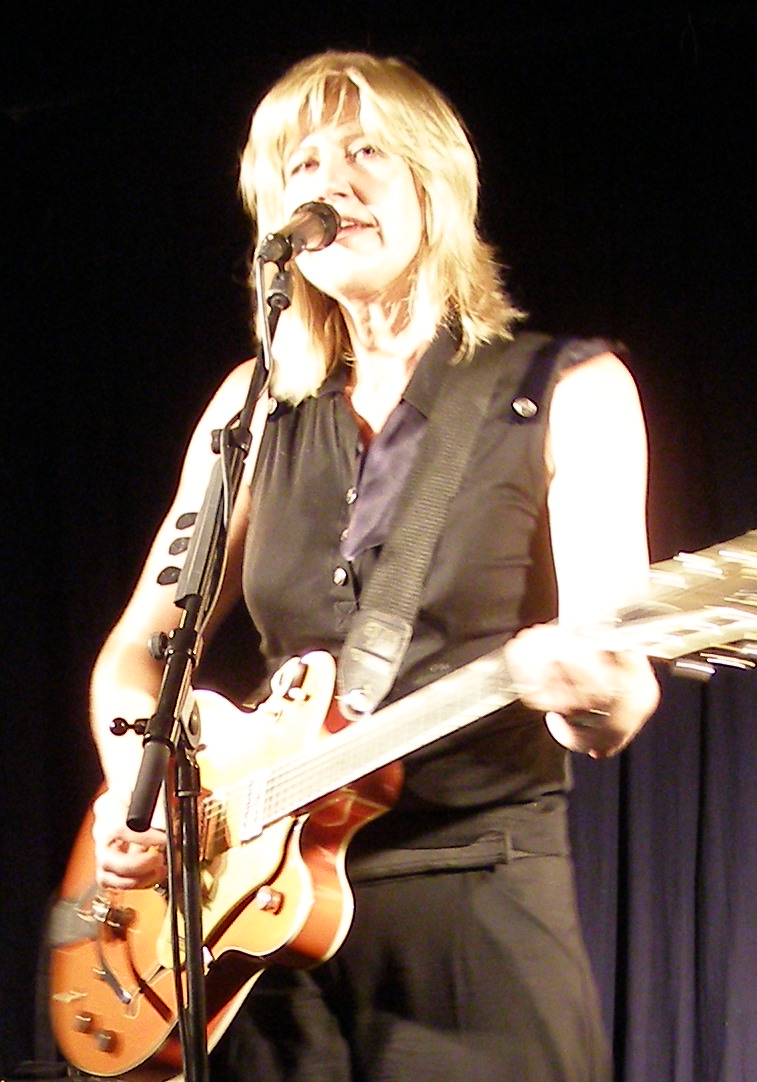
Anne Grete Preus

- 1 January − Aud Blegen Svindland, physician (b. 1928).
- 1 January − Dagfinn Bakke, illustrator (b. 1933).
- 1 January − Nils Utsi, actor, stage director and film director (b. 1943).
- 2 January − Tommy Watz, translator (b. 1958).
- 8 January − Karsten Jakobsen, engineer and rector (b. 1928).
- 8 January − Sigvald Tveit, composer (b. 1945).
- 11 January − Bjørg Skjælaaen, figure skater (born 1933).
- 12 January − Eva Seeberg, author (b. 1931).
- 15 January − Espen Thorstenson, film director (b. 1940).
- 18 January − John Krogh, footballer (b. 1938).
- 21 January − Trond Botnen, printmaker (b. 1937).
- 23 January − Reidar Aarsand, accordionist (b. 1946).
- 28 January − Ingvald Godal, politician (b. 1934).
- 29 January − Hans Normann Dahl, illustrator, painter and printmaker (b. 1937).
- 29 January − Eivind Otto Hjelle, journalist (b. 1927).
- 30 January − Per Jorsett, sports reporter (b. 1920).
- 4 February − Karen Randers-Pehrson, actress (b. 1932).
- 4 February − Ove Kristian Sundberg, musicologist and composer (b. 1932).
- 8 February − Knut Haavik, magazine editor (Se og Hør 1978−2003) (b. 1943).
- 15 February − Jens Feder, physicist (b. 1939).
- 15 February − Ragnar Halvorsen, business executive (b. 1924).
- 15 February – Åsmund Myhre, politician (b. 1925).
- 18 February − Ragnar Christiansen, politician (b. 1922).
- 19 February − Thorbjørn Olaf Tufte, non-fiction writer (b. 1933).
- Henrik Scheele, actor (b. 1952).
- 24 February − Ole Johs. Brunæs, politician (b. 1936).
- 1 March − Håkon Wexelsen Freihow, diplomat (b. 1927).
- 9 March − Wenche Kvamme, actress (b. 1950).
- 9 March − Sveinung Aarnseth, footballer (b. 1933).
- 12 March − Tom Skjønberg, yacht racer (b. 1948).
- 17 March − Hanne Aga, lyricist (b. 1947).
- 17 March − Astri Riddervold, ethnologist (b. 1925).
- 20 March − Terje Nilsen, singer (b. 1951).
- 25 March − Finn Ramsøy, resistance member (b. 1920).
- 25 March − Finn Arnesen, pulp book publisher (b. 1932).
- 28 March − Jon Skolmen, actor and comedian (b. 1940).
- 29 March − Jon Østeng Hov, nature photographer (b. 1936).
- 30 March − Morten Røhrt, actor and voice actor (b. 1954).
- 30 March − Erik Lorange, city planner (b. 1919).
- 3 April − Einar Iversen, jazz musician (b. 1930).
- 3 April − Rolf Håndstad, comics script writer (b. 1958).
- 9 April − Leif Haraldseth, politician (b. 1929).
- 15 April − Guro Fjellanger, politician (b. 1964).
- 18 April − Andreas Ugland, ship-owner (b. 1925).
- 22 April − Roy Eriksen, scholar and university professor
- 23 April − Viggo Fossum, politician (b. 1949).
- 24 April − Babill Stray-Pedersen, physician (b. 1943).
- 28 April − Bernt Rougthvedt, historian and crime writer (b. 1956).
- 1 May − Arnor Njøs, soil scientist (b. 1930).
- 3 May − Kjell Grandhagen, lieutenant general (b. 1954).
- 4 May − Terje Moe Gustavsen, politician and civil servant (b. 1954).
- 4 May − Solo Cissokho, koraist (b. 1963).
- 4 May − Arne Grimstad, novelist (b. 1923).
- 6 May − Gjermund Eggen, cross-country skier (b. 1941).
- 12 May − Eva Dahr, film director (b. 1958).
- 12 May − Mads H. Andenæs, legal scholar (b. 1940).
- 16 May − Kjell Wangen, footballer (b. 1942).
- 17 May – Jan Elvheim, politician (b. 1949).
- 18 May − Signe Marie Stray Ryssdal, barrister and politician (b. 1924).
- 19 May − Alfred Janson, composer (b. 1937).
- 21 May – Aase Texmon Rygh, sculptor (b. 1925).
- 22 May – Joar Hoff, football manager (b. 1939)
- 27 May – Karin Hafstad, politician (b. 1936).
- 29 May − Kari Oftedal Lima, politician (b. 1943).
- 30 May – Arne Lyngstad, politician (b. 1962).
- 3 June – Anne Kristin Lund, diplomat (b. 1952).
- 9 June – Erla Bergendahl Hohler, art historian (b. 1937).
- 12 June – Fredrik Hagemann, geologist and civil servant (b. 1929).
- 12 June – Olaf Sætersdal, civil servant (b. 1923).
- 17 June – Knut Andersen, film director (b. 1931).
- 19 June – Helge Stormorken, veterinarian and professor of medicine (b. 1922).
- 20 June – Helga Lie, politician (b. 1930).
- 22 June – Arild Berg, footballer (b. 1975).
- 23 June – Svanhild Salberg, politician (b. 1932).
- 2 July – Åslaug Grinde, politician (b. 1931).
- 5 July – Paolo Vinaccia, jazz drummer (b. 1954).
- 6 July – Ragnar Hoen, chess player (b. 1925).
- 6 July – Lasse Sæther, film producer (b. 1948).
- 10 July – Arvid Andreassen, illustrator (b. 1931).
- 12 July – Paul Karlsen, festival impresario (b. 1947).
- 16 July – Fatma Jynge, politician (b. 1945).
- 19 July – Lasse Trædal, non-fiction writer (b. 1945).
- 20 July – Leif Jørgen Aune, economist and politician (b. 1925).
- 26 July – Dagfinn Stenseth, diplomat (b. 1936).
- 27 July – Kolbjørn Brekstad, diplomat (b. 1932).
- 29 July – Egil Danielsen, javelin thrower (b. 1933).
- 30 July – Steinar Johannessen, footballer (b. 1936).
- 1 August – Ingrid Aune, politician (b. 1985).
- 2 August – Oluf Fuglerud, politician (b. 1924).
- 5 August – Else Kollerud Furre, politician (b. 1922).
- 8 August – Erling Wicklund, jazz trombonist (b. 1944).
- 11 August – Oddbjørn Knutsen, political scientist (b. 1953).
- 12 August – Jan Simonsen, politician (b. 1953).
- 18 August − Ansgar Torvik, physician (b. 1925).
- 25 August – Anne Grete Preus, musician (b. 1957).
- 26 August – Per Farstad, designer (b. 1951).
- 27 August – Sven Trygve Falck, politician (b. 1943).
- 31 August – Agnar Sandmo, economist (b. 1938).
- 31 August – Else Heimstad, war sailor activist (b. 1924).
- 3 September – Halvard Hanevold, biathlete (b. 1969).
- 3 September − Eivin Sannes, jazz pianist (b. 1937).
- 8 September − Olav Skjevesland, bishop (b. 1942).
- 18 September − Tony Mills, rock singer (b. 1962).
- 18 September − Willy Jansson, politician (b. 1927).
- 24 September − Magnar Lussand, politician (b. 1945).
- 26 September – Kåre Tønnesson, historian (b. 1926).
- 27 September – Unni Evjen, actress (b. 1943).
- 28 September − Jan E. Rivelsrud, hotelier (b. 1940).
- 9 October – Erling Steineide, cross-country skier (b. 1938).
- 14 October – Gunnar Torvund, sculptor (b. 1948).
- 20 October − Asbjørn Liland, politician (b. 1936).
- 20 October − Øivind Hvattum, politician (b. 1935).
- 21 October – Pål Caspersen, ship-owner (b. ).
- 22 October − Lena Marie Fossen, photographic artist (b. 1986).
- 24 October – Kristin Johnson, continuity announcer (b. 1940).
- 26 October – Guttorm Guttormsgaard, artist (b. 1938).
- 5 November – Jan Erik Kongshaug, music producer (b. 1944).
- 13 November − Reidar Skotgård, politician (b. 1936).
- 15 November – Olav Bjørgaas, physician and missionary (b. 1926)
- 17 November − Åse-Marit Dobloug, politician (b. 1936).
- 20 November – Erik Magnus Alfsen, mathematician (b. 1930).
- 22 November – Kaare Norum, nutritionist and rector (b. 1932).
- 28 November − Grethe G. Fossum, politician (b. 1945).
- 3 December – Ragnar Ulstein, resistance member and writer (b. 1920).
- 7 December – Grete Roede, weightloss magnate (b. 1939).
- 7 December – Vigdis Ystad, literary historian (b. 1942).
- 16 December − Johan Syrstad, politician (b. 1924).
- 17 December − Hans O. Bjøntegård, businessperson (b. 1932).
- 21 December − Thor Bjarne Bore, editor (b. 1938).
- 25 December − Ari Behn, author and former husband of Princess Märtha Louise (b. 1972).
- 28 December − Harald Thon, orienteer (b. 1954).
- 29 December − Oluf Skarpnes, civil servant (b. 1929).
