= Dagsnytt Atten =

Daily news radio programme on Norwegian radio station NRK P2

Dagsnytt 18
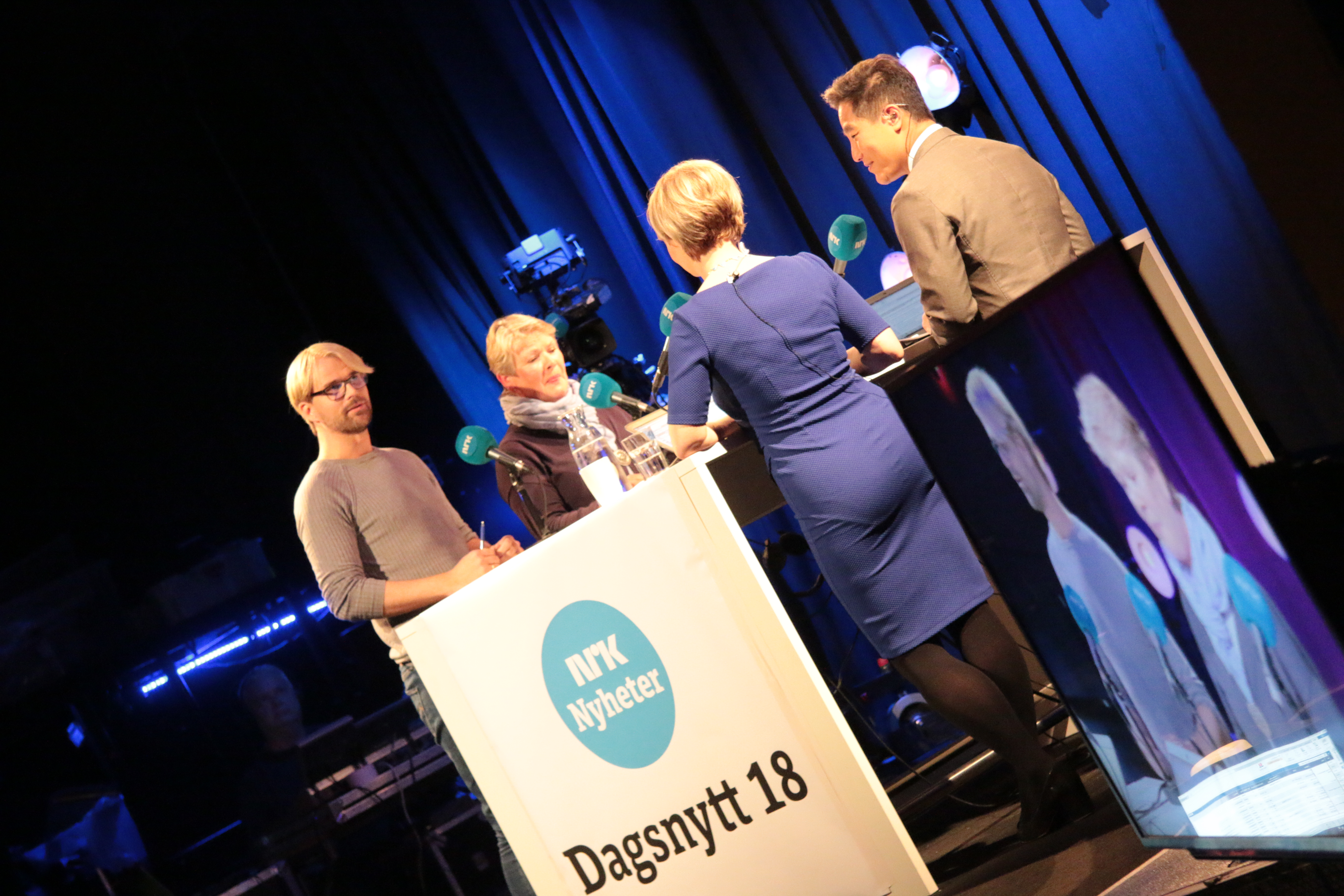
- Running time: 60 minutes
- Country of origin: Norway
- Language: Norwegian
- Home station: NRK P2
- Syndicates: NRK Alltid nyheter
- TV adaptations: NRK2
- Hosted by: various
- Recording studio: Oslo, Norway
- Original release: 1990
- Podcast: radio.nrk.no/podkast/dagsnytt_atten

Dagsnytt 18 ("Day's news 18") is a daily news magazine from Norwegian radio station NRK P2. Broadcast every weekday at 18:00, the programme hosts discussions and debates on the topics of the day featuring politicians and other Norwegian figures. Dagsnytt 18 is broadcast on NRK P2 and NRK Alltid nyheter. The programme has also been broadcast on NRK2 television since 2007, when television cameras were installed in the radio studio and in the control room. When guests appear by phone, a photograph of the person is usually displayed for the television audience. Although it is a radio programme, Dagsnytt Atten has a larger audience on TV than on radio. It had about 100,000 viewers a day on TV in 2015 and around 60,000 listeners on radio.

Lasting one hour, Dagsnytt 18 is part of the Dagsnytt's magazine department. The program was launched in 1990 as Atten Tretti ("Eighteen Thirty", or "6:30 p.m.") and changed its name to Dagsnytt Atten in 1992.

== Current and past hosts ==
- Lars-Jacob Krogh
- Johan Sigmunn Hebnes
- Hans-Wilhelm Steinfeld
- Alf Hartgen
- Sverre Tom Radøy
- Sigrid Sollund
- Eva Nordlund
- Lilly Fritzman
- Kai Sibbern
- Christer Gilje
- Marte Michelet
- Frithjof Jacobsen
- Ole Reinert Omvik
- Erik Aasheim
- Tomm Kristiansen
- Tor Øystein Vaaland
- Anne Grosvold
