= Kaasen =

Kaasen is a Norwegian surname. Notable people with the surname include:

- Gunnar Kaasen (1882–1960), Norwegian musher
- Knut Kaasen (born 1951), Norwegian legal scholar
- Paal Kaasen (1883–1963), Norwegian sailor
