= Trygve Harvold =

Norwegian civil servant (born 1944)

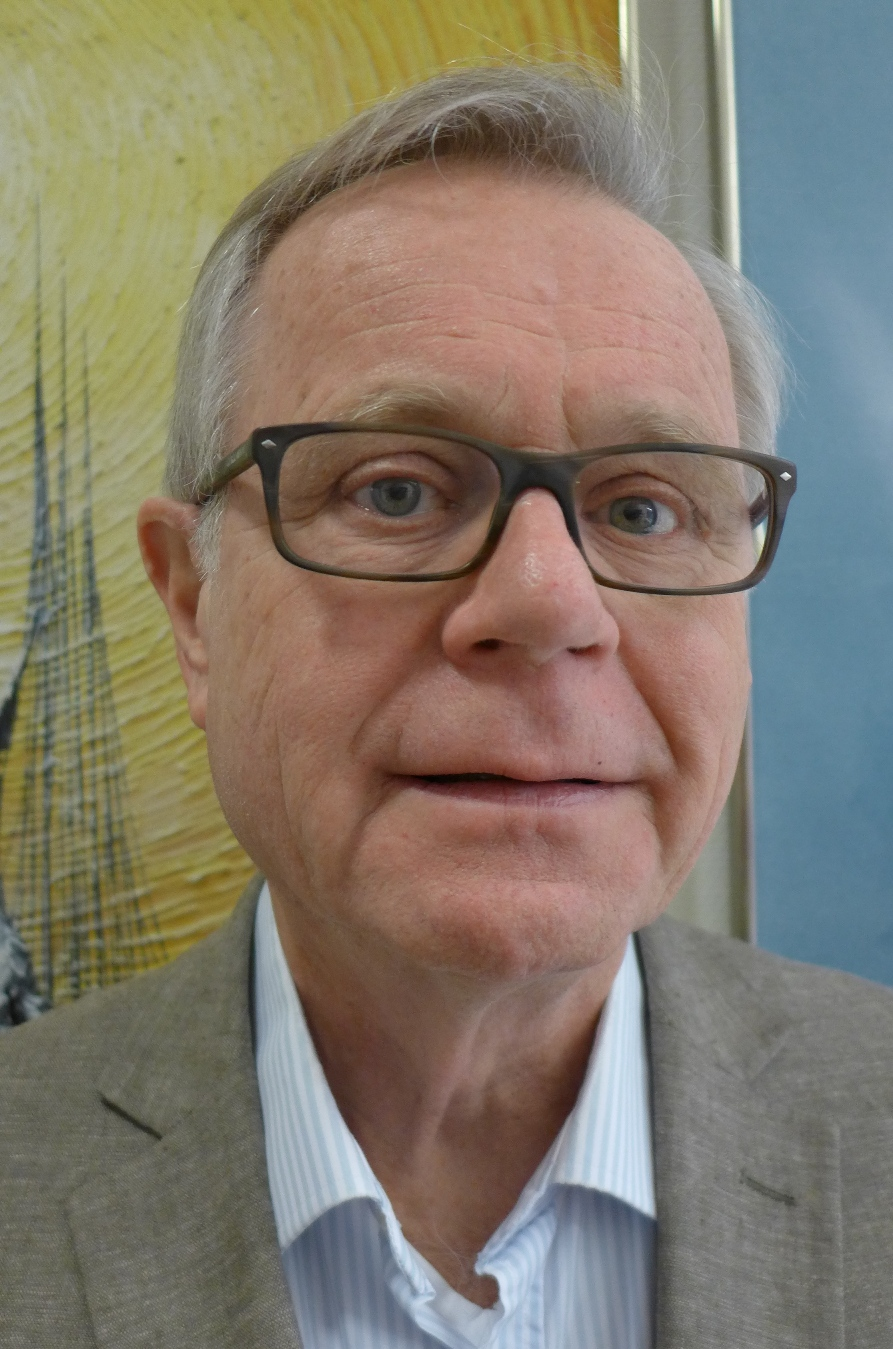
Trygve Harvold, former managing director of the Lovdata Foundation, January 2017.

Trygve Harvold (born 28 August 1944) is a Norwegian civil servant.

In 1981 he was hired as the managing director of Lovdata, a position he held until 1 September 2010. He was appointed a Knight, 1st Class of the Royal Norwegian Order of St. Olav in 2000 for his work in Lovdata.

From 2003 to 2011 he was a member of the Norwegian Parliamentary Intelligence Oversight Committee.
