= Kvamme =

Kvamme is a Norwegian surname. Notable people with the surname include:

- E. Floyd Kvamme (born 1938), American engineer, venture capitalist, and government advisor
- Helge Kvamme (1938–1996), Norwegian jurist and businessperson
- Mark Kvamme (born 1961), American venture capitalist
- Martin Kvamme (born 1975), Norwegian graphic designer and illustrator
- Torstein Kvamme (1893–1985), Norwegian politician
- Wenche Kvamme (1950–2019), Norwegian singer and actress

== See also ==
- Kvammen
