= Leidulv =

Leidulv is a Norwegian given name. Notable people with the name include:

- Leidulv Namtvedt (born 1950), Norwegian diplomat
- Leidulv Risan (born 1948), Norwegian screenwriter, film director, and professor
