= Magistad =

Magistad is a surname. Notable people with the surname include:

- Inga Magistad (born 1950), Norwegian diplomat
- Mary Kay Magistad, American journalist
