= Stenseth =

Stenseth is a surname. Notable people with the surname include:

- Ane Appelkvist Stenseth (born 1996), Norwegian cross-country skier
- Dagfinn Stenseth (1936–2019), Norwegian diplomat
- Hans Stenseth (1896–1994), Norwegian flautist
- Martinus Stenseth (1890–1979), American World War I veteran
- Nils Christian Stenseth (born 1949), Norwegian biologist
- Jason Stenseth (born 1985), Entrepreneur and Author
