= Namtvedt =

Namtvedt is a Norwegian surname. Notable people with the surname include:

- Bo André Namtvedt (born 1967), Norwegian racing cyclist
- Leidulv Namtvedt (born 1950), Norwegian diplomat
- Olav Steinar Namtvedt (born 1947), Norwegian politician
