= Knut Hauge (diplomat) =

Norwegian diplomat

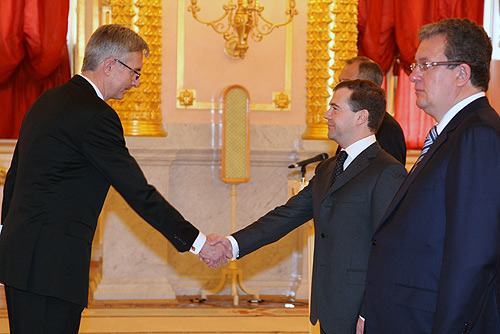
Hauge presented his credentials to Dmitry Medvedev in February 2009.

Knut Hauge (born 28 July 1953) is a Norwegian diplomat.

He took the cand.philol. degree in his education and started working for the Norwegian Ministry of Foreign Affairs in 1980. He served as consul-general in Murmansk from 1993 to 1994, as the Norwegian ambassador to Poland from 2005 to 2008, and Norwegian ambassador to Russia from 2008 to 2013. He presented his credentials to Russian president Dmitry Medvedev on 27 February 2009. In 2014 he was appointed as the Permanent Representative of Norway to NATO, returning to the Ministry of Foreign Affairs in 2018 as a deputy under-secretary of state.

Diplomatic posts
Preceded by Øyvind Nordsletten	Norwegian ambassador to Russia; 2008–2013	Succeeded by Leidulv Namtvedt
Diplomatic posts
Preceded by Vegard Ellefsen	Norwegian Permanent Representative to NATO; 2014–2018	Succeeded by Øystein Bø
