= Erling Selvig =

Norwegian legal scholar and judge (born 1931)

Erling Christian Øverland Selvig (born 23 August 1931) is a Norwegian legal scholar and judge.

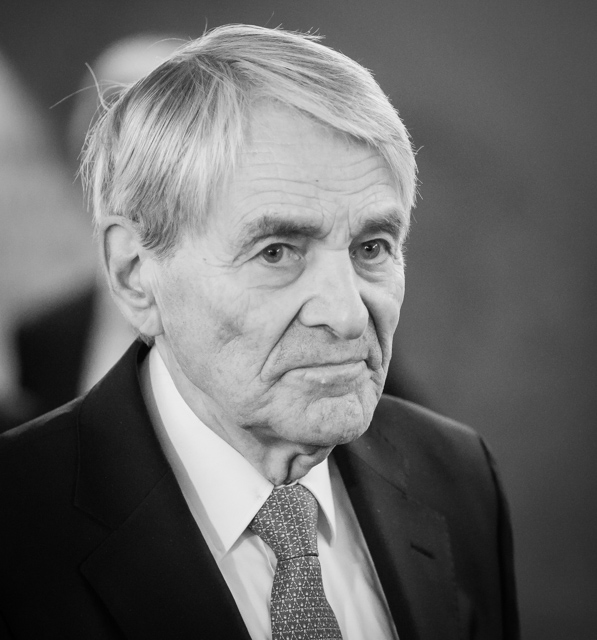

He was born in Egge Municipality as a son of manager Sverre Arthur Birger Selvig (1892–1968) and Sigfrid Øverland (1900–1984). He finished his secondary education in Levanger in 1950 and graduated with the cand.jur. degree at the University of Oslo in 1957. He was hired as a research assistant in the same year, and in 1959 he took the Master of Comparative Law degree at the University of Michigan. His first marriage lasted from 1957 to 1981, the second to deputy under-secretary of state Kirsten Ullbæk Petersen (born 1950) started in 1984.

He was a research fellow from 1959 and docent from 1964, and took the dr.juris degree in 1968 on the thesis Det såkalte husbondsansvar. From 1968 to 2001 he was a professor at the University of Oslo, and he also served as dean of the Faculty of Law from 1989 to 1994. He headed the Scandinavian Institute of Maritime Law from 1973 to 1988. Notable works include The Freight Risk, Fra transportrettens og kjøpsrettens grenseland (2nd edition 1975) and Kjøpsrett (3rd edition 2006).

He chaired a transport committee in the United Nations Conference on Trade and Development from 1973 to 1978, was an ad hoc judge in the EFTA Court from 1997 to 2001 as well as an arbitration court judge in Norway. He has chaired several committees delivering Norwegian Official Reports. From 1986 to 2002 he was the chairman of the board of the Financial Supervisory Authority of Norway.

He holds an honorary degree at Stockholm University and was decorated as a Commander of the Royal Norwegian Order of St. Olav in 2003.

Academic offices
Preceded by	Dean of the Faculty of Law, University of Oslo; 1989–1994	Succeeded by Frederik Zimmer
