= Norsk Lovtidend =

Norwegian legal magazine published by the Ministry of Justice and the Police

- Categories: Law magazine
- Publisher: Ministry of Justice and Public Security
- Founded: 1877
- Final issue: 2016 (print)
- Country: Norway
- Based in: Oslo
- Language: Norwegian
- Website: Norsk Lovtidend
- OCLC: 42599806

Norsk Lovtidend (Norwegian Law Gazette) is a Norwegian periodical published by the Ministry of Justice and the Police. The magazine was first published in 1877. It is regulated by a law from 1969 (Norwegian: Lov om Norsk Lovtidend m.v.), which replaced an earlier law from 1876. From 2001 official publication of new laws or revisions are made on Lovdata's website, while a printed version continued to be published until 2016.
