= Frederik Zimmer =

Norwegian legal scholar (born 1944)

Frederik Zimmer (born 1944) is a Norwegian legal scholar.

He graduated with the cand.jur. degree in 1970. He worked as a deputy judge from 1970 to 1971, then as a lecturer and research fellow at the University of Oslo from 1971. He took his dr.juris degree in 1978 and was promoted to professor in 1987. His field is tax law.

He was the dean of the Faculty of Law from 1995 to 2000, and has also been an acting Supreme Court Justice. In 2007 he received an honorary degree at Stockholm University. He is a member of the Norwegian Academy of Science and Letters.

Academic offices
Preceded by Erling Selvig	Dean of the Faculty of Law, University of Oslo; 1995–2000	Succeeded by Knut Kaasen
