= Per Tresselt =

Norwegian diplomat (1937–2025)

Per Tresselt (4 January 1937 – 18 November 2025) was a Norwegian diplomat.

He was born in Bergen and was a cand.jur. by education. He became deputy under-secretary of state in the Ministry of Foreign Affairs in 1983, served as the Norwegian ambassador to East Germany from 1989 to 1990, consul-general in united Berlin from 1990 to 1994 and ambassador to Russia from 1994 to 1999. In 2000, he was appointed a judge in the EFTA Court.

Tresselt died on 18 November 2025, at the age of 88.

Diplomatic posts
Preceded by Dagfinn Stenseth	Norwegian ambassador to Russia; 1994–1999	Succeeded by Øyvind Nordsletten
