= Hans Petter Graver =

Norwegian legal scholar (born 1955)

Hans Petter Graver (born 5 November 1955) is a Norwegian legal scholar. He serves as professor and was the dean at the Faculty of Law, University of Oslo between 2008 and 2015. He was replaced by Dag Michalsen.

== Career ==
He is a son of Siren and Petter Graver, and a grandson of Torjus Graver.

He obtained the cand.jur. degree in 1980 and the dr.juris degree in 1986. He served his military service as a lawyer at the Judge Advocate General's office. In 1981, he became research fellow at the Faculty of Law. He was an advocate (barrister) at the Office of the Attorney General of Norway 1990–1992. Since 1993, he has been professor of law at the University of Oslo, first at the Department of Sociology of Law, then at the Centre for European Law, and since 2002 at the Department of Private Law. He is the faculty's dean since 2007.

He is a member of the Norwegian Academy of Science and Letters. From October–December 2016 he was a Fellow of the Institute of Advanced Study based at Durham University. He was awarded an honorary doctorate at the University of Helsinki in 2010, the University of Heidelberg in 2017, and the University of Uppsala in 2020.

== Books ==
- Rettferdighetens helter. Lovens voktere gjennom tusen år ('heros of justice - guardians of the law during the previous thousand years'). 2026
- Judges Against Justice On Judges When the Rule of Law is Under Attack. Springer, 2015 ISBN 978-3-662-44292-0.
- Hva er rett. Universitetsforlaget, 2011. ISBN 978-82-15-01727-3.
- Rett, retorikk og juridisk argumentasjon. Keiserens garderobe og andre essays. Universitetsforlaget, 2010. ISBN 978-82-15-01703-7.
- Juridisk overtalelseskunst. Fagbokforlaget, 2008. ISBN 978-82-450-0751-0.
- Alminnelig forvaltningsrett, 3rd ed. Universitetsforlaget, 2007. ISBN 978-82-15-01148-6.
- Rettsretorikk. En metodelære. Fagbokforlaget, 2007. ISBN 978-82-450-0604-9.
- Norsk konkurranserett, vol 2, Prosess og sanksjoner. Universitetsforlaget, 2006 (with Erling Johan Hjelmeng), ISBN 978-82-15-01033-5.
- National Judicial Reaction to Supranationality in the EC and the EEA. Universitetsforlaget, 2004 (editor). ISBN 82-15-00560-8.
- Alminnelig forvaltningsrett, 2nd ed., Universitetsforlaget, 2002. ISBN 82-15-00324-9.
- Materiell forvaltningsrett : med særlig vekt på grunnprinsippene. Universitetsforlaget 1996. ISBN 82-00-22741-3.
- Forvaltningsprosessen : lærebok i reglene om forvaltningens saksbehandling. Universitetsforlaget 1996. ISBN 82-00-22619-0.
- Forvaltningsrett i markedsstaten. Fagbokforlaget, 2002. ISBN 82-7674-862-7.
- Gjeldsordningsloven med kommentarer. Tano 1993. ISBN 82-518-3135-0.
- Sosiale rettigheter i gjeldsforhold : håndbok i gjeldsrådgivning. Tano 1992. ISBN 82-518-2790-6.
- Den juristskapte virkelighet. Tano, 1986. ISBN 82-518-2247-5.

Academic offices
Preceded by Jon T. Johnsen	Dean of the Faculty of Law, University of Oslo; 2007–present	Incumbent
