= Rune Resaland =

Norwegian diplomat

Rune Resaland (born 4 May 1956) is a Norwegian diplomat.

He was born in Ullensaker and is a cand.jur. by education. He started working for the Norwegian Ministry of Foreign Affairs in 1986, and served as subdirector from 1997 and secretary of the parliamentary Standing Committee on Foreign Affairs from 1999. He moved abroad as embassy counsellor in the United States from 2003 to 2007, returned to the Ministry of Foreign Affairs as senior adviser, head of department and deputy under-secretary of state between 2007 and 2018. In 2018 he became the Norwegian ambassador to Russia.

Diplomatic posts
Preceded by Leidulv Namtvedt	Norwegian ambassador to Russia; 2018–	Incumbent
