= Øystein Bø =

Norwegian politician (born 1959)

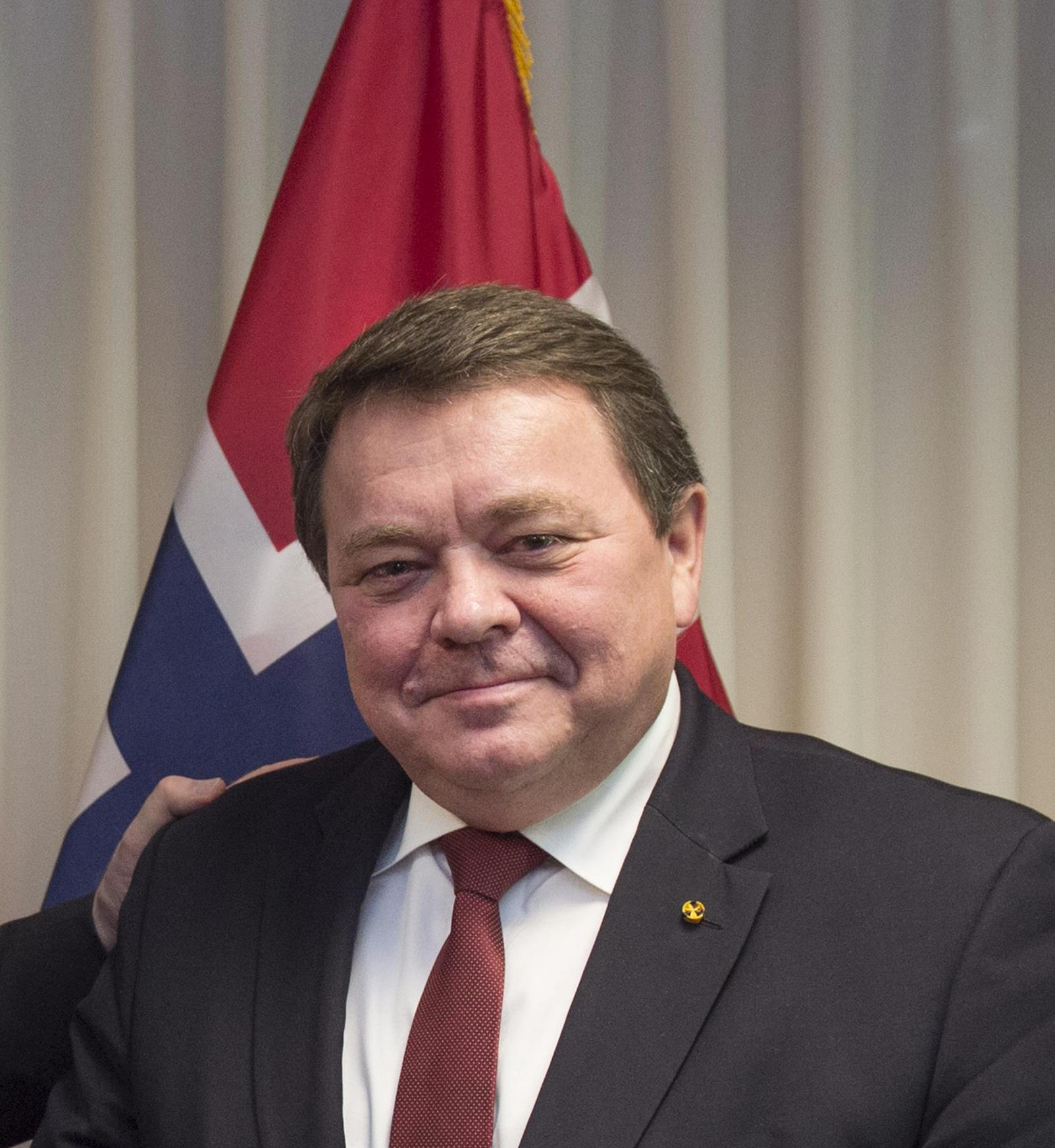
Øystein Bø 2016

Øystein Bø (born 19 November 1959) is a Norwegian diplomat and politician for the Conservative Party.

He is a cand.jur. by education and started working for the Norwegian Ministry of Foreign Affairs in 1990. He served as subdirector from 2000 and head of department from 2001 to 2006. The next four years he spent as an embassy counsellor at the Norwegian delegation to NATO in Brussels. He served as secretary of the parliamentary Standing Committee on Foreign Affairs from 2010 to 2013, and then entered politics as State Secretary in the Ministry of Defence from 2013 to 2017. In 2018 he became the Norwegian Permanent Representative to NATO.

Diplomatic posts
Preceded by Knut Hauge	Norwegian Permanent Representative to NATO; 2018–	Incumbent
