= Jon T. Johnsen =

Norwegian legal scholar (born 1942)

Jon Thorvald Johnsen (born 25 October 1942) is a Norwegian legal scholar.

He graduated with the cand.jur. degree in 1969. In his early career he worked as a research assistant at the University of Oslo, deputy judge, research fellow at the University of Tromsø and researcher for the Norwegian Ministry of Justice. He became an associate professor at the University of Oslo in 1978, took his dr.juris degree in 1986 and was promoted to professor in 1990.

He was the dean of the Faculty of Law from 2004 to 2007. He was a visiting scholar at the University of California, Los Angeles from 1989 to 1990, assisting professor at the University of Tromsø from 1990 to 1993, visiting scholar at the University of California, Berkeley from 1995 to 1996, and at the University of Copenhagen in 2002 and 2009. In 2008 he was an IUEU Centre Distinguished Research Fellow at Flinders University. Since 2003 he is the Norwegian member of the European Commission for the Efficiency of Justice.

He has also been involved in Juss-Buss.

Academic offices
Preceded by Knut Kaasen	Dean of the Faculty of Law, University of Oslo; 2004–2007	Succeeded by Hans Petter Graver
