= Vegard Ellefsen =

Norwegian diplomat

Vegard Ellefsen (born 2 November 1950) is a Norwegian diplomat.

He is a cand.polit. by education and started working for the Norwegian Ministry of Foreign Affairs in 1981.

After a period as embassy counsellor at the Norwegian NATO delegation in Brussels from 1997 to 2002 he returned to the Ministry of Foreign Affairs. Here he served as senior adviser from 2002, deputy under-secretary of state from 2004 and director of politics from 2008. From 2010 to 2014 he was Norway's Permanent Representative to NATO, before being hired as chief of cabinet for NATO's new secretary-general Jens Stoltenberg. After one year he worked as a special envoy in the Ministry of Foreign Affairs for Iraq/Syria affairs. He finished his career as Norwegian ambassador to Turkey between 2016 and 2019.

Diplomatic posts
Preceded by Kim Traavik	Norwegian Permanent Representative to NATO; 2010–2014	Succeeded by Knut Hauge
