= Olav Bucher-Johannessen =

Norwegian diplomat and politician (1926–2018)

Olav Bucher Johannessen (28 October 1926 – 15 July 2018) was a Norwegian diplomat and politician for the Labour Party.

He was born in Bergen, and had a cand.oecon. degree in economics. He was hired in the Ministry of Foreign Affairs in 1955, and was promoted to special adviser in 1974. After serving as a State Secretary for Odvar Nordli in the Office of the Prime Minister from 1979 to 1981, he was the Norwegian ambassador to Finland from 1982 to 1985, to the Soviet Union from 1985 to 1990 and to Sweden from 1990 to 1994.

Diplomatic posts
Preceded by Dagfinn Stenseth	Norwegian ambassador to the Soviet Union; 1985–1990	Succeeded by Dagfinn Stenseth
