= Petter Graver =

Norwegian diplomat (1920–1995)

Petter Graver (30 May 1920 – 21 January 1995) was a Norwegian jurist who first served as a diplomat from 1947 to 1988, then as a lawyer until his death. He was the Norwegian ambassador to several countries, among them Israel and the Soviet Union.

== Early life and career ==
He was born in Tinn Municipality to the politician and accountant Torjus Graver. His father was hired as head of accounting in the Norwegian Confederation of Trade Unions in 1933, and the family moved to Bærum. In 1954 Petter Graver married Siren Hognestad. They had a daughter and two sons, including the law professor and dean Hans Petter Graver.

As a teenager, Petter became active in the Labour Party. He became chair of the Workers' Youth League in Bærum, and also board member in Bærum Labour Party in 1939. He finished his secondary education in 1940, and had his political career interrupted by the occupation of Norway when the Labour Party was declared illegal. He fought in the Norwegian Campaign of the spring 1940, and later fled to Canada where he received pilot training.

He later enrolled in law studies; while studying he was briefly employed in Arbeidernes Opplysningsforbund. He graduated from the University of Oslo with the cand.jur. degree in 1947.

== Diplomatic career ==
He was hired by the Ministry of Foreign Affairs in 1947, but started out as a graduate of an air force academy in the UK. In 1949, however, he was posted as vice consul in Geneva. After a tenure as legation secretary in Rio de Janeiro from 1951 to 1954 he was embassy secretary in Paris from 1956 to 1958. He then attended NATO Defence College and the Norwegian Joint Staff College in 1958–1959. His next station abroad was as embassy counsellor in the Soviet Union from 1961 to 1964.

He served as an envoy to Berlin from 1969, then as the Norwegian ambassador to Israel from 1971 to 1975, to the Soviet Union from 1975 to 1979, to Canada from 1979 to 1983 and to the Netherlands from 1983 to 1988. As a diplomat he was regarded by US authorities in 1975 as "perceptive, capable and highly intelligent, with a fine appreciation of the 'realities' of dealing with the Soviets. Although understanding and helpful to Americans, he is reportedly an independent thinker and a skillful, tenacious advocate of the Norwegian position."

While serving in Tel Aviv he also acted as the Norwegian ambassador to Cyprus. His tenure coincided with a very turbulent period in Israeli society, with the Yom Kippur War, the Munich massacre, and the Mossad assassination of Ahmed Bouchiki in the small Norwegian town Lillehammer in 1973. Bouchiki was thought to have a connection with the Munich massacre, and was assassinated as a retaliation, but this proved to be groundless. In a 1974 letter to his employers in the Ministry of Foreign Affairs of Norway, Graver explained the Bouchiki case as a result of Western European countries failing to heed a call from Israel to cooperate on counter-terrorism. As Norwegian authorities detained the Mossad agents who killed the innocent Bouchiki, an Israeli group planned to kidnap Graver and demand the liberation of the agents as a ransom. This plan came to light in a 1987 book by Yair Kotler on Meir Kahane, the alleged leader of the plot.

After retiring from the foreign service he started a new career as a lawyer. He was on his way to becoming a barrister, carrying through his first of three trial cases for the Supreme Court of Norway in 1994, at the age of 74. However, he died in January 1995. He was buried at Vestre gravlund. Graver was decorated as a Knight, First Class of the Order of St. Olav (1969), and Commander of the Order of Merit of the Italian Republic.

Diplomatic posts
Preceded by	Norwegian ambassador to Israel; 1971–1975	Succeeded by
Preceded by Frithjof Jacobsen	Norwegian ambassador to the Soviet Union; 1975–1979	Succeeded by Dagfinn Stenseth
