= Øyvind Nordsletten =

Norwegian diplomat

Øyvind Nordsletten (born 1 June 1944) is a Norwegian diplomat.

He was born in Time Municipality. He started working for the Norwegian Ministry of Foreign Affairs in 1974. He was the Norwegian ambassador to Ukraine from 1992 to 1996, deputy under-secretary of state in the Norwegian Office of the Prime Minister from 1998 to 1999, Norwegian ambassador to Russia from 2000 to 2008 and to Ireland from 2008 to 2011. In 2011 he was assigned the position as the Norwegian Consul General in Murmansk, Russia. In 2000 he was decorated as a Commander of the Royal Norwegian Order of St. Olav.

Diplomatic posts
Preceded by Per Tresselt	Norwegian ambassador to Russia; 2000–2008	Succeeded by Knut Hauge
