= Trond Botnen =

Norwegian printmaker, painter, sculptor, and poet (1937–2019)

- Born: 30 November 1937; Porsgrunn, Norway
- Died: 21 January 2019 (aged 81); Drøbak, Norway
- Education: Norwegian National Academy of Craft and Art Industry
- Occupations: Printmaker, painter, sculptor and poet

Trond Botnen (30 November 1937 – 21 January 2019) was a Norwegian printmaker, painter, sculptor and poet.

Botnen was born in Porsgrunn to Olav S. Botnen and Snefried Gudbrandsen. He resided in Drøbak. He attended the Norwegian National Academy of Craft and Art Industry and made his debut exhibition in 1963.

He is represented at the National Gallery in Oslo, at the Norwegian Museum of Contemporary Art, at Trondheim Kunstmuseum, Lillehammer Art Museum and other galleries. His poetry collections include Nattordbok from 1970 and Gruver Toms hytte from 1971.
