= Reidar Skotgård =

Norwegian politician (1936–2019)

Reidar Skotgård (18 November 1936 – 13 November 2019) was a Norwegian politician for the Conservative Party.

He served as a deputy representative to the Parliament of Norway from Akershus during the terms 1985–1989 and 1989–1993. In total he met during 63 days of parliamentary session. He served as mayor of Nittedal.
