= Lovdata =

Norwegian legal publishing foundation

Lovdata is a Norwegian foundation which publishes judicial information of Norway.

It publishes the periodical Norsk lovtidend, and Lov&Data and EuroRett, and hosts a website with free, public access to all Norwegian laws and other judicial documents, including court rulings.

Lovdata was established on 1 July 1981 by the Norwegian Ministry of Justice and the Police and the foundation Det juridiske fakultets lovsamlingsfond [Lovsamlingsfondet] (The Norwegian Statute Book Foundation at the Faculty of Law at the University of Oslo).

It has had a database since 1983 and published laws on CDs since 1990.

Managing director is Odd Storm-Paulsen, and the board consists of Knut Kaasen (chairman), Ida Børresen, Ketil Gjøen, Anne K. Herse and Randi Birgitte Bull.

In 2018, Lovdata sued Håkon Wium Lie and another person for having published Norwegian court decisions openly on rettspraksis.no. Lovdata, which offers access to such court decisions for an annual fee, sued the leechers for having siphoned Lovdata's servers. In less than 24 hours, the Oslo court had ordered the web site to close and for the volunteers to pay for Lovdata's legal bills. Later, in September 2019, the Norwegian Supreme Court ordered l Wium Lie and Fredrik Ljone to remove all court decisions illegally copied from Lovdata.
