= Kjell Aamot =

Norwegian business executive (born 1950)

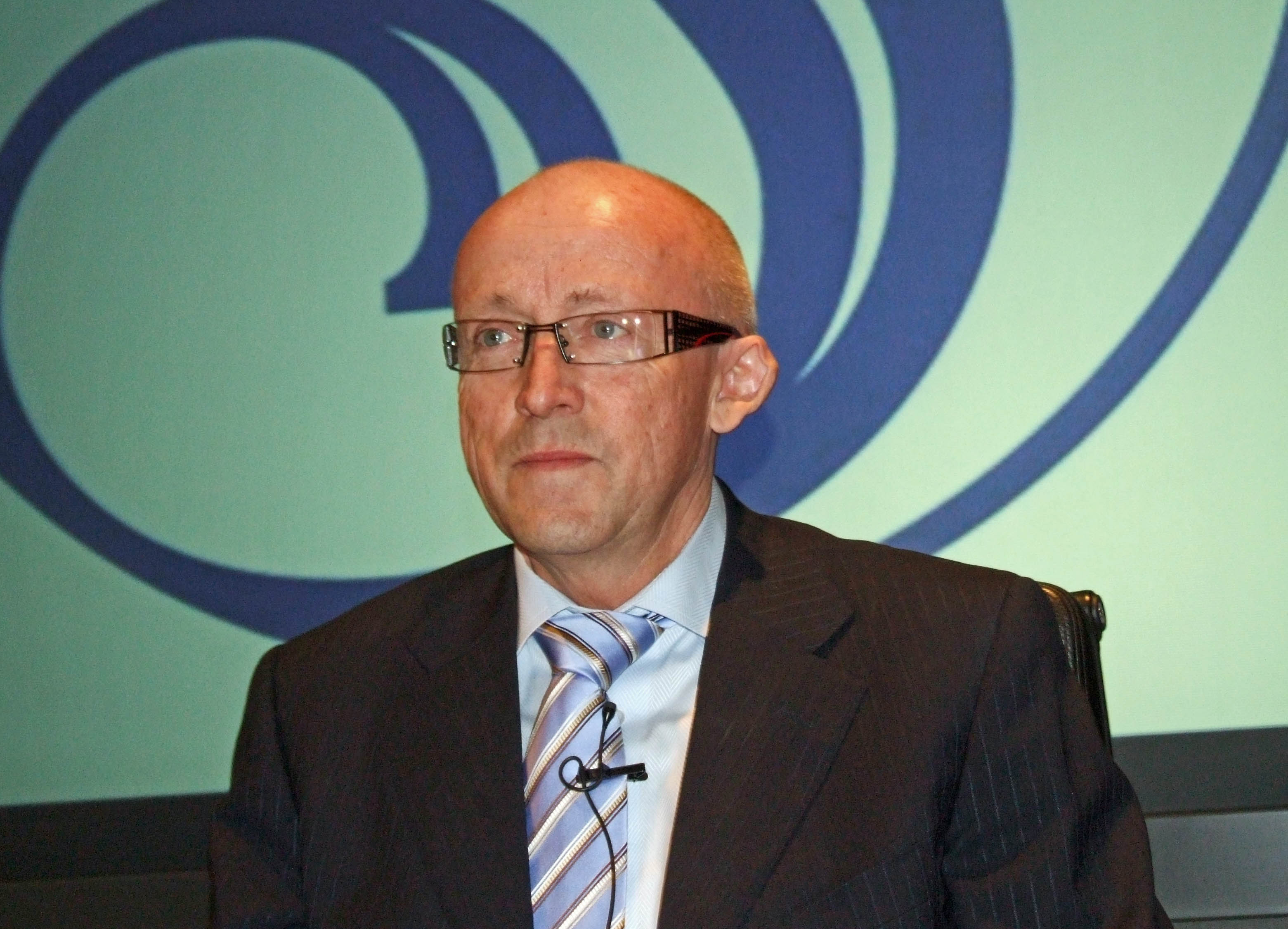
- Born: 7 September 1950 (age 75); Trondheim, Norway
- Education: BI Norwegian Business School
- Occupation: businessperson

Kjell Aamot (born 7 September 1950) is a Norwegian business executive who chaired the Schibsted Media Group for twenty years.

== Career ==
Aamot is educated as economist from the BI Norwegian Business School. He served as Chief Financial Officer of Verdens Gang A-S from 1977 to 1985, and then as its Chief Executive Officer from 1985 to 1989 He has had administrative position in Verdens Gang, and was CEO of Schibsted from 1989 to 2009.
