= Anne Grosvold =

Norwegian journalist

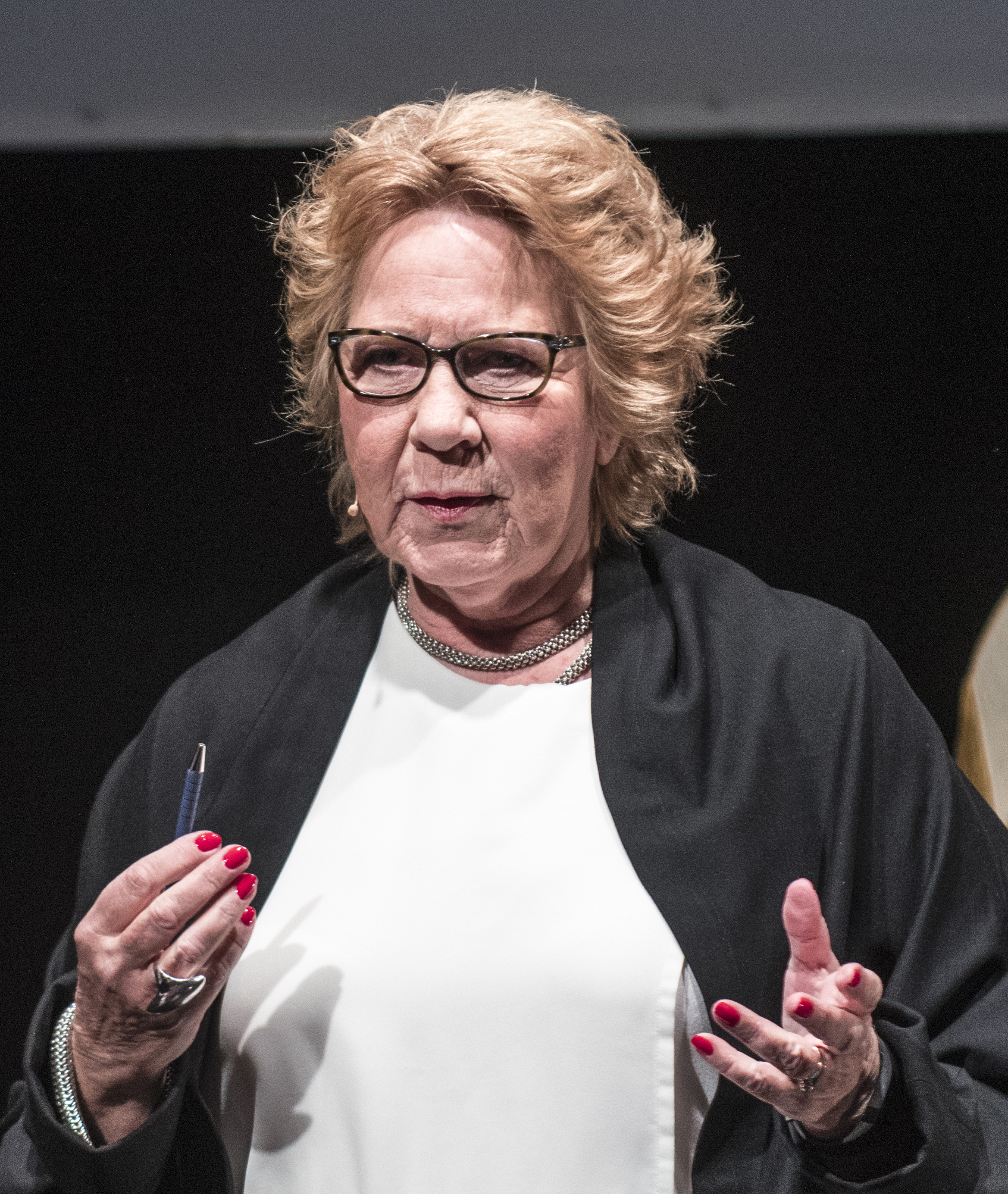
- Born: 7 September 1950 (age 75); Oslo, Norway
- Education: Norsk journalisthøgskole
- Occupation: Journalist
- Awards: Gullruten honorary award (2016)

Anne Merete Grosvold (born 7 September 1950) is a Norwegian journalist, who worked for the Norwegian Broadcasting Corporation (NRK) until her retirement in 2015.

== Biography ==
Born in Oslo on 7 September 1950, Grosvold graduated from the Norsk journalisthøgskole.

She has been correspondent for NRK in Beijing, been talk show hostess, and hosted the current events programs Redaksjon 21 and Dagsnytt 18. She hosted shows such as Bokbadet, Det svakeste ledd, Sommeråpent, and Grosvold.

She was awarded Den Store Journalistprisen by the Norwegian Press Association in 1998.

In 2016 she received the Gullruten honorary award.
