= Morten Krogvold =

Norwegian photographer and writer (born 1950)

- Born: 3 May 1950 (age 75); Oslo, Norway

Morten Krogvold (born 3 May 1950) is a Norwegian photographer and writer. Krogvold is especially known for his portraits of artists, politicians and other celebrities. He has published numerous books, held numerous exhibitions.

== Early life and education ==
Born in Oslo to calculator Gulbrand Leo Krogvold (1908–88) and mother Bodil Jacobsen (1913–88). Krogvold grew up in Lille Langerud in Oslo. At the age of twelve he acquired his own darkroom and became an enthusiastic amateur photographer. He received his professional training as a photographer at the Oslo Vocational School from 1973 to 1974, with Margaret Fosseide as his teacher. He was employed by the National Film Board from 1971 to 1981, a period that formed the basis for his development and interest in art. He captured images of interiors, sculpture, painting and furniture in museums and churches.

== Career ==
At the end of the 1970s Morten Krogvold was active in the League of Free Photographers (FFF). He made his debut exhibition at the first photographic Spring exhibition 1976, he was secretary of the board for a short time, later juror and member of the committee. He attended the exhibition that FFF was presenting its members as guests at Autumn exhibition, and the exhibition Photography Here & Now at the Henie Onstad Art Center, both 1979. The same year he received the Norwegian Government's travel and study grants.

The following year Krogvold as other photographer in history believed in the Autumn Exhibition, when he debuted with the solo exhibition in Norwegian Museum of Photography in Horten Municipality. During the 1980s, he broke with the Association and work increasingly with various assignments in advertising and documentaries. The missions have increasingly taken over and become an integral part of his exhibitions. Several of these are also presented in the book, such as Oslo Pictures in collaboration with Tove Nilsen (1988), or the White House (2000) for NRK.

Morten Krogvold has since the 1980s had a major impact as a teacher in Norway and abroad. Especially at the Academy of Photography at Vågå Municipality he has with his ability to enthuse influenced and inspired numerous photography students. Krogvold was appointed Knight of the Order of St. Olav in 2005 and received an award from Lom Municipality for Culture in 2004.

== Bibliography ==
- 1982: Odd Hilt – Bilder gjennom 50 år (sm.m. H. Koefoed)
- 1983: Portretter/Portrait
- 1986: Det gjelder livet (for Norsk Kreftforening), Oslo
- 1986: Vi som er igjen
- 1988: Oslobilder (sm.m. T. Nilsen)
- 1989: Farmor dør (sm.m. P. Leer-Salvesen)
- 1993: Det avgjørende øyeblikket
- 1995: Du smiler til meg fra et falmet bilde (sm.m. M. Skjelbred)
- 1996: Bilder som speil (sm.m. K. M. Norderval)
- 1996: 100 portretter fra slutten av de første 100 år (for Norsk Filminstitutt)
- 1997: No Barriers (for Kon-Tiki Museet og Telenor)
- 1998: Sånn er eg (sm.m. I. H. Storrusten)
- 1998: Vi som blir igjen. Mennesker i møte med sorgen – og livet som går videre (sm.m. K. Ronge)
- 2000: Mann! Bibelske mannsbilder (sm.m. H. Rem)
- 2000: Det hvite hus (sm.m. S. Sandnes)
- 2000: Helse-Norge 2000 (for Norsk sykepleierforbund)
- 2001: Images
