= Ove Kristian Sundberg =

Norwegian church musician, musicologist, and historian of ideas (1932–2019)

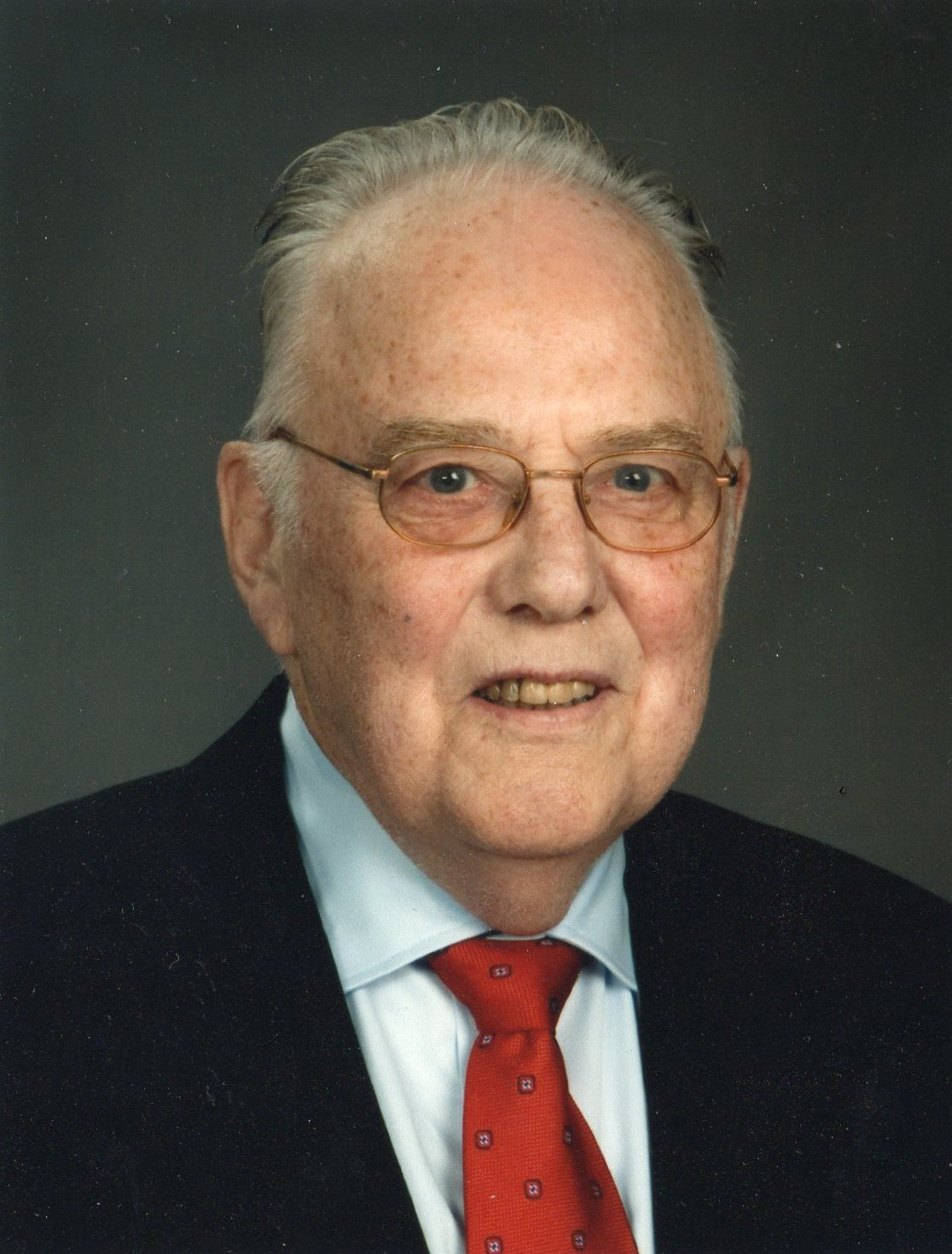
- Born: 22 June 1932; Øksnes, Norway
- Died: 4 February 2019 (aged 86)
- Occupations: Church musician, musicologist and historian of ideas
- Awards: King's Medal of Merit in gold (1997)

Ove Kristian Sundberg (22 June 1932 – 4 February 2019) was a Norwegian church musician, musicologist and historian of ideas.

Sundberg was born in Øksnes Municipality. From 1962 to 1975 he served as organist at the Bodø Cathedral. He was appointed rector at Agder Musikkonservatorium from 1975 to 1976, and was assigned with the University of Oslo from 1979 to 1987. He was appointed professor at the University of Trondheim from 1988 to 1994, and was later professor at the University of Oslo. His publications include Musikk og liturgi from 1971, Pythagoras og de tonende tall from 1980, a monography of Igor Stravinsky from 1983, and three volumes of Musikktenkningens historie (2000–2007). He was awarded the King's Medal of Merit in gold in 1997.

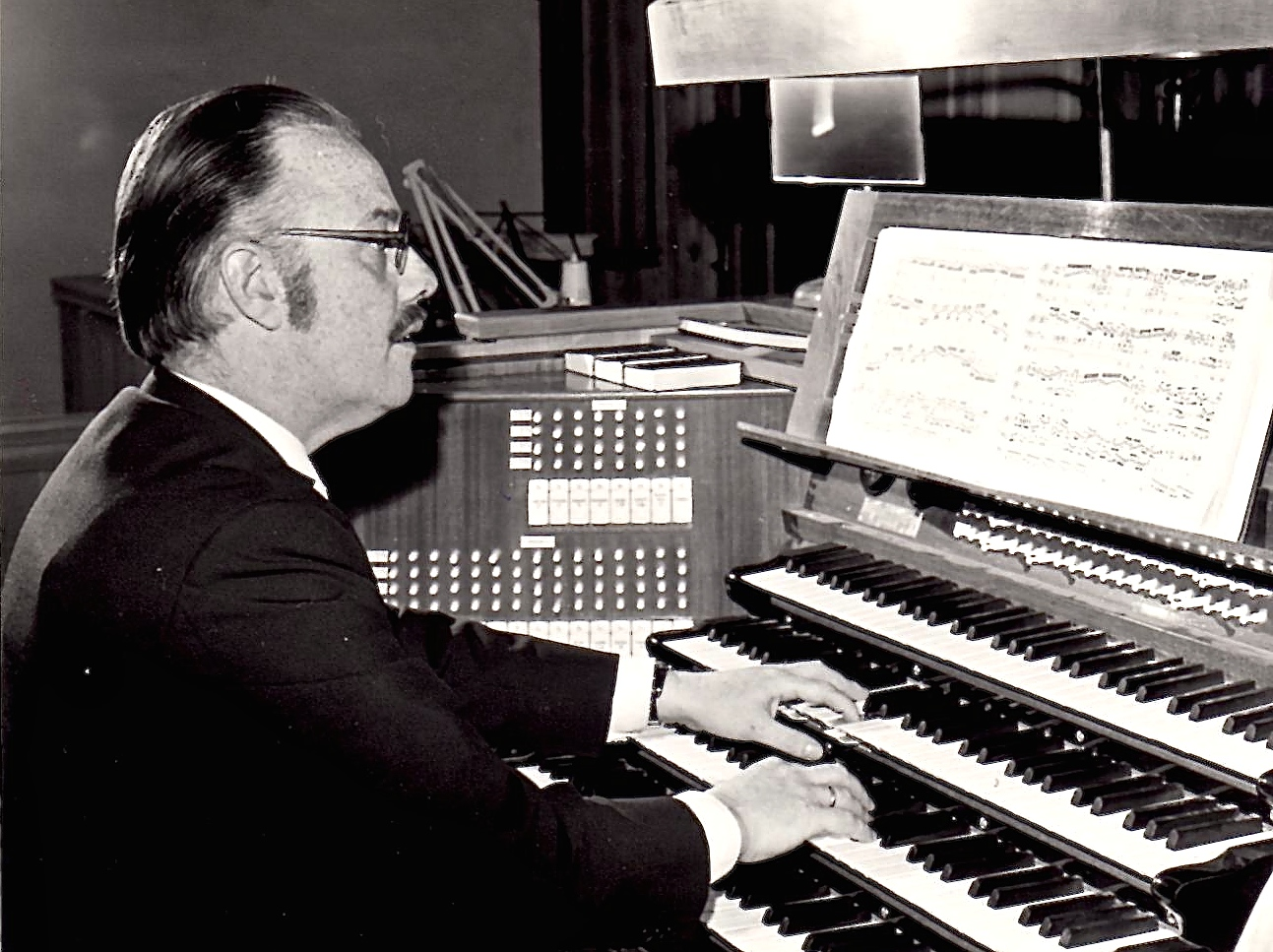
Sundberg at the organ in Bodø Cathedral.
