= Roy Eriksen =

Norwegian literary scholar (1948–2019)

Professor Roy T. Eriksen
- Occupations: Early Modern Scholar and Professor at University of Agder, Norway

Professor Roy T. Eriksen (8 October 1948 – 22 April 2019) was a Norwegian Renaissance scholar and Marlowe scholar teaching at the University of Agder.

== Education and Employment ==
Roy T. Eriksen studied at the University of Oslo with Maren-Sofie Røstvig. He wrote his Ph.D thesis on a structural analysis of Christopher Marlowe’s Doctor Faustus.

Taught at University of Oslo 1977-1986:

- Research Fellow in English Literature, 1977
- Senior Lecturer in Comparative Literature, 1986

Taught at the University of Tromsø 1986-2003

- Professor of English Literature 1986-2003

Professor of Renaissance Studies, at the Norwegian Institute in Rome, 1997-2000 Taught at University of Bergen 1997-1999

- Appointed Professor of English Literature

Taught at University of Agder 2003-2019

- Professor English Renaissance Literature and Culture

Visiting Fellowships

- British Council Fellow, Cambridge University, 1982–1983
- NAVF Research Fellow, Cambridge University, 1986
- Visiting Professor, Villa I Tatti, Florence, 1990–1991, 1994, 1996, 2008
- Universit`s di Padova, Guest Professor 2017

Eriksen was head of the international research group Early Modern Research Group based at the University of Agder. He was general editor of the interdisciplinary journal Early Modern Culture Online and general editor of the bookseries Early Modern and Modern Studies.

Academic Awards

- Eriksen received Agder Academy of Sciences and Letters's award for outstanding research in 2007.

== Festschrift ==
Festschrifts in honor of Eriksen were produced in 1998 and 2008.

- Guest, Clare Lapraik (2008) Rhetoric, theatre and the arts of design : essays presented to Roy Eriksen Oslo: Novus Press

== Publications ==
=== Books ===
- The Forme of Faustus Fortunes. A Study of the Tragedie of Doctor Faustus (1616), 1987, ISBN 0-391-03440-5, 82-560-0416-9
- The Building in the text. Alberti to Shakespeare and Milton, 2001 ISBN 0-271-02022-9
- L'Edifio testuale. Milano; Mimesis, 2014. Revised and expanded translation of The Building in the Text (in collaboration with Penn UP.

=== Translations ===
- Christopher Marlowe, Doktor Faustus: En tragedie (Doctor Faustus: A Tragedy), Solum, 1987
- John Marston, Kurtisanen (The Dutch Courtesan), Solum, 1988
- William Shakespeare, 1 Henrik den fjerde (1 Henry the Fourth), Solum, 1989

=== Edited volumes ===
- Contexts of Pre – Novel Narrative: The European Tradition, 1994
- Contexts of Baroque: Theatre, Metamorphosis, and Design, 1997
- Rhetoric across the Humanities (with Toril Swan), 1999
- Innovation and Tradition: Essays in Renaissance Art and Culture (with Dag T. Andersson), 2000, ISBN 88-7890-384-1
- The Burden of the Ceremony Master (with Staale Sinding-Larsen, 2001
- Ashes to ashes : art in Rome between humanism and maniera (with Victor Plahte Tschudi), 2006, ISBN 978-88-8476-103-3
- Imitation, representation and printing in the Italian Renaissance (with Magne Malmanger), 2009, ISBN 978-88-6227-111-0
