= Gustav Hareide =

Norwegian politician (born 1950)

Gustav Hareide (born 24 January 1950) is a Norwegian politician for the Progress Party.

He served as a deputy representative to the Parliament of Norway from Møre og Romsdal during the terms 1989–1993 and 1997–2001. In total he met during 4 days of parliamentary session.
