= Helga Lie =

Norwegian politician (1930–2019)

Helga Lie (24 June 1930 – 23 June 2019) was a Norwegian politician for the Conservative Party.

She served as a deputy representative to the Parliament of Norway from Vest-Agder during the term 1981–1985. In total she met during 51 days of parliamentary session. Hailing from Lierne Municipality, she moved to Vennesla Municipality with her husband in 1962. In 1969 she campaigned for the first kindergarten in Vennesla. She was a member of the municipal council of Vennesla Municipality and as deputy mayor there. She also served on the Vest-Agder county council.
