= Beate Ellingsen =

Norwegian interior designer and furniture designer

Beate Ellingsen (born 28 October 1950 in Oslo) is a Norwegian interior designer and furniture designer.

== Biography ==
Ellingsen graduated in interior architecture and furniture design from the Norwegian School of Crafts and Art in 1957. She worked for the architecture firm Lund & Slaatto from 1978 to 1988 where she essentially handled interior design. She worked on the interiors of the Norges Bank's buildings.

In 1988, she opened her own design firm. She decorated Norwegian embassies, including the ones in Kyiv and Berlin. She worked on the redesign of the Oslo Courthouse (52 courtrooms with slightly different designs to experiment with legal sociology and interior design) in 1994, the Halden Prison in 2010 and the National Theatre in 2015. She also worked on the University of Oslo's Georg Sverdrup House, and the west wing of its Domus Media
