= Jon Østeng Hov =

Norwegian photographer and writer (1936–2019)

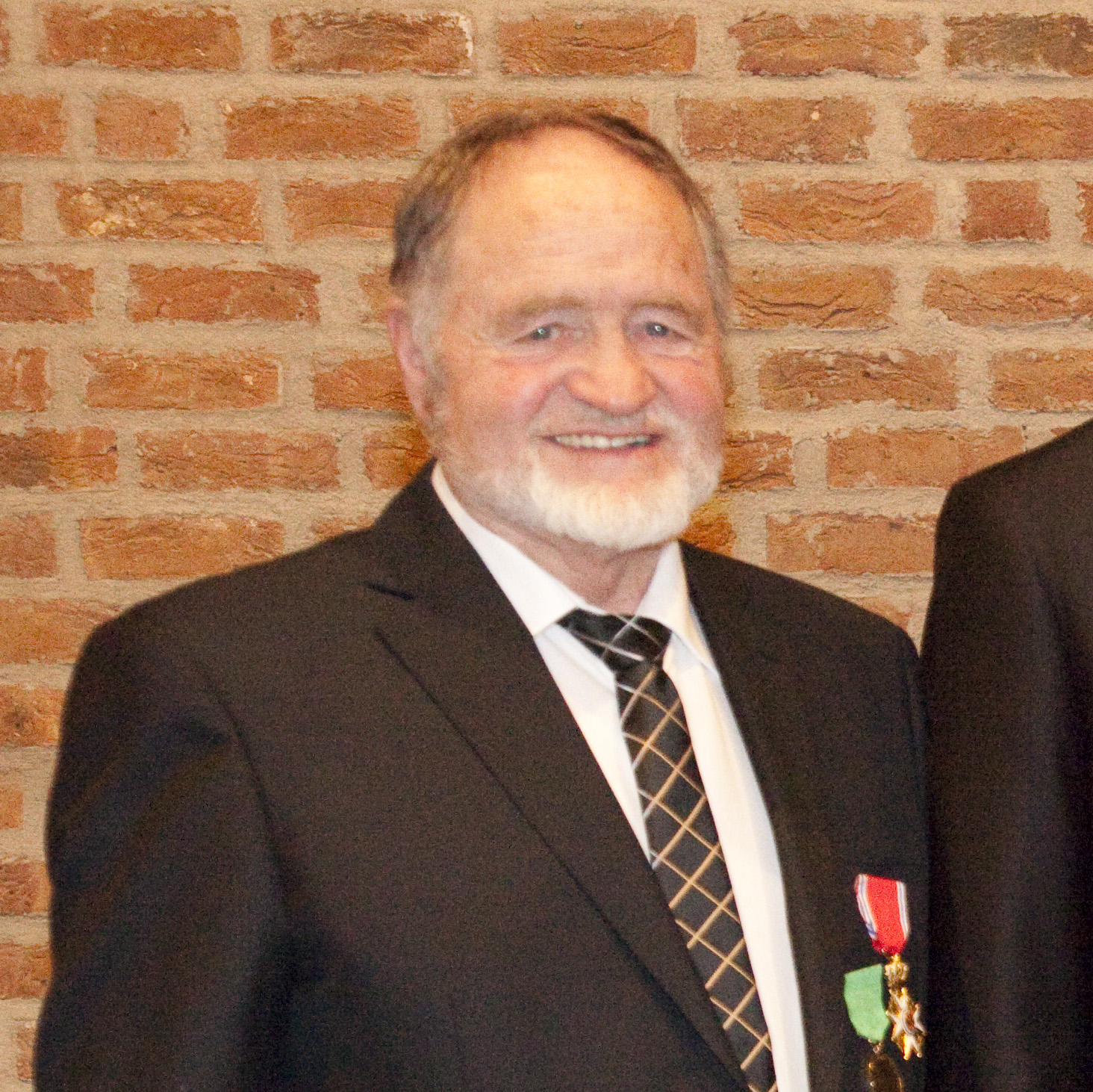
- Hov in March 2010
- Born: 23 January 1936
- Died: 29 March 2019 (aged 83)
- Occupations: Photographer; writer
- Awards: Order of St. Olav (2005)

Jon Østeng Hov (23 January 1936 − 29 March 2019) was a Norwegian photographer and writer. He was particularly known for his flower photos, and was a columnist in Adresseavisen for over thirty years.

Hov was an honorary member of the Norwegian Society for the Conservation of Nature, and was decorated Knight, First Class of the Order of St. Olav in 2005.
