= Svanhild Salberg =

Norwegian politician (1932–2019)

Svanhild Salberg (3 July 1932 – 27 June 2019) was a Norwegian politician for the Centre Party. Hailing from Skatval, she was a prolific contributor to the local revue scene. She was a member of the municipal council and Nord-Trøndelag county council.

She served as a deputy representative to the Parliament of Norway from Nord-Trøndelag during the terms 1977–1981 and 1981–1985. In total, she met during 83 days of parliamentary session.
