= Knut Kaasen =

Norwegian legal scholar

Knut Kaasen (born 9 November 1951) is a Norwegian legal scholar.

He was born in Harstad, and graduated from the University of Oslo with the cand.jur. degree in 1977. He worked as a deputy judge from 1979 to 1981, was an associate professor in maritime law at the University of Oslo from 1981 to 1984 and took his dr.juris degree in 1984. He worked as a lawyer in Norsk Hydro from 1984 to 1988, and then returned to the University of Oslo as a professor of jurisprudence. He was the dean of the Faculty of Law from 2001 to 2003.

He has also been an acting Supreme Court Justice, and is the current board chairman of Lovdata.

Academic offices
Preceded by Frederik Zimmer	Dean of the Faculty of Law, University of Oslo; 2001–2003	Succeeded by Jon T. Johnsen
