= Anne Margrethe Larsen =

Norwegian politician

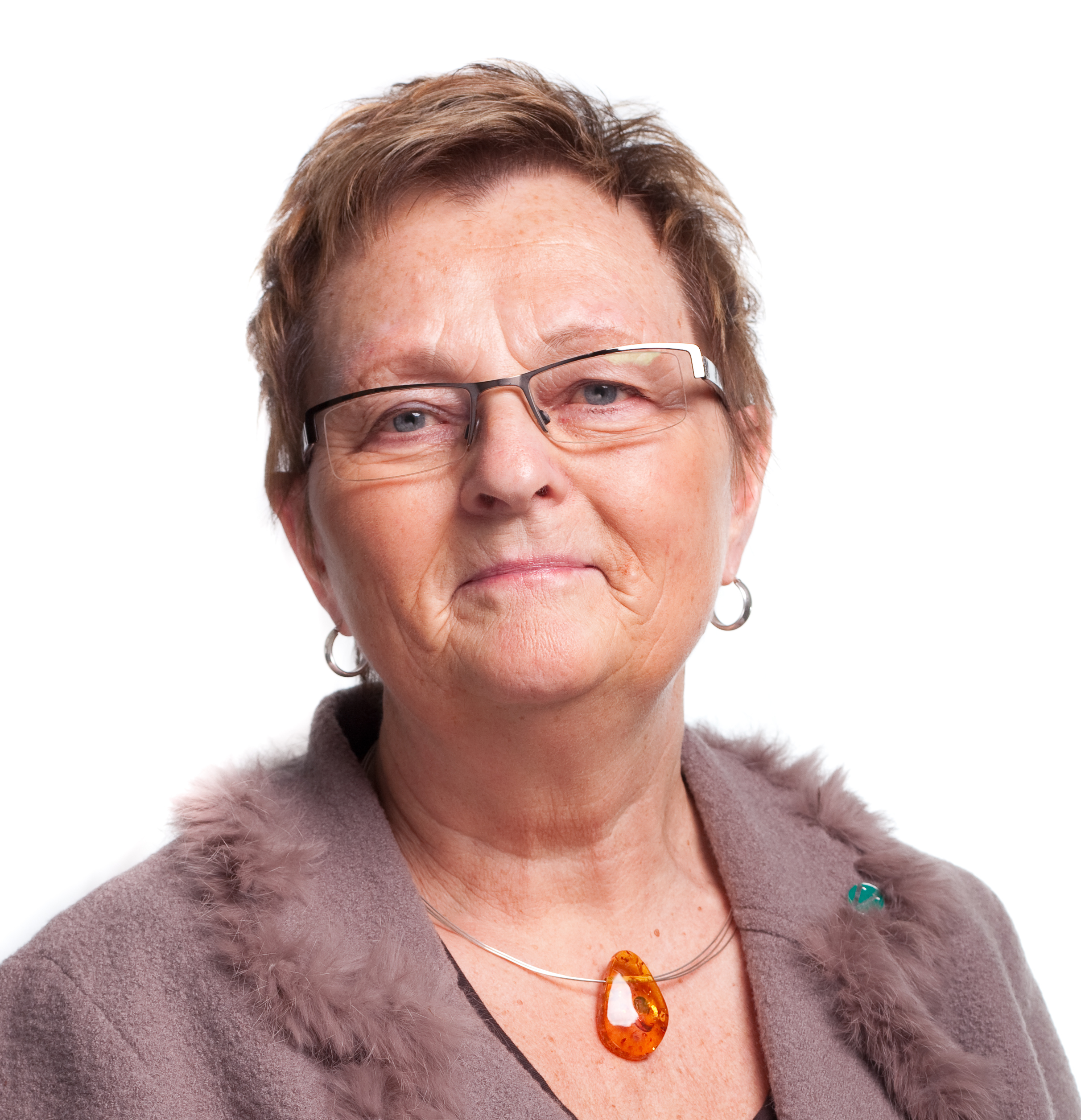
Anne Margrethe Larsen

Anne Margrethe Larsen (born 28 May 1950, in Haugesund) is a Norwegian politician representing the Liberal Party. She is currently a representative of Vest-Agder in the Storting and was first elected in 2005.

== Storting committees ==
- 2005–2009 member of the Foreign Affairs committee.
- 2005–2009 member of the Extended Foreign Affairs committee.
- 2005–2009 reserve member of the Electoral committee.
