= Erla Bergendahl Hohler =

Norwegian art historian and professor

Erla Bergendahl Hohler FSA
- Born: 20 November 1937; Oslo, Norway
- Died: 9 June 2019 (aged 81)
- Occupations: Academic; Archaeologist; Art Historian

Erla Karine Bergendahl Hohler FSA (20 November 1937 – 9 June 2019) was a Norwegian archaeologist, museum curator, and art historian.

== Career ==
Hohler graduated from the University of Oslo before attending the Courtauld Institute in London. In 1975 she was assistant professor at the Institute of Art History at the University of Oslo. In 1987 she became Keeper of the Medieval Department at the University Museum of National Antiquities. In 1993 she became Professor of the Department of Archaeology, Art History and Numismatics before, in 1994, moving to the University of Tromsø as Professor of Art History.

Hohler was elected a Fellow of the Society of Antiquaries of London in January 1991 and a member of the Norwegian Academy of Science and Letters in 1994.

== Select publications ==
- Hohler, E. B. 1981. "The Sogn-Valdres Design", in Borg, A. and Martindale, A. (eds) The Vanishing Past: Studies of Medieval Art, Liturgy and Metrology presented to Christopher Hohler (BAR International Series 111). Oxford, British Archaeological Report: 63-88.
- Hohler, E. B. 1989. Norwegian Stave Church Carving.
- Hohler, E. B. 1999. Norwegian Stave Church Sculpture.
- Hohler, E. B., Morgan, N. J., and Wichstrøm, A. 2004. Painted altar frontals of Norway, 1250-1350.
- Hohler, E. B. 2008. "The Re-engraved Matrix: Bishop versus Chapter in Nidaros around 1300", in Adams, N., Cheery, J., and Robinson, J. (eds) Good Impressions. Image and Authority in Medieval Seals. London: 77-80.
