= Jan Petter Collier =

Norwegian stockbroker (born 1950)

- Born: 30 June 1950 (age 76); Oslo, Norway
- Education: University of Fribourg
- Occupations: Stockbroker, investor

Jan Petter Collier (born 30 June 1950) is a Norwegian stockbroker and investor, a co-founder and majority owner of ABG Sundal Collier.

== Career ==
Born on 30 June 1950, Collier is educated economist from the University of Fribourg. Having worked for various banks, Collier established his own stockbroking company in 1983.

He was head of the investment bank ABG Sundal Collier until 2010, when Knut Brundtland took over as chief executive, while Collier continued as advisor and chairman of the board.

As of 2024, Collier is the largest owner of ABG Sundal Collier. In 2023 he was listed on the magazine Kapital's list of the 400 wealthiest people in Norway.

An art collector, Collier is the owner of a significant collection of Nordic contemporary art, which is among the largest private art collections in Norway.
