= Else Kollerud Furre =

Norwegian politician (1922–2019)

Else Kollerud Furre, née Saxegaard (12 August 1922 – 5 August 2019) was a Norwegian politician for the Conservative Party.

She served as a deputy representative to the Parliament of Norway from Akershus during the term 1958–1961. In total she met during 4 days of parliamentary session. Born at Hemnes Municipality, she was the first woman elected to the municipal council for Søndre Høland Municipality. She was married three times.
