= Sigrid Sollund =

Norwegian journalist and author

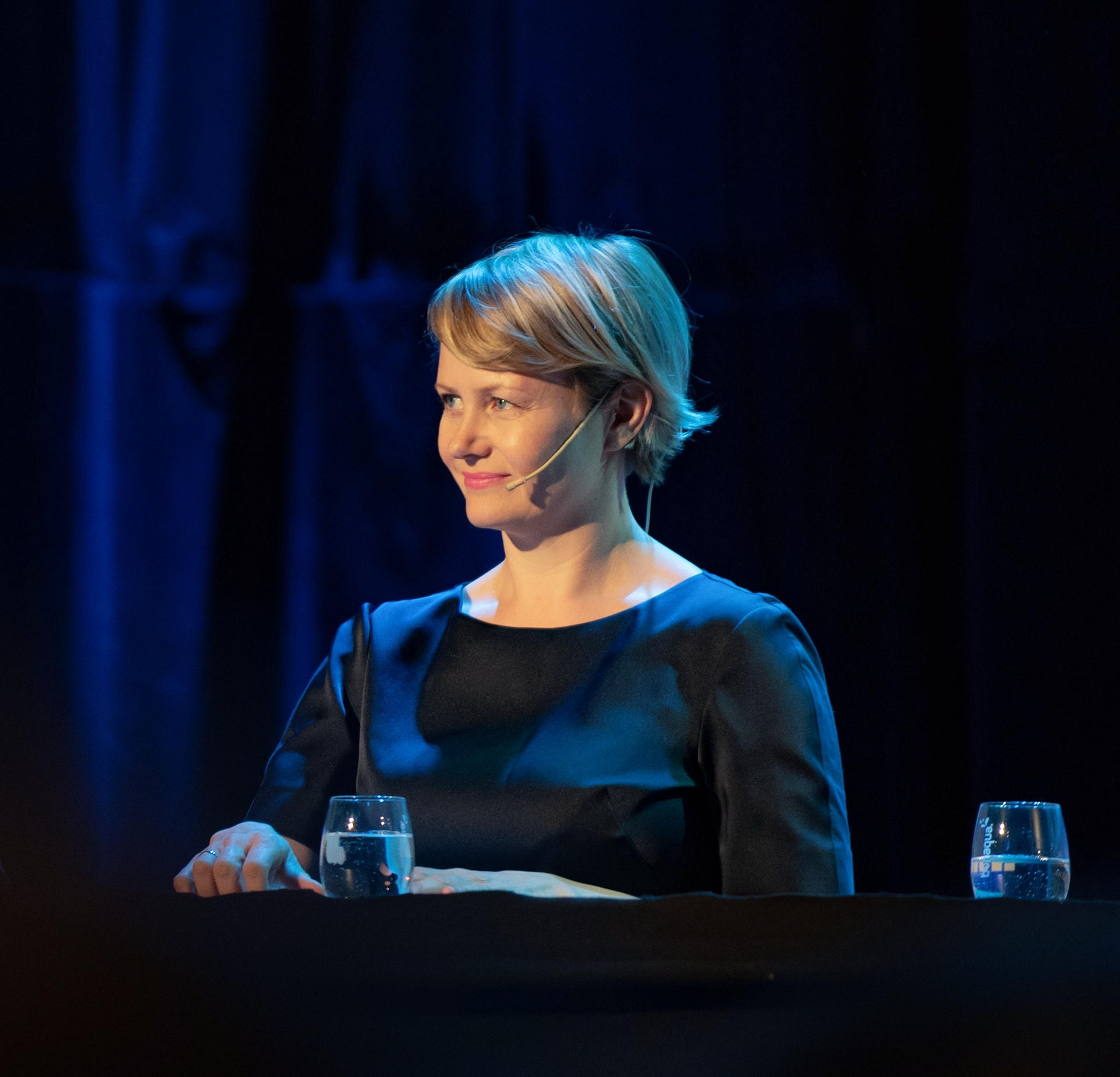
- Born: 1976
- Citizenship: Norway
- Education: Volda University College; University of Oslo
- Occupations: journalist; author; television presenter

Sigrid Elise Sollund (born 1976) is a Norwegian journalist and author, best known from her role as presenter in Dagsnytt 18.

== Biography ==
Sollund grew up in Skullerud, Oslo and has studied psychology at the University of Oslo, product design at the Oslo and Akershus University College and journalism at the Volda University College. She first came to NRK for an internship in Østlandssendingen, and then worked in NRK Alltid nyheter, in P2 and in NRK2. She has been a reporter and presenter for Politisk kvarter and Ukeslutt, and has also led party leader interviews at several parliamentary elections and the debate program Dagsnytt Atten.

In 2017, Sollund published the book Hersketeknikker: Nyttige og nådeløse (English: Mastery Techniques: Useful and Merciless), which deals with the use of rule techniques in politics, the media, family and working life. In 2019, she published Skikk og bruk. Praktisk folkeskikk for moderne mennesker (English: Custom. Practical customs for modern people).

In 2020, Sollund was awarded the Lytterprisen by the Riksmål Society for "transl. her good, precise, effective and often playful language" on Dagsnytt 18. She was nominated for the Gullruten 2021 in the category best presenter - news, sports or current affairs, also for Dagsnytt 18.
