= Ansgar Torvik =

Norwegian physician (1925–2019)

Ansgar Torvik (9 June 1925 – 18 August 2019) was a Norwegian physician.

He was born in Lesja Municipality and finished his secondary education in 1945. He took the dr.med. degree at the University of Oslo in 1958. He also studied in Sweden, and was a research fellow at Massachusetts General Hospital and Harvard Medical School. He was assistant chief physician at Ullevål Hospital, docent and professor of neuropathology at the University of Oslo. He was a fellow of the Norwegian Academy of Science and Letters.
