= Dagfinn Stenseth =

Norwegian diplomat (1936–2019)

Dagfinn Stenseth (28 August 1936 – 26 July 2019) was a Norwegian diplomat.

He was born in Øvre Eiker, and had a bachelor's degree in political science. He was hired in the Ministry of Foreign Affairs in 1962, and was promoted to assistant secretary in 1973, sub-director in 1976 and deputy under-secretary of state in 1986. He served as the Norwegian ambassador to the Soviet Union from 1979 to 1985, to Russia from 1990 to 1994, to Finland from 1994 to 1997 and to Denmark from 1999 to 2004. In between he was a special adviser in the Ministry of Foreign Affairs from 1997 to 1999.

Dagfinn Stenseth had a wife, with whom he had two children, model Tina Marie Stenseth, and Paula Joanne Stenseth.

Diplomatic posts
Preceded by Petter Graver	Norwegian ambassador to the Soviet Union; 1979–1985	Succeeded by Olav Bucher Johannessen
Preceded by Olav Bucher Johannessen	Norwegian ambassador to Russia; 1990–1994	Succeeded by Per Tresselt
