= Leidulv Namtvedt =

Norwegian diplomat

Leidulv Namtvedt (born 1 October 1950) is a Norwegian diplomat.

He is a Candidatus/Candidata Magisterii by education. He started working for the Norwegian Ministry of Foreign Affairs in 1976, and served as embassy counsellor in Russia from 1991 to 1995. He returned to the Ministry of Foreign Affairs in 1996 and served as deputy under-secretary of state from 1999 to 2006. Newspaper Dagens Næringsliv described it as "one of the most powerful and influential positions a person can hold in the Ministry of Foreign Affairs". From 2007 he was the Norwegian ambassador to Finland. In 2009 he unsuccessfully applied for the position as Norwegian ambassador to the United Kingdom. After a period in the Ministry of Foreign Affairs as head of department from 2012 he became the Norwegian ambassador to Russia from 2013 to 2018.

Diplomatic posts
Preceded by Knut Hauge	Norwegian ambassador to Russia; 2013–2018	Succeeded by Rune Resaland
