= Inga Magistad =

Norwegian diplomat (born 1950)

Inga Magistad (born 4 August 1950) is a Norwegian diplomat.

She is a cand.mag. by education, and started working for the Norwegian Ministry of Foreign Affairs in 1978. She served as sub-director in the Ministry of Foreign Affairs from 1996 to 1997, and was the Norwegian ambassador to the Philippines from 1997 to 2000. After six years as an advisor in the Ministry of Foreign Affairs, she served as the Norwegian ambassador to Portugal from 2006 o 2011. Another two years as an advisor followed, before being appointed ambassador to Slovakia in 2013.

== Honours ==
- Portugal: Grand Cross of the Order of Prince Henry (26 May 2008)
- Portugal: Grand Cross of the Order of Merit (22 July 2011)
