= Tomm Kristiansen =

Norwegian author and journalist (1950–2022)

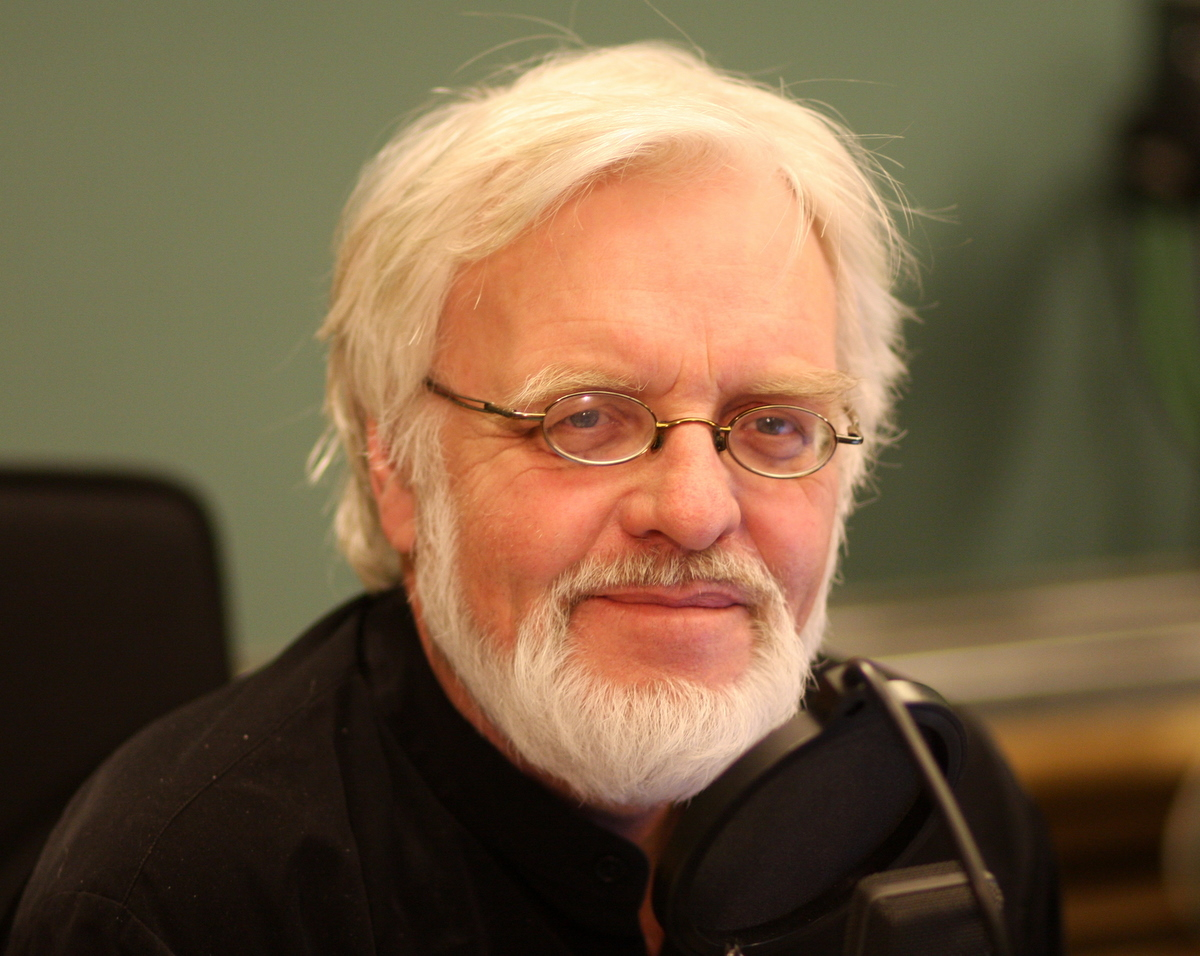
- Born: 22 January 1950; Eidsberg, Norway
- Died: 6 November 2022 (aged 72)
- Occupation(s): Journalist, foreign correspondent, anchor-man and senior advisor

Tomm Kristiansen (22 January 1950 – 6 November 2022) was a Norwegian author and journalist, known for his work as foreign news correspondent for the Norwegian Broadcasting Corporation (NRK). Amongst Norwegians he is known as "the voice from Africa", through his job as news correspondent, based in Harare 1990–1994 and Cape Town 2002–2006. He has been host of numerous radio and TV programs in Norway.

After two years as adviser to Salva Kiir, the president of South Sudan, Kristiansen was Communications Officer for ACT Alliance by World Council of Churches in Geneva from 2006 to 2008.

Kristiansen openly criticized the United Nations system for being inefficient in the South-Sudan conflict. He has introduced "constructive journalism" as a tool for changing journalist's work in a solution oriented direction.

Kristiansen was married to the South African Sharon Coetzee and lived both in Oslo and Cape Town. He died on 6 November 2022, at the age of 72.
