= Wenche Kvamme =

Norwegian singer and actress (1950–2019)

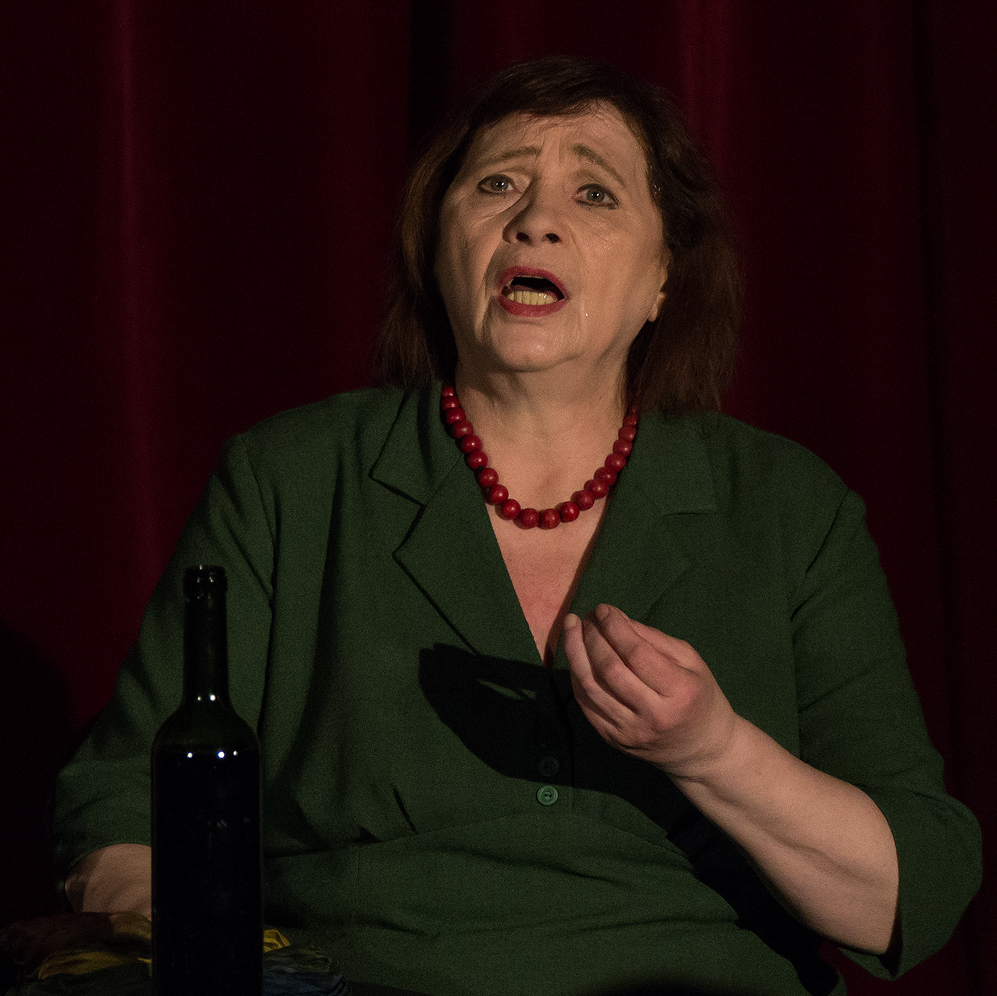
- Kvamme in 2017
- Born: 19 June 1950; Bergen, Norway
- Died: 9 March 2019 (aged 68); Bergen, Norway
- Education: Norwegian National Academy of Theatre
- Occupations: Singer and actress

Wenche Kvamme (19 June 1950 – 9 March 2019) was a Norwegian singer and actress.

== Career ==
Kvamme was born in Bergen, and was educated at the Norwegian National Academy of Theatre.

She made her stage début at Nationaltheatret in 1977, in an adaptation of Georg Büchner's play Danton's Death. She was appointed at the Bergen theatre Den Nationale Scene in 1978, where she worked most of her career. Her participation in television shows include Fedrelandet (1991), Offshore (1996–2000), and Holms (2002–2003).

Kvamme was awarded the Pernillestatuetten in 1990.

She died in Bergen on 9 March 2019, aged 68.
