= List of Grini prisoners =

This is a list of prisoners of Grini concentration camp, which was operated in Nazi-occupied Norway between 1941 and 1945.

A cross symbol next to a name denotes that the person died during World War II, at Grini or elsewhere.

| Name | Prisoner number |
|---|---|
| Ernst Ancher-Hanssen | 6563 |
| Johannes Andenæs | 9206 |
| Arne Andersen | 15201 |
| Johan H. Andresen | 1313 |
| Richard Andvord | 16497 |
| Richard Andvord | 2767 |
| Nils Anker | 17197 |
| Christian Anker-Larsen | 18515 |
| Carl Jacob Arnholm | 9205 |
| Reidar Aulie | 17387 |
| Kristian Bakken | 9549 |
| Per Bang | 7174 |
| Erling Bauck | 7775 |
| Carl Severin Bentzen | 13993 |
| Erling Bentzen | 719 |
| Lars Berg | 7355 |
| Endre Berner | 9216 |
| Jørgen H. Berner | 737 |
| Henriette Bie Lorentzen | 12684 |
| Olaf Bjerke | 861 |
| Ingrid Bjerkås | 9327 |
| Hans Johan Bjørnstad | 60 |
| Rolf Bloch Hansen | 3625 |
| Aslaug Blytt | 7513 |
| Johnny Bode | 5803 |
| Kjell Bondevik | 2110 |
| Johan Borgen | 496 |
| Olav Brænden | 14054 |
| Gunnar Bratlie | 6531 |
| Trygve Bratteli | 4533 |
| Alex Brinchmann | 17681 |
| Georg Brochmann | 16961 |
| Jonas Brunvoll, Sr. | 3570; 5415 |
| Jonas Brunvoll, Jr. | 1685 |
| Kirsten Brunvoll | 1438 |
| Alf Bonnevie Bryn | 979 |
| Anton Wilhelm Brøgger | 804 |
| Niels Christian Brøgger | 5303 |
| Waldemar Christofer Brøgger | 757 |
| Osmund Brønnum † | 7493 |
| Gunnar Christian Brøvig | 11073 |
| Gunnar Bråthen | 1620; 17029 |
| Odd Bue | 4891 |
| Erling Bühring-Dehli | 2049 |
| Ludvik Buland † | 634 |
| Brynjulf Bull | 5929 |
| Edvard Bull, Jr. | 1835 |
| Francis Bull | 480 |
| Trygve Bull | 7539 |
| Leif Bjorholt Burull | 16884 |
| Kristian Lerche Bøckman | 11728 |
| Nils Christoffer Bøckmann | 10334 |
| Henning Bødtker | 658 |
| Johannes Sejersted Bødtker | 479 |
| Gunnar Bøe | 3555 |
| Lise Børsum | 7438 |
| Andreas Zeier Cappelen | 17274 |
| Johan Cappelen | 18723 |
| Johan Zeier Cappelen | 17950 |
| Andreas Claussen | 4052 |
| Christian A. R. Christensen | 3143; 12667 |
| Johan Collett | 11979 |
| Olav Dalgard | 3113 |
| Bjarne Dalland † | 5398 |
| Halfdan Gyth Dehli | 1303 |
| Jan Didriksen | 3554 |
| Halfdan Ditlev-Simonsen | 1312 |
| John Ditlev-Simonsen | 7449 |
| Olaf Christian Ditlev-Simonsen | 1274 |
| Nils Juell Dybwad | 806 |
| Ernst Fredrik Eckhoff | 8113 |
| Johan Einarsen | 3536 |
| Gunvald Engelstad | 14287 |
| Rolv Werner Erichsen | 14723 |
| Andreas Eriksen | 9905 |
| Sigurd Evensmo | 1747; 2755 |
| Osmund Faremo | 6399 |
| Knut Fixdal | 3247 |
| Kristian Fjeld | 4393 |
| Jack Fjeldstad | 15159 |
| Sten Waldemar Florelius | 3624 |
| Karsten Fonstad | 17757 |
| Leif O. Foss | 669 |
| Olav Foss | 10921 |
| Jon Fossum | 6672 |
| Ole Hannibal Fossum | 6667 |
| Paul Christian Frank | 655; 11823 |
| Halvdan Wexelsen Freihow | 7650 |
| Einar Friele † | 12630 |
| Ragnar Frisch | 9213 |
| Bjørn Føyn | 9214 |
| Elias Gabrielsen | 8457 |
| Hans Gabrielsen | 2780 |
| Knut Gard | 1282; 3142 |
| Pola Gauguin | 782 |
| Einar Gauslaa | 7478 |
| Einar Gerhardsen | 660 |
| Olaf Gjerløw | 700 |
| Klaus Gjøstein | 1767 |
| Tjalve Gjøstein | 17602 |
| John Godwin | 8007 |
| Rowland Greenberg | 16002 |
| Anita Greve | 3312 |
| Harald Grieg | 478 |
| Sigurd Grieg | 11044 |
| Alf Grindrud | 11482 |
| Henrik Groth | 10206 |
| Odd Grythe | 19255 |
| Torstein Grythe | 9174 |
| Per Græsli † | 4215; 7090 |
| Ingeborg Refling Hagen | 1206 |
| Egil Halle | 16647 |
| Ole Hallesby | 7666 |
| Asbjørn Halvorsen | 4058 |
| Odd Harsheim | 3002 |
| Odd Hassel | 9212 |
| Mons Haukeland | 9193 |
| Trond Hegna | 2827 |
| Axel Heiberg | 15129 |
| Gustav Adolf Lammers Heiberg | 2641 |
| Hans Heiberg | 19698 |
| Erling Heiestad | 12833 |
| Anatol Heintz | 9211 |
| Olaf Helset | 772 |
| Torbjørn Henriksen | 580 |
| Johan Bernhard Hjort | 1133; 1423 |
| Trygve Jacob Broch Hoff | 2637 |
| Rolf Hofmo | 1680 |
| Ludvig Hope | 7665 |
| Julius Hougen | 6031 |
| Alfhild Hovdan | 358 |
| Petter Hugsted | 16503 |
| Hans L. C. Huitfeldt | 1387 |
| Henrik Jørgen Schibsted Huitfeldt | 1297 |
| Nils Hønsvald | 160; 16523 |
| Johan Haanes | 2445 |
| Gunnar Haarstad | 17702 |
| Helge Haavind | 17659 |
| Thor Haavind | 15978 |
| Oscar Ihlebæk † | 7595 |
| Joakim Ihlen | 16405 |
| Anker Iversen | 14616 |
| Arne Jostein Ingebrethsen † | 12338 |
| Gunnar Jahn | 16366 |
| Carl Johan Frederik Jakhelln | 318 |
| Per Jacobsen | 4077 |
| Eskild Jensen | 3319 |
| Jorunn Johnsen | 9575 |
| Alexander Lange Johnson | 10201 |
| Bjarne Jullum | 656 |
| Thorleif Karlsen | 76; 12750 |
| Alv Kjøs | 2872 |
| Knut Kleve | 6828 |
| Knud Christian Knudsen | 16496 |
| Arnholdt Kongsgaard | 6343 |
| Per Krogh | 2634 |
| Olaf Kullmann † | 346 |
| Reidar Kvammen | 12743 |
| Per Kviberg | 17366 |
| Håkon Kyllingmark | 63 |
| August Lange | 840 |
| Thora Manthey Lange | 12869 |
| Fredrik Lange-Nielsen | 1453 |
| Knut Langfeldt | 11786 |
| Nils Langhelle | 7593 |
| Erik Sture Larre | 8093; 10165 |
| Gunnar Alf Larsen | 495 |
| Olav Larssen | 2751 |
| Josef Larsson | 599 |
| Arne Laudal | 6032 |
| Kari Lauring | 19027 |
| Kolbein Lauring | 4464 |
| Ottar Lie † | 6612 |
| Per Lie † | 4519 |
| Odd Lien | 473 |
| Odd Lindbäck-Larsen | 2768 |
| Adolf Fridtjof Lindvik | 2627 |
| Olai Lorange | 3525 |
| Anders A. Lothe | 7522 |
| Bernt H. Lund | 3320 |
| S. H. Lundh | 1594 |
| Bjørn Lyng | 14235 |
| Herman Løvenskiold | 3241 |
| Sverre Marstrander | 954 |
| Sigrid Maseng | 17183 |
| Sam Melberg | 8935 |
| Lars Magnus Moen | 1130 |
| Olav Moen | 3535 |
| Marie Lous Mohr | 5912 |
| Otto Lous Mohr | 803 |
| Erling Moi | 11220 |
| Josef Monsrud | 5302 |
| Georg Valentin von Munthe af Morgenstierne | 10717 |
| August Mowinckel-Nilsen | 16825 |
| Abelone Møgster | 6185 |
| Arnt Mørland | 11696 |
| Kristian Mugaas | 1734 |
| Leifur Muller | 6041 |
| Peter A. Munch | 9430 |
| Odd Nansen | 1380 |
| Thorvald Narvestad | 597 |
| Gustav Natvig-Pedersen | 2104 |
| Rasmus Navelsaker | 17902 |
| Otto Nielsen | 8648 |
| Sivert Andreas Nielsen | 320 |
| Oscar Nilssen | 18847 |
| Bernt A. Nissen | 781 |
| Birgit Nissen † | 7947 |
| Tor Njaa † | 6968 |
| Jon Ola Norbom | 2992 |
| Knut Nordanger | 2699 |
| Ingjald Nordstad | 10855 |
| Edmund Norén | 5668 |
| Rudolf Næss | 5668 |
| Sven Oftedal | 196 |
| Arthur Omre | 9900 |
| Kristian Ottosen | 4377 |
| Anton Peters | 11809 |
| Carl Platou | 4519 |
| Moritz Rabinowitz † | 79 |
| Cato Rachlew | 1307 |
| Fredrik Ramm | 699 |
| Nils Ramm | 1299 |
| Ingjald Reichborn-Kjennerud, Jr. | 17380 |
| Egil Reksten | 8197 |
| Hans Julius Riddervold | 1385 |
| Robert Riefling | 5738 |
| Frode Rinnan | 382; 12772 |
| Carl Fridtjof Rode | 2429 |
| Sigurd Roll † | 1175 |
| Asbjørn Ruud | 6664 |
| Birger Ruud | 6663 |
| Sigmund Ruud | 6619 |
| Albert Raaen | 585 |
| Rudolf Falck Ræder | 10895 |
| Ørnulf Rød | 2635 |
| Olaf Røgeberg | 12663 |
| Willy Røgeberg | 4776 |
| Arnold Rørholt | 2644 |
| Arnold Rørholt | 2735 |
| Salve Andreas Salvesen | 6862 |
| Sylvia Salvesen | 1404 |
| Lauritz Sand | 796; 927; 9844 |
| Johannes Henrik Schiøtz | 1383 |
| Daisy Schjelderup | 762 |
| Harald Krabbe Schjelderup | 9210 |
| Kristian Schjelderup | 4352 |
| Johan Schreiner | 9209 |
| Kristian Emil Schreiner | 662 |
| Mentz Schulerud | 16374 |
| Harald Schwenzen | 9375 |
| Alf Scott-Hansen | 2638 |
| Didrik Arup Seip | 805 |
| Gudmund Seland | 13083 |
| Arne Serck-Hanssen | 3324 |
| Klaus Serck-Hanssen | 8030; 19129 |
| Gustav Sjaastad | 10860 |
| Helge Skappel | 353 |
| Eiliv Skard | 9208 |
| Einar Skavlan | 2363 |
| Olaf Skramstad | 904 |
| Vegard Sletten | 11370 |
| Harald Slåttelid † | 3384 |
| Nils Slaatto | 784 |
| Herman Smitt-Ingebretsen | 8149 |
| Evald O. Solbakken | 2746 |
| Olaf Solumsmoen | 2756 |
| Nic. Stang | 2773 |
| Erling Steen | 670 |
| Hjalmar Steenstrup | 12850 |
| Asgaut Steinnes | 14876 |
| Martin Strandli | 2330 |
| Christian Stray | 10198 |
| Bjarne Aagaard Strøm | 4834 |
| Gunvald Strøm-Walseng | 16501 |
| Johannes Stubberud | 475 |
| Olav Sæter | 6291 |
| Lars Sæther | 4905 |
| Iacob Dybwad Sømme † | 5235 |
| Haakon Sørbye | 5955 |
| Henrik Sørensen | 17397 |
| Halvor Sørum | 5891 |
| Jens Tangen | 596 |
| Carsten Tank-Nielsen | 1308 |
| Wilhelm Thagaard | 2764 |
| Marguerite Thoresen | 15557 |
| Frithjof Tidemand-Johannessen | 3460 |
| Haakon Tranberg | 16169 |
| Johan Nicolay Tønnessen | 15012 |
| Roar Tønseth | 10350 |
| Neri Valen | 8884 |
| Fartein Valen-Sendstad | 9989 |
| Harry Vestli † | 704 |
| Jørgen Vogt | N/A |
| Nils Vogt | 7966 |
| Jakob Vaage | 1998 |
| Olaf Watnebryn | 13150 |
| Kristian Welhaven | 654 |
| Edvard Welle-Strand | 1372 |
| Eugen Westblad | 3561 |
| Viggo Widerøe | 352 |
| Bendt Winge | 3611 |
| Jacob Woronowsky | 8675 |
| Carl P. Wright | 956 |
| Thomas Christian Wyller | 4703 |
| Nic Waal | 9175 |
| Aksel Zachariassen | 827 |
| Per Øisang | 14518 |
| Arnulf Øverland | 381 |
| Margrete Aamot Øverland | 378 |
| Rolf Aakervik | 2342 |
| Gustav Aarestrup | 477 |
| Olaf Aarvold | 9401 |

== See also ==
- List of Arkivet prisoners
- List of Berg prisoners
