= List of Arkivet prisoners =

This is a list of prisoners of Arkivet, a political prison and Gestapo Headquarters which was operated in Nazi-occupied Norway.

A cross symbol next to a name denotes that the person died during World War II, at Arkivet or elsewhere.

Name	Reference
Arne Askildsen	
Henriette Bie Lorentzen	
Gunnar Christian Brøvig †	
Egil Eriksen	
Osmund Faremo	
Halvdan Wexelsen Freihow	
Einar Gauslaa	
Per Græsli †	
Arne Jostein Ingebrethsen †	
Erling Moi †	
Arnt Mørland
Tor Njaa †	
Salve Andreas Salvesen	
Kristian Schjelderup
Gudmund Seland
Ingvald Seland
Christian Stray
Sigrid Stray
Bjarne Aagaard Strøm
Haakon Tranberg	
Tolv Aamland	
Gustav Aarestrup

== See also ==
- List of Berg prisoners
- List of Grini prisoners
