= Maseng =

Maseng is a surname. Notable people with the surname include:

- Alfred Maseng (d. 2004), Vanatuan politician
- Danny Maseng, Israeli singer-songwriter
- Einar Maseng (1880–1972), Norwegian diplomat
- Mari Maseng Will (born 1954), American political advisor
- Ragnvald Maseng (1891–1920), Norwegian sport shooter
- Sigurd Maseng (1894-1952), Norwegian diplomat
- Torleiv Maseng (born 1946), Norwegian engineer
