= Askildsen =

Askildsen is a surname. Notable people with the surname include:

- Arne Askildsen (1898–1982), Norwegian bailiff and politician
- Kjell Askildsen (1929–2021), Norwegian writer
- Kristoffer Askildsen (born 2001), Norwegian footballer
