= Ryssdal =

Ryssdal is a Norwegian surname. Notable people with the surname include:

- Kai Ryssdal (born 1963), American radio journalist
- Rolv Ryssdal (1914–1998), Norwegian judge
- Signe Marie Stray Ryssdal (1924–2019), Norwegian lawyer and politician
