= Sigrid Stray =

- Born: Sigrid Kluge; 29 May 1893; Sandnes, Norway
- Died: 3 July 1978 (aged 85)
- Occupation: Barrister
- Known for: Proponent for women's rights
- Spouse: Christian Stray (m. 1921)
- Children: Signe Marie Stray Ryssdal

Sigrid Stray (née Kluge; 29 May 1893 – 3 July 1978) was a Norwegian barrister and proponent for women's rights.

== Personal life ==
She was born in Sandnes as a daughter of merchant Reier Kluge (1859–1921) and Anna Gausel (1863–1939). In March 1921 she married lawyer and politician Christian Stray, settling in Arendal. They were parents of Signe and Anne Lise Stray and in-laws of Rolv Ryssdal.

== Career ==
Stray became Norway's second female barrister (after Elise Sem), and was a partner in a law firm with her husband. She also chaired the Norwegian National Women's Council from 1938, was ousted by the Nazi authorities in 1941 following the protest of the 43 and also imprisoned in Arkivet in 1944, but returned as chair from 1945 to 1946.

After a period as acting presiding judge in 1945–46, she conducted the defense for her pre-war client Knut Hamsun during the legal purge after World War II. She served as the first female chancellor of the Order of St. Olav, from 1956 to 1967.

== See also ==
- List of Arkivet prisoners
