= List of Berg prisoners =

This is a list of prisoners of Berg concentration camp, which was operated in Nazi-occupied Norway between 1942 and 1945.

A cross symbol next to a name denotes that the person died during World War II, at Berg or elsewhere.

Name	Prisoner number
Einar Amdahl	
Johannes Andenæs	
Carl Jacob Arnholm	
Endre Berner	
Halvdan Bjørum	
Thomas Bonnevie	
Egil Brekke	
Gunnar Eliassen	
Eivind Erichsen	
Andreas Eriksen	
Egil Eriksen	
Ragnar Frisch	
Bjørn Føyn	
Victor Goldschmidt	
Bjarne Gran	
Frank Gunnar Guildford	
Ørnulf Halmrast	
Odd Hassel	
Rudolf Hedemann	
Anatol Heintz	
Sverre J. Herstad	
Carl Haave	
Ragnvald Indrebø	
K. O. Kornelius	
Leif Larsen	
Erling Lauhn	
Andreas Moe	
Arnt Mørland	
Torleiv Bull Njaa	
Erik Nord	
Lars Ramndal	
Øistein Ravnum	
Helge Rognlien	
Atle Roll-Mathiesen	
Harald K. Schjelderup	
Johan Schreiner	
Kåre Schøning	
Eiliv Skard	
Ivar Skjånes	
Vegard Sletten	
Johannes Smemo	
Sverre Steen	
Neri Valen	
Martinus Vanberg	
Lorentz Vogt	
Ole Øisang	
Olav Østby-Deglum	
Ivar Aarseth	

== See also ==
- List of Arkivet prisoners
- List of Grini prisoners
