= SS Grete =

A number of steamships were named Grete, including –

- SS Grete (1892), built by N P Petersen, Thurö
- SS Grete (1902), built by Russell & Co, Port Glasgow
- SS Grete (1920), built by Skiens Verksted, Skien
- SS Grete (1923), built by Neptun AG, Rostock
- SS Grete (1931), built by Helsingfors Jernskæg & Maskinen, Elsinore
