= Gauslaa =

Gauslaa is a surname. Notable people with the surname include:

- Arne Gauslaa (1913–1942), Norwegian communist, newspaper editor, and resistance member
- Einar Gauslaa (1915–1995), Norwegian newspaper editor
