= Einar Gauslaa =

Norwegian newspaper editor (1915–1995)

Einar Gauslaa (21 January 1915 – 1995) was a Norwegian newspaper editor.

He was born in Lillesand. He started his journalist career in Christiansands Tidende, before starting his own newspaper Lillesanderen. In 1937 he was hired as a journalist in Agderposten.

In 1940 World War II reached Norway with the German occupation. On 6 January 1943 Gauslaa was arrested in his home by the Nazi authorities, suspected for membership in the resistance organization Milorg. He was imprisoned at Kristiansand prison and Arkivet, until 30 April 1943, when he was transferred to Grini concentration camp. Here he spent some time in forced labour at Oslo Airport, Fornebu, and also some time at Victoria Terrasse. He was released on 4 October 1944.

In 1946 he became editor-in-chief of Agderposten, a position he held until 1978. In addition to Gauslaa, news editor Bjarne Aagard Strøm was the most notable person in Agderposten during this period. His son Stein Gauslaa has also edited Agderposten. Einar Gauslaa was also a board member of the Norwegian Press Association, and a member of Arendal city council. He contributed with causeries to the Norwegian Broadcasting Corporation radio, and collections of his causeries were twice published as books: Glitter i gråstein and 30 kåserier. He also wrote short stories in Magasinet for alle.

In May 1988 he was awarded the HM The King's Medal of Merit in gold. He died in the summer of 1995.
