= Gunvald =

Gunvald is a given name. Notable people with the name include:

- Gunvald Aus (1851–1950), Norwegian-American engineer
- Gunvald Bøe (1903–1967), Norwegian archivist and historian
- Gunvald Engelstad (1900–1972), Norwegian politician for the Labour Party
- Gunvald Ludvigsen (born 1949), Norwegian politician for the Liberal Party
- Gunvald Strøm-Walseng (1889–1951), Norwegian barrister
- Gunvald Thorkildsen, Norwegian theologian and bishop
- Gunvald Tomstad (1918–1970), major agent of the British SIS, Norwegian resistance member during World War II

== Fictional characters ==
- Gunvald Larsson, sidekick of Martin Beck in novels by Maj Sjowall and Per Wahloo

== See also ==
- Kunvald
