= Herstad =

Herstad is a surname. Notable people with the surname include:

- Harry Herstad (1946–2017), Norwegian civil servant, sports administrator and politician
- John Herstad (born 1936), Norwegian historian
- Svein Olav Herstad (born 1969), Norwegian jazz pianist
- Sverre J. Herstad (1905–1999), Norwegian journalist and politician
