= Krigsseilerregisteret =

krigsseilerregisteret.no
- Website type: Register
- Available in: Norwegian, English
- Owner: Stiftelsen Arkivet
- Creators: Bjørn Tore Rosendahl, Simen Zernichow, Thorbjørn Solberg Andersen
- Editor: Ole Jørgen S. Abrahamsen
- Revenue: Donations and public funding
- Website: krigsseilerregisteret.no/en
- Commercial: Non-profit website
- Registration: Norwegian sailors and ships 1939 - 1945; World War II
- Current status: Expanding
- Written in: Norwegian/English

Krigsseilerregisteret (English: The War Sailor Register, established on 19 January 2016) is a Norwegian website whose purpose is to create a register of all Norwegian sailors and ships that sailed in the period 1939 to 1945 for the neutral countries, for Nortraship, the Norwegian Domestic Fleet, the Royal Norwegian Navy, Allied and neutral merchant ships and in Allied navies. The website is still under preparation. The register/website is in Norwegian and English.

Arkivet Foundation is the owner and responsible for the War Sailor Register and the Norwegian Centre for War Sailor History and has collaborated with Lillesand Sjømannsforening. The register is funded by private contributors and received in 2016 a grant from the Norwegian state budget.

The register was opened in the presence of author Jon Michelet, who himself has been engaged in the theme, in January 2016.

== See also ==
- Norsk krigsseilermuseum
