= Noren (surname) =

Noren (暖簾) are traditional Japanese fabric dividers hung between rooms, on walls, in doorways, or in windows.

Noren or Norén is a Swedish surname that may refer to:

== Noren ==
- Eric Noren (born 1977), American director of films, commercials and music videos
- Irv Noren (1924–2019), American baseball and basketball player
- Jack Noren (1929–1990), American jazz drummer and vocalist
- Jay Noren, American university administrator

== Norén ==
- Alex Norén (born 1982), Swedish golfer
- Carl Norén (born 1983), Swedish singer and songwriter, part of band Sugarplum Fairy
- Carolina Norén (born 1965), Swedish radio presenter
- Edmund Norén (1902–1983), Norwegian media executive and politician
- Fredrik Norén (1941–2016), Swedish jazz drummer
- Gustaf Norén (born 1981), Swedish rock musician and actor, part of band Mando Diao, State of Sound, part of duo Viktor & Gustaf Norén
- Lars Norén (1944–2021), Swedish playwright, novelist and poet
- Nils Norén (born c. 1967), Swedish-American chef and culinary educator
- Patrik Norén (born 1992), Swedish ice hockey player
- Stig Norén (1908–1996), Swedish Air Force general
- Svea Norén (1895–1985), Swedish figure skater
- Victor Norén or Viktor Norén (born 1985), Swedish singer and songwriter, part of band Sugarplum Fairy and part of duo Viktor & Gustaf Norén

== Characters ==
- Saga Norén, fictional character and the main protagonist of the Swedish/Danish TV series The Bridge
