= Stein Gauslaa =

Norwegian journalist and civil servant

- Born: 27 October 1948; Arendal, Norway
- Died: 7 January 2017 (aged 68); Arendal
- Occupations: Journalist; Civil servant
- Known for: Chief editor of Agderposten
- Parent: Einar Gauslaa

Stein Gauslaa (27 October 1948 – 7 January 2017) was a Norwegian journalist and civil servant.

== Career ==
Gauslaa was born in Arendal, and was educated as teacher and journalist. He worked as journalist for the newspaper Nationen from 1971 to 1974, for NRK from 1974 to 1982, and for Verdens Gang from 1982 to 1984. From 1984 to 1985 he worked for the Ministry of Finance, and from 1985 to 1988 for the Norwegian Bankers' Association. He was editor of the newspaper Dagens Næringsliv from 1990 to 1996, and chief editor of Agderposten from 1996 to 2009.

He died in Arendal on 7 January 2017.
