= Rigmor Frimannslund Holmsen =

Norwegian ethnologist

- Born: 31 January 1911; Bergen, Norway
- Died: 28 April 2006 (aged 95); Bærum
- Occupation: Ethnologist
- Spouse: Andreas Holmsen (m. 1961; died 1989)

Rigmor Frimannslund Holmsen (31 January 1911 – 28 April 2006) was a Norwegian ethnologist.

== Personal life ==
Frimannslund was born in Bergen on 31 January 1911, a daughter of military officer Bernhard Marius Frimannslund and Anna Sofie Thomassen. She was married to historian Andreas Holmsen from 1961 until his death in 1989.

== Career ==
Holmsen graduated as mag.art. in 1941. Her thesis was a treatment of marriage proposal traditions in Norway.

From 1946 she was appointed as conservator-restorer at the Norwegian Museum of Cultural History, at the museum's newly established section Norsk etnologisk gransking. She was assigned with this institute and the Institute for Comparative Research in Human Culture during most of her career. Her research work focused on rural societies, including farms and neighbourhoods, primarily in Norway.

She died in Bærum on 28 April 2006.
