= Kristian Bloch =

Danish footballer (born 2010)

Personal information
- Full name: Kristian Bloch Bøgild
- Date of birth: 28 January 2010 (age 16)
- Place of birth: Silkeborg
- Position: Winger

Team information
- Current team: Silkeborg
- Number: 42

Youth career
- Silkeborg

Senior career*
| Years | Team | Apps | (Gls) |
| 2026– | Silkeborg | 4 | (0) |

International career^{‡}
| 2025– | Denmark U16 | 10 | (1) |
| 2026– | Denmark U17 | 2 | (0) |
- * Club domestic league appearances and goals ‡ National team caps and goals as of 9 August 2026

Kristian Bloch Bøgild (born 18 January 2010) is a Danish professional footballer who plays as a winger for Silkeborg.

== Early life ==
Bloch was born on 18 January 2010. Born in Denmark, he is the son of Michael.

== Club career ==
As a youth player, Bloch joined the youth academy of Silkeborg at under-10 level. On 11 October 2026, he recorded his first assist for the club during a 3–3 home draw with Horsens in the league.

== International career ==
Bloch is a Denmark youth international and has represented the country internationally at under-16 and under-17 level. While playing for the Denmark national under-16 football team, he played under Danish manager Kasper Kececi.

On 5 September 2025, he scored his first goal for the Denmark national under-16 football team during a 4–3 home friendly win over the Romania national under-16 football team. On 7 August 2026, he debuted for the Denmark national under-17 football team during a 4–2 away friendly win over the Sweden national under-17 football team.
