= Kjell Askildsen =

Norwegian writer (1929–2021)

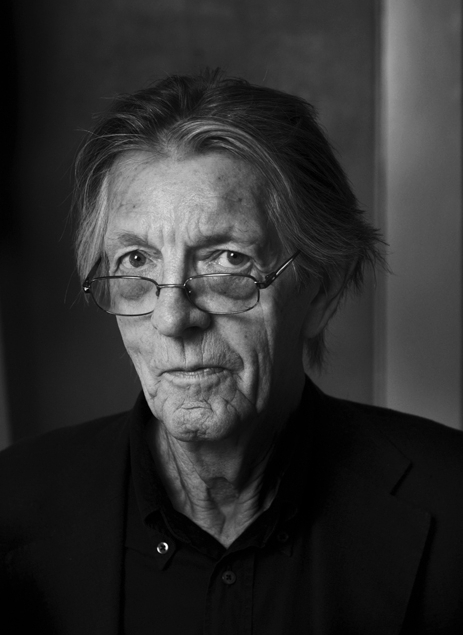
- Askildsen
- Born: 30 September 1929; Mandal, Norway
- Died: 23 September 2021 (aged 91)
- Occupation: Writer
- Spouse: Gina Giertsen
- Writing career
- Language: Norwegian
- Period: 1953–2021
- Genres: Short stories, novels
- Notable work: Thomas F's Last Notes to the Public
- Notable awards: The Swedish Academy's Nordic Prize (2009) and others

Kjell Askildsen (30 September 1929 – 23 September 2021) was a Norwegian writer best known for his minimalistic short stories.

== Personal life ==
Askildsen was born in Mandal as a son of bailiff and politician Arne Askildsen (1898–1982) and Aasta Håverstad (1898–1978). Before the Second World War, his father was the bailiff of the town of Mandal and the neighboring Halse og Harkmark Municipality from 1928, a board member of the Norwegian Lutheran Mission since 1939, and also a member of the school board and municipal council for Mandal Municipality. During the war and occupation of Norway, his father was imprisoned in Arkivet twice, before escaping to Sweden in 1944. Two older brothers of Kjell Askildsen were held captive in Grini concentration camp.

After the war, Askildsen enrolled in the Independent Norwegian Brigade Group in Germany. He was married to a German woman for some time. From August 1951 to March 1968 he was married to Edith Dorothea Mathiessen, and from June 1992 he was married to Gina Giertsen.

Askildsen died on 23 September 2021, at the age of 91.

== Writing career ==
His first book, the short story collection Heretter følger jeg deg helt hjem (1953), raised controversy, especially in Mandal, for its sexual content. After that book, Askildsen concentrated mainly on novels. He was awarded the Mads Wiel Nygaards Endowment in recognition of his novel, Omgivelser (1969), which was made into the 1973 movie Maria Marusjka, directed by Oddvar Bull Tuhus and starring Peter Lindgren.

From 1982 on, all of Askildsen's published books have been short story collections. It is mainly these books that made him one of the most acclaimed modern writers in Norway. Thomas F's siste nedtegnelser til almenheten (1983) won him the Norwegian Critics Prize for Literature. In 2006, a jury appointed by the newspaper Dagbladet voted that collection the best prose book written in Norway during the last 25 years. He has won other awards as well, almost one for each new publication.

== Norwegian bibliography ==
=== Short story collections ===
- 1953 - Heretter følger jeg deg helt hjem (From now on I'll walk you all the way Home)
- 1966 - Kulisser (Stage Sets)
- 1982 - Ingenting for ingenting (Nothing for Nothing)
- 1983 - Thomas F's siste nedtegnelser til almenheten (Thomas F's Last Notes to the Public)
- 1987 - En plutselig frigjørende tanke (A Sudden Liberating Thought)
- 1991 - Et stort øde landskap (A Great Deserted Landscape)
- 1996 - Hundene i Tessaloniki (The Dogs of Thessaloniki)
- 1999 - Samlede noveller (Collected Short Stories)
- 2005 - Alt som før (Everything As Before)
- 2015 - Vennskapets pris (The Cost of Friendship)

=== Novels ===
- 1955 - Herr Leonard Leonard (Mister Leonard Leonard)
- 1957 - Davids bror (The brother of David)
- 1969 - Omgivelser (Scenery)
- 1974 - Kjære, kjære Oluf (Dear, dear Oluf)
- 1976 - Hverdag (Everyday)

== Awards and prizes (selection) ==
- 2010 - Sørlandet Honorary Award
- 2009 – Swedish Academy Nordic Prize
- 2004 – Det Norske Akademis Pris til minne om Thorleif Dahl
- 1997 – Oktober Prize
- 1996 – Brage Prize Honorary Award
- 1995 – Dobloug Prize
- 1991 – Norwegian Critics Prize for Literature for Et stort øde landskap
- 1991 – Aschehoug Prize
- 1987 – Riksmål Society Literature Prize
- 1983 – Norwegian Critics Prize for Literature for Thomas Fs siste nedtegnelser til allmennheten
- 1969 – Mads Wiel Nygaard's Endowment
- Ikaros-prisen
