= Rudolf Kerner =

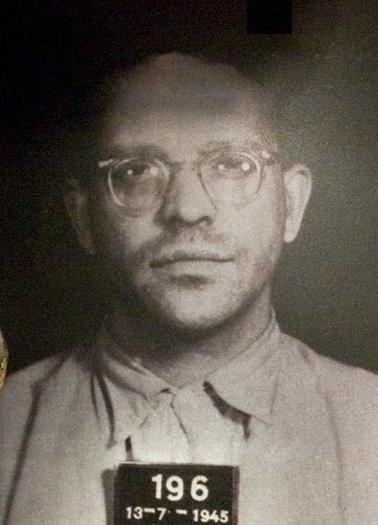
Rudolf Kerner as a prisoner in 1945

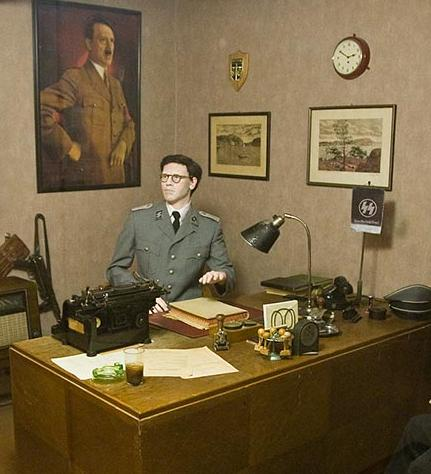
Exhibition from "Horror House" in Kristiansand, showing the local Gestapo chief Rudolf Kerner in his office in the Statsarkivet in the city. The archive is currently the only surviving Gestapo headquarters in Norway

Rudolf Kerner (21 February 1910 in Saarbrücken – ? 1998) was a German SS-Hauptsturmführer and crime commissioner. He was head of the German Security Police and Gestapo in Kristiansand, Norway, from 1941. After the war he was sentenced to death but later pardoned.

== In charge of Gestapo headquarters ==
In 1942 Gestapo took over the building of the state archives, "Arkivet" in Kristiansand. The local Gestapo commander was Rudolf Kerner, and it was he who determined who should be heard. During the war was about 3,500 Norwegians from Sørlandet arrested on of more than four days. Over 400 were tortured by the German security police and Gestapo, and 162 died in concentration camps or were executed. One of the tortured was resistance fighter Louis Hogganvik.

"Horror house" as the nickname was of Arkivet, is today the only surviving Gestapo headquarters in Norway, and appears almost authentic.

Kerner was in charge of several German security police actions at Sørlandet in World War II together with the Norwegian Statspolitiet (STAPO).

== Sentences ==
Kerner was on 16 June 1947 sentenced to death for crimes against Penal Codes - for crimes against Norwegian patriots. Kerner was originally charged with, among other crimes, to have executed a number of Soviet POWs. The basis for the indictment was that all of these killings were carried out without the existence of judgments or court procedures. Yet, the Supreme Court of Norway dismissed Kerner at this point because there was insufficient evidence of whether the minimum requirements for a lawful execution had been met. The death sentence was reduced in 1948 to life imprisonment. Kerner was released in October 1953 and then returned to Germany, expelled and declared unwanted in Norway for lifetime. He settled in Heidelberg, where he lived as a shoe salesman.
