= Sigrid Maseng =

Norwegian painter (1913–1993)

Sigrid Kirsten Maseng (29 December 1913 – 4 February 1993) was a Norwegian painter.

She was born in Kristianina as a daughter of diplomat Einar Maseng (1880–1972) and painter Frida Wankel (1886–1982). She resided at Høvik in Bærum. She studied at the Norwegian National Academy of Craft and Art Industry until 1932, then three years in Hamburg at Hansische Hochschule für Bildende Kunst and Akademie für Angewandte Kunst. From January 1935 to May 1936 she studied at the Norwegian National Academy of Fine Arts under Halfdan Strøm and Jean Heiberg.

During the Second World War she joined the illegal press, campaigning against the German occupation of Norway. She was arrested by the authorities on 5 December 1944, incarcerated in Bredtveit concentration camp until 21 January 1945, and then in Grini concentration camp until the war's end. After the war she published the book Kvinner på Grini (Women at Grini) with her own illustrations.

She was a part of the Autumn Exhibition in 1948, 1949, 1950, 1951, 1956 and 1969. An exhibition of her aquarels at Unge Kunstneres Samfund in 1959, together with two other women artists, received decent reviews.

In 1970 Maseng received a government grant, the Statens garantiinntekt for kunstnere. She died in February 1993.
