= Bjarne Aagaard Strøm =

Norwegian politician (1920–2008)

Bjarne Aagaard Strøm (29 May 1920 – 3 January 2008) was a Norwegian newspaper editor and politician for the Liberal Party.

He hailed from Kristiansand. After World War II reached Norway in 1940 with the German invasion and subsequent occupation, Strøm joined the Norwegian resistance movement at the age of 22. Already in August 1942 he was arrested by the Nazi authorities for his connection to Milorg, and was imprisoned at Kristiansand prison and Arkivet. From 5 October 1942 to 30 April 1943 he was incarcerated at Grini concentration camp. He was sentenced to death by a German court in 1943, but Josef Terboven was pressured and personally changed the sentence to lifelong forced labour. Strøm was shipped to a concentration camp in Germany, but survived the stay and returned to Norway after Germany's loss in the war.

Later in 1945 he was hired as a journalist in the newspaper Agderposten. He was promoted to subeditor already in 1947, and was promoted further to news editor in 1956 and political editor in 1963. From 1968 to his retirement he was the editor-in-chief of Haugesunds Avis. In September 1986 his successor from May 1987, Kristian Magnus Vikse, was named. Strøm also served as a deputy representative to the Parliament of Norway from Aust-Agder during the term 1965–1969. He met in 46 days of parliamentary session. He chaired Norges Venstrepresselag and Sosialliberalt Presselag, and was a board member of the Norwegian News Agency. He was a freemason.

Strøm met his future wife in 1945, and married in 1946. He died in early 2008.
