= Signe Marie Stray Ryssdal =

Norwegian politician (1924–2019)

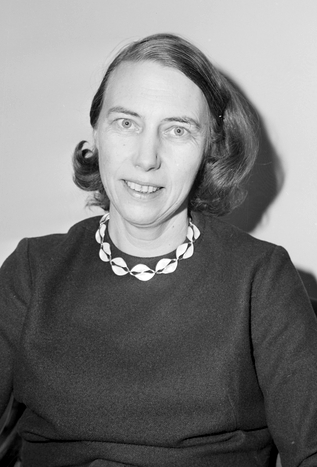
- Signe Marie Stray Ryssdal in 1972
- Born: Signe Marie Stray; 22 July 1924; Tromøy Municipality, Norway
- Died: 18 May 2019 (aged 94); Arendal, Norway
- Occupations: Lawyer and politician
- Spouse: Rolv Ryssdal (m. 1954; died 1998)
- Children: Anders Christian Stray Ryssdal; Kristin Ryssdal; Rolv Erik Ryssdal
- Parent(s): Christian Stray (father); Sigrid Stray (mother)

Signe Marie Stray Ryssdal (née Signe Marie Stray; 22 July 1924–18 May 2019) was a Norwegian lawyer and politician for the Liberal Party.

== Early life and education ==
Stray Ryssdal was born in Tromøy Municipality as a daughter of barristers Sigrid Stray (née Kluge; 1893–1978) and Christian Stray (1894–1981). She finished her secondary education in 1943, and studied law at the University of Oslo from 1945 to 1948. She spent the summer of 1948 studying at the Peace Palace.

== Career ==
Stray Ryssdal was a deputy judge for the Kragerø District Court and later the Steigen District Court before working as a secretary and inspector in Riksskattestyret from 1951 to 1956.

In 1956, she opened her own law practice in Oslo. She became a barrister with access to Supreme Court cases in 1960, as the third woman in Norway. In politics, she served as a deputy representative to the Parliament of Norway from Oslo from 1965 to 1973, and was a member of Oslo city council from 1968 to 1972. In 1972 she left the lawyer job to become chief administrative officer of social affairs (sosialrådmann) in Oslo. She stood for parliamentary election in 1973 on the Liberal People's Party ballot, but was not elected. Her career ended with the post of County Governor of Aust-Agder, which she held from 1983 until her retirement in 1994.

Stray Ryssdal was the chairman of the board of the National Insurance Administration from 1968 to 1980. She was also a board member of Dagbladet and the supervisory board of Kreditkassen. She was a member of several public boards and committees; some of them as a jurist (Sivillovbokutvalet, Skattekomiteen av 1966, Narkotikarådet) and some of them as a non-jurist, chairing Statens eldreråd from 1979 to 1993. She led the committees that published the Norwegian Official Reports 1976:1 and 1988:39. She was also active in several organizations, including the Norwegian Bar Association.

== Personal life ==
In December 1954, she married Rolv Ryssdal (1914–1998), who would become Chief Justice of the Supreme Court. They had three children; Anders Christian Stray Ryssdal, Kristine and Rolv Erik Ryssdal. Stray Ryssdal resided in Arendal. Stray Ryssdal died in the Norwegian town of Arendal on 18 May 2019, at the age of 94.

Government offices
| Preceded by Ebba Lodden | County Governor of Aust-Agder; 1983–1994 | Succeeded by Hjalmar Inge Sunde |
