= Andreas Holmsen =

Norwegian historian, author, and educator

Andreas Holmsen (5 June 1906 – 20 February 1989) was a Norwegian historian, author, and educator. He is most commonly associated with his textbook Norges historie fra de eldste tider til 1660 (Norwegian History from the Oldest Times to 1660), which is a standard introduction to early Norwegian history.

== Personal life ==
He was born in Kristiania (now Oslo), Norway. He was a son of head teacher Andreas Holmsen (1857–1926) and Dagmar Berger (1865–1948). From 1933 he was married to Solveig Ingebrethsen, a daughter of the newspaper editor Ingolf Ingebrethsen and sister of Arne Jostein Ingebrethsen, but the marriage was dissolved. In 1961 he married the ethnologist Rigmor Frimannslund (1911–2006). They resided at Vøyenenga. He died in February 1989 in Bærum.

== Career ==
Holmsen graduated from the University of Oslo (Cand. Philol. 1931). Andreas Holmsen was a consultant in history at the Institute of Economics at the University of Oslo from 1934 to 1940. He was a professor of history at the university from 1955 to 1975. During the course of his career, Holmsen wrote several books and numerous articles in addition to delivering a number of scientific papers. His work principally concerned Norwegian socioeconomic and social history.

== Bibliography ==
- 1936 Eidsvold bygds historie vol. 1.
- 1937 Sogn. Økonomisk og administrativ historie
- 1939 Norges historie. Fra de eldste tider til 1660 (1st ed.)
- 1943 Røkholt-Venger ætten. En slektsoversikt.
- 1946 Fra Linderud til Eidsvold Værk vol. 1.
- 1950 Eidsvold bygds historie vol. 2
- 1966 Gard, bygd, rike (Festschrift)
- 1971 Fra Linderud til Eidsvold Værk vol. 2.
- 1976 Nye studier i gammel historie
- 1978 Hva kan vi vite om agrarkatastrofen i Norge i middelalderen?
- 1984 Den store mannedauen

== Other sources ==
- Lunden, Kåre and Harald Winge (1986) Andreas Holmsen en bibliografi over hans historiske forfatterskap (Oslo: Norsk loklahistorisk institutt)
- Fagerbakk, Terje (1989) Om å gå bakover - Andreas Holmsen i norsk lokalhistorisk forskning (University of Tromsø)

== Related reading ==
- Holmsen, Andreas (1977) Norges Historie:Fra de eldste tider til 1660 (Universitetsforlaget AS) ISBN 978-8200032441
