= MS Borgestad =

Norwegian cargo ship built in 1925

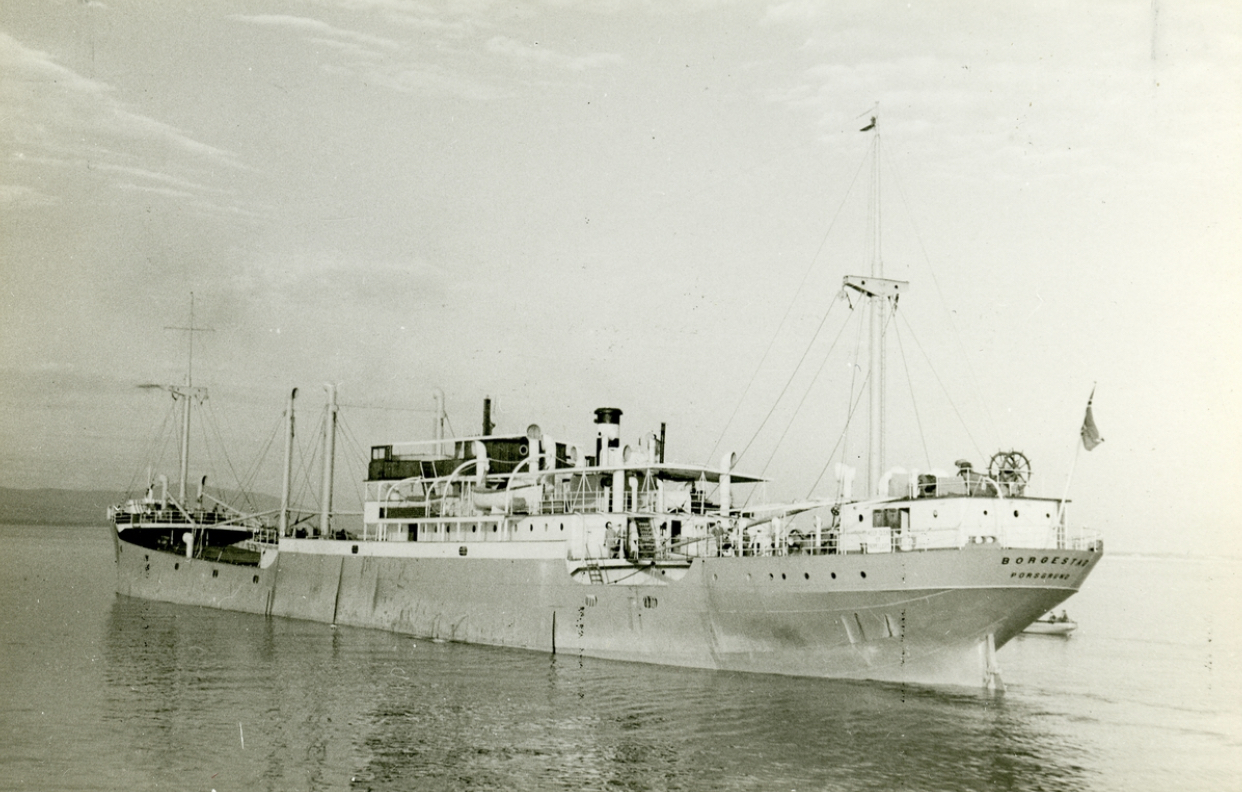
- MS Borgestad

History

Norway
- Name: Borgestad
- In service: 1925–1941

MS Borgestad was a Norwegian diesel-powered cargo ship, built at Burmeister & Wain, Copenhagen in 1925. The vessel is known for having engaged the German heavy cruiser Admiral Hipper to protect a convoy, where many of the vessels managed to escape thanks to her actions. Borgestad was sunk in early 1941 and all 31 people on board perished. Captain Lars Grotnæss was awarded the War Cross, post mortem.

== Encounter with Admiral Hipper ==
Borgestad's encounter in the Atlantic with Admiral Hipper in 30 January 1941 was reported in Norwegian newspapers as early as May 1945, including Agderposten.

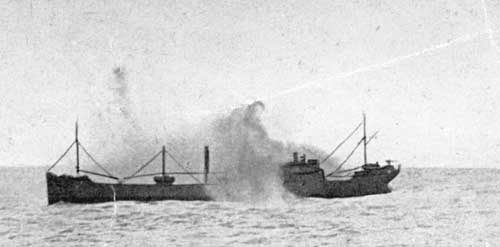
Borgestad under fire, its last moments, 1941

The ship was travelling east across the Atlantic towards England and the convoy's destination, Liverpool. The convoy was without a military escort and Borgestad was in the front line of the convoy. Borgestad was armed with a single gun, which was manned. The ship headed straight for the German cruiser and fired relentlessly, even though they knew that the target could not be reached with a small anti-submarine gun.

Captain Lars Grotnes's maneuver gave the other ships in the convoy chance to disperse while the German cruiser turned its attention to the attacker. Agderposten characterizes this as a battle between David and Goliath, and it could not last long. After a broadside from the cruiser, Borgestad was sunk. The German cruiser sank a further five of the convoy's ships.

"... it is certain that if Borgestad's crew had not so bravely sacrificed their lives, the convoy's losses would have been far greater", writes Agderposten. "The feat was also praised as one of the most brilliant examples of Norwegian seamanship and patriotism during the war, and Borgestad's entire crew was decorated after their death"

== Trips ==
Departure	From	To	Arrival	Convoy	Remarks
Apr. 1 1940	Durban	Cape Town	Apr. 4	Independent	For earlier trips see this Note
Apr. 8 1940	Cape Town	Takoradi	Apr. 19	Independent	
Apr. 26 1940	Takoradi	Baie Comeau	?	Independent	Arrived at Sorel-Tracy in May 20
May 27, 1940	Baie Comeau	Botwood	June 1	Independent	
June 5, 1940	Botwood	Cristóbal	June 23	Independent	
June 24, 1940	Balboa	Los Angeles	July 7	Independent	
July 7, 1940	Los Angeles	Tacoma	July 13	Independent	
July 15, 1940	Tacoma	Vancouver	July 16	Independent	
July 24, 1940	Vancouver	Colombo	Sept. 9	Independent	
Sept. 18 1940	Colombo	Bombay	Sept. 24	Independent	
Sept. 24 1940	Bombay	Port Sudan	Oct. 8	BN 6	For Port Sudan (left convoy Oct. 7) Convoy available at BN 6
Nov. 7 1940	Port Sudan	?	?	BS 8	For Port Elizabeth. Dispersed off Aden, Nov. 12. Convoy available at BS 8
Nov. 12 1940	Dispersed from BS 8	Port Elizabeth	Nov. 30	Independent	
Dec. 30 1940	Port Elizabeth	Cape Town	Jan. 2 1941	Independent	
Jan. 3 1941	Cape Town	Freetown	Jan. 19	Independent	
Jan. 30 1941	Freetown	?	?	SLS 64	Sunk by German cruiser Admiral Hipper
