= SS Empire Energy =

German-built cargo steamship

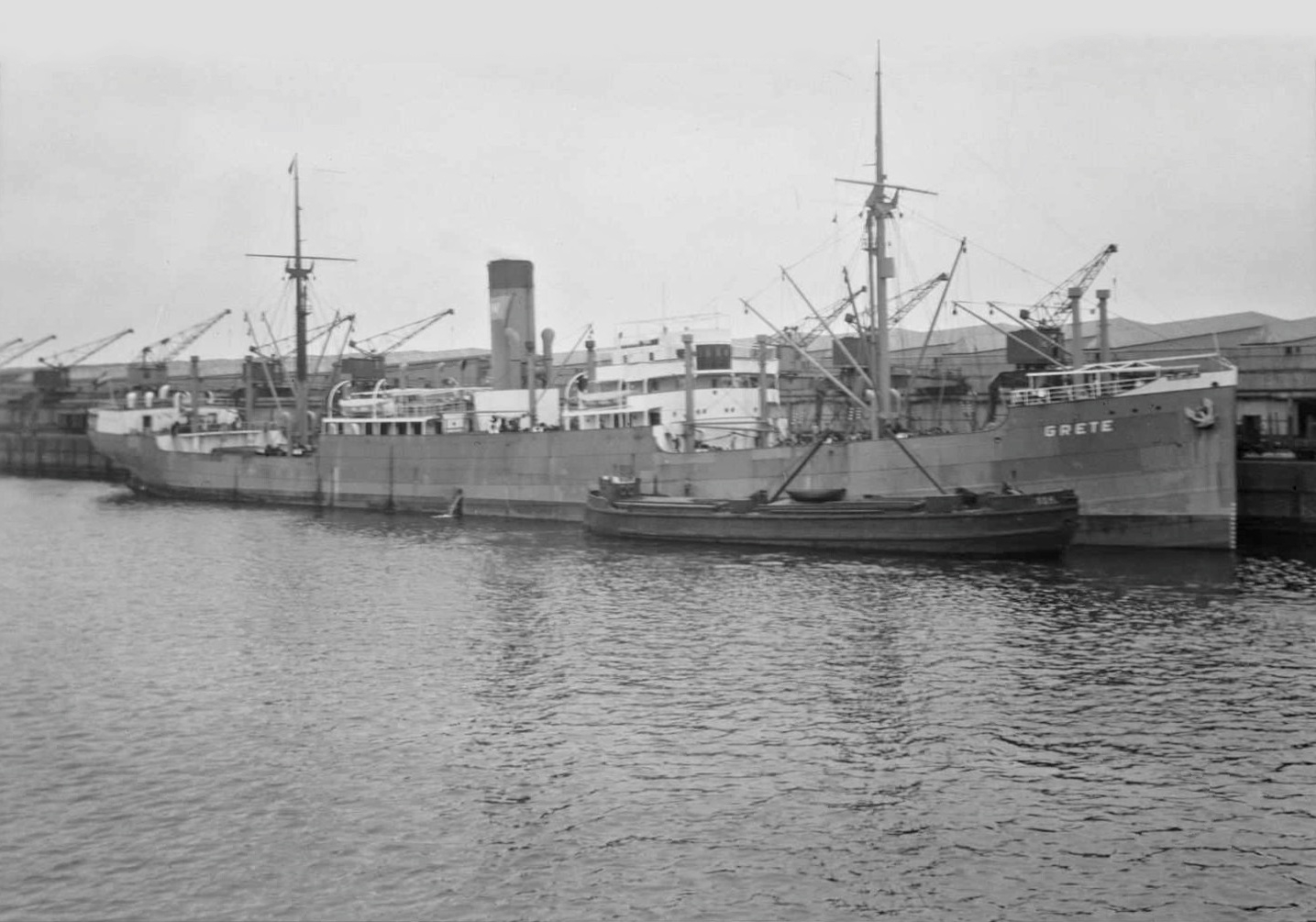
- The ship as Grete

History
- Name: 1923: Grete; 1934: Gabbiano; 1940: Empire Energy
- Owner: 1923: Carl Wohlenberg; 1934: Achille Lauro; 1940: Ministry of Shipping; 1941: Ministry of War Transport
- Operator: 1940: ER Management Co, Ltd
- Port of registry: 1923: (Weimar Republic) Hamburg, Germany; 1934: (Kingdom of Italy) Naples, Italy; 1940: (United Kingdom) London, UK
- Builder: AG "Neptun", Rostock
- Completed: July 1923
- Identification: 1923: code letters RDPM; 1934: call sign DHJU; 1934: Italian official number 428; 1934: call sign IBOP; 1940: UK official number 167601; 1940: call sign GLWY
- Captured: 10 June 1940
- Fate: Wrecked, 5 November 1941

General characteristics
- Type: cargo ship
- Tonnage: 6,567 GRT, 4,006 NRT
- Length: 440.0 ft (134.1 m)
- Beam: 57.1 ft (17.4 m)
- Draught: 25 ft 9 1/4 in (7.85 m)
- Depth: 29.5 ft (9.0 m)
- Decks: 2
- Installed power: as built: 1 × triple-expansion engine; 640 NHP; by 1930: as above, plus exhaust steam turbine; 720 NHP
- Propulsion: 1 × screw
- Sensors & processing systems: as built: submarine signalling; by 1934: as above, plus wireless direction finding

SS Empire Energy was a cargo steamship. She was built in Germany in 1923 as Grete for small German tramp shipping company. In 1934 the Italian shipping magnate Achille Lauro bought her and renamed her Gabbiano.

When Italy entered the Second World War in 1940, Gabbiano was in a British port, so the Royal Navy seized her. The UK Ministry of Shipping renamed her Empire Energy, and appointed a British tramp company to manage her. In 1941 she was wrecked on the coast of Newfoundland. Her wreck remains on the shore at Cape Norman to this day.

== Grete ==
Carl Wohlenberg was a small shipping company based in Hamburg. In 1921 it took delivery of a pair of 1,746 GRT coasters, Franziska and Hertha, from Howaldtswerke in Hamburg. In July 1923, Wohlenberg took delivery of an ocean-going cargo ship, Grete, from AG "Neptun" in Rostock. By 1925, Wohlenberg had sold Franziska and Hertha. Grete was then Wohlenberg's only ship until 1934, when Achille Lauro bought her.

Grete's registered length was 440.0 ft (134.1 m); her beam was 57.1 ft (17.4 m); her depth was 29.5 ft (9.0 m); and her draught was 25 ft 9 1/4 in (7.85 m). Her tonnages were 6,567 GRT and 4,006 NRT. She had a single screw. As built, she had a three-cylinder triple-expansion engine, which was rated at 640 NHP. She was equipped with wireless telegraphy and submarine signalling. She was registered in Hamburg. Her code letters were RDPM.

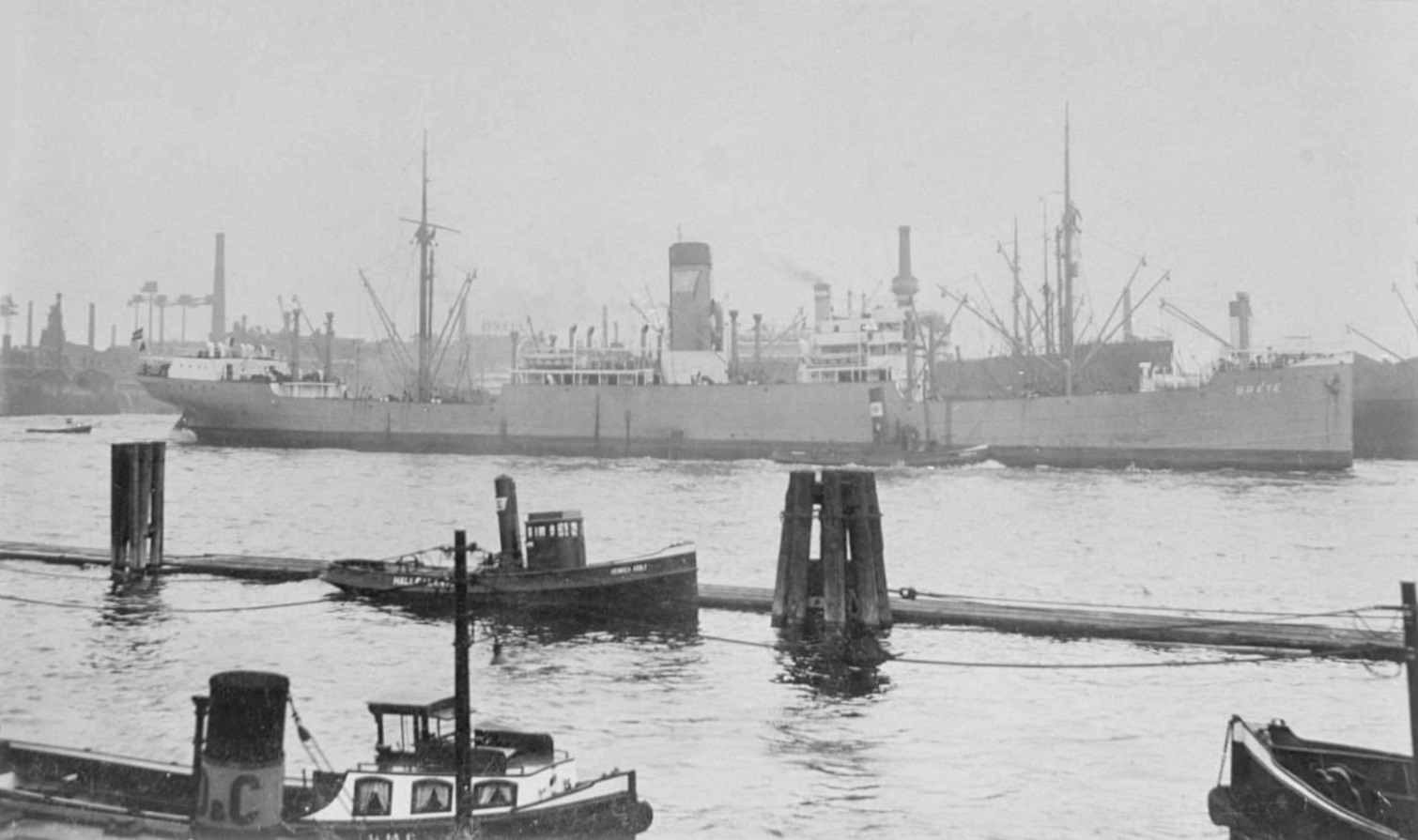
Grete in port. On her funnel is a representation of Carl Wohlenberg's house flag: a blue rectangle with a white capital W in the middle.

By 1930, her engine had been supplemented with a Bauer-Wach exhaust steam turbine. This drove her propeller shaft via a Föttinger fluid coupling and double-reduction gearing. The combined power of her reciprocating engine plus turbine was rated at 720 NHP.

By 1934, wireless direction finding had been added to her navigating equipment. Also by 1934, the call sign DHJU superseded her code letters.

== Gabbiano ==
Also in 1934, Achille Lauro bought Grete; renamed her Gabbiano; and registered her in Naples. Her Italian official number was 428, and her call sign was IBOP.

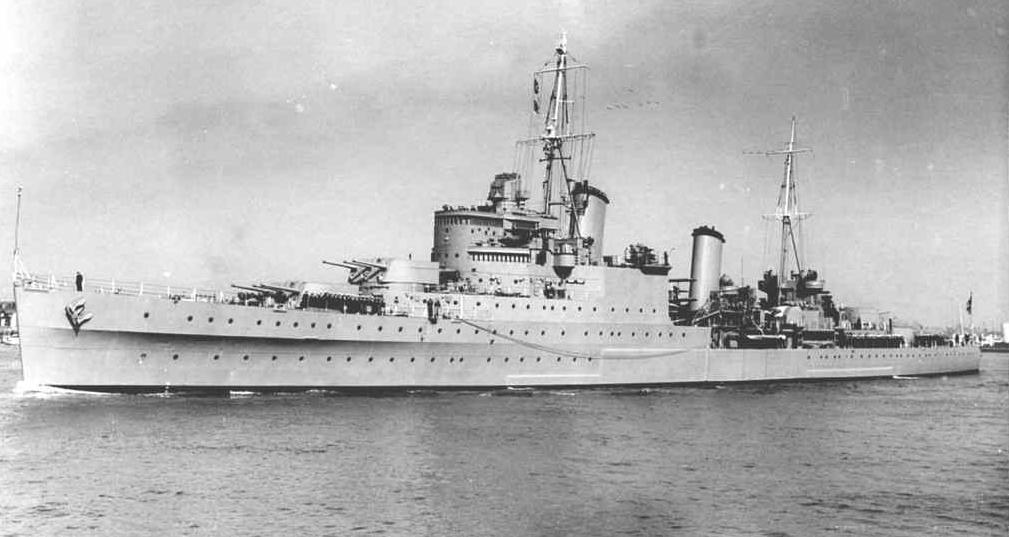
HMS Glasgow in 1937

On 10 June 1940, Italy entered the Second World War by invading France. At the time, Gabbiano was in Liverpool, England. The light cruiser HMS Glasgow was berthed near her for repairs, so a party from the cruiser boarded the cargo ship, and seized her with no resistance. The British allowed the Italian crew to pack their belongings, before interning them as enemy aliens.

== Empire Energy ==
An Admiralty court declared Grete a prize. The UK Ministry of Shipping (MoS) took possession of her; renamed her Empire Energy; and registered her in London. Her UK official number was 167601, and her call sign was GLWY. The MoS appointed ER Management Co, Ltd to manage her.

On 31 July 1940, Empire Energy left Liverpool with Convoy OB 192, which dispersed at sea on 4 August. She called at Durban, South Africa from 8 to 16 September, and reached Bombay (now Mumbai), India, on 6 October. She left Bombay on 3 November; called at Durban from 27 November to 13 December; and Cape Town from 18 to 20 December. She was in Luanda, Angola from 1 to 12 January 1941; briefly called at Pointe-Noire, Belgian Congo; and on 23 January arrived off Freetown, Sierra Leone with a cargo of oilseed to await a convoy home.

=== Attack by Admiral Hipper ===
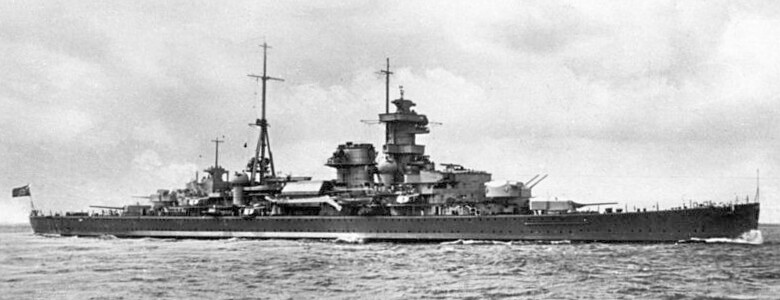
The German cruiser Admiral Hipper

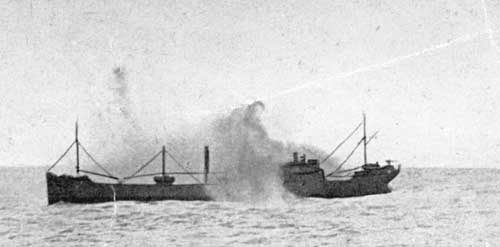
Motor ship Borgestad hit by Admiral Hipper

Empire Energy left Freetown on 30 January with Convoy SL 64S, which was a slow convoy of 19 merchant ships, and had no naval escort. On the morning of 12 February, the German cruiser Admiral Hipper approached the convoy, posing as a Royal Navy cruiser, before opening fire at a range of 3 to 5 nautical miles (6 to 9 km). SL 64S immediately dispersed, but Hipper closed to attack, and with artillery fire and 12 torpedoes she sank seven ships. They were the British ships Derrynane, Oswestry Grange, Shrewsbury, Warlaby, and Westbury; Norwegian Borgestad; and Greek Perseus. Another British ship, Lornaston, was damaged but survived and put into São Miguel in the Azores. Empire Energy escaped damage, and reached Avonmouth on 28 February.

=== Across the North Atlantic ===
On 8 March 1941, Empire Energy crossed the Bristol Channel from Avonmouth to Newport in South Wales. She left on 23 May; arrived off Milford Haven the next day; and left on 27 May to join Convoy OB 327, which left Liverpool on 28 May and dispersed at sea. She reached Reykjavík in allied-occupied Iceland on 2 June. She left on 15 June, and may have joined Convoy OB 336, which left Liverpool that day, and dispersed at sea on 25 June. She reached Boston, Massachusetts, on 28 June.

Empire Energy loaded pig iron; scrap iron; and "special cargo"; left Boston on 10 July; and reached Halifax, Nova Scotia, on 12 July to await an eastbound convoy. She left on 16 July with Convoy HX 139, which was bound for Liverpool, but Empire Energy detached from it, and put into Reykjavík on 28 July. On 1 August she resumed her voyage, and then at sea she joined Convoy HX 140, which had left Halifax on 22 July. HX 140 was bound for Liverpool, but Empire Energy detached off the Firth of Clyde, and arrived in the Firth of Lorn off Oban on 8 August. The next day she left the Firth of Lorn with Convoy WN 165, which rounded the north of Scotland, and on 11 August arrived off Methil on the Firth of Forth. From there she joined Convoy FS 566, which left on 12 August. FS 566 was bound for Southend, but Empire Energy detached, and on 13 August arrived in Middlesbrough, Yorkshire.

On 9 September 1941, Empire Energy left Middlesbrough to join Convoy FN 515, which had left Southend on 7 September and arrived off Methil on 9 September. She left on 13 September to join Convoy EC 72, which had left Southend on 11 September. EC 72 was bound for the Firth of Clyde, but on 15 September Empire Energy detached at Loch Ewe. She called at Philadelphia, Pennsylvania on 10 October, and was in New York from 12 October, loading a cargo of maize. She then sailed from to Sydney, Nova Scotia to await a convoy home.

=== Loss and wreck ===
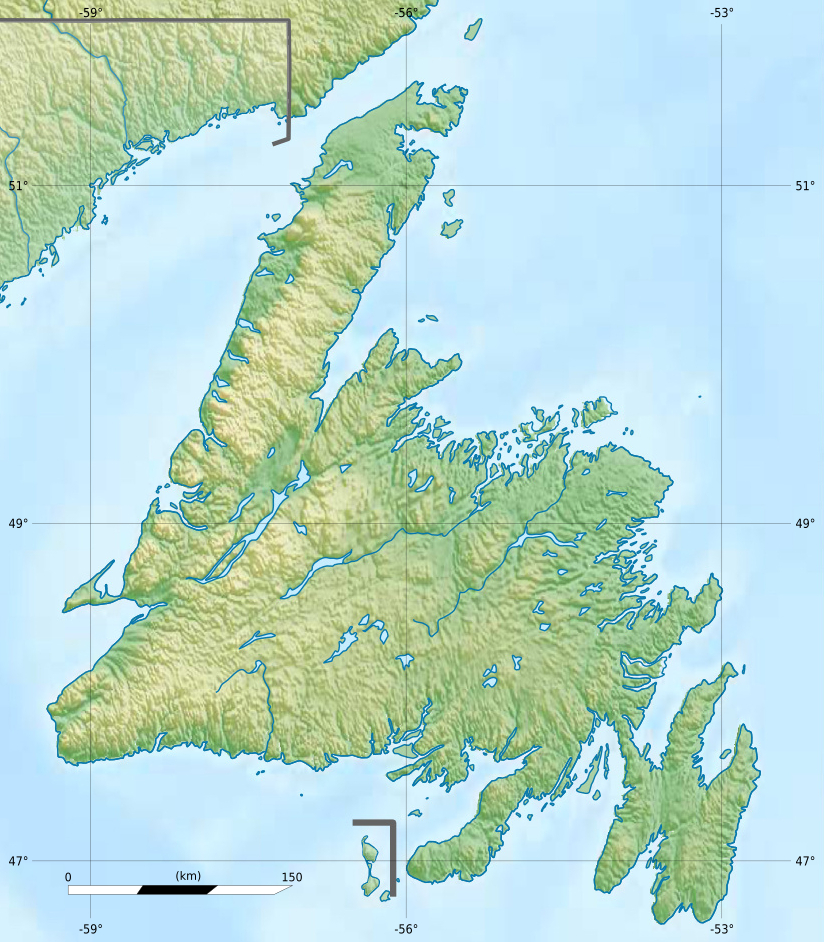
Position of Empire Energy's wreck on Newfoundland

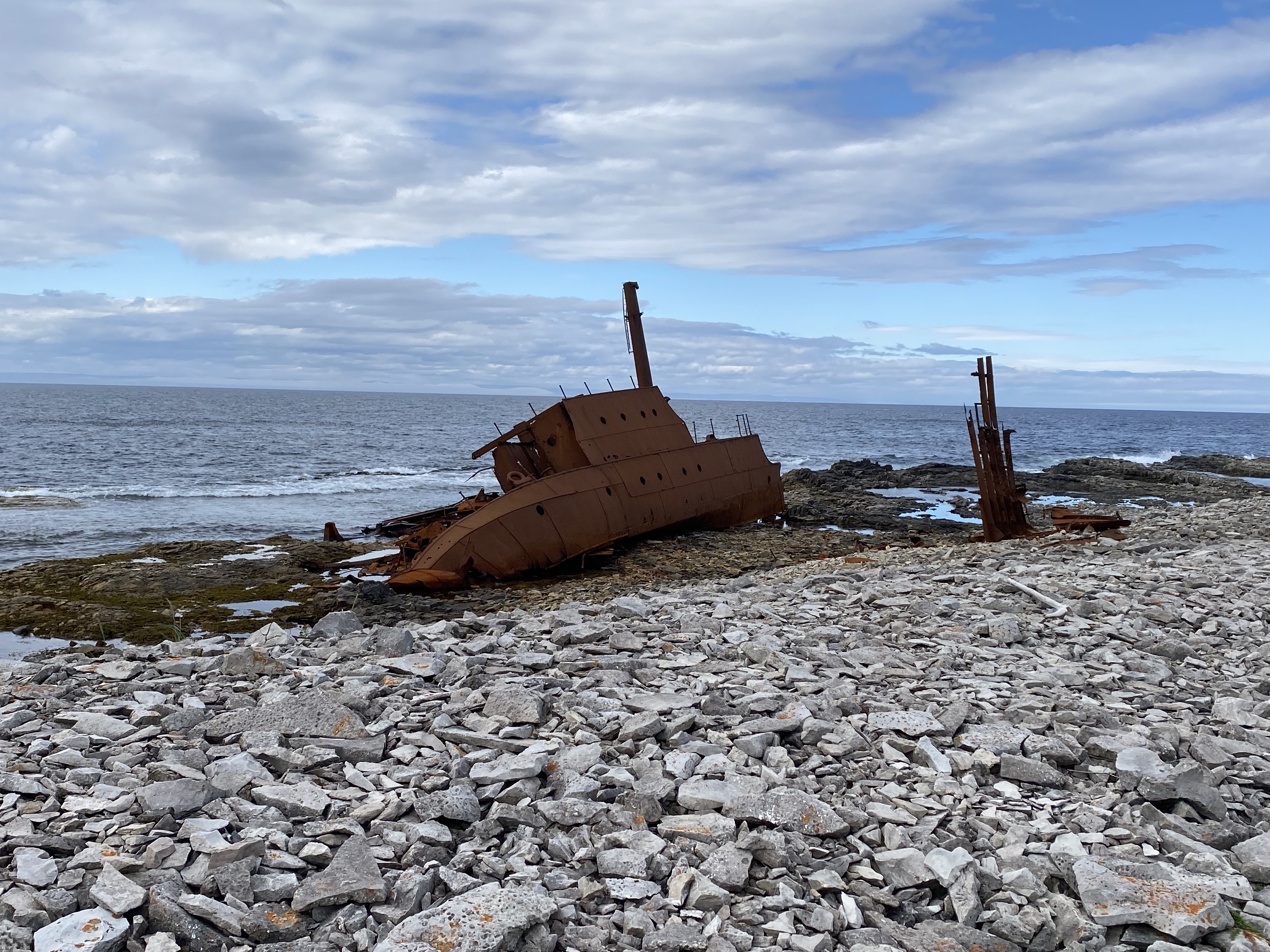
Empire Energy's wreck in 2009

On 29 October 1941, Empire Energy left Sydney with Convoy SC 52, but on 3 November members of the Raubritter ("Robber Baron") wolfpack attacked the convoy. U-202 sank Flynderborg and Gretavale; U-203 sank Empire Gemsbuck and Everoja; and the surviving ships turned back. On 5 November the convoy got back to Sydney, except for Empire Energy, which on that day ran aground at Big Brook, near the northernmost point of Newfoundland, at position 51°31′45.50″N 56°07′21.15″W. All of her crew survived, but she was declared a total loss. As of 2009, her wreck was still on the shore.

== Bibliography ==
- Lloyd's Register of Shipping. Vol. II.–Steamers and Motor Vessels. London: Lloyd's Register of Shipping. 1922 – via Internet Archive.
- Lloyd's Register of Shipping. Vol. II.–Steamers and Motorships. London: Lloyd's Register of Shipping. 1924 – via Internet Archive.
- Lloyd's Register of Shipping. Vol. I.–Sailing Vessels. London: Lloyd's Register of Shipping. 1925 – via Internet Archive.
- Lloyd's Register of Shipping. Vol. II.–Steamers and Motorships of 300 tons gross and over. London: Lloyd's Register of Shipping. 1930 – via Southampton City Council.
- Lloyd's Register of Shipping. Vol. I.–Sailing Vessels. London: Lloyd's Register of Shipping. 1933 – via Internet Archive.
- Lloyd's Register of Shipping. Vol. II.–Steamers and Motorships of 300 tons gross and over. London: Lloyd's Register of Shipping. 1934 – via Southampton City Council.
- Lloyd's Register of Shipping. Vol. II.–Steamers and Motorships over 300 tons. London: Lloyd's Register of Shipping. 1935 – via Southampton City Council.
- Lloyd's Register of Shipping. Vol. II.–Steamers and Motorships of 300 tons gross and over. London: Lloyd's Register of Shipping. 1941 – via Southampton City Council.
- Mitchell, WH; Sawyer, LA (1995). The Empire Ships. London, New York, Hamburg, Hong Kong: Lloyd's of London Press Ltd. ISBN 1-85044-275-4.
