= SS Hestmanden =

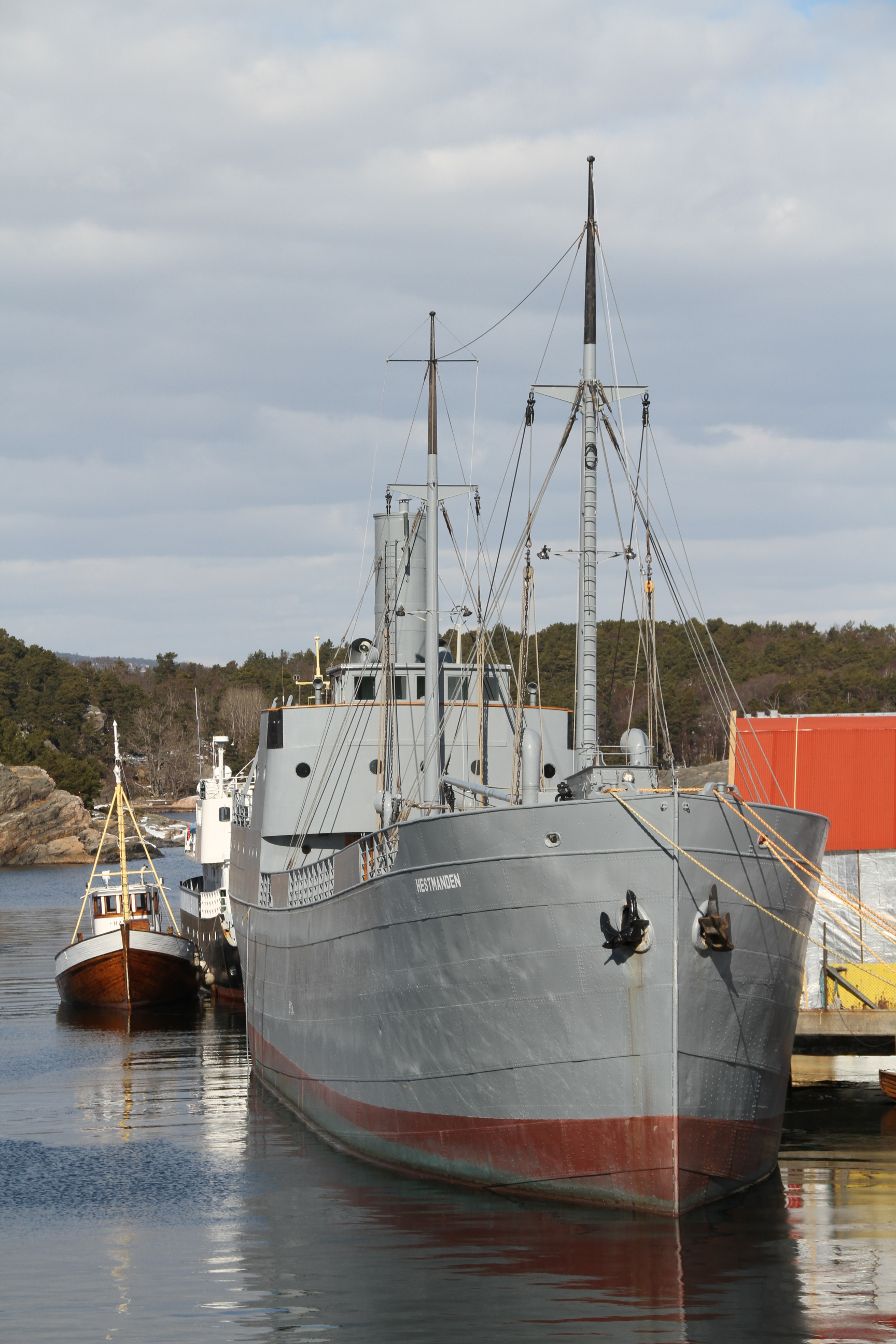

History

Norway
- Name: Hestmanden
- Namesake: Hestmannen
- Owner: 1911–1955: Vesteraalens Dampskibsselskab; 1955–1979: Høvding Skipsopphugging; 1979–1992: Norsk Veteranskibsklub; 1992–present: Stiftelsen Hestmanden
- Port of registry: (Norway) Stokmarknæs
- Builder: Laxevaags Maskin & Jernskibsbyggeri, Bergen
- Launched: 1911
- Fate: Restored
- Status: Museum ship

General characteristics
- Displacement: 979 tons
- Length: 195 feet
- Beam: 30 feet

Norwegian war sailor museum
- Norsk krigsseilermuseum
- Established: 2017
- Location: Bredalsholmen Shipyard, Kristiansand
- Type: War memorial and museum of wartime sailing
- Website: D/S Hestmanden

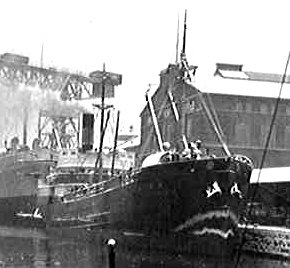
SS Hestmanden in Oslo in 1936

SS Hestmanden is a Norwegian steamer, which since 2017 has served as Norsk krigsseilermuseum (the Norwegian War Sailor Museum) and a national memorial for the War Sailors. Hestmanden is the only preserved cargo ship that has sailed in convoys during both World War I and World War II. It is the only remaining ship of the more than 1,000 that were part of the Nortraship fleet during World War II, and therefore represents a central part of Norway's war history and maritime history. Called "the lucky ship", as it survived convoys in two world wars, Hestmanden is considered Norway's most valuable veteran ship. The ship is still sailing under its own power, to spread the history of the War Sailors effort.

== World War I service ==
Hestmanden was built in Laksevåg for the Vesteraalens Dampskibsselskab (VDS) in 1911 and was used on this company's costal cargo route between Bergen and Tromsø until 1915, when it began transporting coal between United Kingdom and France. In 1917, Hestmanden was leased by the British Shipping Controller and given a British crew. As such, the ship sailed in British coastal waters, but also in convoys to France as well as to Arkhangelsk in Russia, to support the Allied intervention in the Russian Civil War.

== World War II service ==
From 1924 to 1940, Hestmanden once again transported goods along the Norwegian coast for VDS, from Oslo all the way up to Kirkenes. When Germany invaded Norway on 9 April 1940, the ship was on route northwards and was commandeered by the Norwegian Navy to transport soldiers and equipment to northern Norway. A month later, Hestmanden was in Tromsø unloading coal from Svalbard, when it was ordered, like all Norwegian ships not in German controlled waters, to sail to the United Kingdom, where it was put into service for Nortraship. Due to its age and relative small size, the ship mainly went in convoys in British waters during the war. It was back in Norway in June 1945.

== After World War II ==
Between 1947 and 1955, Hestmanden was once again used as domestic coastal freighter for the owners. In 1955, VDS sold the ship to a ship breaking company, which renamed it Vegafjord and used it for transporting scrap metal from broken up German war ship wrecks located in Norway, such as Tirpitz and U-843. In 1964, the ship breaking company retired and moored the ship near Sandnessjøen.

== Sailing museum ==
In a rather dilapidated condition, Vegafjord was bought by the Norsk Veteranskipsklubb (a Norwegian club for veteran vessels) in 1979. In 1995 the restoration work started at the Bredalsholmen Veteranship Shipyard in Kristiansand.

The idea was to turn the ship into a sailing museum, travelling along the coast of Norway as a memorial of the Norwegian wartime sailors.

In September 2011, she was "re-launched" from the yard and re-baptised Hestmanden, with Kristiansand as its home port. During the baptism ceremony, King Harald V of Norway was present, together with 240 War Sailors.

After 2011, further restoration and upgrading has been carried out.

In 2021, Hestmanden was frequently used for on-board and sailing scenes during the shooting of the Norwegian feature film War Sailor, which was released on cinema in 2022 and on Netflix in 2023.

In 2021 D/S Hestmanden, sailing under her own steam-power, embarked on a voyage along the Norwegian Coast, from Kristiansand to Tromsø.

== Timeline ==
- 1911: Delivered to Vesteraalens Dampskibsselskab (VDS).
- 1913: First international transport.
- 1917: (World War I) Leased to the British authorities.
- 1919: The lease terminated, the ship returned to VDS.
- 1940: (World War II) Sailed to Scotland in June and was incorporated into Nortraship.
- 1947: Repaired and modernised at Akers Mekaniske Verksted, Oslo.
- 1955: Sold to ship breaking company Høvding Skipsopphugging and renamed "Vegafjord".
- 1965: In mooring.
- 1979: Purchased and saved by the Norsk Veteranskibsklubb, funded by Petter Olsen.
- 1982: Towed to Trondheim, up to and including 1986 conservation project to stop further decay.
- 1992: Towed to Bredalsholmen in Kristiansand. The work started with the granting of money for restoration.
- 1995: The Storting (The Norwegian Parliament) gave SS Hestmanden status as a war memorial.
- 1996: The ship was made a cultural heritage site by the Norwegian Directorate for Cultural Heritage and Stiftelsen Hestmanden took over the ship.
- 2002: The hull is completely restored.
- 2008: Restoration work stopped at the end of the year due to lack of funding.
- 2011: Re-launched and renamed after restoration, both exactly one hundred years after the first time.
- 2012: A documentary about SS Hestmanden was finished in November.
- 2017: Officially opened as Norsk krigsseilermuseum (the Norwegian War Sailor Museum).
- 2020: Moved under own steam with original engine for the first time since 1964.
- 2021: Sailed from Kristiansand to Tromsø.

== Gallery ==
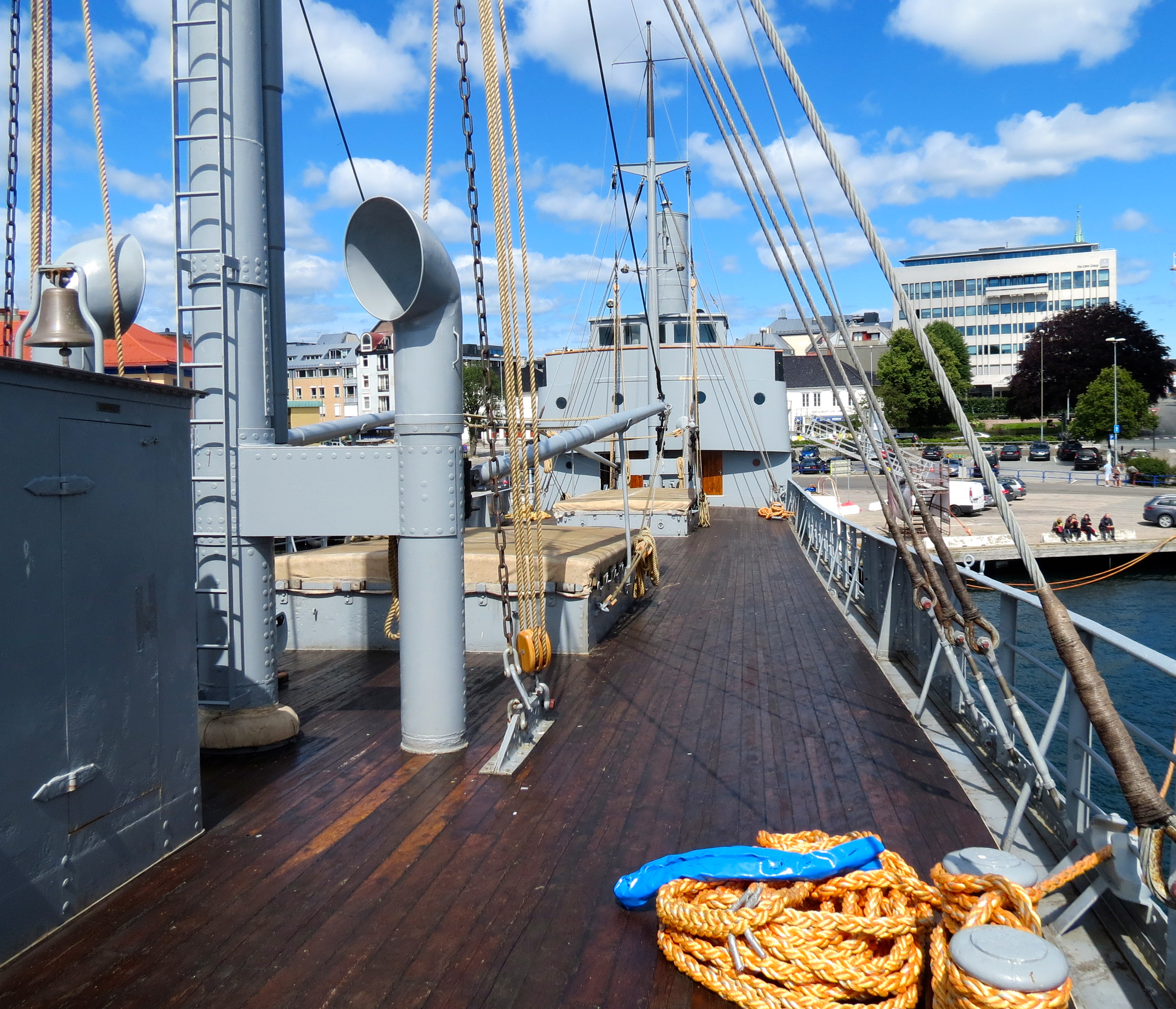
The deck is of wood

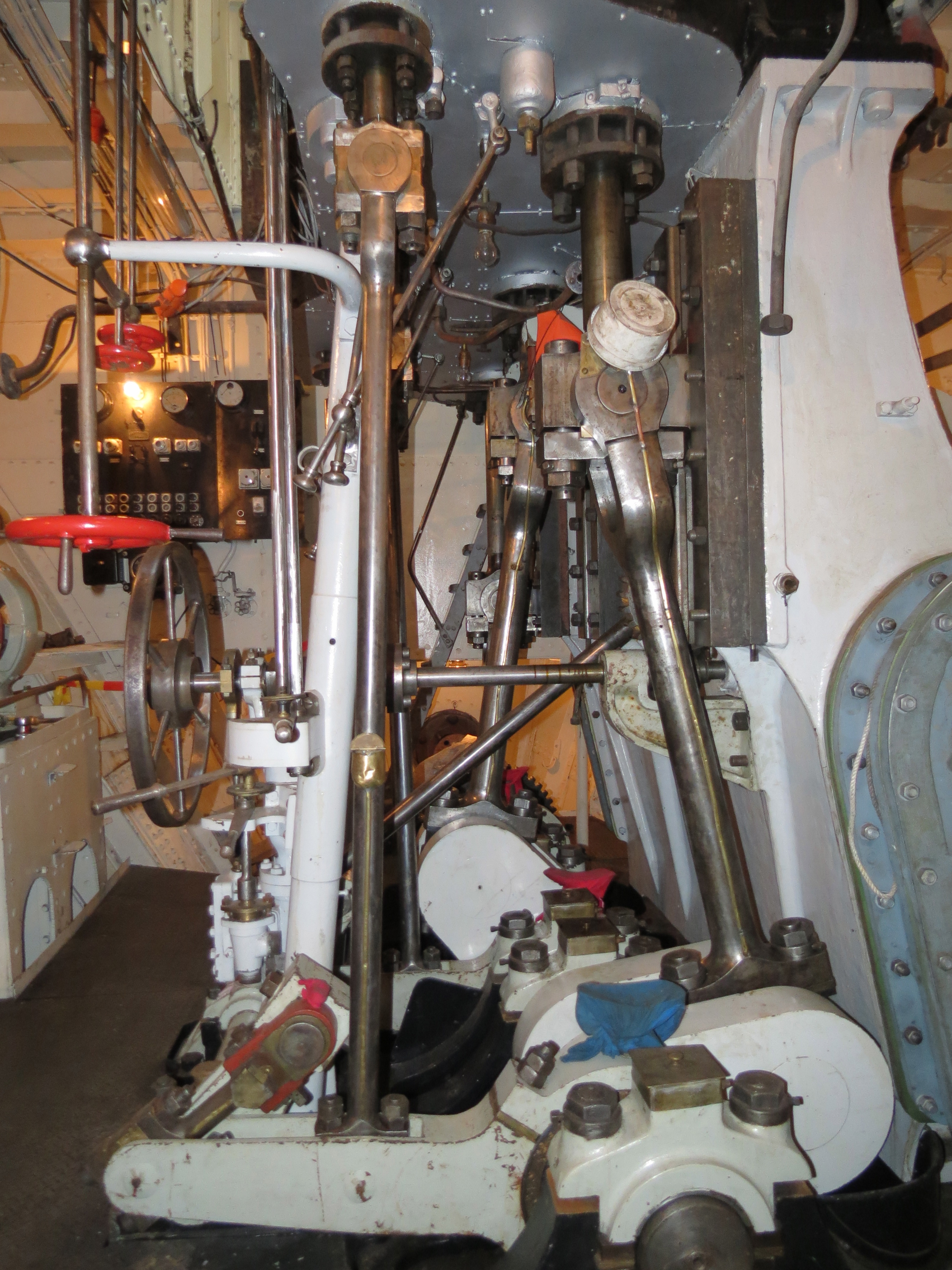
Detail from the original steam engine

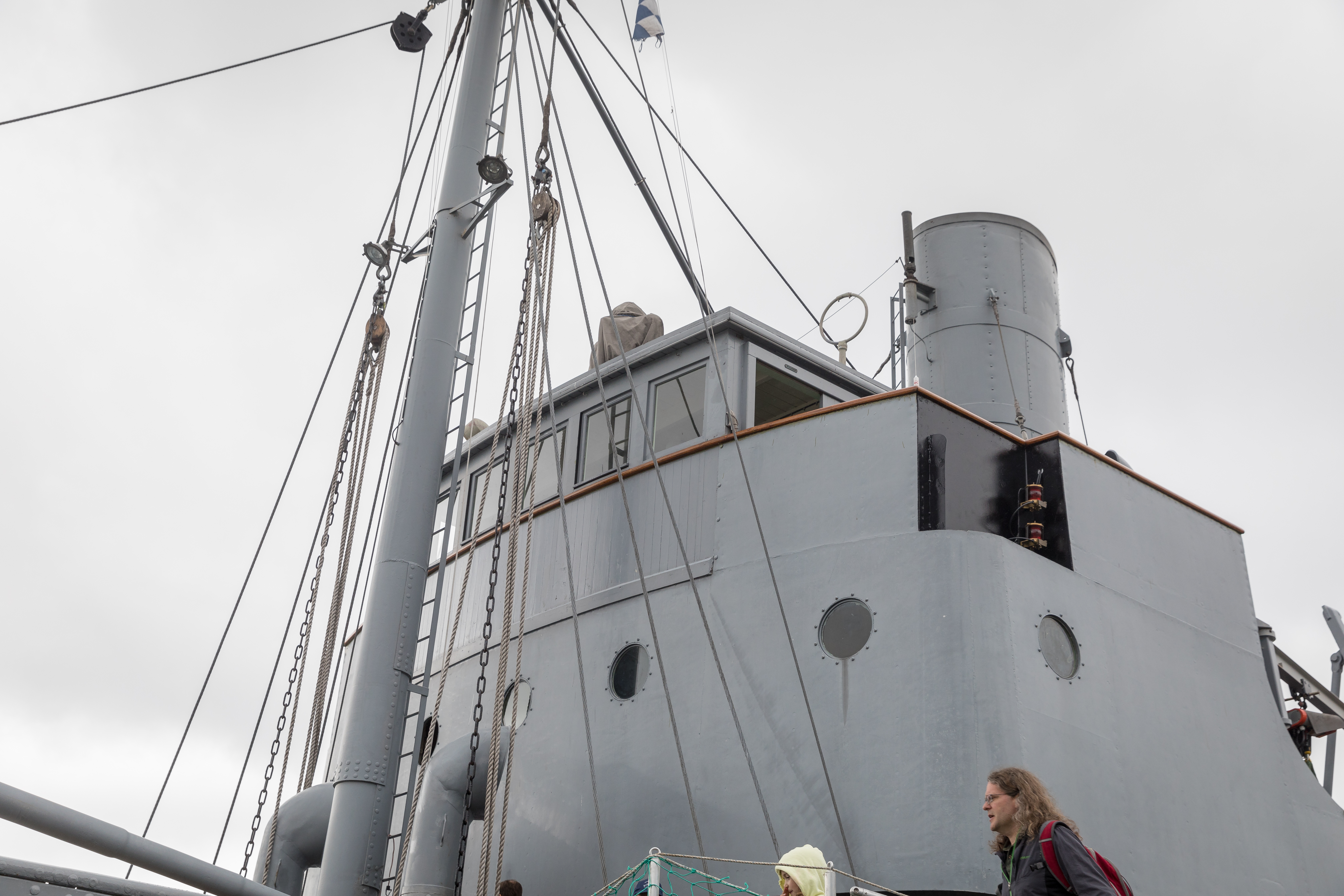
The wheelhouse

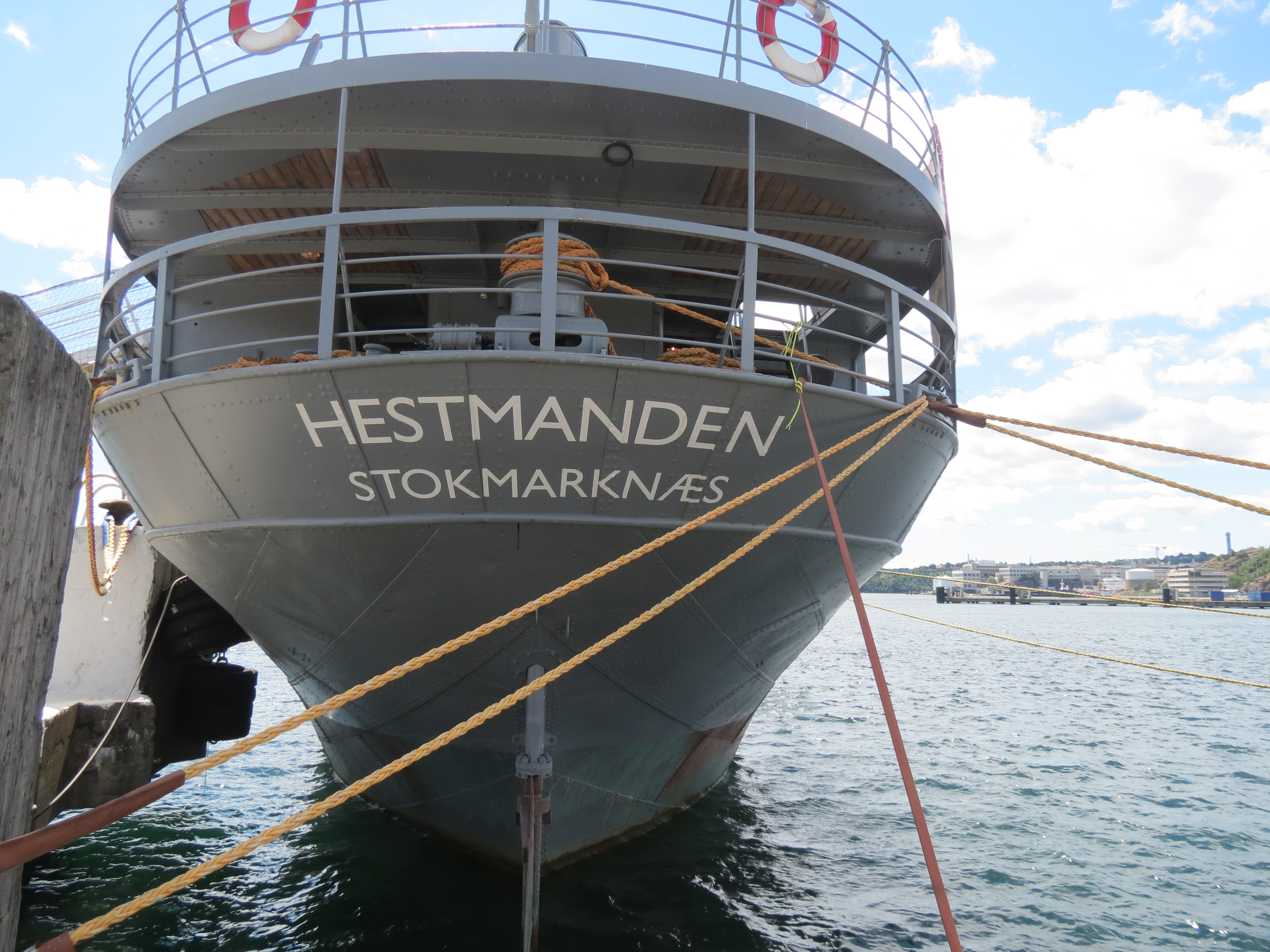
The counter stern
