= Sigurd Maseng =

Norwegian diplomat

Sigurd Maseng (born March 1, 1894 - died April 20, 1952) was a diplomat in the Norwegian Foreign Service. Raised in Oslo, he entered the Foreign Service in 1918. He was sent to the United States in 1936 to serve as the Vice-Consul in Chicago, home of a large Norwegian community. In 1947 he was promoted to the post of Consul General, which he served as until his death in 1952. He was a commander of the Order of the British Empire and a Knight, First Class, of the Order of St. Olav.

His brother Einar Maseng was also a Norwegian diplomat.
