= Helge Haavind =

Norwegian barrister

Helge Haavind (1 February 1917 – 15 March 1985) was a Norwegian barrister.

He was born in Kristiania as a son of Thor Haavind (1882–1950) and Kristine Kjelstrup (1884–1964). His father was a barrister and board member of Norske Liv. Helge Haavind finished his secondary education in 1935, attended Oslo Commerce School to 1936 and graduated from the University of Oslo with the cand.jur. degree in 1941. He worked as an investigator for the prize police in Oslo from 1941 to 1942, then as a secretary for Riksskattestyret. In 1942 he married Laura Elisabeth Steen Knudsen. This was during the occupation of Norway by Nazi Germany (1940–1945), and Helge Haavind was imprisoned in Grini concentration camp from 6 February to 2 May 1945. His father was imprisoned in Grini at the same time, from 25 November 1944 to the war's end in May 1945.

After the war Helge Haavind had a career in law, banking and insurance. He was a deputy judge in Drammen District Court from 1945 to 1946, then became a junior solicitor in a law firm. From 1950 he was a barrister (with access to work with Supreme Court cases) and partner in the law firm Arnesen, Haavind, Haavind, Dahl & Bjelke.

He was also the chairman of Forsikringsselskapet Pallas, Norsk Rengjøringsselskap and from 1968 to 1972 in Filharmonisk Selskap. He was deputy chairman of Andresens Bank until the merger with Kreditkassen in 1980. He was a board member of the Norwegian Opera Fund and the Norwegian Bar Association, and the supervisory councils of Skip-A/S Ocean, Skips-A/S Hav and Skips-A/S Havtank. He died in 1985.
