= Christian Stray =

Norwegian lawyer and politician

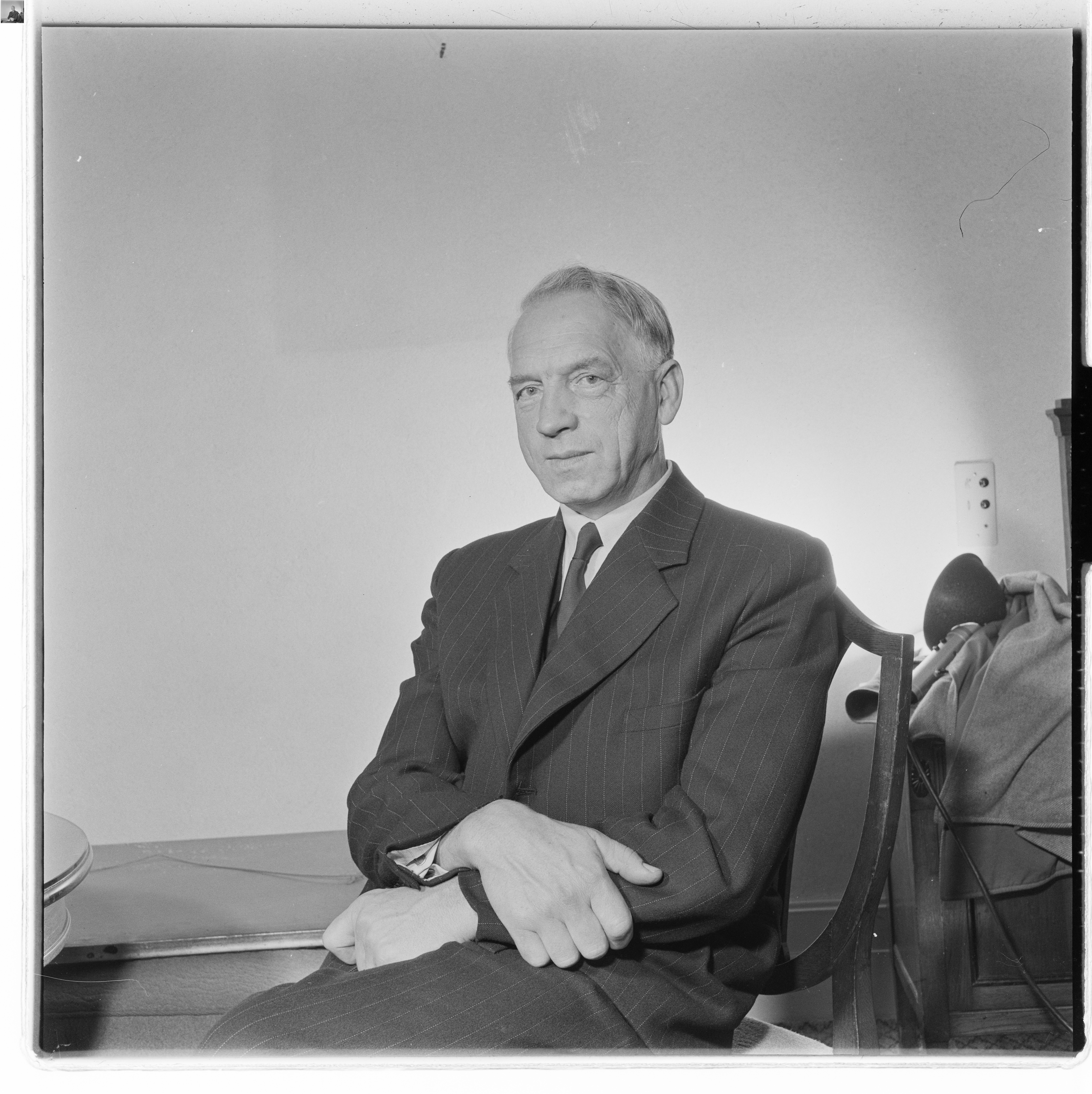
- Born: 14 January 1894; Christianssand, Norway
- Died: 31 July 1981 (aged 87)
- Occupations: Lawyer and politician
- Spouse: Sigrid Stray (m. 1921)

Christian Stray (14 January 1894 – 31 July 1981) was a Norwegian lawyer and politician for the Liberal Party.

He was born in Christianssand as a son of timber merchant and shipowner Thorkild Marthinius Stray (1852–1912) and his wife Marie Nodeland (1859–1947). He finished his secondary education at Christianssand Cathedral School in 1912, and graduated with the cand.jur. degree in 1919. From 1918 to 1919 he chaired the student's society Juristforeningen. In between he had served in the Royal Norwegian Navy, and held the rank of premier lieutenant from 1918. From 1919 to 1920 he was a subeditor of newspaper Norske Intelligenz-Seddeler, and from 1920 to 1923 he was a secretary in the Ministry of Justice and auxiliary judge in Sunnfjord District Court. In 1923 he settled in Arendal as an attorney; from 1927 a barrister with access to work with Supreme Court cases.

In March 1921 in Sandnes he married Sigrid Kluge. In 1924 they had the daughter Signe Marie; she married later Chief Justice Rolv Ryssdal in 1954.

Stray became involved in politics while studying. He was deputy mayor of Tromøy from 1928 to 1931, and mayor from 1931 to 1934. He was then a regular member of the municipal council from 1934 to 1945. He was elected to the Parliament of Norway from Aust-Agder in 1933 and 1936, serving two terms. He was a member of the Standing Committee on Justice. In 1939 he became a national board member of the Liberal Party. His position was suspended in 1940, as Parliament and all political parties save Nasjonal Samling were prohibited, as a part of the occupation of Norway by Nazi Germany. Stray himself was arrested by the Nazis on 22 February 1944. After some time in Kristiansand prison, he was incarcerated at Grini concentration camp from 11 March to 7 September. He was released then, but the Nazis intended to arrest him again on 1 November the same year. However, because of Stray's health at the time, it was decided to keep him in house arrest. He was liberated at the war's end in May 1945.

After the war he returned as mayor of Tromøy from 1956 to 1959. He was also chairman of the committee that prepared the Tromøy Bridge from 1938 to 1961, as well as of the board in the Arendal newspaper Agderposten. He was the sole owner of the newspaper for many years, having started in 1936 when he, together with two associates, took over Agderposten by buying shares in the company with the same name. It was inherited by his daughter. He died in July 1981.
