= Egil Eriksen =

Norwegian politician

Egil Johan Marius Eriksen (20 April 1909 – 2 November 1996) was a Norwegian educator and politician for the Labour Party.

He was born in Solum Municipality as a son of mason Kristian Eriksen (1873–1935) and housewife Birgitte Syse (1867–1933). He finished his secondary education in 1927 and graduated from the University of Oslo with the cand.real. degree in 1934. While studying he was a teacher at Skotfoss primary school from 1931 to 1932. After graduation, he was a teacher at Vahl Upper Secondary School in Oslo from 1935 to 1936, and then worked at the upper secondary school in Mandal from 1936 to 1946. He was acting principal in two periods. During the occupation of Norway by Nazi Germany he was arrested in June 1944. He was held in Arkivet until 11 November 1944, then in Berg concentration camp to the occupation's end in May 1945. He was later a principal in Bø Municipality from 1948 to 1953 and in Mandal from 1953 to 1976.

He was a member of the municipal council of Mandal Municipality from 1945 to 1948, and also a deputy representative to the Parliament of Norway from the Market towns of Vest-Agder and Rogaland counties during the term 1945–1949. As Sven Oftedal was named to Gerhardsen's Second Cabinet in December 1945, Eriksen filled his seat. This would become permanent in June 1948, as Oftedal died and Eriksen advanced to being a full representative. He was a member of the Standing Committee on Education and Church Affairs. While living in Bø he chaired the local party chapter from 1951 to 1953. He was later a member of the municipal council of Mandal Municipality from 1955 to 1963 and 1967 to 1971.
