= Arne Askildsen =

Norwegian politician

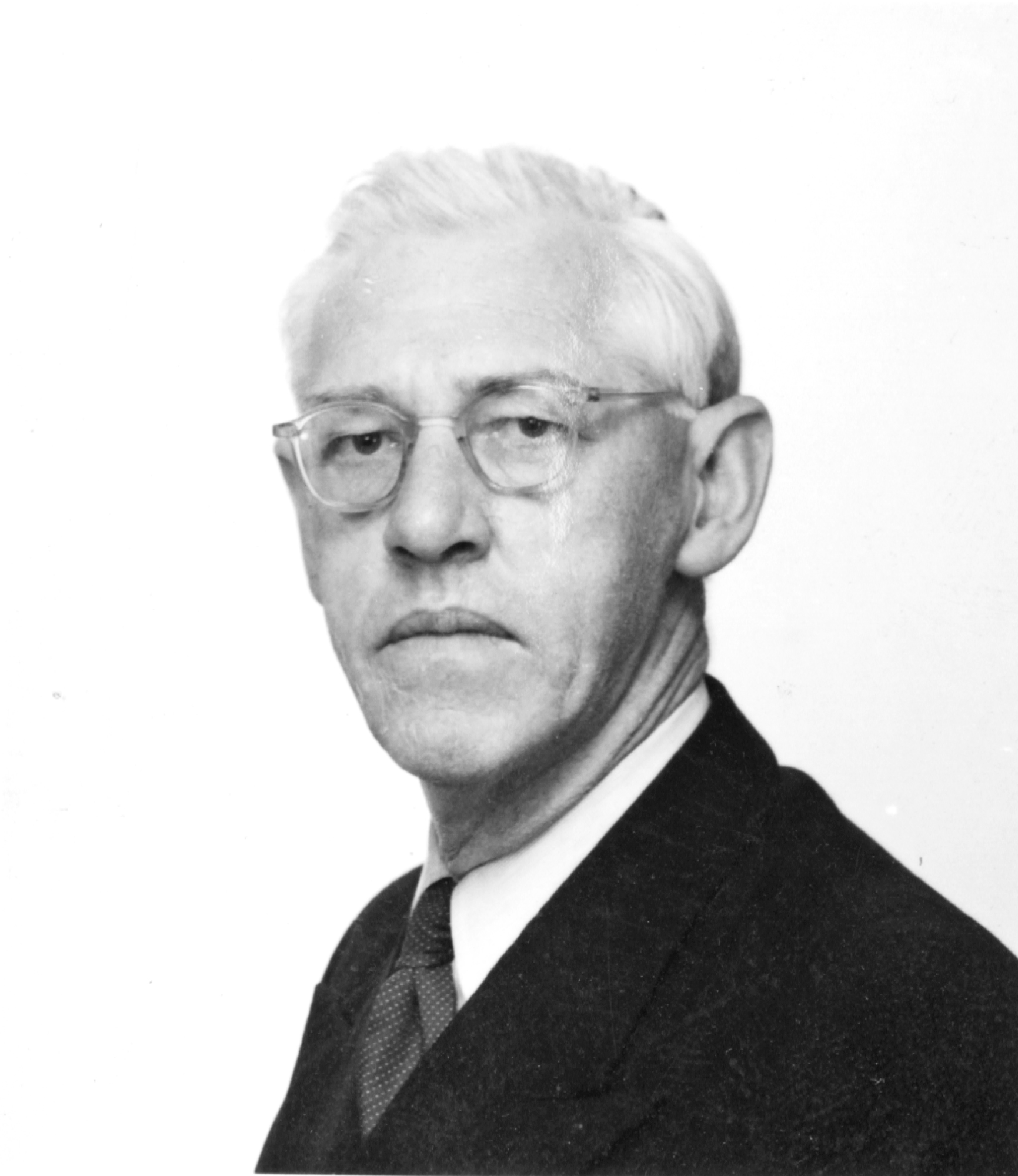
Image of Arne Askildsen

Arne Askildsen (25 August 1898 – 12 July 1982) was a Norwegian bailiff and politician for the Christian Democratic Party.

He was born in Kristiansand as a son of Albert Askildsen (1860–1947) and Oline Gunhilde Paulsen (1865–1922). He took commerce school in 1916. From 1914 he worked as an office clerk in Lister og Mandal county, before being hired as bailiff for the town of Mandal and in Halse og Harkmark Municipality in 1928. He remained in this position until 1968, except for the years during the occupation of Norway by Nazi Germany. He was imprisoned in Arkivet from 25 February to 6 March 1942, then a second time from 20 June 1944. He managed to escape from prison on 20 July 1944. He worked at the Norwegian legation in Stockholm from 1944 to 1945. Two of his sons were held captive in Grini concentration camp.

Askildsen was a member of Mandal school board from 1936 to 1940 and 1947 to 1951. He was a member of the city council from 1936 to 1940, 1945 to 1947 and 1951 to 1963. In 1953 he was elected to the Parliament of Norway from Vest-Agder, and sat through one term. He was also a board member of the Norwegian Lutheran Mission from 1939 to 1955 and 1958 to 1964.

Together with Aasta Håverstad (1898–1978) he had the son Kjell Askildsen (1929–2021), a noted writer. He was decorated as a Knight of the Order of the White Rose of Finland in 1937.
