= Kristian Lerche Bøckman =

Norwegian mining director

Kristian Lerche Bøckman (11 March 1887 – 1974) was a Norwegian mining director.

He was born in Skånevik Municipality, finished his secondary education in 1905, attended the Norwegian Military Academy for one year, and graduated from the Royal Frederick University with a mining degree in 1911. He worked as a mining engineer in South Africa from 1912 to 1915, then successively in Norway, Chile, Peru and Bolivia. He returned to Norway in 1928.

From 1928 to 1934 he was a professor at the Norwegian Institute of Technology, and from 1937 to 1944 he was the manager of Røros Copper Works. During the occupation of Norway by Nazi Germany he was imprisoned in Vollan concentration camp from 13 June 1944, then in Grini concentration camp from 8 July 1944 to 13 March 1945. He was held in Mysen until the occupation's end in May 1945.

From 1945 to 1957 he was the director of mining in Nordland county. He died in 1974.
