= Knut Gard =

Knut Einar Dag Gard (9 April 1905 – 29 March 1966) was a Norwegian dentist and organizational leader.

He was born in Stavanger as a son of Lieutenant Colonel Edw. Aug. Gundersen. He finished his secondary education in 1924 and finished officer's training. He was a Premier Lieutenant from 1927 and certified radio telegrapher from 1929. He spent the years 1929 to 1931 on whaling expedition in the Southern Sea. In 1934 he graduated from the Norwegian College of Odontology and started a career as a dentist in Drammen. In 1935 he moved to Oslo, and in 1936 he married dentist Liv Henriette Dunker Kjerulf.

He is best known as secretary-general of the Norwegian Dental Association from 1938 to his death. He was also a corresponding member of the Danish Dental Association from 1945, and later an honorary member of the American Dental Association, the Swedish Dental Society as well as their French, German, Austrian, Finnish and Irish counterparts. He was a board member of the FDI World Dental Federation from 1952, was vice president from 1958 and presided over the organization from 1965 to his death.

In the military, Gard was promoted to Captain in 1940. The same year Norway was occupied by Nazi Germany. In the early summer of 1941, 43 organizations endeavored to keep themselves from being usurped by the Nazis. Gard was involved in this so-called protest of the 43. Gard was arrested by the authorities in January 1942 and held in Grini concentration camp until the end of the month. In May 1943 he was arrested again, this time being moved from Grini to Schokken in June 1943. He was further imprisoned in Wollstein, Schildberg and Luckenwalde until the camps were liberated. He was decorated with the Defence Medal 1940–1945.

He also co-founded Norsk Studentsamband in 1938 and Norsk Akademikersamband in 1952, and chaired the Norwegian Specialized Press Association. He was also a supervisory council member of Norsk Kollektiv Pensjonskasse. He died in March 1966 was buried from Frogner Church at Vestre gravlund, where the Norwegian Dental Association also raised a monument to him and his wife.
