= Bernt A. Nissen =

Norwegian journalist (1892–1970)

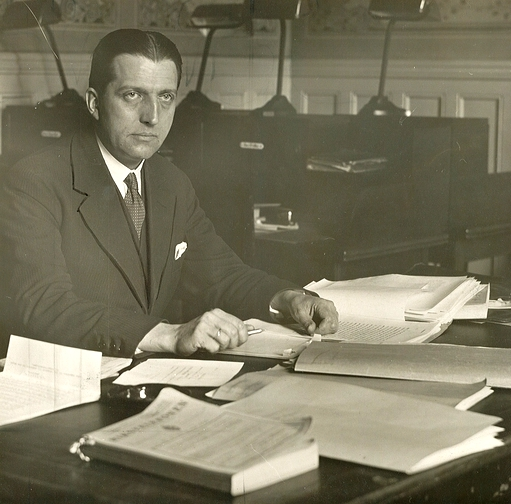
Bernt August Nissen, c. 1935

Bernt August Nissen (18 July 1892 – 17 June 1970) was a Norwegian journalist, biographer and film censor.

== Biography ==
He was born at Nes, Akershus, Norway. From 1921 to 1922, Nissen was correspondent for Verdens Gang in Paris. In 1922 he came to Stavanger Aftenblad as deputy editor when Lars Oftedal (1877–1932) left to pursue a position with the National Government. He was political editor of the newspaper Dagbladet from 1928 to 1931 after the departure of Einar Skavlan who became director for the National Theatre in Oslo.

From 1931 until 1962, he was head of the State Film Center (Statens Filmkontroll) which was in charge of rating movies. Since 2005, that function had been incorporated in the Norwegian Media Authority (Medietilsynet). He wrote a biography on politician Gunnar Knudsen in 1957, and two volumes of the book series Vårt folks historie from 1964. He was a member of the Norwegian Association for Women's Rights.

== Personal life ==
He was married in 1921 to Anna Helene Gustava Backer (1891–1968). He was decorated Knight, First Class of the Order of St. Olav in 1962. He died during 1970 in Oslo.
