= Per Græsli =

Norwegian resistance member (1903–1945)

Per Johan Græsli (23 February 1903 – 26 July 1945) was a Norwegian physician and resistance member.

He was born in Trondhjem to Ole Græsli (1880–1940) from Tydal Municipality and Ingeborg Kjersem (1876–1944). He was married, and lived in Hetland Municipality where he worked as a reserve physician at Rogaland Hospital.

During the occupation of Norway by Nazi Germany he joined the Norwegian resistance movement. He worked with spreading the illegal press, and was a member of the group Milorg where he worked in the sanitary division. He was arrested in Stavanger in July 1942. He was incarcerated in Grini concentration camp until 3 May 1943, except for a period at Arkivet from 17 August 1942 to 29 March 1943. In May 1943 he was transferred to Sachsenhausen concentration camp. At the hospital in Sachsenhausen, he was tasked with leading the department of internal medicine. He later built up the medical department in Neuengamme concentration camp.

He had contracted pneumonia for the first time in December 1943, and suffered several setbacks in 1944. In 1945 he was seriously ill and was sent to the Caroline Hospital in Stockholm, Sweden. Here he was awarded the Knighthood of the Order of St. Olav by Sven Oftedal in the summer of 1945. He died at the hospital in late July the same year.
