= Ragnvald Maseng =

Norwegian sport shooter (1891–1920)

Personal information
- Born: 21 October 1891 Askim, Norway
- Died: 4 July 1920 (aged 28) Bjoreio, Norway

Sport
- Sport: Sports shooting

Ragnvald Maseng (21 October 1891 – 4 July 1920) was a Norwegian sport shooter. He was born in Askim, and his club was Christiania Skytterlag. He competed in military rifle and small-bore rifle at the 1912 Summer Olympics in Stockholm. Maseng drowned while trying to wade across a river on the Hardangervidda.
