= Tor Njaa =

Norwegian resistance member (1912–1944)

Tor Njaa (23 October 1912 – 5 September 1944) was a Norwegian resistance member of World War II.

He was born in Flekkefjord, to a mother from Flekkefjord and a father from Time Municipality, and had attended middle school and commercial school. During the occupation of Norway by Nazi Germany, he joined the resistance movement. He was the leader of Milorg in the city of Flekkefjord, and was an important cooperator of Gunvald Tomstad. He also operated an illegal communication post.

He was arrested in August 1942, and imprisoned at Møllergata 19 until March 1943, except for some time in Kristiansand in early 1943. He then sat at Grini concentration camp from March to June 1943 and October to November 1943. He was then sent to Germany. He died in September 1944, en route to Natzweiler concentration camp.
