= Sverre J. Herstad =

Norwegian journalist and politician (1905–1999)

Sverre Johannes Herstad (24 April 1905 – 29 August 1999) was a Norwegian journalist and politician.

He was born in Trondhjem as a son of police officer Sivert Herstad (1864–1950) and Jonetta Andersson (1864–1942). In 1936 he married Hjørdis Selboe.

He finished his secondary education in 1925 and graduated from the Royal Frederick University with the cand.oecon. degree in 1928. He became a journalist in the same year, in the Liberal newspaper Nidaros. He moved to Adresseavisen in 1930 and advanced to editor in 1936. He remained here until his retirement in 1975.

Herstad was arrested several times during the occupation of Norway by Nazi Germany. He was imprisoned in Falstad concentration camp from March to June 1942, and from October to December 1942. He was later arrested in October 1944, and placed in Vollan concentration camp. After less than two weeks he was transferred to Berg concentration camp until the war's end. After the war he issued the book about Berg, titled Quislings hønsegård, together with Carl Haave.

Herstad was a vice chairman of the Student Society in Trondheim (without actually studying in the city). In the press, he was a national board member of the Norwegian Press Association and chaired the Trøndelag branch. Herstad was a motor and transport journalist, under the pseudonym "Mr. Clutch", and in the Royal Norwegian Automobile Club he was a member of the national board and chaired the supervisory council. He received the honorary token of the Royal Norwegian Automobile Club as well as the Norwegian Automobile Federation and the Norwegian Council for Road Safety. He also chaired the supervisory council of Strinden Sparebank (later Sparebanken Midt-Norge). He was elected to the executive committee of the municipal council of Strinda Municipality, and later after the municipal merger, he was part of the municipal council for Trondheim Municipality. He was also on the Sør-Trøndelag county council, representing the Conservative Party. He was decorated with the King's Medal of Merit in gold.

He resided in Singsaker. He died in August 1999, aged 94.
