= Edmund Norén =

Norwegian media executive and politician

Edmund Emil Norén (27 August 1902 – 1983) was a Norwegian media executive and politician for the Labour Party.

== Biography ==
He was born in Drøbak as a son of gardener Emil Johan Norén (1872–1930) and Ingeborg Andersen (1879–1941). He married a tailor's daughter in 1930.

His education was middle school. He started as an office clerk in Christiania Portland Cementfabrik in 1920. He started working for the labour movement as manager of Bergens Arbeiderblad in 1927, and went on to Fremtiden. Here he worked from 1930 to 1946, except for the period when the newspaper was shut down because of the occupation of Norway by Nazi Germany. He was imprisoned twice during the war. The first time, he was incarcerated in Møllergata 19 from 20 November to 11 December 1941. The second time, he was first taken to Møllergata 19, on 29 September 1942, and then sat in Grini concentration camp from 4 December 1942. He was then held in Sachsenhausen concentration camp from 4 November 1943 until the camp was liberated. After the war, he was the chief executive officer of Arbeiderbladet from 1946 to 1955 and director of Avisenes Informasjonskontor from 1956 to 1970.

He was the chairman of Arbeiderpressens Samvirke, the Norske Avisutgiveres Landsforbund and Osloavisenes forening and was a board member of Norsk Medisinaldepot. He also held political positions.

In 1970 he was decorated as a Knight, First Class of the Order of St. Olav. He died in 1978.
