= Arne Jostein Ingebrethsen =

Norwegian newspaper editor and resistance member

Arne Jostein Ingebrethsen (9 July 1903 – 7 January 1945) was a Norwegian newspaper editor who was killed during the occupation of Norway by Nazi Germany.

His father Ingolf Ingebrethsen was a long-time editor of the newspaper Flekkefjordsposten. After the German invasion of Norway, the newspaper showed an uncooperative attitude towards the authorities. For an article printed on 1 August 1940, Arne Jostein Ingebrethsen was arrested and was incarcerated at Møllergata 19 from 12 August to 14 October 1940.

His father backed down as editor, and Ingebrethsen served as editor from 1941 to 1943. He was arrested again in 1943, and was imprisoned at Møllergata 19 from 14 July to 6 August, and then in Grini concentration camp until 13 November. He was then shipped to concentration camps on the European continent. He spent time in Natzweiler-Struthof, Mauthausen and Melk, and died here in January 1945. Two of his brothers succeeded him as editor.

One of his sisters was married to Andreas Holmsen for a period.
