= Rolv Ryssdal =

Norwegian judge

Rolv Einar Rasmussen Ryssdal (27 October 1914 – 18 February 1998) was a Norwegian judge.

From 1969 to 1984 he was the 16th chief justice of the Supreme Court. He was Vice President of the European Court of Human Rights from 1981 to 1985 and President from 1985 to 1998.

He was married to Signe Marie Stray Ryssdal, and father of noted lawyer Anders Christian Stray Ryssdal.

Rolv Ryssdal was appointed Commander with Star of the Order of St. Olav in 1970. He was decorated with the Grand Cross in 1985.

In 1993 he was awarded the Fritt Ord Award.

Civic offices
Preceded by position created	Permanent under-secretary of state in the Ministry of Justice and the Police; 1956–1964	Succeeded by Kristian Bloch
Legal offices
Preceded by Terje Wold	Chief Justice of the Supreme Court of Norway; 1969–1984	Succeeded by Erling Sandene
Awards
Preceded by Annette Thommessen	Recipient of the Fritt Ord Award; 1993	Succeeded by William Nygaard
