= Einar Maseng =

Norwegian diplomat

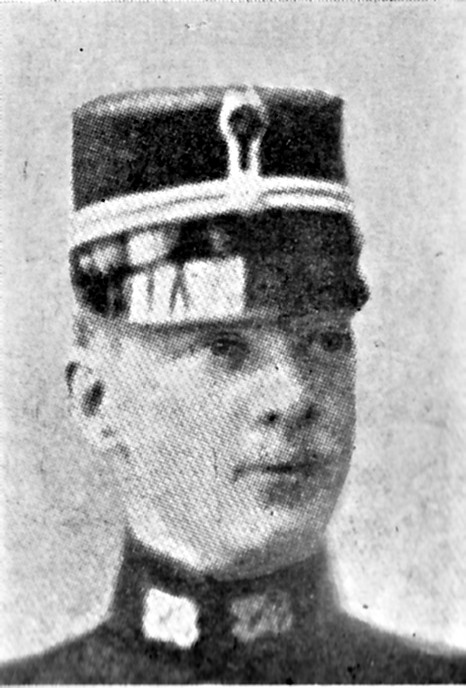
Einar Maseng.

Einar Maseng (1880–1972) was a Norwegian diplomat.

Born in Oslo, he was educated at the Norwegian Military Academy. He later entered the foreign service serving as a Consul General in Hamburg before later becoming the first Norwegian delegate to The Hague and a substitute delegate to the League of Nations. In the years leading up to the Second World War, Maseng was assigned the post of the Norwegian Ambassador to Moscow and the Soviet Union. At the onset of the war, he, along with several other Ambassadors, was forced to leave the Soviet Union due to the Molotov–Ribbentrop Pact.

After the war, Maseng was pressured to resign from the foreign service. There was a difference of opinion over whether Norway should become more participatory in world affairs or become more isolationist. A proponent of the isolationist theory, Maseng went on to write several books on the subject, which were re-released many years later.

Maseng had been a proponent of Nordic cooperation, especially during the First World War when the Nordic countries guarded their neutrality. He was a co-founder of Foreningen Norden in 1919.

Maseng was married several times, though never for a particularly long time. The most notable of his marriages were to Sigrid Maseng, who published a book about the Grini concentration camp in Norway, and to the Countess Hellevid Catharina Cecilia Posse, whom he married in 1929 while serving as the Consul General in Germany. His brother Sigurd Maseng was also a Norwegian diplomat.
