= Gunvald Strøm-Walseng =

Norwegian barrister (1889–1951)

Gunvald Strøm-Walseng (12 December 1889 – 1951) was a Norwegian barrister.

He was born in Sande i Vestfold. After his examen artium he attended the Norwegian Military Academy for some time, reaching the rank of Second Lieutenant in the Field Artillery in 1912. He commenced law studies and graduated with the cand.jur. degree in 1916. After two years as a deputy judge in Lier, Røyken and Hurum District Court he received a lawyer's licence in 1918. He joined the law firm of barrister Harald Wellén, and worked there from 1918 to 1925 before starting his own firm. He was the official town attorney of his new hometown Drammen from 1937, and was a prominent citizen there. He was also a district branch leader in the Norwegian Bar Association. He was a barrister with access to working with Supreme Court cases, and he led several cases which attracted national attention.

During the occupation of Norway by Nazi Germany, he was a member of the main Norwegian resistance group Milorg. He was arrested in October 1944 in Drammen, and initially held in cramp conditions with several other prisoners in a cell in the local exchange building Børsen. He was later imprisoned in Grini concentration camp from 19 December 1944 to the liberation of Norway. He died in January 1951, 61 years old.
