= Kristiansand Prison =

Former prison in Kristiansand, Norway

Coordinates: 58°08′50″N 7°59′52″E

Kristiansand Prison (Norwegian: Kristiansand fengsel) was a prison in Kristiansand, Norway. It was the southernmost prison in the country. It belonged to the Norwegian Correctional Service.

It had a capacity of 44 inmates and was located on the top two floors of the police house in the city. The prison was closed in June 2020, at the same time as Agder Prison in Mandal, with a capacity of 100 inmates, was opened.

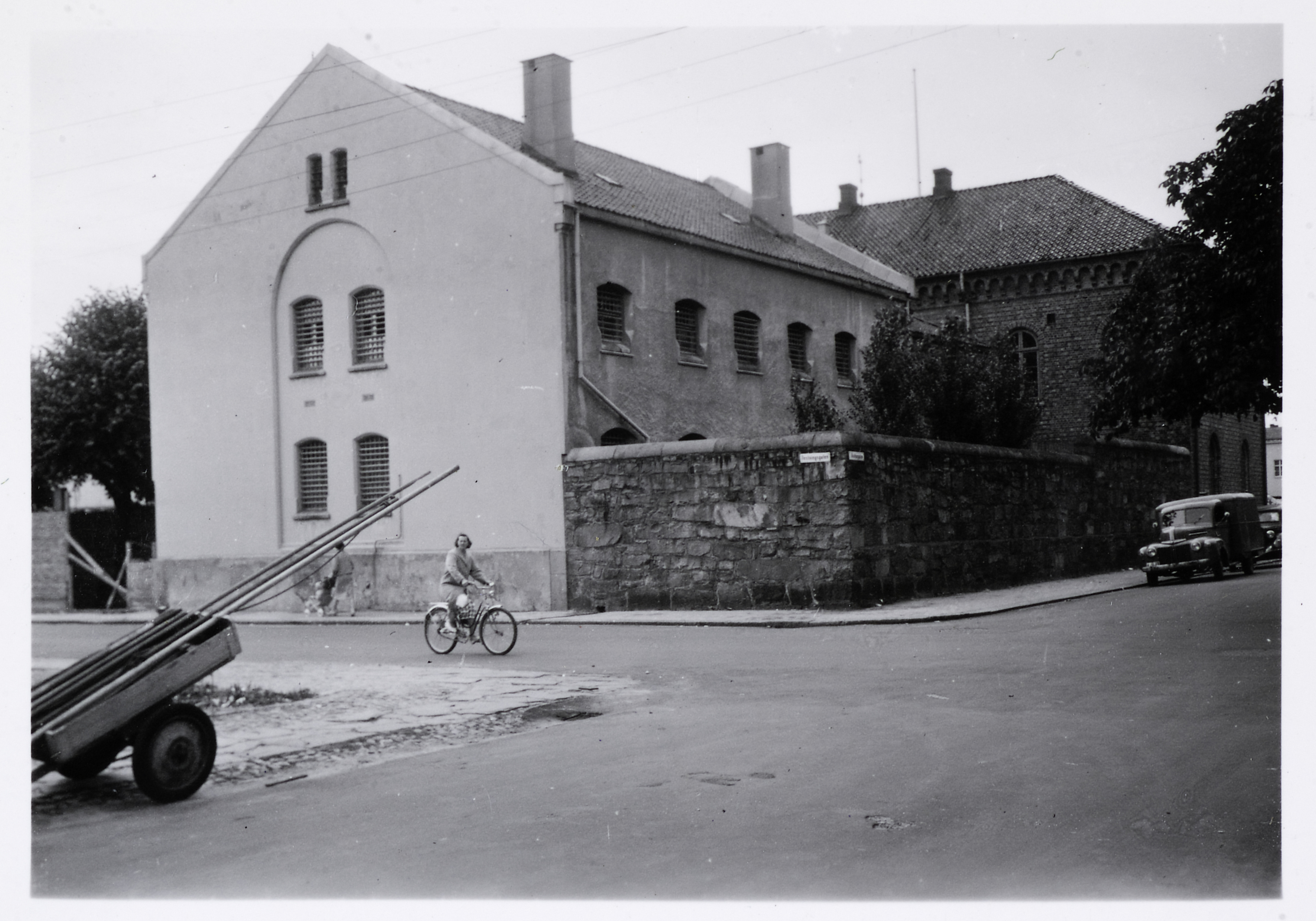
Kristiansand Jailhouse in 1960. Photo: National Archival Services of Norway

The prison replaced a local jailhouse in 1977. The jailhouse was built in 1864 as part of the town hall. Running prisons was at the time a municipal responsibility. This prison was intended for shorter prison stays and custody. It gradually became too small and inappropriate, and was an obstacle to an extension of the street nearby. The building was therefore demolished.
