= Agderposten =

Norwegian newspaper

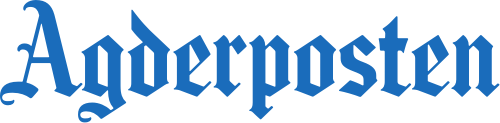
- Type: Daily newspaper
- Format: Tabloid
- Owner: Agderposten Medier
- Editor: Øyvind Klausen
- Founded: 1874
- Political alignment: Liberal Party (1874–1972); Liberal People's Party (1972–????); Independent (present)
- Headquarters: Arendal
- Circulation: 19,853 (2013)
- Website: www.agderposten.no

Agderposten is a daily newspaper published in Arendal, Norway.

== History and profile ==
Agderposten was founded by teacher Jens Svendsen and published for the first time on 1 July 1874. Svendsen was the owner and editor-in-chief until 1919. His son Jens Svendsen Jr. was a co-editor for a couple of years. Later editors were Jens Vevstad from 1919 to 1928, Magne Torsvik from 1928 to 1936, then Robert Knudsen. Regarding ownership, a stock company named Agderposten was set up in 1919. Among the members of the board of directors were Torjus Værland. In 1936 a new team of owners took over; Robert Knudsen, Alv Kristiansen and Liberal Party politician Christian Stray. Stray soon became the sole owner. His daughter Anne Lise was given 70% of the shares in 1963, and took over at Christian's death in 1981. This family ownership is an anomaly in Norway.

The newspaper was affiliated with the Liberal Party until the party split in 1972. It then followed the Liberal People's Party for a short period before becoming non-partisan. Its current stance is in general terms liberal-democratic.

In addition to Arendal Municipality, where they have their office, it has a significant distribution in Risør Municipality, Tvedestrand Municipality and Grimstad Municipality. It is published six days a week since 1897, launched its Internet edition in 1998 and introduced the tabloid format in 2004. In 2005 the paper had a circulation of 23,329, of whom 21,983 are subscribers.

It is published by the stock company Agderposten AS, which is owned 100% by Agderposten Medier AS. Agderposten AS also holds a 92.8% ownership of TV Aust-Agder, 96.4 of Radio Agder, 97.7% of Grimstad Adressetidende, 100% of Lillesandsposten and Vennesla Tidende. It was one of the founders of Kanal 24, but sold its shares in 2006.

The 2013 circulation of Agderposten was 19,853 copies.
