= Arkivet (Kristiansand) =

Building in Kristiansand, Norway

Coordinates: 58°08′41″N 7°58′53″E

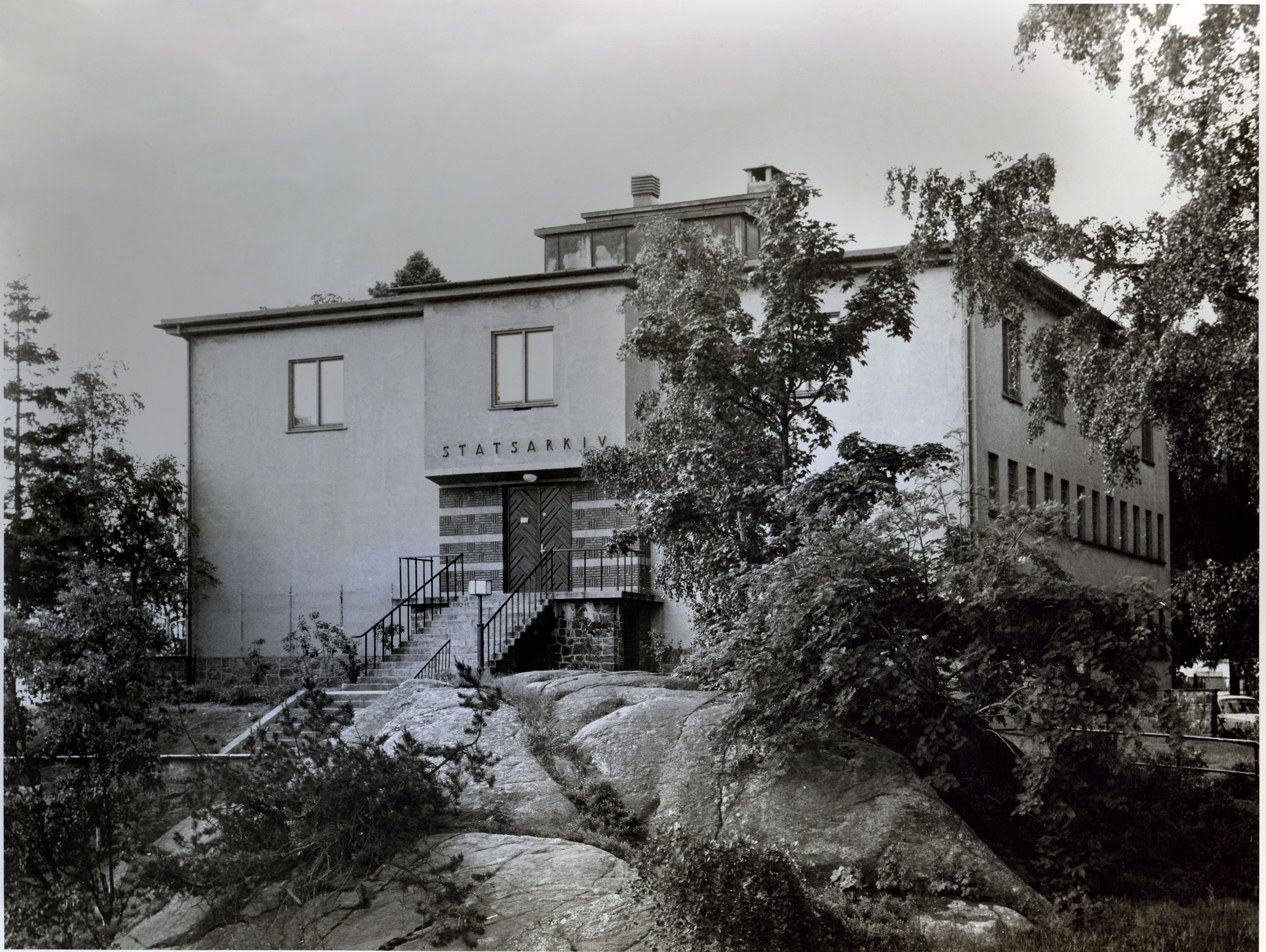
The archival building (c. 1969)

Arkivet (meaning the Archive) is the established name of a building in Vesterveien 4 in Kristiansand, Norway. The building was constructed in 1935 for the Archival Services in Kristiansand, and in the periods 1935–1940 and 1945–1997 used by this institution. Nevertheless, the building is more known for its time as the headquarters of the Gestapo in southern Norway from 1942–1945. The building is owned and operated by the foundation Stiftelsen Arkivet. Arikivet is located in the residential area of Bellevue overlooking the western harbor of Kristiansand. The building in the functionalist style was completed in 1935.

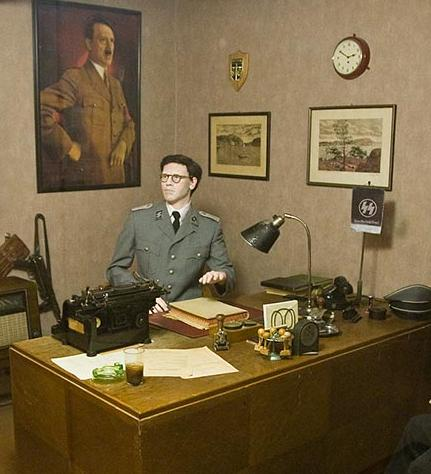
From an earlier edition of the museum exhibition. This room is made to resemble the office of SS-Hauptsturmführer Rudolf Kerner (the head of Gestapo at Arkivet).

== ARKIVET as a "Peace and Human Rights Center" ==
In 2018, ARKIVET got its new name and designation as a "Peace and Human Rights Center", a designation shared by the likes of the Rafto Foundation and the Center for Studies of the Holocaust and Religious Minorities, among others. This network is tasked by, and largely financed by the government, to advance and strengthen democratic values, critical thinking, human rights and minority protection through education and research with a particular catering to school students.

As of 2026, the complex consists of the 1935 building and a second building from 2018. It employs over 25 people from various backgrounds, including teaching, higher education and research, collection managing and administrators.

=== Education ===
Through cooperation with local municipalities, ARKIVET is visited by thousands of school students every year. Most secondary schools in Agder consider a visit to ARKIVET as an integral part of their yearly teaching plans, usually in the 9th grade. Educators from ARKIVET also offer lessons "in the field", for example through participation in the "Cultural Backpack" (a state program through which school students is exposed to a wide range of cultural performances and educational input from external and independent actors through their time as students).

In 2025, more than 10 000 students either visited ARKIVET on school trips or participated in lessons provided by its employees.

=== Norwegian Centre for War Sailor History and fanger.no ===
ARKIVET also houses the Norwegian Centre for War Sailor History which runs the "War Sailor Register".

The website fanger.no, a public register containing information on tens of thousands of people imprisoned during the occupation of Norway, is also run by ARKIVET in cooperation with other actors.

=== National Center for Combating Violent Extremism ===
In 2025 it was announced by the Minister of Justice Astri Aas-Hansen that a new national center established to combat radicalization and violent extremism will be established as an entity under the administration of the already existing ARKIVET.

As of 2026, recruiting of staff and planned physical expansion of the complex is ongoing. The first leader of the National Center began her tenure in May 2026.

== Gestapo headquarters ==
See also the incomplete List of Arkivet prisoners

After Norway was occupied by Nazi Germany in April 1940, the building was taken over by German anti-aircraft troops. In 1941 it was given back to the Norwegian National Archives. A year later, in 1942, the building was requisitioned by the Gestapo, however. Until May 1945 Vesterveien 4 was the Gestapo headquarters in the southern Norway.

The SS-Hauptsturmführer and Kriminalkommisar Rudolf Kerner was in charge of the building at Vesterveien 4, from then on known as Arkivet, one of the most notorious Gestapo stations in Norway, feared by the Norwegian resistance fighters. According to figures from Stiftelsen Arkivet were

- about 3,500 Norwegians arrested by the Gestapo and detained for several days in Arkivet.
- 367 Norwegian men and women roughly tortured here. Several died during or as a result of torture.

From the "House of horror" as Arkivet was nicknamed, Kerner himself and five other Gestapo officers in addition to Norwegian collaborationists including Ole Wehus were prosecuted and harshly judged during the Legal purge in Norway after World War II.

In 1945 the building was again adopted by the Norwegian National Archives. All archival material during the war were brought to safety in Oslo – which was also kept in the silver mines at Kongsberg – and no material was lost while the German occupiers were in possession of the building. The building was once again used by the National Archives until 1997.

== Stiftelsen Arkivet ==
After the National Archives in Kristiansand was moved to a new building in another location, the old building was taken over by the foundation Stiftelsen Arkivet, which conducts education and documentation, research on and outreach on Norwegian occupation history.

The basement, where there is a museum furnished, is brought back to the condition it was in the period 1942–1945, with reconstructions of cells, torture chambers and equipment. Among others is the torture scene where Henriette Bie Lorentzen was tortured reconstructed. Arkivet is the only existing, authentic Gestapo headquarters in Norway.

The building became an information center about Norway during World War II and education for peace building and conflict resolution.

The first floor and upwards of the building is leased to humanitarian organizations as the Red Cross and Amnesty International.

The names of 162 Norwegian victims who were killed in concentration camps or executed, are mounted on a monument in front of the building.

The building is open to the public.

=== Wartime sailing research ===
The foundation received through the Norwegian government budget for 2016, funds to establish a Norwegian documentation center for wartime sailing history and the operation of a new War Sailor Register. This is a search website for ships, crews and individuals who sailed for Norwegian ships and Norwegians on foreign ships during World War II. This is a topic that Stftelsen Arkivet has researched around for some time already.
