= Zeitschrift für Kristallographie – Crystalline Materials =

- Discipline: Chemistry, crystallography
- Language: English
- Edited by: Rainer Pöttgen

Publication details
- History: 1877–present (suspended 1946–1954)
- Publisher: Walter de Gruyter
- Frequency: Monthly
- Impact factor: 1.616 (2020)

Standard abbreviations
- ISO 4: Z. Kristallogr. Cryst. Mater.

Indexing
- ISSN: 2194-4946 (print); 2196-7105 (web)
- LCCN: 2014207382
- OCLC no.: 604940750

Links
- Journal homepage

Zeitschrift für Kristallographie – Crystalline Materials is a monthly peer-reviewed scientific journal published in English. The journal publishes theoretical and experimental studies in crystallography of both organic and inorganic substances. The editor-in-chief of the journal is Rainer Pöttgen from the University of Münster. The journal was founded in 1877 under the title Zeitschrift für Krystallographie und Mineralogie by crystallographer and mineralogist Paul Heinrich von Groth, who served as the editor for 44 years. It has used several titles over its history, with the present title having been adopted in 2010. The journal is indexed in a variety of databases and has a 2020 impact factor of 1.616.

== History ==
The journal was established in 1877 by Paul von Groth as a German-language publication under the title Zeitschrift für Krystallographie und Mineralogie, and he served as its editor until the end of 1920. Groth was appointed as the inaugural Professor of Mineralogy at the University of Strasbourg in 1872 and made great contributions to the disciplines of mineralogy and crystallography both there and, from 1883, as the curator at the Deutsches Museum in Munich. Groth was the first to classify minerals according to their chemical composition and contributed to the understanding of isomorphism and morphotropy in crystalline systems. Using the data from 55 volumes of the journal covering 39 years of publications (1877–1915) plus other sources, Groth produced the five volume work Chemische Krystallographie between 1906 and 1919. This work catalogued the chemical and physical properties of the between 9,000 and 10,000 crystalline substances known at the time.

It has used a series of names over its history (see table below), finally becoming Zeitschrift für Kristallographie – Crystalline Materials in 2010, a name distinguishing it from the 1987 spin-off journal Zeitschrift für Kristallographie – New Crystal Structures.

| Journal Title | Years | Abbreviation | Language | Identification | Publisher | Ref |
|---|---|---|---|---|---|---|
| Zeitschrift für Krystallographie und Mineralogie | 1877–1920 | Z. Krystallog. | German | CODEN ZKGMA5; ISSN 0373-4218; OCLC 5087138 | Wilhelm Engelmann (Leipzig) | |
| Zeitschrift für Kristallographie (Kristallgeometrie, Kristallphysik, Kristallchemie) | 1921–1929 | Z. Kristallogr. Krist. | English; French; German | CODEN ZKKKAJ; ISSN 0044-2968; LCCN sn94-96016 OCLC 3698185 | Akademische Verlagsgesellschaft (Wiesbaden) | |
| Zeitschrift für Kristallographie, Mineralogie und Petrographie. Abteilung A: Zeitschrift für Kristallographie, Kristallgeometrie, Kristallphysik, Kristallchemie | 1930–1945 | Z. Kristallogr. Krist. | English; French; German | CODEN ZKKKAJ; ISSN 0044-2968; LCCN sn94-96016 OCLC 3698185 | Akademische Verlagsgesellschaft (Wiesbaden) | |
| Publication suspended | 1946–1954 | | English; French; German | CODEN ZKKKAJ; ISSN 0044-2968; LCCN sn94-96016 OCLC 3698185 | Akademische Verlagsgesellschaft (Wiesbaden) | |
| Zeitschrift für Kristallographie, Kristallgeometrie, Kristallphysik, Kristallchemie | 1955–1977 | Z. Kristallogr. Krist. | English; French; German | CODEN ZKKKAJ; ISSN 0044-2968; LCCN sn94-96016 OCLC 3698185 | Akademische Verlagsgesellschaft (Wiesbaden) | |
| Zeitschrift für Kristallographie | 1978–2009 | Z. Kristallog. | English; German | ISSN 0044-2968; LCCN sn97-23098 OCLC 4734421 | Akademische Verlagsgesellschaft (Wiesbaden) | |
| Zeitschrift für Kristallographie – Crystalline Materials | 2010– | Z. Kristallogr. Cryst. Mater. | English | ISSN 2194-4946; LCCN 97-23098; OCLC 604940750 | Walter de Gruyter (Berlin) | |

=== Special issues ===
Beginning in December 2002, the journal has produced special issues with articles grouped around a single theme. Topics covered include the analysis of complex materials using pair distribution function methods, borates (double issue), hydrogen storage, in situ crystallisation, mathematical crystallography, mineral structures, nanocrystallography, phononic crystals, photocrystallography, the application of precession electron diffraction methods, twinned crystals, and zeolites (double issue). On four occasions, one or two issues of the journal have been dedicated to the memory of a crystallographer or mineralogist, usually with a theme associated with the individual's work and a description of their contribution to the field. These are summarised in the table below:

| Honouree | Date of death | Issue | Theme |
|---|---|---|---|
| Siegfried Haussühl | 7 January 2014 | Nov 2015 – 230(11) | Crystal physics |
| Heinz Jagodzinski | 22 November 2012 | Jan 2015 – 230(1) | Aperiodic order and disorder |
| Friedrich Liebau | 11 March 2011 | Jul 2012 – 227(7); Aug 2012 – 227(8) | Double issue dedicated to the memory of Friedrich Liebau |
| Fritz Laves | 12 August 1978 | May 2006 – 221(5–7) | Crystal chemistry of intermetallic compounds Special Issue on the 100th anniversary of Laves' birth |

== Abstracting and indexing ==
The journal is abstracted and indexed in:

- Chemical Abstracts Service
- Current Contents/Physical, Chemical and Earth Sciences
- EBSCO databases
- Inspec
- Science Citation Index Expanded
- Scopus

According to the Journal Citation Reports, the journal has a 2015 impact factor of 2.560, and it is ranked 8th amongst the 26 crystallography journals.
