= Heinrich Karsten Wagenfeld =

German physicist

- Born: December 20, 1928; Weimar, Germany
- Died: April 1, 2005 (aged 76); Melbourne, Australia
- Citizenship: German
- Education: Lilienthal-Gymnasium Berlin (Abitur)
- Alma mater: Free University of Berlin
- Known for: Work in electron and X-ray crystallography; Borrmann effect
- Spouse: Elma Hohlweg
- Scientific career
- Fields: Physics
- Thesis: Interferenzbrechung von Elektronenwellen in durchstrahlten Mikrokristallen bei simultaner Anregung mehrerer Interferenzen (1958)
- Doctoral advisor: Kurt Molière

Hein Wagenfeld (December 20, 1928 – April 1, 2005) was a German theoretical and experimental physicist known for his work in electron and X-ray crystallography especially X-ray diffraction relating to absorption and the Borrmann effect. He was highly regarded for his commitment to international understanding and peace.

== Biography ==
=== Early years ===
Wagenfeld was born to Bauhaus designer Wilhelm Wagenfeld and Elsa née Heinrich. He attended the Volksschule (primary school) in Oberweimar (1935 to 1938) and in Berlin Schlachtensee (1938 and 1939). From 1939 to 1943 he attended the Dreilinden Oberschule (high school) in Berlin Wannsee until his mother sent him out of Berlin due to the escalating bombing raids. He briefly attended high school in Weimar but his openly anti-Nazi attitude made the situation unsafe and he returned to live with his mother in Berlin. In Berlin in 1944 he received secret tuition in English and Mathematics from a retired Jewish teacher named Dr. Skutsch.

In September 1944, Himmler, Reichsfuehrer of the SS, issued the decree that all men between 16 and 60 enter the Volksturm. When Wagenfeld turned 16 that December, he avoided the Volkssturm by enlisting in an Air Force Auxiliary unit and managed to survive the months till the end of the war without significant combat experience. From the age of 16–18 Wagenfeld was held British prisoner of war in the Munster Training Area (Munsterlager) in the Lüneburg Heath. He ‘doctored’ his discharge papers and discharged himself from prison camp in March 1947. From 1947–1948 he continued his schooling at the Lilienthal High School in Berlin Lichterfelde where he completed his Abitur (Matriculation).

In October 1948 Wagenfeld commenced studying Ancient Languages and Philosophy at the Philosophical Faculty of the Free University Berlin but switched to the Science Faculty in 1949 with Physics as his major subject. He completed his Vordiplom (Bachelor of Science equivalent) in Physics in 1952. From October 1952 to 1958 he held a position of Assistant at the Fritz Haber Institute of the MPG in Berlin, in the department of Professor Dr. Kurt Molière, while continuing to study Physics part-time at the Free University.

Wagenfeld’s Diplom thesis (Masters of Science equivalent) was for a project carried out at the Fritz-Haber-Institute under supervision of Professor Molière (“Untersuchung über die Feinstrukturen der Elektronenbeugungsreflexe durchstrahlter Mikrokristalle“ / Investigation of the fine structures in electron diffraction patterns of irradiated microcrystals). The Institute recommended Wagenfeld turn this thesis into his PhD. Wagenfeld did so, and in 1958 was awarded the degree Dr. rer. nat. (Experimental Physics) for the inaugural dissertation “Interferenzbrechung von Elektronenwellen in durchstrahlten Mikrokristallen bei simultaner Anregung mehrerer Interferenzen” (Interference diffraction of electron waves in irradiated microcrystals with simultaneous excitation of multiple interferences).

=== Career ===
In 1956 Wagenfeld married doctoral student and chemistry graduate Elma Hohlweg, with whom he had three children. Wagenfeld continued working at the Fritz Haber Institute on techniques based on the Nobel Prize winning discovery of his mentor, Prof. Max von Laue. At a conference in celebration of von Laue’s 80th birthday in 1959, Wagenfeld met a great pioneer in the field of crystal diffraction, Prof. Paul Peter Ewald, Head of the Physics Department at Brooklyn Polytechnic in New York City.

In 1962–1963 Wagenfeld moved to the UK and worked as a research assistant at Bristol University. Following a meeting at a conference in Rome, he was invited by Prof. John Cowley to take the position of Senior Lecturer in the School of Physics at the University of Melbourne from the beginning of 1964. Here Wagenfeld worked with David Cockayne (later Professor at Oxford University) and supervised several Masters and Ph. D. students. In 1966 Wagenfeld organized a Summer School for the International Union of Crystallography in Warburton near Melbourne, where he consolidated his relationship with Paul Ewald who was attending as an international guest.

In 1967 Wagenfeld was promoted to Reader in Physics at University of Melbourne but instead accepted an appointment as Associate Professor at New York’s Brooklyn Polytechnic, on the Ewald’s recommendation, now Professor Emeritus. Moving to the United States, Wagenfeld worked in Prof. Dick Stern’s research group on Low-energy electron diffraction and X-Ray Diffraction. He became good friends with the new Head of Department, Prof. Helmut Juretschke. One of the attractions of living in New York was the opportunity to develop the friendship and working relationship with Ewald. The Ewalds lived in New Milford, Connecticut, and the Wagenfeld family would visit regularly. In 1969, Wagenfeld met and established a relationship with Ewald’s son-in-law, the theoretical physicist Hans Bethe, who had won the Physics Nobel Prize for his work on stellar nucleosynthesis in 1968. During this time Wagenfeld also worked as a consultant at IBM’s component division in East Fishkill, NY; amongst other projects he consulted on electron and Xray diffraction.

In 1972 Wagenfeld returned to Berlin’s Fritz Haber Institute as Wissenschaftlicher Mitarbeiter (Research Scientist) of the Max Planck Society and worked in Dr. Gerhard Borrmann’s group on X-Ray absorption (cf. the Borrmann Effect) until 1975. In that year he was awarded his Habilitation in Theoretical Physics by Technische Universität Berlin.

Attracted by the prospect of helping transform the Royal Melbourne Institute of Technology (RMIT) into a research university, Wagenfeld returned to Australia in 1975, accepting a Professorial appointment in the Applied Physics Department. He was appointed Head of the Applied Physics Department in 1978.

Wagenfeld was influential in the establishment of RMIT’s Research Committee in 1977 under the chairmanship of (then Dr. later Prof.) Brian Smith and was the first editor of RMIT’s research report. He was a strong promoter of post-graduate research degrees before they were officially sanctioned by the Victoria Post Secondary Education Commission. Under his leadership the Applied Physics Department enrolled some of RMIT’s first Masters students and its second PhD candidate and established collaborative research programs with other University departments. His collaboration with David Beanland and the Department of Communications and Electronic Engineering was decisive in establishing the Microelectronics and Materials Technology Centre.

Wagenfeld promoted collaboration between RMIT and industrial and government research laboratories (including the Commonwealth Scientific and Industrial Research Organisation (CSIRO) and the Australian Defence Services Laboratory) in the form of jointly supervised post-graduate programs. The Professional Experience program allowed undergraduate students to participate in research in those laboratories. Wagenfeld also persuaded the Australian Institute of Physics to fund the first Australian Conference on Applied Physics in Rockhampton Australia in 1979 and held the second Applied Physics Conference at RMIT in 1981.

Wagenfeld’s contributions to industrial research extended far beyond RMIT. In discussions with the Australian Federal Ministers Barry Jones and John Button, Wagenfeld advocated for greater scientific and industrial research collaboration. He also initiated contact with the Chinese Academy of Sciences and hosted the Australia China Workshop on Advanced Materials at RMIT in 1984.

Wagenfeld had deep concern for issues of environmental degradation, the depletion of natural resources, social responsibility and the arms race. Wagenfeld influenced RMIT’s decision not to accept research funding from the United States Strategic Defence Initiative (“Star Wars”) Missile Defence program in the 1980s. He played a major role in establishing RMIT’s Context Curriculum, a general education program designed to stimulate students’ awareness between their professional specialty and larger world issues.

As President of the Australian branch of Scientists against Nuclear Armament, Wagenfeld attended domestic and international conferences and had contact with eminent peace advocates in Australia and overseas. Concerned by the escalating arms race in the 1980s, and with the strong belief that young people can change the world, Wagenfeld established the Youth Building the Future Conference, a series of conferences uniting young people from a wide range of cultures. The inaugural Youth Building the Future Conference, held in 1987 at Lorne, Victoria, was attended by students from 15 countries of Europe, America, Africa, Asia and the Pacific. Subsequent conferences were held in Canada, Argentina, Egypt, Norway, Jordan and again in Australia in 1997.

When he retired in 1993, he was appointed RMIT’s first Professor Emeritus. He continued his research work at the university for the next years. He died after a long illness in 2005.

== Awards ==
In 1990 Wagenfeld was appointed the first Institute Fellow of RMIT in recognition of his role in expanding research at RMIT, especially in Applied Physics.
