= Hartmut Bärnighausen =

German chemist (1933–2025)

Hartmut Bärnighausen (16 February 1933 – 30 March 2025) was a German chemist and crystallographer. He was known for establishing the Bärnighausen trees which describe group-subgroup relationships of crystal structures.

== Life ==
Bärnighausen studied Chemistry at Leipzig University and received his diploma after a diploma thesis with Leopold Wolf in 1955. In May 1958, he flew from East Germany to University of Freiburg, where he worked with Georg Brauer. He finished his doctorate in the group of Georg Brauer in 1959. In 1967, he received his habilitation. From 1967 to 1998, he was a professor for inorganic chemistry at the University of Karlsruhe.

Bärnighausen died on 30 March 2025, at the age of 92.

== Research ==
His research focused on the following topics:

- crystallographic group theory in crystal chemistry (Bärnighausen trees)
- synthesis and characterization of new compounds in including rare earth metals
- structure refinements of twinned crystals

== Awards ==
He was awarded the Carl Hermann Medal of the German Crystallographic Society in 1997.
