= Werner Fischer (crystallographer) =

German mineralogist (1931–2026)

- Born: 8 February 1931; Gablonz an der Neisse, Czechoslovakia
- Died: 4 October 2026 (aged 95)
- Education: University of Stuttgart; University of Kiel
- Known for: Coordination sequence lattice complex
- Scientific career
- Fields: Mathematical crystallography
- Workplaces: University of Münster; Philipps-University Marburg
- Thesis: Strukturuntersuchungen an synthetischem Carnallit (1959)

Werner Fischer (8 February 1931 – 4 October 2026) was a German mineralogist and mathematical crystallographer.

== Life and career ==
Fischer was born in Gablonz an der Neisse, Czechoslovakia on 8 February 1931. He passed his Abitur in 1951 in Kappeln an der Schlei. Supported by the German National Academic Foundation, he studied at University of Stuttgart and University of Kiel. There he also received his doctorate in 1959 with a thesis on structural studies on synthetic carnallite. In 1970 he habilitated at Philipps-University Marburg with a thesis on homogeneous packing of spheres and their conditions of existence in space groups of tetragonal symmetry. In 1971 he was appointed professor. From 1974 to 1978 he worked at the University of Münster and then worked at the Philipps-University Marburg until his retirement in 1996.

His research dealt with mathematical crystallography, in particular with periodic minimal surfaces, sphere packings, effective areas, normalizers, lattice complexes, the description of crystal structures and worked on the International Tables for Crystallography. This work was very often done in collaboration with Elke Koch.

Fischer died on 4 October 2026, at the age of 95.

== Honours and awards ==
Fischer received the 2006 Carl Hermann Medal from the German Crystallographic Society.
