= German Mineralogical Society =

The German Mineralogical Society (Deutsche Mineralogische Gesellschaft, or DMG, in German) is a non-profit German society for the promotion of mineralogy. It has about 1400 members (2021) and belongs to the International Mineralogical Association and the umbrella organization for geosciences. It was founded at the meeting of German natural scientists and physicians in Cologne in 1908 based on a proposal by Friedrich Martin Berwerth at the 1907 meeting in Dresden.

The current chairman (2021-2022) is the geochemist Friedhelm von Blanckenburg.

== Organization structure ==
The DMG has the sections:

- Applied mineralogy: systematics, properties of minerals; Organic, clay mineralogy, gemology
- Crystallography: Research into the atomic structure and properties of inorganic and organic crystals (structural research, crystal chemistry, crystal physics, crystal growth and growth)
- Geochemistry: distribution laws, frequency and mobility of chemical elements in the Earth, the seas, the atmosphere and in space (analytical, experimental, theoretical, applied, environmental geochemistry)
- Petrology and petrophysics: Formation, origin and transformation of rocks; Investigations and syntheses under simulated conditions of the Earth's interior (experimental petrology), structural investigations

Besides, the DMG has the working groups Archaeometry and Monument Preservation, Raw Materials Research, Mineralogical Museums and Collections and Mineralogy in Schools and Universities.

== Awards and prizes ==
The DMG awards prizes

- Abraham Gottlob Werner Medal in silver and gold
- Victor Moritz Goldschmidt Prize for young scientists
- Georg Agricola Medal in applied mineralogy
- Paul Ramdohr Prize for young scientists
- Beate Mocek Prize for young female scientists

The DMG publishes multiple journals with other societies, including European Journal of Mineralogy along with the Italian and French mineralogical societies, and the magazine Elements, along with 18 other geochemical, cosmochemical and mineralogical societies.

== Honorary members ==
- 1924 Max von Laue (1879–1960), Friedrich Becke (1855–1931), Waldemar Christofer Brøgger (1851–1940)
- 1925 Gustav Tschermak (1836–1927)
- 1927 Henry Alexander Miers (1858–1942), Leonard James Spencer (1870–1959), Jakob Johannes Sederholm (1863–1934)
- 1931 Gottlob Linck (1858–1947), Reinhard Brauns (1861–1937)
- 1932 Edward H. Kraus (1875–1973), Charles Palache (1869–1954)
- 1932 Friedrich Rinne (1863–1933)
- 1935 Gustav Klemm (1858–1938)
- 1938 Josef Emanuel Hibsch (1852–1940)
- 1947 Ludwig Ferdinand von Wolff (1874–1952), Otto Erdmannsdörffer (1876–1955)
- 1948 Hermann Steinmetz (1879–1964)
- 1949 Paul Niggli (1888–1953)
- 1950 Pentti Eskola (1883–1964), Percy Dudgeon Quensel (1881–1966), Karl-Hermann Scheumann (1881–1964)
- 1953 Hermann Tertsch (1880–1962), Walther Kossel (1888–1956), Iwan Stranski (1897–1979)
- 1957 Martin J. Buerger (1903–1986)
- 1958 Paul Peter Ewald (1888–1985)
- 1962 Carl Wilhelm Correns (1893–1980)
- 1963 Felix Machatschki (1895–1970)
- 1968 John Frank Schairer (1904–1970)
- 1970 Thomas F. W. Barth (1899–1971)
- 1971 Emil Lehmann (1881–1981), Adolf Pabst (1899–1990)
- 1972 Hermann Rose (Mineraloge) (1883–1976)
- 1973 George T. Faust (1908–1985)
- 1975 Theodor Ernst (1904–1983)
- 1976 Fritz Laves (1906–1978)
- 1980 Heinz Meixner (1908–1981)
- 1980 Werner Nowacki (1909–1988)
- 1981 Walter Noll (1907–1987), Doris Schachner (1904–1988)
- 1982 Karl Hugo Strunz (1910–2006), Georges Deicha (1917–2011)
- 1988 Hans Ulrich Bambauer (1929–2021)
- 1991 Josef Zemann (* 1923)
- 1992 Heinz Jagodzinski (1916–2012)
- 1995 Horst Saalfeld (1920–2022)
- 2000 Werner Schreyer (1930–2006)
- 2002 Volkmar Trommsdorff (1936–2005)
- 2004 Egon Althaus (1933–2022)
- 2005 Karl Hans Wedepohl (1925–2016), Friedrich Liebau (1926–2011)
- 2006 Peter Paufler (* 1940)
- 2015 Hans A. Seck (1935–2016), Friedrich Seifert (* 1941), Martin Okrusch (* 1934), Jochen Hoefs (* 1939)
- 2016 Herbert Kroll (* 1940), Herbert Palme (* 1943)
- 2017 Walter Maresch (* 1944)
- 2019 Christian Chopin (* 1955)
- 2020 Klaus Keil (1934–2022)
