= Tammann Commemorative Medal =

Materials science research award

The Tammann Commemorative Medal is awarded once a year and was established in remembrance of Gustav H. J. A. Tammann. It honors members of the Deutsche Gesellschaft für Materialkunde, who have made outstanding contributions to the field of materials research.

== Awardees ==
- 1973 Heinrich Wollenberger
- 1974 Hans Hillmann
- 1975 Manfred Wilkens
- 1976 Otmar Vöhringer
- 1977 Werner Pepperhoff
- 1978 Heinrich Mecking
- 1979 Theodor Hehenkamp
- 1980 Ulrich Heubner
- 1981 Helmut Holleck
- 1982 Friedrich Pfeifer
- 1983 Sigfried Steeb
- 1984 Christian Herzig
- 1986 Rudolf Akeret
- 1988 Florian Schubert
- 1989 Hans Paul Hougardy
- 1990 Herbert Stephan
- 1991 Georg Grathwohl
- 1992 Ernst-Theo Henig
- 1993 Wolfgang Gust
- 1994 Gerhard Inden
- 1995 Gerhard Sauthoff
- 1996 Hans Jürgen Grabke
- 1997 Günter Lange
- 1998 Hans-Georg Sockel
- 1999 Fritz Appel
- 2000 Gerhard K. Wolf
- 2001 Hans-Eckhardt Schaefer
- 2002 Dmitri Molodov
- 2004 Hermann Riedel
- 2005 Gunther Eggeler
- 2006 Stefanie Tschegg
- 2007 Jürgen Hirsch
- 2008 Rainer Schmid-Fetzer
- 2009 Reinhard Pippan
- 2011 Werner Skrotzki
- 2012 Ralf Riedel
- 2013 Ulrich Martin
- 2014 Peter Uggowitzer
- 2015 Willem J. Quadakkers
- 2016 Birgit Skrotzki
- 2017 Michael Zehetbauer
- 2018 Robert Danzer
- 2019 Jiří Svoboda
- 2020 Christos G. Aneziris
- 2021 Guillermo Requena
