= Heinz Jagodzinski =

German mineralogist and physicist

Heinz Ernst Jagodzinski
- Born: April 20, 1916; Aschersleben, Germany
- Died: November 22, 2012 (aged 96); Munich, Germany
- Education: University of Greifswald; University of Göttingen
- Scientific career
- Institutions: Marburg University; Max Planck Institute; University of Würzburg; University of Karlsruhe (TH); LMU Munich
- Thesis: Über die Druckabhängigkeit der Anregungstemperatur in der Lichtbogensäule
- Doctoral advisor: Reinhold Mannkopff
- Other academic advisors: Fritz Laves

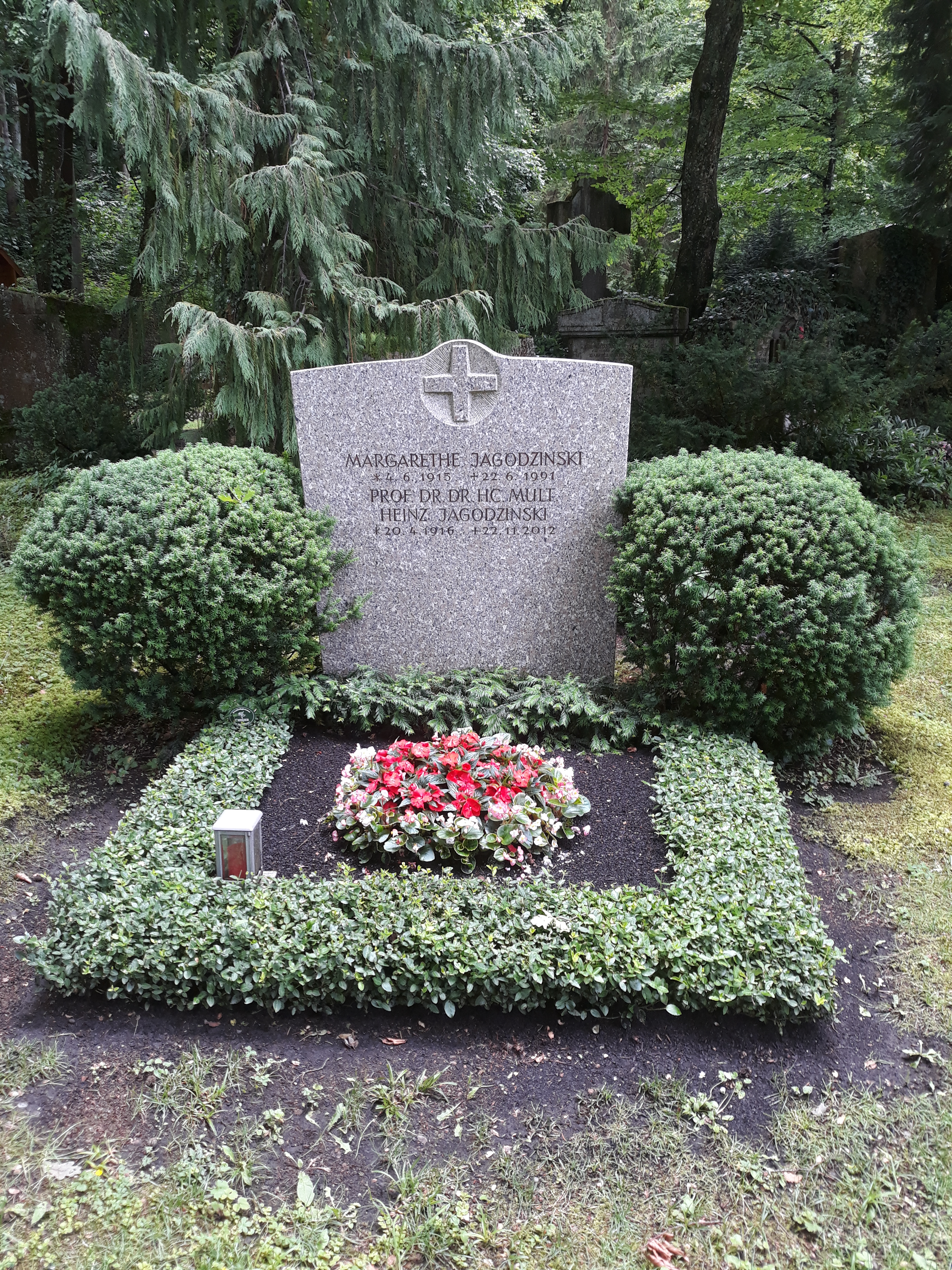
The grave of Heinz Jagodzinski and his wife Margarethe, née Brandenburg, in the Gauting forest cemetery

Heinz Ernst Jagodzinski (20 April 1916 in Aschersleben – 22 November 2012 in Munich) was a German physicist, mineralogist and crystallographer known for his research in disordered materials and diffuse X-ray scattering. He also introduced the Jagodzinski notation for the description of polytypism in silicon carbide.

== Education and career ==
Jagodzinski studied natural sciences at the University of Greifswald and later at the University of Göttingen, where he received his doctorate in physics in 1941 under Reinhold Mannkopff (Über die Druckabhängigkeit der Anregungstemperatur in der Lichtbogensäule). Between 1944 and 1945, he was research assistant at Martin Luther University Halle-Wittenberg. Between 1946 and 1952, he was research assistant and received his habilitation at Marburg University, working under Fritz Laves.

From 1952 to 1963, he headed the crystal science department at the Max Planck Institute for Silicate Research in Würzburg, where he also became an adjunct professor at the University of Würzburg from 1955. In 1959, he became a professor of mineralogy at the University of Karlsruhe (TH). From 1963, Jagodzinski became a full professor of mineralogy and crystallography at LMU Munich, where he retired in 1986. From 1964 he was head of the Bavarian State Collection for Mineralogy.

== Honors and awards ==
In 2001, he received the Cothenius Medal from the German National Academy of Sciences, Leopoldina. He was a corresponding member of the Austrian Academy of Sciences, a member of the Bavarian Academy of Sciences (1969) and the Leopoldina. Among other things, he received an honorary doctorate from the University of Würzburg. In 1984, he received the Federal Cross of Merit, 1st class. Since 1965 he was a member of the Max Planck Society. In 1996, he became an honorary member of the German Crystallographic Society and received the Carl Hermann Medal in 2000.

== Bibliography ==
- Dietzel, Adolf; Jagodzinski, Heinz; Scholze, Horst (1959). Untersuchungen an technischem Siliziumcarbid (in German). doi:10.1007/978-3-663-05000-1. ISBN 978-3-663-05000-1. OCLC 913693897.
- Jagodzinski, Heinz (1978), "Diffraction in surfaces and interfaces", in Treusch, J. (ed.), Festkörperprobleme 18, Advances in Solid State Physics (in German), vol. 18, Berlin, Heidelberg: Springer Berlin Heidelberg, pp. 129–153, doi:10.1007/bfb0107780, ISBN 978-3-528-08024-2
- Frey, F.; Boysen, H.; Jagodzinski, H. (2010-01-01), Disorder diffuse scattering of X-rays and neutrons, pp. 492–539, doi:10.1107/97809553602060000774, ISBN 978-1-4020-8205-4
