= Crystallographer =

Scientist who studies crystals

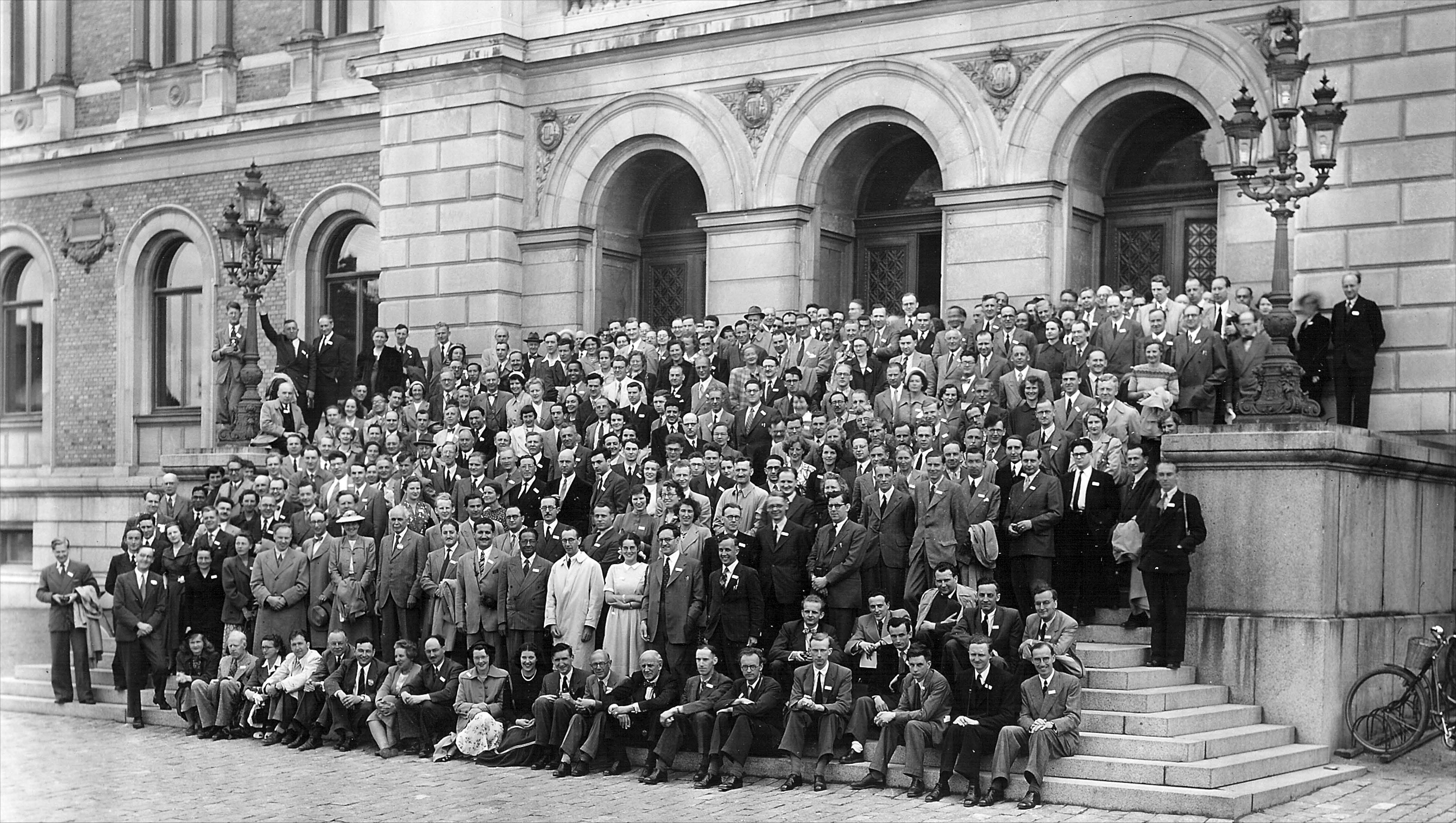
Attendees at the International Union of Crystallographers meeting in 1951

A crystallographer is a type of scientist who practices crystallography, the study of crystals.

== Career paths ==
The work of crystallographers spans several academic disciplines, including the life sciences, chemistry, physics, and materials science. They may work in research and manufacturing, which could include growing crystals for use in computer chips, solar cells, or medications.

Within the life sciences, they may crystallize biological materials (such as proteins or viruses) or drugs. They may also come in hand in forensic science. They may also study materials using materials simulations.

In the horological industry, crystallographers conduct studies of nonmetallic minerals and research for the development and repair of grinding wheels, diamond tools and dies, and fabrication of jeweled bearings.

Most working crystallographers have a graduate degree. There are very few opportunities for those with a bachelor's degree or associate degree.

== By country ==
=== Germany ===
In 2013, one working group, the Young Crystallographers, was established within the German Crystallographic Society (DGK). As of 2024, the Young Crystallographers have about 250 members. The working group also awards the annual Lieselotte Templeton Prize, named after the German-American scientist Lieselotte Templeton.

=== South Africa ===
Out of 78 South African crystallographers profiled in 2001/2, each scientist has 2.6 contacts on average within South Africa and 2.0 contacts on average internationally. The majority of these scientists worked in Gauteng.

=== United States ===
The U.S. Bureau of Labor Statistics groups crystallographers with geoscientists for statistical purposes. However, as of the 2010s, the largest demand for crystallographers actually comes from the medical and life sciences.
