= Aagot Lading =

Danish women's rights activist and headmistress (1909–1963)

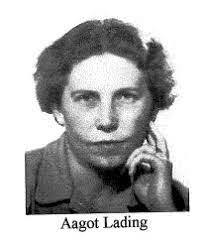

Aagot Henny Lading née Petersen (5 July 1909, Aarhus—15 July 1963, Copenhagen) was a Danish schoolteacher, headmistress and women's rights activist. After graduating in English and history, she was a prominent member of the Danish Women's Society (Dansk Kvindesamfund, DK) where she edited Kvinden & Samfundet. In 1950, she became principal of Rysensteen Gymnasium where she emphasized women's history in the school's history lessons. Despite her efforts to maintain its status as a girls school, new regulations required the school to admnit boys in 1958.

== Early life, family and education ==
Born on 5 July 1909 in Aarhus, Aagot Henny Petersen was the daughter of the factory foreman August Frederik Frants Petersen (1896–1950) and his wife Hilda Kristine née Andersen (1874–1957) from Norway. The eldest of the family's three daughters, her name was changed to Lading in 1917. Raised in a working-class family, she attended the local school in the Copenhagen district of Valby and went on to matriculate from Rysensteen Gymnasium in 1927. Encouraged by the headmistress Maria Nielsen to study history, in 1934 she earned a master's degree in English and history from the University of Copenhagen in 1934.

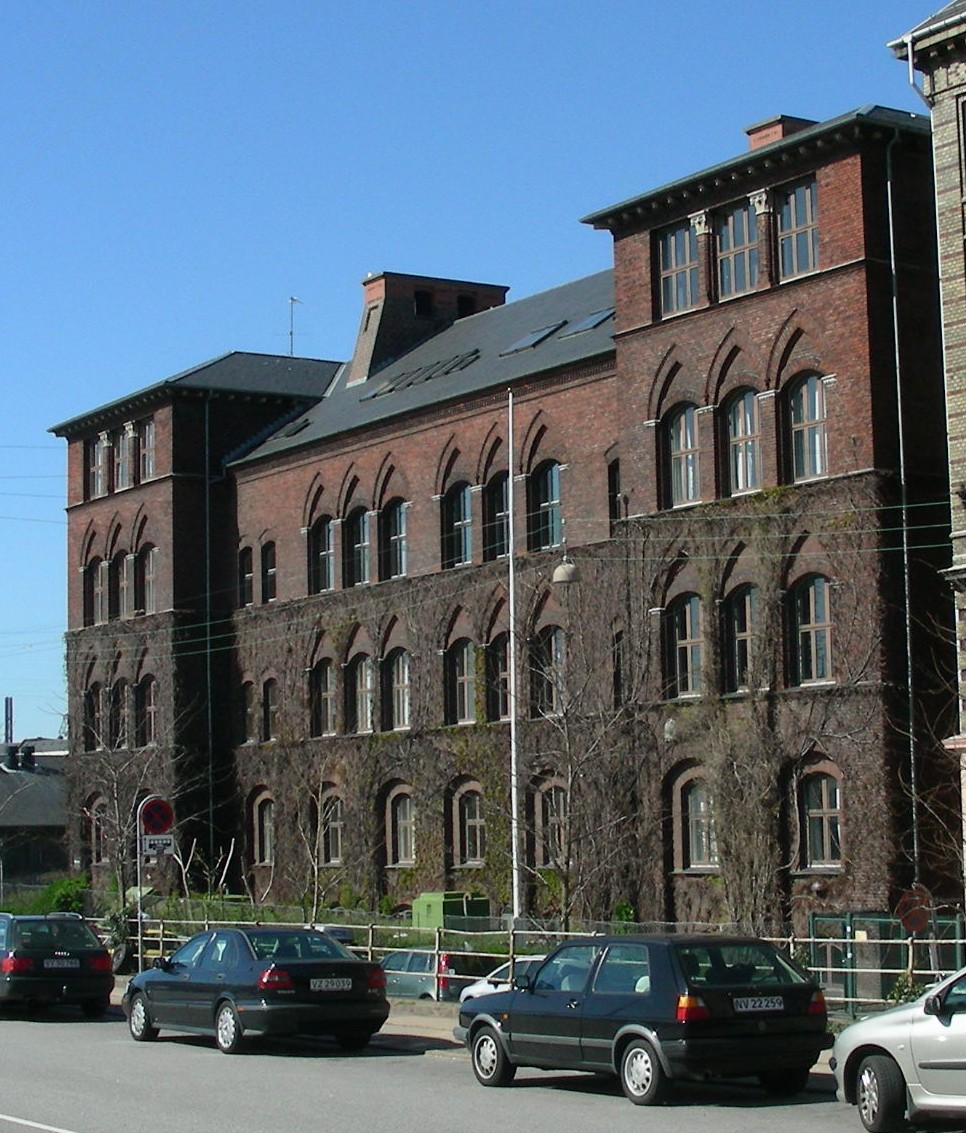
Rysensteen Gymnasium

== Career ==
While at university, Lading became involved in the Women's Society where she sought to improve accommodation facilities for women students. Together with Stella Kornerup in 1933 she founded Dansk Kvindesamfunds Københavnske Ungdomskreds (DKKU), a DK Copenhagen-based youth circle. In 1934, she became editor of DK's Kvinden og Samfundet where she faced and overcame criticism of her youthful frivolity and left-wing approach. She also worked on a comprehensive update of Gyrithe Lemche's history of the Danish Women's Society, publishing Dansk Kvindesamfunds Arbejde gennem 25 Aar jn 1939.

Lading became principal of Rysensteen Gymnasium in 1950. As a historian, she emphasized the importance of including women's history in the curriculum. Although she fought for the institution to remain a girls school, new regulations required boys to be admitted in 1958. After she died in 1963, the new principal was Svend Atke (1910–93).

Aagot Lading died on 15 July 1963 in the Copenhagen district of Frederiksberg and was buried in Bispebjerg Cemetery.
