= Sine Larsen =

Danish chemist and crystallographer (1943–2025)

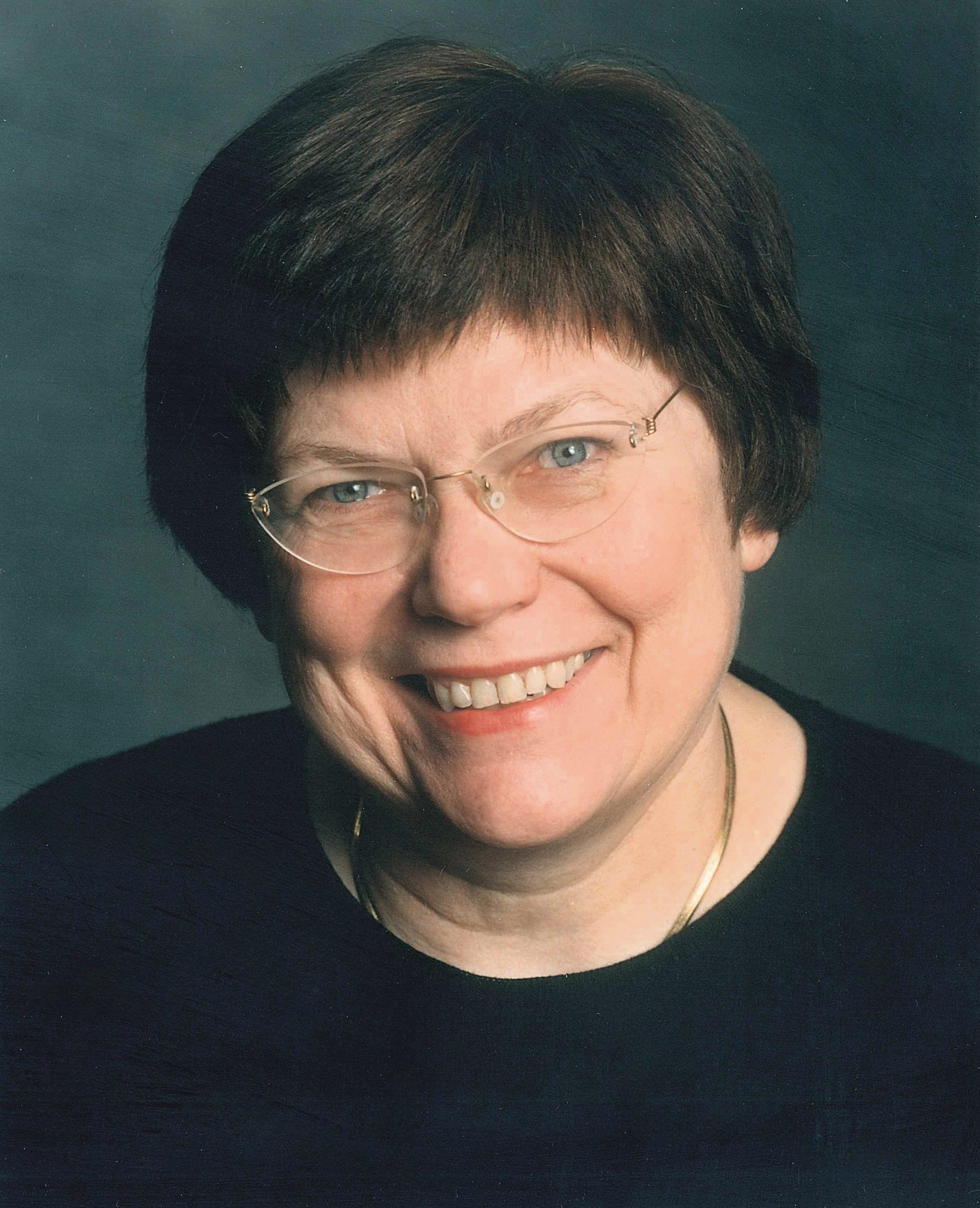
- Larsen in 2002
- Born: Sine Ydun Blus-Pedersen; 28 May 1943; Copenhagen, Denmark
- Died: 4 January 2025 (aged 81)
- Education: Rysensteen Gymnasium; University of Copenhagen
- Awards: Order of the Dannebrog
- Scientific career
- Fields: Structural chemistry, crystallography
- Workplaces: Massachusetts Institute of Technology; Technical University of Denmark; University of Copenhagen; International Union of Crystallography; Danish Natural Sciences Research Council; European Research Council; European Synchrotron Radiation Facility; MAX IV Laboratory

Professor Sine Ydun Larsen (née Blus-Pedersen, 28 May 1943 – 4 January 2025) was a Danish structural chemist, crystallographer and scientific director. Her research included crystal structure analyses of organic molecules and proteins, chirality and charge density studies. She was scientific research director at the European Synchrotron Radiation Facility (ESRF) in Grenoble, France, general director at the MAX IV Laboratory synchrotron radiation facility in Lund, Sweden, and director of the Centre for Crystallographic Studies at the University of Copenhagen in Copenhagen, Denmark. She was president, general secretary and treasurer of the International Union of Crystallography (IUCr). She was awarded the Max Perutz Prize by the European Crystallographic Association (ECA), was appointed to the Order of the Dannebrog and was elected to the Royal Physiographic Society in Lund.

== Biography ==
Larsen was born on 28 May 1943 in Copenhagen, Denmark.

Larsen was educated at Rysensteen Gymnasium, then studied chemistry at the University of Copenhagen, graduating in 1968. After graduating, Larsen worked as postdoctoral researcher with American chemist F. Albert Cotton at the Massachusetts Institute of Technology (MIT) in Cambridge, Massachusetts, United States. She then worked at the Technical University of Denmark in Kongens Lyngby, Denmark.

In 1994, Larsen became the professor of structural chemistry and director of the Centre for Crystallographic Studies at her alma mater, University of Copenhagen. Alongside her university appointments, Larsen gave scientific advice to the Italian synchrotron plant ELETTRA, the Spanish plant ALBA, the European X-ray Free Electron Laser Project, United States National Synchrotron Light Source II and the German research facility DESY.

In 1996, Larsen was elected general secretary and treasurer of the International Union of Crystallography (IUCr). She was elected as president of the IUCr in 2008 and served as president until 2014. She was vice president of the Danish Natural Sciences Research Council and president of the Chemistry Committees of the European Research Council (ERC).

In 1998, Larsen gave the annual Hasselforelesningen (The Hassel Lecture, in honour of Norwegian physical chemist and Nobel Laureate Odd Hassel) on the "Interactions between Chiral Molecules" at the University of Oslo in Oslo, Norway.

From 1998 to 2003, Larsen deposited 36 structures in the Protein Data Bank.

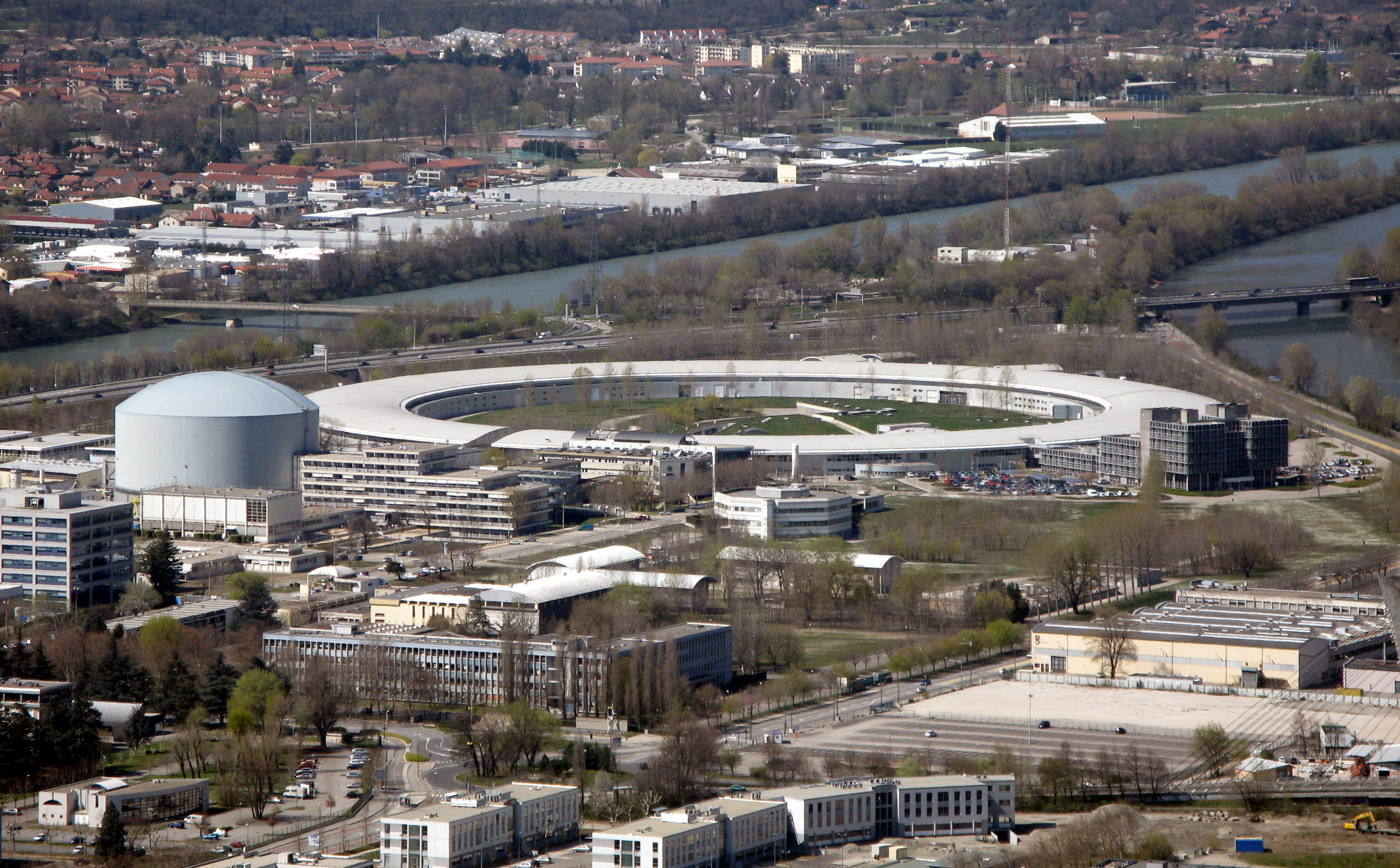
The European Synchrotron Radiation Facility (ESRF) in Grenoble, France, in 2008, while Larsen was research director

In 2003, Larsen became one of two scientific research directors and part of the senior management team at the European Synchrotron Radiation Facility (ESRF) in Grenoble, France, succeeding Peter F. Lindley. She was the first female director at ESRF. At ESRF Larsen was responsible for research in the fields of structural biology and structural chemistry and worked alongside a colleague who was responsible for physics research; firstly Italian physicist Francesco Sette [de] and secondly German physicist Harald Reichert [de].

Larsen established an international team of scientists who used synchrotron techniques (micro-X-ray fluorescence (XRF) point analysis, micro X-ray diffraction, micro-infrared spectroscopy and Raman spectroscopy) at the ESRF to investigate the composition of red and black inks inscribed on Ancient Egyptian papyri fragments from the Tebtunis archive, which dated to c. 100–200 CE. The team discovered that lead was added to the ink mixtures as a dryer rather than as a dye and published research in 2020.

During her time at the ESRF, Larsen also launched an initiative proposing an "International Year of Crystallography" to celebrate the centenary of the discovery of X-ray crystallography. The initiative was later declared by the United Nations (UN) in 2012 for 2014. Larsen worked at the ESRF until 2009, then returned to the University of Copenhagen. She was succeeded at ESRF by Serge Pérez.

In 2010, Larsen became interim acting director for MAX-Lab at Lund University in Lund, Sweden at "short notice" during the transition to the MAX IV Laboratory, succeeding Nils Mårtensson. At Max-Lab, Larsen collaborated with Swedish scientist Anders Liljas and they secured funding for a Danish-Swedish partnership to establish the crystallography beamline I911, also known as Cassiopeia. The beamline enhanced the facility’s capabilities for protein crystallography research.

In 2011, Larsen gave a guest lecture at the University of Liverpool in England.

With Sten Rettrup, Larsen investigated the charge distribution of orthoboric acid by using low-temperature X-ray diffraction data and ab initio calculations.

== Awards ==
In 2004, Larsen was awarded an honorary doctorate degree by Lund University in Lund, Sweden.

In 2006, Larsen was elected to the Royal Physiographic Society in Lund.

In 2012, Larsen was a "Guest of Honor" of the National University of the Littoral in Santa Fe, Argentina.

In 2018, Larsen was awarded the tenth Max Perutz Prize by the European Crystallographic Association (ECA) in "recognition of Sine Larsen’s multi-faceted contributions to crystallography, including crystal structure analyses of organic molecules and proteins, charge density studies, and the development of synchrotron radiation facilities."

Larsen was appointed to the Order of the Dannebrog.

== Death ==
Larsen died on 4 January 2025, aged 82.
