= Fritz Laves =

German crystallographer

- Born: 27 February 1906; Hanover, Germany
- Died: 12 August 1978 (aged 72); Laigueglia, Italy
- Education: University of Innsbruck; University of Göttingen; ETH Zurich
- Known for: Laves phase Laves tilings Laves graph Coordination sequence
- Awards: Roebling Medal (1969)
- Scientific career
- Fields: Crystallography
- Workplaces: University of Göttingen; University of Halle; University of Marburg; ETH Zurich
- Doctoral advisor: Paul Niggli
- Notable students: Heinz Jagodzinski

Fritz Henning Emil Paul Berndt Laves (27 February 1906 – 12 August 1978) was a German crystallographer who served as the president of the German Mineralogical Society from 1956 to 1958. He is the namesake of Laves phases and the Laves tilings; the Laves graph, a highly-symmetrical three-dimensional crystal structure that he studied, was named after him by H. S. M. Coxeter.

== Education and career ==
Laves was born in Hanover, the son of a judge and the great-grandson of architect Georg Ludwig Friedrich Laves. He grew up in Göttingen, where his interests included piano music as well as collecting rocks and minerals. He began his university studies in geology in 1924 at the University of Innsbruck, and continued at the University of Göttingen before moving to ETH Zurich for doctoral studies under Paul Niggli.

In 1929 he took a faculty position under Victor Goldschmidt at Göttingen. He tried unsuccessfully to prevent Goldschmidt from being dismissed in 1933, and later had difficulty advancing through the German academic system under the Nazis because he was known as a protector of the Jews. His research at this time largely concerned metals and intermetallic materials. He was drafted into the German army in 1939, but returned to academia after the intervention of Paul Rosbaud, and instead worked on metallurgy for Hermann Göring during the war. On that position

an alchemist was assigned to look over his shoulder, and contributed to the success of his experiments by oscillating a small crystal sphere on a chain over the crucible. He also insisted on adding powdered crocodile bones to the batch, but because of Rommel's difficulties in the land of the Nile, settled for the tail-bones of a lesser lizard.

In 1944 he moved to the University of Halle as director of the Mineralogical Department, and then after World War II he became an ordinary professor at the University of Marburg, where he worked on disordered materials and two-dimensional structures.

By 1948 he had agreed to be taken to America by the U. S. Navy during Operation Paperclip, and began working with Julian Goldsmith at the University of Chicago. At this time, his interests shifted again, to the study of feldspar, one of the minerals he had collected in his youth. Despite having become highly Americanized, he found himself unable to resist an offer to return to ETH Zurich, in 1954, to fill the chair that had been left vacant by the death of his advisor Paul Niggli. He remained in Zurich until his retirement in 1976.

Laves was the editor of the journal Zeitschrift für Kristallographie between 1955 and 1978, which honoured him with a special issue in May 2006 commemorating the hundredth anniversary of his birth. The issue was devoted to the crystal chemistry of intermetallic compounds and included two articles on Laves' contributions to crystallography.

== Personal life ==
Laves was married to architect Melitta Druckenmüller (1907 – 1990), who assisted him with many of the illustrations in his publications. They had three daughters together, Gracia, Charlotte, and Katharina.

== Awards and honors ==
Laves was awarded the Roebling Medal, the highest honor of the Mineralogical Society of America, in 1969. He was a member of the Academy of Sciences Leopoldina, and a corresponding member of the Akademie der Wissenschaften und der Literatur and the Bavarian Academy of Sciences and Humanities. He was also the recipient of an honorary doctorate from the University of Bochum.
