= Zeitschrift für Kristallographie – New Crystal Structures =

- Discipline: Chemistry, Crystallography
- Language: English
- Edited by: Prof. Hubert Huppertz

Publication details
- History: 1997–present Started at volume 212
- Publisher: de Gruyter Brill
- Frequency: Bimonthly

Standard abbreviations
- ISO 4: Z. Kristallogr. NCS

Indexing
- CODEN: ZKNSFT
- ISSN: 1433-7266 (print); 2197-4578 (web)
- LCCN: sn97023098
- OCLC no.: 37393535

Links
- Journal homepage

Zeitschrift für Kristallographie – New Crystal Structures is a bimonthly peer-reviewed scientific journal published in English. Its first issue was published in December 1997 and bore the subtitle "International journal for structural, physical, and chemical aspects of crystalline materials." Created as a spin-off of Zeitschrift für Kristallographie for reporting novel and refined crystal structures, it began at volume 212 in order to remain aligned with the numbering of the parent journal. Paul von Groth, Professor of Mineralogy at the University of Strasbourg, established Zeitschrift für Krystallographie und Mineralogie in 1877; after several name changes, the journal adopted its present name, Zeitschrift für Kristallographie – Crystalline Materials, in 2010.

The inaugural editors-in-chief were Hans Georg von Schnering of the Max Planck Institute for Solid State Research in Stuttgart and Heinz Hermann Schulz of the Ludwig-Maximilians-Universität München. In 2025, the editor-in-chief was Hubert Huppertz (Universität Innsbruck). In the last years (from 2018 on) the journal sharpened its profile as a journal providing new crystal structure determinations (and redeterminations) together with a short description of the source of the material and the most important features of each structure.

Editorial Board

Marek Daszkiewicz, Polish Academy of Science, Wroclaw, Poland; Christian Hübschle, Bayreuth University, Germany; Oliver Janka, Universität des Saarlandes, Germany; Irina S. Konovalova, National Academy of Sciences of Ukraine, Kharkiv; Guido J. Reiss (Managing the acceptance process), Heinrich-Heine-University Düsseldorf, Germany; Marko Rodic, University of Novi Sad, Serbia; Svitlana V. Shishkina, National Academy of Sciences of Ukraine, Kyiw; Edward R. T. Tiekink, University of the Balearic Islands, Spain.

== Abstracting and indexing ==
The journal is abstracted and indexed in:

- Chemical Abstracts Service
- Current Contents/Physical, Chemical and Earth Sciences
- EBSCO databases
- Inspec
- Science Citation Index Expanded
- Scopus
- publons
- Web of Science - Current Contents/Physical, Chemical and Earth Science
- Reaxys
- GoogleScholar
