= Carl Hermann Medal =

Award in the field of crystallography

The Carl Hermann Medal is the highest award in the field of crystallography from the German Crystallographic Society. It is named after the German physicist and professor of crystallography Carl Hermann, who along with Paul Peter Ewald, created the Strukturbericht designation system for crystallographic prototypes. The medal is awarded annually during the annual meeting of the society

== Carl Hermann Medal recipients ==
- 1996 Gerhard Borrmann
- 1997 Hartmut Bärnighausen
- 1998 Siegfried Haussühl
- 1999 George Sheldrick
- 2000 Heinz Jagodzinski
- 2001 Theo Hahn, Hans Wondratschek
- 2002 Friedrich Liebau
- 2003 Hans-Joachim Bunge
- 2004 Wolfram Saenger
- 2005 Peter Paufler
- 2006 Werner Fischer
- 2008 Hans Burzlaff
- 2009 Armin Kirfel
- 2010 Wolfgang Jeitschko
- 2011 Gernot Heger
- 2013 Emil Makovicky
- 2014 Axel T. Brünger
- 2015 Peter Luger
- 2016 Hartmut Fueß
- 2017 Wolfgang Neumann
- 2018 Walter Steurer
- 2019 Georg E. Schulz
- 2020 Dieter Fenske
- 2021 Karl Fischer
- 2022 Wulf Depmeier
- 2023 Rolf Hilgenfeld
- 2024 Juri Grin

== See also ==
- Ewald Prize
