= Gerhard Borrmann =

German physicist

Gerhard Borrmann (30 April 1908 – 12 April 2006) was a German physicist.

He was born in Diedenhofen, then part of Germany, and received his early education there. He continued his secondary school at Gießen, where he apprenticed at a steel mill. After studying at the Technical University of Munich and Technische Hochschule Danzig, he wrote his Ph.D. thesis on the Kossel effect while working at the laboratory of Walther Kossel in Danzig. Following his doctorate, he continued to work at the laboratory as an assistant to Kossel, where he studied X-ray transmission through thin crystal foils. Due to his refusal to join the Nazi Party, he was forced to leave the laboratory in 1938, upon which he went to work with Max von Laue at the Kaiser-Wilhelm-Institut für Physikalische Chemie und Elektrochemie (KWI). There he discovered a phenomenon regarding the anomalous low absorption of X-rays that became known as the "Borrmann effect" (or "Borrmann-Campbell effect", for Herbert N. Campbell.)

Following the war, in 1951 Bormann was offered the Kristalloptik der Röntgenstrahlen department of the KWI. He became a Scientific Fellow in 1956. He was appointed Professor at the Technische Universität Berlin, retiring in 1970. In 1996, the German Crystallographic Society honored Gerhard Borrmann pioneering work in X-ray diffraction with the inaugural Carl Hermann Medal.

== See also ==
- Borrmann effect
