= Otto Stern =

German–American physicist (1888–1969)

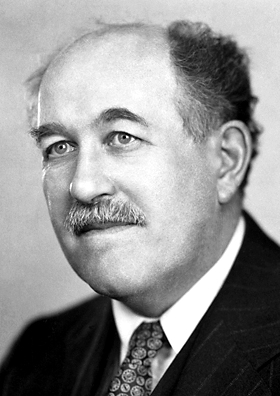
- Stern, 1940s
- Born: 17 February 1888; Sohrau, German Empire
- Died: 17 August 1969 (aged 81); Berkeley, California, U.S.
- Education: University of Breslau (grad. 1912)
- Known for: Measuring the proton magnetic moment; Helium atom scattering; Stern double layer model; Stern–Gerlach experiment; Stern–Volmer relationship
- Relatives: Lieselotte Templeton (niece)
- Awards: Nobel Prize in Physics (1943)
- Scientific career
- Fields: Physics
- Workplaces: University of Frankfurt am Main; University of Rostock; University of Hamburg; Carnegie Institute of Technology
- Doctoral advisor: Otto Sackur

Otto Stern (German: [ˈɔto ˈʃtɛʁn]; 17 February 1888 – 17 August 1969) was a German–American experimental physicist. He is the second most nominated person for a Nobel Prize, with 82 nominations during the years 1925–1945. In 1943, he received the Nobel Prize in Physics "for his contribution to the development of the molecular ray method and his discovery of the magnetic moment of the proton."

== Biography ==
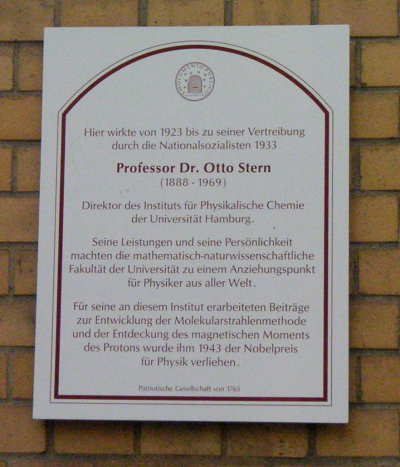
Plaque on the wall of what are now the physics institutes of Hamburg University, commemorating Stern's tenure.

Otto Stern was born on 17 February 1888 in Sohrau (now Żory, Poland), Germany, into a Jewish family. In 1892, he moved with his parents to Breslau (now Wrocław, Poland). He studied in Freiburg im Breisgau, Munich, and Breslau.

In 1912, Stern received his Ph.D. in Physical Chemistry from the University of Breslau, with a thesis on the kinetic theory of osmotic pressure in concentrated solutions. He then followed Albert Einstein to Charles University in Prague, and in 1913 to ETH Zurich, where he became a Privatdozent in Physical Chemistry. The following year, he moved to the University of Frankfurt am Main as a Privatdozent in Theoretical Physics. In 1921, he was appointed Associate Professor of Theoretical Physics at the University of Rostock, and then Professor of Physical Chemistry and director of the laboratory at the University of Hamburg in 1923.

In 1930, Stern received an LL.D. from the University of California, Berkeley (UC Berkeley), where he was a frequent visiting professor during the 1930s, becoming close colleagues with members of the Berkeley faculty, including chemistry dean Gilbert Lewis, whom Stern would nominate for the Nobel Prize in Chemistry in 1933. After resigning from his post at the University of Hamburg in 1933 because of the Nazis' Machtergreifung (seizure of power), he found refuge in the city of Pittsburgh, becoming Professor of Physics at the Carnegie Institute of Technology.

As an experimental physicist, Stern contributed to the discovery of spin quantization in the Stern–Gerlach experiment with Walther Gerlach in February 1922 at the Physikalischer Verein in Frankfurt am Main. With his life-long collaborator Immanuel Estermann, he demonstrated of the wave nature of atoms and molecules; measurement of atomic magnetic moments; discovery of the proton's magnetic moment; and development of the molecular beam method which is utilized for the technique of molecular beam epitaxy.

After Stern retired from the Carnegie Institute of Technology in 1945, he moved to Berkeley, California. He was a regular visitor to the physics colloquium at UC Berkeley. He died of a heart attack on 17 August 1969 in Berkeley, at the age of 81.

His niece was the crystallographer Lieselotte Templeton.

== Recognition ==
=== Awards ===
Year	Organization	Award	Citation	Ref.
1943	(Sweden) Royal Swedish Academy of Sciences	Nobel Prize in Physics	"For his contribution to the development of the molecular ray method and his discovery of the magnetic moment of the proton."	

=== Memberships ===
Year	Organization	Type	Ref.
1945	(United States) National Academy of Sciences	Member	
1946	(United States) American Philosophical Society	Member	

== Commemoration ==
The Stern–Gerlach Medal of the German Physical Society awarded for excellence in experimental physics is named after him and Gerlach.

== See also ==
- List of German inventors and discoverers
- List of Jewish Nobel laureates

== Sources ==
- Horst Schmidt-Böcking and Karin Reich: Otto Stern. Physiker Querdenker, Nobelpreisträger. Societäts-Verlag, Frankfurt am Main 2011, ISBN 978-3-942921-23-7.
- Toennies, J.P.; Schmidt-Böcking, H.; Friedrich, B.; Lower, J.C.A. (2011). "Otto Stern (1888–1969): The founding father of experimental atomic physics". Annalen der Physik. 523 (12): 1045–1070. arXiv:1109.4864. Bibcode:2011AnP...523.1045T. doi:10.1002/andp.201100228. S2CID 119204397.
- National Academy of Sciences - Otto Stern (englisch; PDF; 1,0 MB)
