= Stefanie Tschegg =

Austrian scientist

Stefanie Tschegg (born 7 July 1943 in Graz) is an emeritus at the University of Natural Resources and Life Sciences, Vienna.

== Life ==
Tschegg received her doctoral degree from the University of Vienna in 1971. From 1980 to 1981, she was a visiting associate professor at Massachusetts Institute of Technology. She finished her habilitation in physics in 1982. In 1989, she became a professor of physics at the University of Natural Resources and Life Sciences, Vienna.

== Research ==
Some of her research interests are:

- Structure, mechanical and fracture mechanical properties of different materials
- Development and application of material testing methods (especially methods based on ultrasonic)

== Selected publications ==
Three of her most-cited publications:

- Mayer, H; Papakyriacou, M; Zettl, B; Stanzl-Tschegg, S. E (2003-03-01). "Influence of porosity on the fatigue limit of die cast magnesium and aluminium alloys". International Journal of Fatigue. 25 (3): 245–256. doi:10.1016/S0142-1123(02)00054-3. ISSN 0142-1123.
- Stanzl-Tschegg, S. E.; Mayer, H. (2001-01-01). "Fatigue and fatigue crack growth of aluminium alloys at very high numbers of cycles". International Journal of Fatigue. 23: 231–237. doi:10.1016/S0142-1123(01)00167-0. ISSN 0142-1123.
- Stanzl-Tschegg, Stefanie E.; Tan, Dong-Ming; Tschegg, Elmar Karl (1995-01-01). "New splitting method for wood fracture characterization". Wood Science and Technology. 29 (1): 31–50. doi:10.1007/BF00196930. ISSN 1432-5225. S2CID 33170974.

== Awards ==
- 1977 Theodor Körner Award
- 1983 Kardinal Innitzer Award
- 2006 Tammann Commemorative Medal of DGM (German Association of Material Scientists)
- 2011 Honorary Member of German Association for Materials Science and Testing (DVM)
