= Birgit Skrotzki =

- Education: Ruhr University Bochum
- Awards: Tammann Commemorative Medal, 2016
- Scientific career
- Workplaces: Ruhr University Bochum, University of Virginia, Federal Institute for Materials Research and Testing, Technische Universität Berlin

Birgit Skrotzki (born 1963 in Bochum) is the head of the division Experimental and Model Based Mechanical Behaviour of Materials at the Federal Institute for Materials Research and Testing and an extraordinary professor at Technische Universität Berlin.

== Education ==
Skrotzki received her diploma in Mechanical Engineering (specialization in Materials Science) at the Ruhr University Bochum in 1987. From 1993 to 1995, she was a research associate in the Dept. of Materials Science and Engineering at the University of Virginia. In 1992, she finished her doctorate on Temperatures and Course of Martensitic Transformation in Iron Alloys. From 1995 to 2003, she was the head of the Light Metals group at the Institute for Materials at the Ruhr University Bochum. From 1998 to 2003, she was also the chief engineer at the Institute of Materials at the Ruhr University Bochum. In 2000, she completed her habilitation on Mechanical Loading of Light Alloys at Elevated Temperature. In 2003, she became head of the division "Experimental and Model Based Mechanical Behaviour of Materials" at the Federal Institute for Materials Research and Testing. In 2011, she also became an extraordinary professor at Technische Universität Berlin.

== Research ==
She is a specialist in High-Temperature Materials.

Her research focuses on the following topics:

- Mechanical Behaviour of metals and composites at high temperature and under complex loading
- Relationship between microstructure and mechanical properties
- Microstructural stability

== Selected publications ==
Hornbogen, Erhard; Skrotzki, Birgit (2009). Mikro- und Nanoskopie der Werkstoffe. Berlin, Heidelberg: Springer-Verlag Berlin Heidelberg. ISBN 978-3-540-89946-4. OCLC 699260538.

== Awards ==
- Buehler Award for the best technical publication in "Practical Metallography" in 1997
- Tammann Commemorative Medal of the Deutsche Gesellschaft für Materialkunde in 2016
