= Ralf Riedel =

German scientist

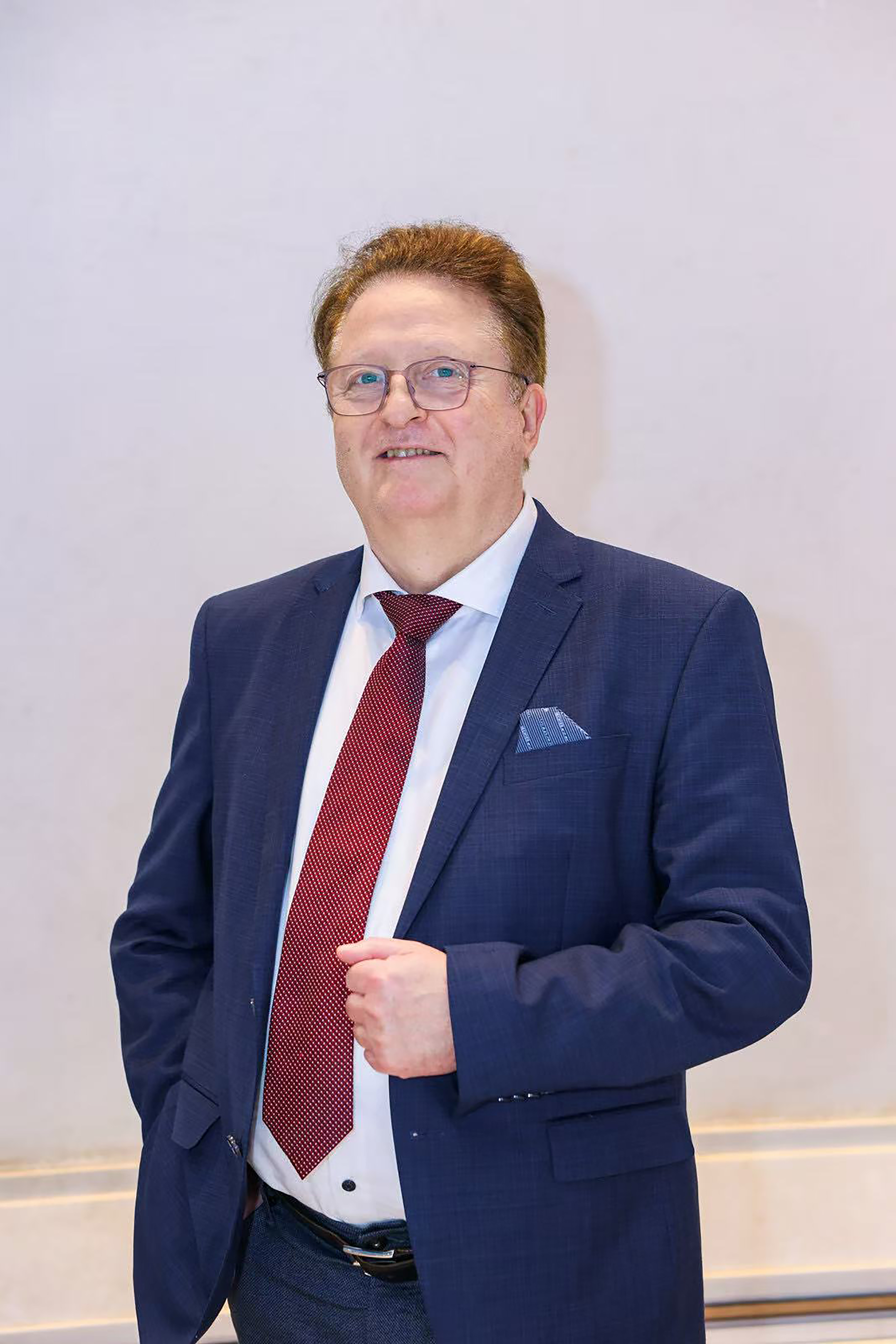
Ralf Riedel

Ralf Riedel (born 11 February 1956) is a German professor of Materials Science at the Technical University of Darmstadt (TU Darmstadt) in Germany. He has contributed to several topics in applied materials science. These topics include ceramics, polymer-derived ceramics (PDCs), and high-performance materials. At the Technical University of Darmstadt, Riedel established and led the Dispersive Solids Group at the Institute of Materials Science, which developed polymer-derived ceramics (PDCs), high-temperature materials, and functional ceramics for structural and electronic applications.

== Education and career ==
Riedel studied chemistry at the University of Stuttgart with his Diploma Thesis concerning Versuche zur Reduktion von Aldehyden mit weißem Phosphor (Experiments on the reduction of aldehydes with white phosphorus). From 1984, he pursued a Ph.D. in the field of Inorganic Chemistry at the University of Stuttgart. In 1986, he graduated with his dissertation Weißer Phosphor als Edukt für die Synthese phosphororganischer Verbindungen (White phosphorus as a starting material for the synthesis of organophosphorus compounds). He undertook postdoctoral research at Max Planck- Institute for Metals Research, Institute for Materials Research, PML, Stuttgart in materials processing and characterization techniques. Between 1986 and 1992, he worked on his habilitation concerning Nicht-oxidische Keramiken aus anorganischen Vorstufen (Non-oxide ceramics from inorganic precursors) under the supervision of Gerd Becker and Fritz Aldinger.

== Research contributions ==
Riedel's contributions mainly focused on polymer-derived ceramics as well as high pressure materials synthesis. His work included theory, synthesis, and practical applications. His work on PDCs enabed the production of materials with tailored properties. Research into PDCs has extended their use to fields like aerospace engineering and microelectronics. His work on high-temperature ceramics advanced the understanding of the thermal stability, creep resistance, and oxidation behavior of ceramics under extreme conditions. In the area of ceramic composites, he has developed lightweight, high-strength materials by integrating ceramic matrices with other reinforcing materials with potential diverse potential applications. In recent years, Riedel's research has focused on sustainable materials and processes in ceramics manufacturing.

== Collaboration with industry ==
Throughout his career, Riedel has worked closely with industrial partners to ensure the translation of his research into practical applications. He has collaborated with companies in sectors such as aerospace, automotive and energy. He has served on the advisory board of the Fraunhofer Institute for Interfacial Engineering and Biotechnology (IGB), an applied research institute.

== Recognition ==
- 1999: Dionyz-Stur-Gold Medal for Merits in Natural Science, Slovak Academy of Science, Bratislava, Slovak Republic
- 2000: Fellow of "The American Ceramic Society" (USA)
- 2006: Honorary Doctor (Dr. h. c.) of the Slovak Academy of Sciences, Bratislava, Slovak Republic
- 2009: Honorary Professor (Prof. h. c.) of the Tianjin University, Tianjin, P.R. China
- 2012: Tammann-Gedenkmünze of the Deutschen Gesellschaft für Materialkunde
- 2013: Fellow of the European Ceramic Society
- 2014: Fellow of the School of Engineering at The University of Tokyo, Japan
- 2020: International Ceramics Prize 2020 for "Basic Science" of the World Academy of Ceramics
- 2021: Honorary Professor (Prof. h. c.) of the Xiamen University, Xiamen, P.R. China
- 2023: Elected Member of the International Institute for the Science of Sintering

== Editorial activities ==
- Since 2016: an editor-in-chief of the journal Ceramics International
- Since 2016: member of the editorial board of the Journal of Ceramic Science and Technology
- Editor, Journal of the American Ceramic Society
- 2023–2025: Associate Editor, Nature Portfolio Journal Advanced Manufacturing

== Selected publications ==
- Lu, Li; Wen, Tonghui; Li, Wei; Wen, Qingbo; Yu, Zhaoju; Tao, Shasha; Yang, Jincan; Wang, Yalei; Luan, Xingang; Xiong, Xiang; Riedel, Ralf (2024). "Single-source-precursor synthesis of dense monolithic SiC/(Ti0.25Zr0.25Hf0.25Ta0.25)C ceramic nanocomposite with excellent high-temperature oxidation resistance". Journal of the European Ceramic Society. 44 (2): 595–609. doi:10.1016/j.jeurceramsoc.2023.09.074.
- Tian, Honghong; Graczyk-Zajac, Magdalena; Kessler, Alois; Weidenkaff, Anke; Riedel, Ralf (2024). "Recycling and Reusing of Graphite from Retired Lithium-ion Batteries: A Review". Advanced Materials. 36 (13) 2308494. doi:10.1002/adma.202308494. ISSN 0935-9648. PMID 38102959.
- Liu, Jiongjie; Dong, Changyu; Lu, Xuefeng; Qiao, Zhuhui; Zhou, Feng; Liu, Weimin; Riedel, Ralf (2022). "Sn-containing Si3N4-based composites for adaptive excellent friction and wear in a wide temperature range". Journal of the European Ceramic Society. 42 (3): 913–920. doi:10.1016/j.jeurceramsoc.2021.10.047.
- Bhat, Shrikant; Wiehl, Leonore; Haseen, Shariq; Kroll, Peter; Glazyrin, Konstantin; Gollé-Leidreiter, Philipp; Kolb, Ute; Farla, Robert; Tseng, Jo-Chi; Ionescu, Emanuel; Katsura, Tomoo; Riedel, Ralf (17 February 2020). "A Novel High-Pressure Tin Oxynitride Sn 2 N 2 O". Chemistry – A European Journal. 26 (10): 2187–2194. doi:10.1002/chem.201904529. ISSN 0947-6539. PMC 7065226. PMID 31671223.
- Taniguchi, Takashi; Dzivenko, Dmytro; Riedel, Ralf; Chauveau, Thierry; Zerr, Andreas (2019). "Synthesis of cubic zirconium(IV) nitride, c-Zr3N4, in the 6–8 GPa pressure region". Ceramics International. 45 (16): 20028–20032. doi:10.1016/j.ceramint.2019.06.263.
- Reinold, Lukas Mirko; Yamada, Yuto; Graczyk-Zajac, Magdalena; Munakata, Hirokazu; Kanamura, Kiyoshi; Riedel, Ralf (2015). "The influence of the pyrolysis temperature on the electrochemical behavior of carbon-rich SiCN polymer-derived ceramics as anode materials in lithium-ion batteries". Journal of Power Sources. 282: 409–415. doi:10.1016/j.jpowsour.2015.02.074.
- Bekheet, Maged F.; Schwarz, Marcus R.; Lauterbach, Stefan; Kleebe, Hans-Joachim; Kroll, Peter; Riedel, Ralf; Gurlo, Aleksander (17 June 2013). "Orthorhombic In 2 O 3 : A Metastable Polymorph of Indium Sesquioxide". Angewandte Chemie International Edition. 52 (25): 6531–6535. doi:10.1002/anie.201300644. ISSN 1433-7851. PMID 23650154.
- Sen, Sabyasachi; Widgeon, Scarlett J.; Navrotsky, Alexandra; Mera, Gabriela; Tavakoli, Amir; Ionescu, Emanuel; Riedel, Ralf (2013). "Carbon substitution for oxygen in silicates in planetary interiors". Proceedings of the National Academy of Sciences. 110 (40): 15904–15907. doi:10.1073/pnas.1312771110. ISSN 0027-8424. PMC 3791772. PMID 24043830.
- Horvath-Bordon, Elisabeta; Riedel, Ralf; McMillan, Paul F.; Kroll, Peter; Miehe, Gerhard; van Aken, Peter A.; Zerr, Andreas; Hoppe, Peter; Shebanova, Olga; McLaren, Ian; Lauterbach, Stefan; Kroke, Edwin; Boehler, Reinhard (19 February 2007). "High-Pressure Synthesis of Crystalline Carbon Nitride Imide, C 2 N 2 (NH)". Angewandte Chemie International Edition. 46 (9): 1476–1480. doi:10.1002/anie.200603851. ISSN 1433-7851. PMID 17221897.
- Zerr, Andreas; Miehe, Gerhard; Serghiou, George; Schwarz, Marcus; Kroke, Edwin; Riedel, Ralf; Fueß, Hartmut; Kroll, Peter; Boehler, Reinhard (1999). "Synthesis of cubic silicon nitride". Nature. 400 (6742): 340–342. doi:10.1038/22493. ISSN 0028-0836.
