= Rysensteen Gymnasium =

School in Copenhagen, Denmark

Coordinates: 55°40′12.76″N 12°33′47.13″E

Rysensteen Gymnasium (2007)

Rysensteen Gymnasium is a gymnasium (upper secondary school) in Copenhagen, Denmark

The school was established in 1881 as Laura Engelhardts Skole ("Laura Engelhardt's School") at Stormgade 16. In 1895 the school was moved to Rysensteensgade 3, and after being taken over by the Copenhagen Municipality renamed Rysensteen Gymnasium. In 1932 the school moved to Tietensgade. Around the turn of the millennium the school got new classrooms in The Brown Kødby old stables, for the subjects geography, visual arts, chemistry, biology and physics. In 2002 the main building was renovated, and in 2003 a new music room was built.

In 2011 the School chose to rent additional classrooms in The White Kødby because of space constraints, the classrooms are located 7-8 minutes by foot, from the school's main building.

== Notable alumni ==
With graduation dates:

- 1931 Kirsten Auken – medical doctor
- 1944 Bodil Udsen – actress
- 1955 Ester Larsen – politician
- 1966 Karen Jespersen – politician
- 1983 Line Barfod - politician
- 1983 Naser Khader – politician
- 1987 Manu Sareen - politician, writer of children's books
- 1992 Iben Claces - writer
- Sine Larsen (1943–2025), chemist and crystallographer

== Principals ==
- 1919-1931 Maria Nielsen (1882–1931)
- 1931-1950 Anne Marie Bo (1885–1972)
- 1950-1963 Aagot Lading (1909–1963)
- 1963-1970 Svend Atke (1910–1993)
- 1970-1994 Birthe Christensen (1927-
- 1994-1999 Johannes Nymark (1944-
- 1.10.1999- Gitte Harding Transbøl
