= Wilhelmine Mimi Johnson =

Norwegian geologist and physician (1890-1980)

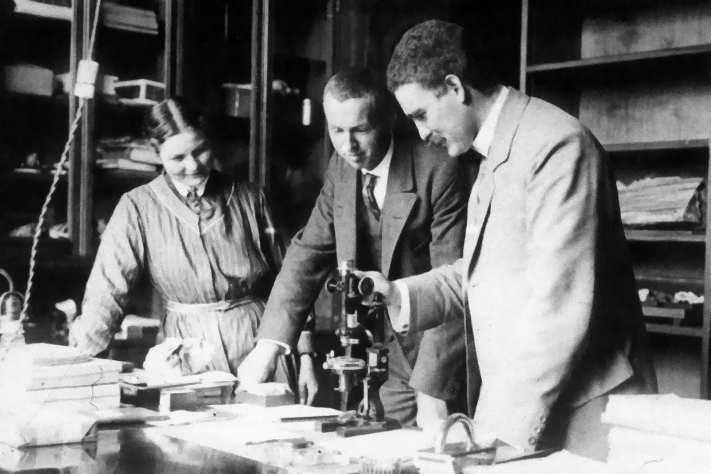
Mimi Johnson (left), Endre Berner (centre), Victor Moritz Goldschmidt (right). Geological Museum, Oslo, 1915

Wilhelmine Mimi Johnson, also known as Mimi Johnson, (born 1 August 1890 in Tynset Municipality, died 12 January 1980 in Skedsmo Municipality) was Norway's first female geologist and a photographer. Later she became a physician.

== Life and work ==
Johnson was born 1 August 1890 to solicitor Sam Johnson and Elise Johnson (née Holmboe).

She entered the mining degree program at the University of Oslo at 17, becoming the youngest student and the only woman in the program. Her father had encouraged her course of study because the mining field was booming at the time. She financially supported herself by teaching mathematics and languages to students at two schools: Ragna Nielsen's school and Olav Berg's girls' school. She also received support by way of education loans directed to female students. In addition, she tutored private students at her home and read Latin with fellow students studying pharmacy. She graduated in 1912 as a mining engineer.

=== Geologist ===
As Norway's first female geologist, she worked closely for several years with two of the most prominent professors at the University of Oslo, Waldemar Christofer Brøgger and Victor Moritz Goldschmidt. During the summer of 1912, Johnson was named an assistant to Brøgger who was mapping the Kristiania field near Oslo, but the experience proved costly because Brøgger's expensive choices for the team's boarding and dining on field trips were a drain on her limited income.

In the summer of 1913, she worked for Goldschmidt doing fieldwork south of Røros and was part of the team that excavated a field of fossil plants. From both geologists, she received warm thanks but she remained unmentioned in the papers they published about their collective work. She authored her first paper in 1917 about a fossil whale discovered in Rekkevik, Norway.

Johnson was employed by the Geological Survey of Norway and was, among other things, one of the first people to take pictures inside the mines at Kongsberg, though later her presence in the photos caused some archivists to ask if she was the photographer's wife. In 1917, Johnson became the conservator at the Geological Museum in Tøyen where she was paid half the standard wage and told it was because, "…in women's hours you can iron your own blouses and cook your own food."

In 1930, she left geology to become a physician. She graduated medical school and ran her own medical practice in Lillestrøm from 1940 to 1975.

=== Personal life ===
In 1920 was married briefly to the merchant Eivind Høst. Although they divorced in 1924, Johnson was sometimes known thereafter as Mimi Johnson Høst.
