= Borrmann effect =

The Borrmann effect (or Borrmann–Campbell effect after Gerhard Borrmann and Herbert N. Campbell) is the anomalous increase in the intensity of X-rays transmitted through a crystal when it is being set up for Bragg reflection.

The Borrmann effect—a dramatic increase in transparency to X-ray beams—is observed when X-rays satisfying Bragg's law diffract through a perfect crystal. The minimization of absorption seen in the Borrmann effect has been explained by noting that the electric field of the X-ray beam approaches zero amplitude at the crystal planes, thus avoiding the atoms.
