= Ute Kolb =

German crystallographer (born 1963)

Ute Kolb (born 1963) is a German crystallographer whose research develops techniques in electron crystallography and applies them in investigating the structure and properties of both organic and inorganic compounds. She is known for her development of automated electron diffraction tomography. She heads the Centre for High Resolution Electron Microscopy at the University of Mainz, where she is a Privatdozent; she also holds a part-time professorship in the Faculty of Materials Sciences and Geo Sciences at Technische Universität Darmstadt.

== Education and career ==
Kolb was born in 1963 in Bingen am Rhein. Her parents, an X-ray technician and medical assistant, also ran a fish farm. As a student at the Hildegardis-Schule Bochum, she planned to become a mathematics or physics teacher, but shifted her interests to chemistry late in her studies there. She studied chemistry at RPTU University Kaiserslautern-Landau and the University of Mainz, initially focusing on physical chemistry. She received a diploma (the German equivalent of a master's degree) in 1989 at the University of Mainz, advised by Markus Antonietti; it was in this period that her interests shifted to crystallography. She continued her studies at the University of Mainz, completing a Ph.D. there in 1994, advised by Martin Dräger. She has a 2015 habilitation, also from the University of Mainz.

From 1994 to 1998 she was a postdoctoral researcher for Ingrid Voigt-Martin at the University of Mainz. She held an assistant professor position at the University of Mainz from 1998 to 2004, and became head of the Centre for High Resolution Electron Microscopy in 2001. She has been a Privatdozent at the university since 2015, and held a part-time professorship at TU Darmstadt from 2012 to 2014 and again beginning in 2017.

Kolb has chaired the German Crystallographic Society since 2015.

== Recognition ==
Kolb was a 2020 recipient of the Gjønnes Medal in Electron Crystallography of the International Union of Crystallography, awarded jointly with Sven Hovmöller. She was elected to the Academia Europaea in 2023.
