= Maria Nielsen =

Danish historian and headmistress

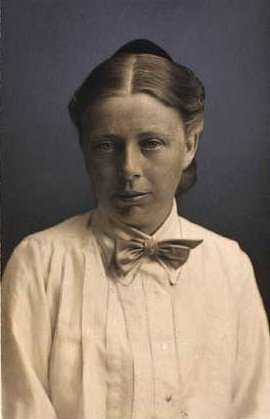
Maria Nielsen (1931)

Maria Nielsen (1882–1931) was a Danish historian and headmistress. In 1919, she became one of the first women in Denmark to head a public high school when she was appointed rector of Rysensteen Gymnasium in Copenhagen. She was particularly attentive to pupils from needy homes and strove to provide better living conditions for her female students. Nielsen also published well-sourced history textbooks in an attempt to move away from rote learning. In 1926, she was behind the establishment of Denmark's History Teachers' Union (Historielærerforening) which she chaired until her death. She was also active in the educational activities of the League of Nations, participating in sessions held in Geneva.

== Early life and education ==
Born in Vemmetofte Parish, Faxe Municipality, on 20 September 1882, Maria Nielsen was the daughter of the physician Rudolf Rasmus Nielsen (1842–97) and his wife Amalia Marie née Schindel (1845–1922), As the family's only child, after her father's death when she was 15, she was able to continue her education at Frederiksberg Realskole in 1904. In 1910, she earned a master's degree in history, Latin and English at the University of Copenhagen and went on to win the university's gold medal in 1912 for defending her thesis De ikke-nordiske Landes Deltagelse i Handelen paa Nord- og Østersøen i 1500- og 1600-Tallet (Participation of non-nordic countries in trade on the North and the Baltic Seas in the 16th and 17th centuries).

== Career ==
Although she continued her interest in history, she devoted her attention to teaching at N. Zahle's School, Marie Kruse's School and in particular at Laura Engelhard's School which in 1919 was acquired by Copenhagen Municipality and renamed Rysensteen Gymnasium. That year she was appointed rector or headmistress as Laura Engelhardt was not sufficiently qualified. She was one of the first three women to be appointed rector of a public gymnasium, the others being Antoinette Dickmeiss and Karen Kjær.

In 1929–30, she published her two-volume Nordic history textbook for gymnasiums: Lærebog i Nordens Historie for Gymnasiet Based on the most recent findings and richly illustrated, it was designed to provide easier access to the subject and was used in no less than 48 gymnasium classes.

Nielsen was particularly attentive to pupils from needy backgrounds and strove to provide better accommodation for her female students. She was active in union circles; in 1926 she founded Denmark's History Teachers Union, chairing it for the remainder of her life. She played an active role in the educational activities of the League of Nations, participating in its sessions in Geneva.

Maria Nielsen died in Copenhagen on 11 September 1931, aged only 49. She was buried in Vemmetofte Cemetery.
