= Victor Goldschmidt =

Norwegian mineralogist (1888–1947)

Victor Goldschmidt ForMemRS
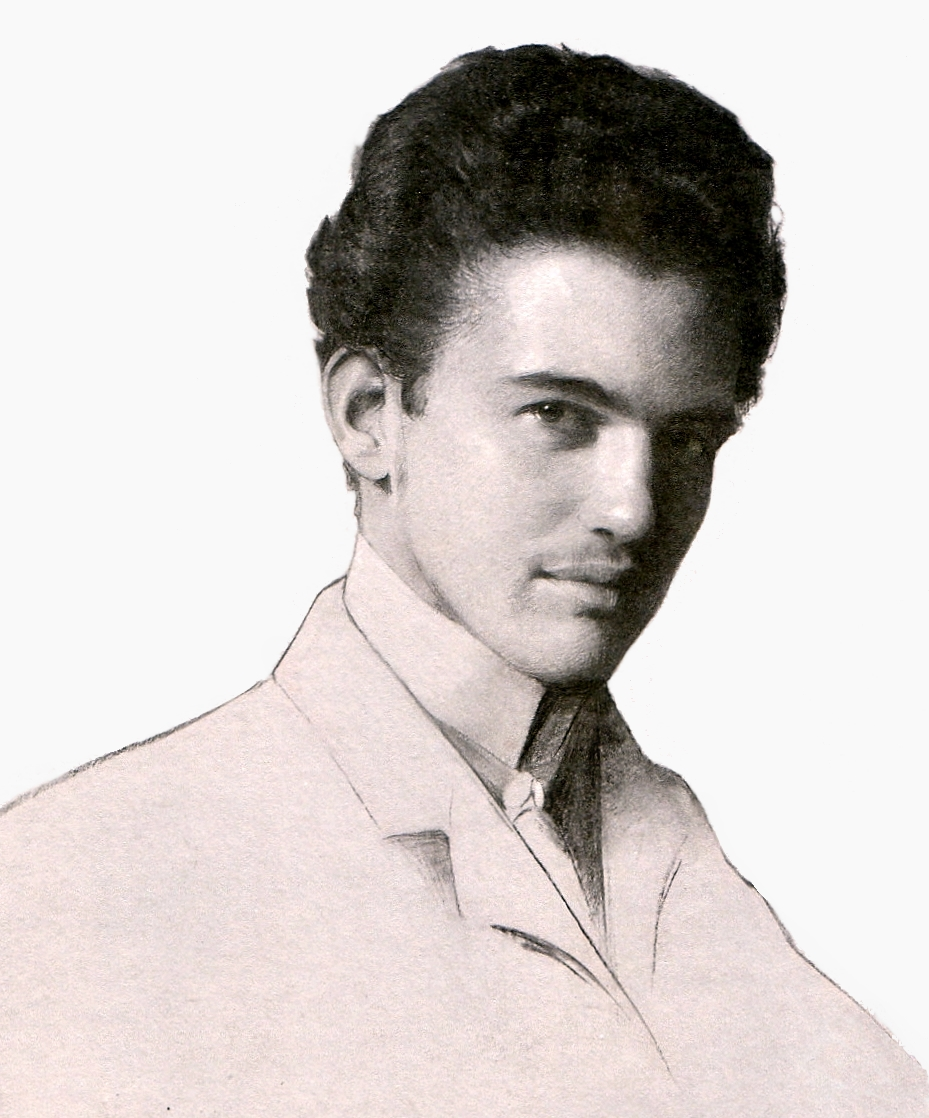
- Young Victor Goldschmidt
- Born: Victor Moritz Goldschmidt; 27 January 1888; Zürich, Switzerland
- Died: 20 March 1947 (aged 59); Oslo, Norway
- Citizenship: Norway
- Education: University of Oslo
- Known for: Geochemistry; Goldschmidt tolerance factor Lanthanide contraction
- Father: Heinrich Jacob Goldschmidt
- Awards: Elliott Cresson Medal (1903); Wollaston Medal (1944)
- Scientific career
- Fields: Geochemistry
- Workplaces: University of Oslo; University of Göttingen; Macaulay Institute for Soil Research; Rothamsted Research
- Thesis: Die Kontaktmetamorphose im Kristianiagebiet and Geologisch-petrographische Studien im Hochgebirge des südlichen Norwegens (1911)
- Doctoral advisor: Waldemar C. Brøgger
- Doctoral students: Brian Harold Mason; Katharina Boll-Dornberger; William Houlder Zachariasen

Victor Moritz Goldschmidt ForMemRS (27 January 1888 – 20 March 1947) was a Norwegian-Jewish mineralogist considered (together with Vladimir Vernadsky) to be the founder of modern geochemistry and crystal chemistry, developer of the Goldschmidt Classification of elements.

== Early life and education ==
Goldschmidt was born in Zürich, Switzerland on 27 January 1888. His father, Heinrich Jacob Goldschmidt, (1857–1937) was a physical chemist at the Eidgenössisches Polytechnikum and his mother, Amelie Koehne (1864–1929), was the daughter of a lumber merchant. They named him Viktor after a colleague of Heinrich, Victor Meyer. His father's family was Jewish back to at least 1600 and mostly highly educated, with rabbis, judges, lawyers and military officers among their numbers. As his father's career progressed, the family moved first to Amsterdam in 1893, to Heidelberg in 1896, and finally to Kristiania (later Oslo), Norway in 1901, where he took over the physical chemistry chair at the university. The family became Norwegian citizens in 1905.

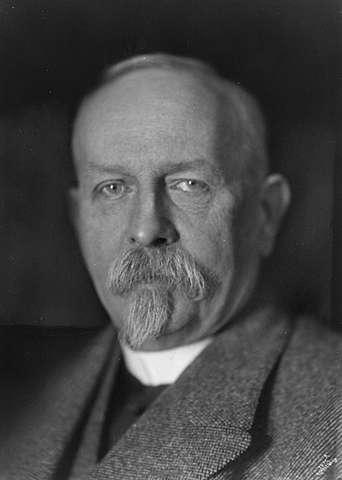
Brøgger in 1922

Goldschmidt entered the University of Kristiania (later the University of Oslo) in 1906 and studied inorganic and physical chemistry, geology, mineralogy, physics, mathematics, zoology and botany. He secured a fellowship for his doctoral studies from the university at the age of 21 (1909). He worked on his thesis with the noted geologist Waldemar Christofer Brøgger and obtained his Norwegian doctor’s degree when he was 23 years old (1911). For his dissertation titled Die Kontaktmetamorphose im Kristianiagebiet ("The Contact Metamorphism in the Kristiania Region"), the Norwegian Academy of Sciences awarded him the Fridtjof Nansen award in 1912. The same year he was made Docent (Associate Professor) of Mineralogy and Petrography at the university.

== Career ==
In 1914 Goldschmidt applied for a professorship in Stockholm and was offered the position. To entice him to stay, the University of Kristiania persuaded the government to establish a mineralogical institute with a professorship for him. In 1929 Goldschmidt was appointed the chair of mineralogy in Göttingen, and he hired Reinhold Mannkopff and Fritz Laves as his assistants. However, after the rise of the Nazis to power, he became unhappy with the treatment of non-Aryans like himself (although the university treated him well) and he resigned in 1935 and returned to Oslo. In 1937, he was invited by the Royal Society of Chemistry to give the Hugo Müller lecture.

On 9 April 1940 the Germans invaded Norway. On 26 October 1942 Goldschmidt was arrested at the orders of the German occupying powers as part of the persecution of Jews in Norway during World War II. Taken to the Berg concentration camp, he became seriously ill and after a stay in a hospital near Oslo, he was released on 8 November, only to be rearrested on 25 November. However, as he was on the pier and about to be deported to Auschwitz, he was freed because some colleagues had persuaded the chief of police that his scientific expertise was essential to the state. Goldschmidt soon fled to Sweden.

Goldschmidt was flown to England on 3 March 1943 by a British intelligence unit, and provided information about technical developments in Norway. After a short period of uncertainty about his future status, he was assigned to the Macaulay Institute for Soil Research (in Aberdeen) of the Agricultural Research Council. He participated in discussions about the German use of raw materials and production of heavy water. He attended open meetings in Cambridge, Manchester, Sheffield, Edinburgh and Aberdeen and lectured at the British Coal Utilisation Research Association on the presence of rare elements in coal ash. His British professional associates and contacts included Leonard Hawkes, C E Tilley and W H Bragg, J D Bernal, Dr W G (later Sir William) Ogg.

Goldschmidt moved from Aberdeen to Rothamsted, where he was popular and nicknamed ‘Goldie’. However, he wanted to go back to Oslo – not welcomed by all Norwegians – and returned there on 26 June 1946, but died soon after, at age 59.

== Scientific work ==
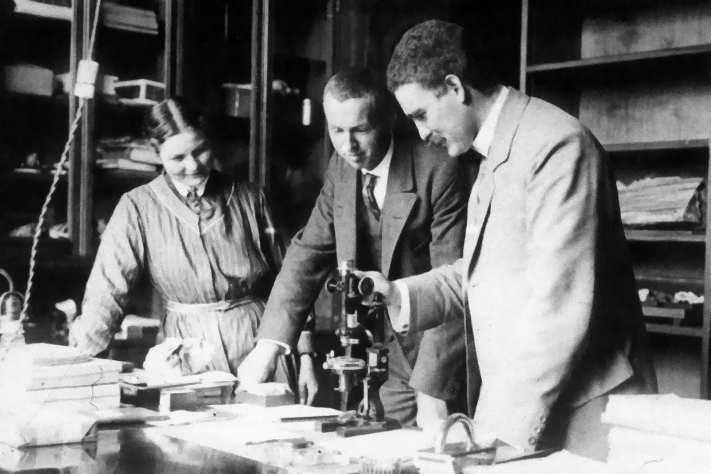
Mimi Johnson (left), Endre Berner (center), Victor Moritz Goldschmidt (right), 1915

For his thesis, Goldschmidt studied the Oslo graben, a valley formed by the downward displacement of a block of land along faults on each side. The region had recently been mapped by Brøgger. In the Permian, magmas intruded into the older rocks, heating the surrounding rock. This resulted in mineralogical changes known as contact metamorphism, resulting in a fine-grained class of rocks known as hornfels. Goldschmidt made a systematic study of the hornfels. He showed that, of the minerals to be found in the hornfels, only certain associations occurred. For example, andalusite could be associated with cordierite but never with hypersthene.

Phase diagram of Al_{2}SiO_{5}

From his data on the hornfels, Goldschmidt deduced a mineralogical phase rule. It is a special case of the Gibbs' phase rule for phases in thermodynamic equilibrium with each other, which states that

$$C - P = F - 2,$$

where C is the minimum number of chemical components, P is the number of phases, and F is the number of degrees of freedom (e.g., temperature and pressure) that can vary without changing C or P. As an example, the chemical compound Al_{2}SiO_{5} can occur naturally as three different minerals: andalusite, kyanite and sillimanite. There is a single component (C = 1), so if all three minerals coexist (P = 3), then F = 0. That is, there are no degrees of freedom, so there is only one possible combination of pressure and temperature. This corresponds to the triple point in the phase diagram.

If the same mineral association is found in several rocks over some region, it must have crystallized at a range of temperatures and pressures. In that case, F must have been at least 2, so

$$C \geq P.$$

This expresses Goldschmidt's mineralogical phase rule: the number of phases is no greater than the number of components.

In the early 20th century, Max von Laue and William L. Bragg showed that X-ray scattering could be used to determine the structures of crystals. In the 1920s and 1930s, Goldschmidt and associates at Oslo and Göttingen applied these methods to many common minerals and formulated a set of rules for how elements are grouped. Goldschmidt published this work in the series Geochemische Verteilungsgesetze der Elemente [Geochemical Laws of the Distribution of Elements].

== Bibliography ==
The majority of Goldschmidt's publications are in German or Norwegian. His English textbook, Geochemistry, was edited and published posthumously in 1954. A complete list of his bibliography is compiled elsewhere.

=== Books ===
- Goldschmidt, Victor Moritz (1906). Die Pyrolumineszenz des Quarzes (in German). Kristiania: Dybwad. OCLC 257009954.
- Goldschmidt, V.M. (1911). Die Kontaktmetamorphose im Kristianiagebiet (in German). Kristiania: In kommission bei J. Dybwad. OCLC 3566635.
- Goldschmidt, Victor Moritz (1916). Geologisch-petrographische Studien im Hochgebirge des südlichen Norwegens [4] [4] (in German). OCLC 883996045.
- Goldschmidt, Victor Moritz (1922). Der Stoffwechsel der Erde (in German). Kristiania: Dybwad in Komm. OCLC 633929580. "mit 2 Textfig."
- Goldschmidt, V.M.; Johnson, Erling (1922). Glimmermineralernes betydning som kalikilde for planterne (in Norwegian). Kristiania: I kommission hos H. Aschehoug & Co. OCLC 712388880.
- Goldschmidt, Victor Moritz (1923). Geochemische Verteilungsgesetze der Elemente (in German). Kristiania, Oslo. OCLC 316398946.
- Goldschmidt, Victor Moritz (1926). Die Gesetze der Krystallochemie (in German). OCLC 174577644.
- Goldschmidt, Victor Moritz (1926). Ueber die Kristallstrukturen vom Rutiltypus, mit Bemerkungen zur Geochemie zweiwertiger und vierwertiger Elemente (in German). Oslo: I komm. Dybwad. OCLC 603709988.
- Goldschmidt, V.M. (1927). Untersuchungen über Bau und Eigenschaften von Krystallen (in German). Oslo: I kommisjon hos J. Dybwad. OCLC 83967999.
- Goldschmidt, Victor Moritz (1931). Elemente und Minerale pegmatitischer Gesteine (in German). OCLC 73005331.
- Goldschmidt, Victor Moritz; Peters, Cl. (1931). Zur Geochemie des Galliums (in German). OCLC 73005336.
- Goldschmidt, Victor Moritz; Peters, Cl. (1931). Zur Geochemie des Scandiums (in German). OCLC 73005338.
- Goldschmidt, Victor Moritz (1931). Zur Kristallchemie des Germaniums (in German). OCLC 73005344.
- Goldschmidt, Victor Moritz (1932). Kristallographie und Stereochemie anorganischer Verbindungen (in German). Berlin, DE: Springer. OCLC 833775446.
- Goldschmidt, Victor Moritz; Peters, Cl. (1932). Zur Geochemie des Berylliums (in German). OCLC 73005333.
- Goldschmidt, Victor Moritz; Peters, Cl. (1932). Zur Geochemie der Edelmetalle (in German). OCLC 73005334.
- Goldschmidt, Victor Moritz (1933). Zur Geochemie des Selens. [1] [1] (in German). Berlin, DE: Weidmann. OCLC 907739289.
- Goldschmidt, Victor Moritz (1933). Zur Geochemie der Alkalimetalle (in German). Vol. 1. Berlin: Weidmann. OCLC 916560558.
- Goldschmidt, Victor Moritz (1934). Zur Geochemie der Alkalimetalle (in German). Vol. 2. Berlin, DE: Weidmann. OCLC 916560558.
- Goldschmidt, Victor Moritz; Peters, Cl. (1934). Zur Geochemie des Arsens, von V.M. Goldschmidt und Cl. Peters (in German). Berlin, DE. OCLC 459427960.
- Goldschmidt, Victor Moritz; Strock, Lester William (1935). Zur Geochemie des Selens. [2] [2] (in German). OCLC 174470162.
- Goldschmidt, Victor Moritz (1938). Die Mengenverhältnisse der Elemente und der Atom-Arten (in German). Oslo: I Kommisjon hos Jacob Dybwad. OCLC 637097688.
- Goldschmidt, V.M.; Muir, Alex (1954). Geochemistry. London, UK: Oxford University Press. ISBN 0-19-851210-4. OCLC 1055939315.

=== Papers ===
- Goldschmidt, V. Moritz (1 December 1908). "XXVIII. Radioactivität als Hilfsmittel bei mineralogischen Untersuchungen. II". Zeitschrift für Kristallographie - Crystalline Materials (in German). 45 (1–6): 490–494. doi:10.1524/zkri.1908.45.1.490. ISSN 2196-7105. S2CID 202508683.
- Goldschmidt, V. M. (26 May 1911). "Die Gesetze der Mineralassoziation vom Standpunkt der Phasenregel". Zeitschrift für anorganische Chemie (in German). 71 (1): 313–322. doi:10.1002/zaac.19110710129. ISSN 0863-1778.
- Goldschmidt, Victor Moritz (1 March 1922). "On the metasomatic processes in silicate rocks". Economic Geology. 17 (2): 105–123. Bibcode:1922EcGeo..17..105G. doi:10.2113/gsecongeo.17.2.105. ISSN 1554-0774.
- Goldschmidt, V.M. (1926). "Die Gesetze der Krystallochemie". Die Naturwissenschaften (in German). 14 (21): 477–485. Bibcode:1926NW.....14..477G. doi:10.1007/BF01507527. ISSN 0028-1042. S2CID 33792511.
- Goldschmidt, V.M. (1 March 1928). "Über Atomabstände in Metallen". Zeitschrift für Physikalische Chemie (in German). 133U (1): 397–419. doi:10.1515/zpch-1928-13327. ISSN 2196-7156. S2CID 100443999.
- Goldschmidt, V.M. (1929). "Crystal structure and chemical constitution". Transactions of the Faraday Society. 25: 253. doi:10.1039/tf9292500253. ISSN 0014-7672.
- Goldschmidt, V.M. (1 November 1930). "Geochemische Verteilungsgesetze und kosmische Häufigkeit der Elemente". Naturwissenschaften (in German). 18 (47): 999–1013. Bibcode:1930NW.....18..999G. doi:10.1007/BF01492200. ISSN 1432-1904. S2CID 44868380.
- Goldschmidt, V. M. (1937). The principles of distribution of chemical elements in minerals and rocks. The seventh Hugo Müller Lecture, delivered before the Chemical Society on March 17th, 1937. J. Chem. Soc. pp. 655–673. doi:10.1039/JR9370000655. ISSN 0368-1769.
- Goldschmidt, V.M. (1945). "The geochemical background of minor-element distribution". Soil Science. 60 (1): 1–8. Bibcode:1945SoilS..60....1G. doi:10.1097/00010694-194507000-00001. ISSN 0038-075X. S2CID 95247254.

== Awards ==
- Goldschmidt was created a Knight of the Order of St. Olav in 1929.
- While at the Macaulay Institute, Goldschmidt was elected a Foreign Member of the Royal Society, given an honorary Doctor of Laws (LLD) by the University of Aberdeen and awarded the Wollaston Medal, the highest honor of the Geological Society of London.
- The mountain ridge Goldschmidtfjella in Oscar II Land at Spitsbergen is named after him.
- The mineral goldschmidtite (KNbO_{3}) was named in his honour (IMA2018-034).
- The V. M. Goldschmidt Medal is awarded annually by The Geochemical Society

== See also ==
- Goldschmidt classification
- Goldschmidt Tolerance Factor
- Lanthanide contraction
