= Coordination sequence =

Count of crystal nodes by distance

In crystallography and graph theory, the coordination sequence of a vertex $v$ is an integer sequence that counts how many vertices are at each possible distance from $v$. That is, it is a sequence
$$n_0, n_1, n_2,\dots$$
where each $n_i$ is the number of vertices that are $i$ steps away from $v$. If the graph is vertex-transitive, then the sequence is an invariant of the graph that does not depend on the specific choice of $v$. Coordination sequences can also be defined for sphere packings, by using either the contact graph of the spheres or the Delaunay triangulation of their centers, but these two choices may give rise to different sequences.

A square grid, shaded by distance from the central blue point. The number of grid points at distance exactly i (for any positive i) is 4i, so the coordination sequence of the grid is the sequence of multiples of four, modified to start with one instead of zero.

As an example, in a square grid, for each positive integer $i$, there are $4i$ grid points that are $i$ steps away from the origin. Therefore, the coordination sequence of the square grid is the sequence
$$1,4,8,12,16,20,\dots\ .$$
in which, except for the initial value of one, each number is a multiple of four.

The concept was proposed by Georg O. Brunner and Fritz Laves and later developed by Michael O'Keefe. The coordination sequences of many low-dimensional lattices and uniform tilings are known.

The coordination sequences of periodic structures are known to be quasi-polynomial.
