= Reinhold Mannkopff =

German physicist (1894–1978)

Reinhold Mannkopff (18 May 1894 – 9 April 1978) was a German experimental physicist who specialized in spectroscopy. In 1939, he was a member of the first Uranium Club, the German nuclear energy project. After World War II, he was the secretary of the Northwest German branch of the German Physical Society for over 20 years.

== Education ==
From 1913 to 1914 and then from 1919 to 1926, Mannkopff studied physics at the Albert-Ludwigs-Universität Freiburg, the Friedrich-Wilhelms-Universität (today, the Humboldt-Universität zu Berlin), and the Georg-August-Universität Göttingen. He received his doctorate under James Franck, in 1926, at the University of Göttingen. His thesis was on the scattering of light in sodium vapor.

== Career ==
From 1926 to 1927, Mannkopff was an assistant to Carl Runge at the University of Göttingen, working with Rowland gratings. From 1927 to 1930, he was a teaching assistant to James Franck there. In 1929, Mannkopff switched to mineralogy, and from 1930 to 1933 he was an assistant to Victor Moritz Goldschmidt at the Mineralogischen Institut of the University of Göttingen. At the institute, he applied his educational background to quantitative applications of spectroscopy to chemical analysis of the Earth’s crust.

In 1934, he became a Privatdozent at the University of Göttingen and in 1939 a nichtplanmäßiger Professor (supernumerary professor) there. In 1939, he also became a member of the short-lived, first Uranverein (Uranium Club), the abortive start of the German nuclear energy project.

Paul Harteck was director of the physical chemistry department at the University of Hamburg and an advisor to the Heereswaffenamt (HWA, Army Ordnance Office). On 24 April 1939, along with his teaching assistant Wilhelm Groth, Harteck made contact with the Reichskriegsministerium (RKM, Reich Ministry of War) to alert them to the potential of military applications of nuclear chain reactions. Two days earlier, on 22 April 1939, after hearing a colloquium paper by Wilhelm Hanle on the use of uranium fission in a Uranmaschine (uranium machine, i.e., nuclear reactor), Georg Joos, along with Hanle, notified Wilhelm Dames, at the Reichserziehungsministerium (REM, Reich Ministry of Education), of potential military applications of nuclear energy. The communication was given to Abraham Esau, head of the physics section of the Reichsforschungsrat (RFR, Reich Research Council) at the REM. On 29 April, a group, organized by Esau, met at the REM to discuss the potential of a sustained nuclear chain reaction. The group included the physicists Walther Bothe, Robert Döpel, Hans Geiger, Wolfgang Gentner (probably sent by Walther Bothe), Wilhelm Hanle, Gerhard Hoffmann, and Georg Joos; Peter Debye was invited, but he did not attend. After this, informal work began at the Georg-August University of Göttingen by Joos, Hanle, and their colleague Reinhold Mannkopff; the group of physicists was known informally as the first Uranverein (Uranium Club) and formally as Arbeitsgemeinschaft für Kernphysik. The group’s work was discontinued in August 1939, when the three were called to military training.

After World War II, Mannkopff was the secretary of the Northwest German branch of the Deutsche Physikalische Gesellschaft (DPG, German Physical Society) for over 20 years.

== Literature by Mannkopff ==
- Reinhold Mannkopff Über die Auslöschung der Resonanzfluoreszenz von Natriumdampf, Zeitschrift für Physik Volume 36, Number 4, 315 – 324 (April, 1926). Received 4 February 1926. Institutional affiliation: II. Physikalisches Institut der Universität, Göttingen. The paper was cited as being an excerpt from the author’s doctoral dissertation.
- C. Runge† and R. Mannkopff Über die Beseitigung des Astigmatismus beim Rowlandschen Konkavgitter, Zeitschrift für Physik Volume 45, Numbers 1-2, 13 – 29 (January, 1927). Received 23 July 1927. Institutional affiliation: II. Physikalisches Institut der Universität, Göttingen.
- Reinhold Mannkopff and Clemens Peters Über quantitative Spektralanalyse mit Hilfe der negativen Glimmschicht im Lichtbogen, Zeitschrift für Physik Volume 70, Numbers 7-8, 444 – 453 (July, 1931). Received 18 May 1931. Institutional affiliation: Mineralogisches Institut der Universität, Göttingen.
- R. Mannkopff Über eine Bauart von Prismenspektrographen mit langer Brennweite, Zeitschrift für Physik Volume 72, Numbers 9-10, 569 – 577 (September, 1931). Received 14 September 1931. Institutional affiliation: Mineralogisches Institut der Universität, Göttingen.
- R. Mannkopff Anregungsvorgänge und Ionenbewegung im Lichtbogen, Zeitschrift für Physik Volume 76, Numbers 5-6, 396 – 406 (May, 1932). Received 18 April 1932. Institutional affiliation: Mineralogisches Institut der Universität, Göttingen.
- R. Mannkopff Über Elektronendichte und Elektronentemperatur in frei brennenden Lichtbögen, Zeitschrift für Physik Volume 86, Numbers 3-4, 161 – 184 (March, 1933). Received 22 August 1933. Institutional affiliation: Mineralogisches Institut der Universität, Göttingen.
- R. K. Dresoher-Kaden, R. Mannkopff, and H. Steinle Über Schmelzversuche an Kohlenstoff, Die Naturwissenschaften Volume 27, Issue 20-21, 370 – 370 (1939)
- R. Mannkopff Die Berechnung der Lichtbogentemperatur und das Stabilitätsproblem der Lichtbogensäule, Zeitschrift für Physik Volume 120, Numbers 3-4, 228 – 251 (March, 1943). Received 19 October 1942. Affiliation: Göttingen.
- R. Mannkopf Über den Energietransport durch Strahlung der Resonanzlinien in Gasen, Zeitschrift für Physik Volume 120, Numbers 5-6, 301 – 317 (May, 1943). Received 25 November 1942. Affiliation: Göttingen.

== Book by Mannkopff ==
- Reinhold Mannkopff Grundlagen und Methoden der chemischen Emissionsspektralanalyse: Eine Einf. mit prakt. Arbeitshinweisen (Verlag Chemie, 1975)

== Bibliography ==
- Hentschel, Klaus (Editor) and Ann M. Hentschel (Editorial Assistant and Translator) Physics and National Socialism: An Anthology of Primary Sources (Birkhäuser, 1996)
- Kant, Horst Werner Heisenberg and the German Uranium Project / Otto Hahn and the Declarations of Mainau and Göttingen, Preprint 203 (Max-Planck Institut für Wissenschaftsgeschichte, 2002)
- Kohler, Max: Nachruf auf Reinhold Mannkopf. In: Physikalische Blätter 34 (1978), S. 436–437
- Macrakis, Kristie Surviving the Swastika: Scientific Research in Nazi Germany (Oxford, 1993)
- Mehra, Jagdish and Helmut Rechenberg The Historical Development of Quantum Theory. Volume 6. The Completion of Quantum Mechanics 1926-1941. Part 2. The Conceptual Completion and Extension of Quantum Mechanics 1932-1941. Epilogue: Aspects of the Further Development of Quantum Theory 1942-1999. (Springer, 2001) ISBN 978-0-387-95086-0
