= Georges Deicha =

French geologist and mineralogist

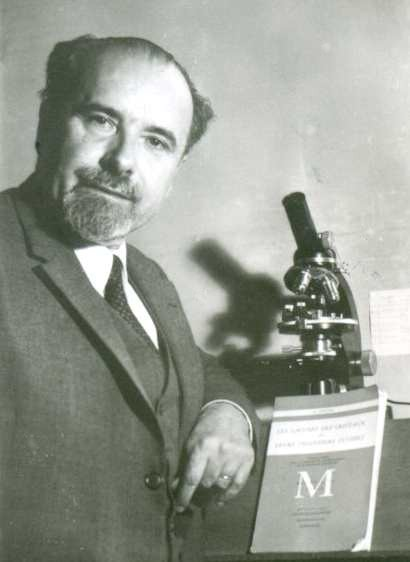
Georges Deicha.

Georges Deicha (1917 – 2011) was a French geologist and mineralogist, known for his pioneering work on fluid inclusions.

Deicha was a student in Paris at the Sorbonne when he started to investigate the crystallization of gypsum in the Paris basin. He wrote his first doctoral thesis on this topic and on the study and interpretation of primary fluid inclusions in minerals and rocks, an area that had until then received little study.

Deicha worked for his scientific career in the CNRS (French National Centre for Scientific Research). He retired with the title "Directeur de recherche de classe exceptionnelle".

== Fluid inclusions ==
In the Laboratory of Applied Geology of Paris, Deicha developed various technical means for detecting, monitoring and analyzing inclusions such as crushing rock under a microscope.

In 1960, at the International Geological Congress in Copenhagen, Deicha founded, together with Edwin W. Roedder (US) and Nikolai P. Ermakov (USSR), the Commission on Ore-Forming Fluids in Inclusions (COFFI). In 1962, he participated in the development of electronic fractography. The term "Deicha's method" became standard, in particular in Russian literature.

== Recognition ==
- Deicha was elected honorary member of several societies of mineralogy and crystallography.
- The centenary of Deicha's birth was commemorated in 2017 in Nancy, France at the biennial convention of European Current Researches on Fluid Inclusions and in various publications

== Artistic activity ==
Deicha, besides his scientific work, was a sculptor, mainly using bas-relief technique. Deicha created medals representing V. Agafonov, P. Milyukov, Leon Bertrand, Ami Boué, Louis Barrabe, Pierre Pruvost, and Raymond Furon. Most of these medals are used as awards by the French Geological Society.

== Bibliography ==
- Complete bibliography up to 1968
- Georges Deicha, Les lacunes des cristaux et leurs inclusions fluides, Paris, Masson, 1955, 126 p.
- Georges Deicha, Aperçu sur les domaines du déséquilibre cristallogénétique, Bull. Muséum, (1947), 2e s.243-248.
- Georges Deicha, "Essais par écrasement de fragments minéraux pour la mise en évidence d’inclusions de gaz sous pression" Bulletin de la Société française de Minéralogie et cristallographie,(1950), LXXII, 439-445.
- Georges Deicha, "Cristallogenèse minérale et cavités des matériaux de la lithosphère", Bulletin de la section des sciences, 7 (1984)
