= European Crystallographic Association =

- Formation: 1997
- Headquarters: Zeist, The Netherlands
- President: Arie van der Lee
- Website: ecanews.org

The European Crystallographic Association (ECA) is an independent scientific organisation, representing both national crystallographic associations in Europe as well as individual members. ECA was founded in 1997. In May 2021 the association had 35 national and several hundred individual members. ECA is one of the regional affiliates of the International Union of Crystallography. The other independent regional affiliates are the American Crystallographic Association, the Asian Crystallographic Association and the Latin American Crystallographic Association. The association is registered under Dutch law in Zeist.

The mission of ECA is the promotion of crystallography in all of its aspects, including the related field of non-crystalline solid state, as well as extending European cooperation in the field of crystallography. These aims are realised through the support of crystallographic conferences, workshops and schools both in Europe and Africa.

== History ==
ECA was founded during the 17th European Crystallographic Meeting (ECM) in Lisbon in 1997 and is the successor of the European Crystallographic Committee (ECC), which existed since 1972 and which organised earlier ECMs. The early history of ECA until ECM 25 in Istanbul has been published by C. Lecomte. The more recent history was summarised during ECM 28 in Warwick/England in 2013.

== Organisation ==
The governing bodies of ECA are the Council and the Executive Committee. The Council devises all ECA policies and each national member is represented by one Councillor. Individual members elect one Councillor for every 100 members. The Executive Committee is responsible for the day-to-day operation in between Council meetings.

Special interest groups (SIGs) and general interest groups (GIGs) offer a platform for scientists sharing similar scientific interests. Both SIGs and GIGs contribute actively to the scientific program of the European Crystallographic Meetings.

== Prizes ==
The European Crystallographic Association administers five awards to recognize achievements in crystallography. The Max Perutz Prize is awarded for significant contributions across all areas of crystallographic research. In partnership with the European Neutron Scattering Association (ENSA), the Erwin Félix Lewy-Bertaut Prize is presented to young scientists for notable work in the study of matter using scattering methods. The George M. Sheldrick Prize acknowledges outstanding scientific contributions by non-tenured researchers within all structural sciences. The Alajos Kálmán Prize, granted in collaboration with the Hungarian Chemical Society, recognizes exceptional scientific contributions to structural sciences over the past 5 to 10 years. The Lodovico Riva di Sanseverino Prize is awarded to individuals for significant contributions to the dissemination of crystallography in education.

=== Awardees ===
- Sine Larsen (2018)
