= Friedrich Liebau =

German chemist and crystallographer (1926–2011)

Friedrich Karl Franz Liebau (May 31, 1926 – 11 March 2011) was a German chemist, crystallographer, and mineralogist known for his research in silicates.

== Education and career ==
Liebau was born on 31 May 1926, in Berlin. He grew up as the son of the upholsterer Otto Liebau and his wife Anna Liebau, née Hecklau, along with two sisters in Berlin. After graduating from high school, he was called up for military service and served in the war from 1944 to 1945. He experienced the end of the war with gunshot wounds in the hospital and thus escaped a longer period of imprisonment in Siberia.

After World War II, Liebau studied chemistry at the Humboldt University of Berlin and later at the German Academy of Sciences at Berlin. He worked the supervision of Erich Thilo and received his diploma in 1951 with the thesis "Über das Na_{2}BeF_{4} und seine Beziehung zum Ca_{2}SiO_{4}", and followed by his doctorate in 1956 with the doctoral thesis "Über die Kristallstrukturen des (NaAsO_{3})_{x}, der Hochtemperaturmodifikation des Maddrellschen Salzes (NaPO_{3})_{x}(l), des β-Wollastonits CaSiO_{3} und einiger strukturell verwandter wasserhaltiger Calciumsilicate.”

In 1960, Liebau fled East Berlin to West Germany. Here he worked as a research assistant at the Max Planck Institute for Silicate Research in Würzburg and habilitated in 1964 at the University of Würzburg with work on the crystal chemistry of silicates. In 1965, Friedrich Liebau became a professor for mineralogy and crystallography at the Christian-Albrechts University in Kiel. There he continued to research the crystal structure of silicates and derived a classification scheme for it. His book "Structural Chemistry of Silicates", published on this subject in 1985, is now the generally accepted textbook on the chemical structure of silicates, which make up most of the rocks on earth. From 1973 to 1974 he was Dean of the Faculty of Mathematics and Natural Sciences. In the 1980s, Liebau worked on the construction and synthesis of clathrates, silicate structures with cavities in which organic or inorganic molecules are embedded, and zeolites, aluminum silicate structures with cavities in which cations are embedded. The latter are used industrially in large quantities, such as in an ion exchanger for water softening.

In 1991, he retired and continued to be active in research. Until his death in Kiel, on 11 March 2011, aged 84, he worked on an extension of the bond valence theory, with which certain material properties, such as high-temperature superconductivity can be described.

== Personal life ==
In 1952, Liebau married Waltrude Martini (later Waltrude Liebau), with whom he had four children: Elisabeth Liebau (born 1953), Martin Liebau (born 1954), Barbara Liebau-Danker (born 1956) and Christine Riewerts (born 1961).

== Honors and awards ==
Liebau received many awards for his research, including the following,

- 1990 Abraham Gottlob Werner Medal of the German Mineralogical Society
- 1995 honorary doctorate from the geoscientific faculty of the University of Würzburg
- 1998 honorary member of the German Crystallographic Society
- 2002 Carl Hermann Medal of the German Crystallographic Society
- 2005 honorary member of the German Mineralogical Society

Liebauite, a mineral discovered in the Eifel in 1992, is named after him.

== Bibliography ==
- Liebau, Friedrich (1985). Structural Chemistry of Silicates : Structure, Bonding, and Classification. Berlin, Heidelberg: Springer Berlin Heidelberg. ISBN 978-3-642-50078-7. OCLC 851819990.
