= Georg Brauer =

German chemist

Georg Karl Brauer (11 April 1908 in Bochum – 26 February 2001 in Freiburg im Breisgau) was a German chemist.

== Life ==
Brauer was the son of the chemist Eberhard Brauer and Elisabeth Brauer, a daughter of Wilhelm Ostwald. From 1926 to 1932, Brauer studied in Leipzig and Freiburg. He received his doctorate under supervision of Eduard Zintl in Freiburg in 1933. In 1941, he received is habilitation at the TH Darmstadt. In 1946, he became an extraordinary professor in Freiburg. From 1959 to 1976, he was a full professor. Starting in 1976, he was a emeritus professor.

== Research ==
Brauer's research included the chemistry and crystal chemistry of intermetallic compounds and alloys. He investigated binary systems of transition metals, in particular of oxides, nitrides, carbides, and hydrides of niobium, tantalum, and vanadium. His research also focused on oxides of rare-earth metals. Many new compounds and several new structure types (Li_{3}N, Li_{3}Bi, Al_{3}Zr, ThSi_{2}, NbO) were discovered during this research.

== Awards ==
In 1971, he received the Lebeau medal.

== Publications ==
Georg Brauer was the editor of the "Handbook of Preparative Inorganic Chemistry".
