= Lieselotte Templeton =

German-born American crystallographer (1918-2009)

Lilo Templeton
- Born: Lieselotte Kamm; 4 August 1918
- Died: 10 October 2009 (aged 91)
- Citizenship: Germany, United States
- Spouse: David H. Templeton (m. 1948)
- Children: 2

Academic background
- Education: University of California, Berkeley
- Thesis: The heats of formation of CN, N2 and NO (1950)
- Doctoral advisor: Leo Brewer

Academic work
- Discipline: Chemist
- Sub-discipline: Physical chemistry; solid-state chemistry; detection of explosives; crystallography
- Institutions: Lawrence Berkeley National Laboratory; University of California, Berkeley

Lieselotte "Lilo" Templeton (née Kamm, 4 August 1918 in Breslau – 10 October 2009 in Berkeley, California) was a German-born American crystallographer. She received the Patterson Award of the American Crystallographic Association together with her husband David H. Templeton in 1987.

== Life ==
Templeton was the daughter of Berta Kamm (née Stern) and Walter Kamm, and the niece of Otto Stern. She grew up in Germany in a secular Jewish family. They fled from Nazi Germany to France in 1933 and emigrated to the US in 1936. She received her bachelor's degree and her PhD from University of California, Berkeley in 1946 and 1950, respectively. Glenn T. Seaborg was part of the committee for the qualifying examination of her PhD. Her PhD thesis, written under the supervision of Leo Brewer, was named: "The heats of formation of CN, N_{2} and NO". She was briefly associated with the Lawrence Berkeley National Laboratory and later worked as a research scientist for the University of California, Berkeley. In 1948, she married David H. Templeton and had two children with him. Due to anti-nepotism rules, she was sometimes not allowed to work in the same department as her husband.

== Research ==
After her PhD, she worked on solid-state chemistry, ceramics, and the detection of explosives. Her research in crystallography started with her work on the analytical absorption program (AGNOST), later called ABSOR. This program helped solving several crystal structures of heavy-element compounds and was also important for her studies on anomalous dispersion with synchrotron radiation on absorption edges which she performed jointly with David H. Templeton. This led to the development of the multi-wavelength anomalous diffraction phasing, now a standard method for protein structure analysis.

Together with David H. Templeton, she also used the polarized nature of synchrotron radiation to show X-ray dichroism in anisotropic molecules and to measure the polarized anomalous scattering in diffraction experiments for the first time.

== Selected publications ==
Three of her most important publications on anamalous dispersion of absorption edges with synchrotron radiation:

- Phillips, J. C.; Templeton, D. H.; Templeton, L. K.; Hodgson, K. O. (1978-07-21). "LIII-Edge Anomalous X-ray Scattering by Cesium Measured with Synchrotron Radiation". Science. 201 (4352): 257–259. Bibcode:1978Sci...201..257P. doi:10.1126/science.201.4352.257. ISSN 0036-8075. PMID 17778657. S2CID 43883153.
- Templeton, Lieselotte K.; Templeton, David H.; Phizackerley, R. Paul (1980). "L3-Edge anomalous scattering of x-rays by praseodymium and samarium". Journal of the American Chemical Society. 102 (3): 1185–1186. doi:10.1021/ja00523a057. ISSN 0002-7863. S2CID 93993099.
- Hodgson, K. O.; Phillips, J. C.; Templeton, L. K.; Templeton, D. H. (1980-05-01). "Anomalous scattering of X-rays by cesium and cobalt measured with synchrotron radiation". Acta Crystallographica Section A. 36 (3): 436–442. Bibcode:1980AcCrA..36..436T. doi:10.1107/S0567739480000940. ISSN 0567-7394.

Two of her publications on X-ray dichroism in anisotropic molecules:

- Templeton, D. H.; Templeton, L. K. (1980-03-01). "Polarized X-ray absorption and double refraction in vanadyl bisacetylacetonate". Acta Crystallographica Section A. 36 (2): 237–241. Bibcode:1980AcCrA..36..237T. doi:10.1107/S0567739480000472. ISSN 0567-7394.
- Templeton, L. K.; Templeton, D. H. (1982-01-01). "X-ray dichroism and polarized anomalous scattering of the uranyl ion". Acta Crystallographica Section A. 38 (1): 62–67. Bibcode:1982AcCrA..38...62T. doi:10.1107/S0567739482000114. ISSN 0567-7394. S2CID 59334396.

== Awards ==
She received the Patterson Award of the American Crystallographic Association jointly with her husband David H. Templeton in 1987 for their discoveries regarding use, measurement, and analysis of anomalous X-ray scattering.

== Lieselotte Templeton Prize for Students ==
The German Society for Crystallography (DGK) awards the Lieselotte Templeton Prize to students who have written an excellent Bachelor's or Master's thesis in the field of crystallography.
