= German Crystallographic Society =

German scientific organization

- Deutsche Gesellschaft für Kristallographie
- Abbreviation: DGK
- Formation: March 12, 1991; 35 years ago
- Purpose: Promotion of crystallographic science and research
- Members: 1059
- Leader: Ute Kolb
- Website: www.dgk-home.de

The German Crystallographic Society (Deutsche Gesellschaft für Kristallographie, or DGK in German) is a non-profit organization based in Berlin. As a voluntary association of scientists working in crystallography or interested in crystallography and other people and institutions, its goal is to promote crystallography in teaching, research and industrial practice as well as in the public, in particular by fostering the exchange of experience and ideas as well as further education at national and international level Frame. Working groups are dedicated to specific areas of crystallography. The Society has just over 1000 members.

== Activities ==
The DGK represents crystallography in national and international scientific institutions. In particular, the DGK is a member body of the International Union of Crystallography (IUCr) and the European Crystallographic Association (ECA). The DGK nominates candidates for the crystallographically relevant review boards of the German Research Foundation. The association holds an annual conference every year, usually in spring.

The DGK issues a publication, the "Notifications", which is sent to the members annually.

Special scientific achievements are recognized with prizes, which are usually awarded annually. The DGK awards the following prizes: The Carl Hermann Medal for the scientific life's work of outstanding researchers in the field of crystallography and the Max von Laue Prize for young scientists. Furthermore, outstanding scientific contributions are honored with the Will Kleber commemorative coin. The Waltrude and Friedrich Liebau Prize for promoting interdisciplinary crystallography is awarded by the DGK on behalf of the Waltrude and Friedrich Liebau Foundation. In addition, from 2022 the Lieselotte Templeton Prize is awarded for very good bachelor's, master's or similar theses in the field of crystallography.

The DGK has provisionally applied to host the IUCr conference in Berlin in 2029 and was represented with its own stand at the corresponding conference in Prague in 2021. The IUCr conference was last represented in Germany in 1984, in Hamburg.

In a blog on the DGK homepage, articles are written at irregular intervals with topics such as "studying during the corona pandemic", depositing crystal structure data sets in the ICSD database, reports on people or on past conferences.

== History ==
The association was founded on March 12, 1991 in Munich by merging the scientific associations "Crystallography Working Group" (AGKr) and "Association for Crystallography" (VFK). The merger of the West German AGKr led by Wolfram Saenger with the VFK of the GDR led by Ursula Steinike (Berlin) was decided by a vote of the members of these societies. The first elected chairman of the German Crystallographic Society was Heinz Schulz.

President since inception:

| Period | President |
|---|---|
| 1991–1994 | Heinz Hermann Schulz |
| 1994–1997 | Hans Burzlaff |
| 1997–2000 | Gernot Heger |
| 2000–2003 | Peter Paufler |
| 2003–2006 | Wulf Depmeier |
| 2006–2009 | Wolfgang Neumann |
| 2009–2012 | Udo Heinemann |
| 2012–2015 | Wolfgang Schmahl |
| 2015–2018 | Susan Schorr |
| 2018–2021 | Ralf Ficner |
| 2021–2024 | Thomas Schleid |
| 2024–2027 | Ute Kolb |

The annual meeting of the DGK takes place at a different location (usually in Germany) every year. In 2020 the conference was organized together with the Polish Crystallographic Association in Wroclaw. In 2021 the conference was supposed to take place in Hamburg at DESY and in 2022 in Munich, but due to the corona pandemic they were held online.

== See also ==
- British Crystallographic Association
- American Crystallographic Association
- European Crystallographic Association
- International Union of Crystallography
