= Government agencies in Norway =

The government agencies of Norway are state-controlled organizations that act independently to carry out the policies of the Government of Norway. The government ministries are relatively small and merely policy-making organizations, allowed to control agencies by policy decisions but not by direct orders. A minister is explicitly prohibited from interfering with the day-to-day operation in an agency or the outcome in individual cases. While no minister is allowed to give orders to agencies personally, they are subject to decisions made by the government. Also, the minister is normally the instance of appeals for agency decisions.

Agencies are organised as etater. Still, some of the work of the government is carried out through state enterprises or limited companies. For a full list of enterprises and companies, see List of Norwegian government enterprises.

== Storting ==
- Office of the Auditor General of Norway (Riksrevisjonen): auditor of all state accounts
- Norwegian Parliamentary Ombudsman for Public Administration (Sivilombudsmannen): ombudsman for all civil matters

== Ministry of Agriculture and Food ==
=== Agencies ===
- Norwegian Agricultural Agency (Landbruksdirektoratet): manages agriculture, forestry, and reindeer herding
- Norwegian Food Safety Authority (Mattilsynet): controls all aspects of food safety, including agriculture, import and trade

=== Enterprises ===
- Statskog: manages state-owned forests and natural property

=== Limited companies ===
- Staur Farm (Staur Gård): a farm

== Ministry of Children and Families ==
- Allocation Committee for support to voluntary children's and youth organizations (Fordelingsutvalget for tilskudd til frivilligebarne- og ungdomsorganisasjoner): issues grants for children and youth organizations
- County social welfare boards (Fylkesnemndene for sosiale saker): makes decisions of placement of children in institutions and foster homes
- Ecolabelling Norway (Stiftelsen miljømerking): awards ecolabelling
- County Governor (Fylkesmannen): regional authority, with a governor in each of 18 counties
- Market Council of Norway (Markedsrådet): makes legal decisions concerning consumer rights upon specific or general cases
- National Institute for Consumer Research (Statens institutt for forbruksforskning): research
- Norway's Contact Committee for Immigrants and the Authorities (Kontaktutvalget mellom innvandrerbefolkningen og myndighetene): dialog between immigrants and authorities
- Norwegian Assay Office (Edelmetallkontrollen): control of trade of noble metals
- Norwegian Consumer Council (Forbrukerrådet): pursues consumer interests
- Norwegian Consumer Dispute Commission (Forbrukertvistutvalget): settles consumer matters
- Norwegian Consumer Ombudsman (Forbrukerombudet): handles complaints from consumers
- Norwegian Directorate for Children, Youth and Family Affairs (Barne-, ungdoms- og familieetaten): helps children, youth and families who need help
- Norwegian Equality and Anti-Discrimination Ombud (Likestillings- og diskrimineringsombudet): fights discrimination
- Norwegian Equality and Anti-Discrimination Tribunal (Likestillings- og diskrimineringsnemnda): appeal board for the Equality and Anti-Discrimination Ombud
- Norwegian Labour and Welfare Service (Arbeids- og velferdsdirektoratet): administrating age- and disability pensions and other welfare, and manages unemployment
- Ombudsman for Children in Norway (Barneombudet): promotes children's interests in society

== Ministry of Culture and Church Affairs ==
=== Agencies ===
- Arts Council Norway (Norsk Kulturråd): issues grants to culture, and functions as an advisory board for the ministry in culture affairs
- Bunad- og folkedraktrådet: advises on and promotes the use of bunad, the Norwegian national costume
- Det praktisk-teologiske seminar: educates ministers of the Church of Norway
- Church of Norway National Council (Kirkerådet): head body of the Church of Norway
- Museum of Archaeology, Stavanger (Arkeologisk museum i Stavanger): archeology and museum
- National Archives of Norway (Nasjonalarkivet): national and regional state archives
- National Foundation for Art in Public Buildings (Utsmykkingsfondet for offentlige bygg): competence centre and producer of art for public buildings
- National Library of Norway (Nasjonalbiblioteket): national library
- Nidaros Domkirkes Restaureringsarbeider: preservation work on the Nidaros Cathedral and the Archbishop's Palace
- Norwegian Library of Talking Books and Braille (Norsk lyd- og blindeskriftbibliotek): publisher and library for audio books
- Norwegian Archive, Library and Museum Authority (ABM-utvikling): authority for archives, libraries and museums
- Norwegian Film Institute (Norsk filminstitutt): preserves, supports and distributes Norwegian and foreign films
- Norwegian Gaming and Foundation Authority (Lotteri- og stiftelsestilsynet): supervises gaming, lotteries and foundations
- Norwegian Institute of Local History (Norsk lokalhistorisk institutt): promotes local history knowledge
- Norwegian Language Council (Språkrådet): regulates the official version of the Norwegian language
- Norwegian Media Authority (Medietilsynet): regulates all aspects of mass media, including content rating, ownership, concessions and advertising
- Opplysningsvesenets fond: manages the real estate of the Church of Norway, except the actual church buildings
- Concerts Norway (Rikskonsertene): mobile music performance that performs throughout the country
- Riksteatret: mobile theatre that performs throughout the country

=== Diocesan Councils ===
- Agder og Telemark Diocesan Council (Agder og Telemark bispedømmeråd)
- Bjørgvin Diocesan Council (Bjørgvin bispedømmeråd)
- Borg Diocesan Council (Borg bispedømmeråd)
- Hamar Diocesan Council (Hamar bispedømmeråd)
- Møre Diocesan Council (Møre bispedømmeråd)
- Nidaros Diocesan Council (Nidaros bispedømmeråd)
- Nord-Hålogaland Diocesan Council (Nord-Hålogaland bispedømmeråd)
- Oslo Bishop and Diocesan Council (Oslo biskop og bispedømmerådråd)
- Stavanger Diocesan Council (Stavanger bispedømmeråd)
- Sør-Hålogaland Diocesan Council (Sør-Hålogaland bispedømmeråd)
- Tunsberg Diocesan Council (Tunsberg bispedømmeråd)

=== Limited companies ===
- National Theatre of Norway (Nationaltheatret): theatre in Oslo
- Norsk Tipping: holds a monopoly on all gambling
- Norwegian Broadcasting Corporation (Norsk rikskringkasting): public broadcaster of radio and television channels

== Ministry of Defence ==
- National Security Authority (Nasjonal sikkerhetsmyndighet)
- Norwegian Defence Estates Agency (Forsvarsbygg)
- Norwegian Defence Research Establishment (Forsvarets forskningsinstitutt)

== Norwegian Ministry of Education and Research ==
=== Agencies ===
- Foreldreutvalget for barnehager: cooperation between parents of daycare-aged children and daycare authorities
- Foreldreutvalget for grunnopplæringen: cooperation between parents of primary school-aged children and school authorities
- Norway Opening Universities (Norgesuniversitetet): promotes cooperation between business and higher education, and aims to increase lifelong learning
- Norwegian Agency for Quality Assurance in Education (Nasjonalt organ for kvalitet i utdanningen): supervises and works to improve the quality of higher education
- Norwegian Centre for International Cooperation in Higher Education (Senter for internasjonalisering av høyere utdanning): promotes international cooperation in higher education and research
- Norwegian Directorate for Education and Training (Utdanningsdirektoratetet): responsible for the development of primary and secondary education
- Norwegian Institute for Adult Learning (VOX-læring for arbeidslivet: promotes adult learning in reading, writing, arithmetic and ICT
- Norwegian Institute of International Affairs (Norsk utenrikspolitisk institutt): research
- Norwegian Meteorological Institute (Meteorologisk institutt): performs weather observations and calculations
- Norwegian Social Research (Norsk institutt for forskning om oppvekst, velferd og aldring): research
- Norwegian State Educational Loan Fund (Statens lånekasse for utdanning): grants loans and scholarships to students
- Norwegian Universities and Colleges Admission Service (Samordna opptak): coordinates admission to undergraduate courses at state universities and colleges
- The Research Council of Norway (Norges forskningsråd): grants funds for research
- Statens fagskole for gartnere og blomsterdekoratører: educates gardeners and flower decorators at secondary school level.

=== Universities ===
- Norwegian University of Life Sciences (Universitetet for miljø- og biovitenskap)
- Norwegian University of Science and Technology (Norges teknisk-naturvitenskapelige universitet)
- University of Agder (Universitetet i Agder)
- University of Bergen (Universitetet i Bergen)
- University of Oslo (Universitetet i Oslo)
- University of Stavanger (Universitetet i Stavanger)
- University of Tromsø (Universitetet i Tromsø)

=== Specialised colleges ===
- Oslo School of Architecture and Design (Arkitektur- og designhøgskolen i Oslo)
- Norwegian School of Economics and Business Administration (Norges handelshøgskole)
- Norwegian School of Sport Sciences (Norges idrettshøgskole)
- Norwegian Academy of Music (Norges musikkhøgskole)
- Norwegian School of Veterinary Science (Norges veterinærhøgskole)

=== Regional university colleges ===
- Akershus University College (Høgskolen i Akershus)
- Bergen National Academy of the Arts (Kunsthøgskolen i Bergen)
- Bergen University College (Høgskolen i Bergen)
- Bodø University College (Høgskolen i Bodø)
- Buskerud University College (Høgskolen i Buskerud)
- Finnmark University College (Høgskolen i Finnmark)
- Gjøvik University College (Høgskolen i Gjøvik)
- Harstad University College (Høgskolen i Harstad)
- Hedmark University College (Høgskolen i Hedmark)
- Lillehammer University College (Høgskolen i Lillehammer)
- Molde University College (Høgskolen i Molde)
- Narvik University College (Høgskolen i Narvik)
- Nesna University College (Høgskolen i Nesna)
- Nord-Trøndelag University College (Høgskolen i Nord-Trøndelag)
- Oslo National Academy of the Arts (Kunsthøgskolen i Oslo)
- Oslo University College (Høgskolen i Oslo)
- Sámi University College (Samisk høgskole)
- Sogn og Fjordane University College (Høgskolen i Sogn of Fjordane)
- Stord/Haugesund University College (Høgskolen i Stord/Haugesund)
- Sør-Trøndelag University College (Høgskolen i Sør-Trøndelag)
- Telemark University College (Høgskolen i Telemark)
- Tromsø University College (Høgskolen i Tromsø)
- Vestfold University College (Høgskolen i Vestfold)
- Volda University College (Høgskolen i Volda)
- Østfold University College (Høgskolen i Østfold)
- Ålesund University College (Høgskolen i Ålesund)

=== Limited companies ===
- Norwegian Social Science Data Services (Norsk samfunnsvitenskapelig datatjeneste): information and data services for higher education and research
- University Centre in Svalbard (Universitetssenteret på Svalbard): research on Svalbard
- UNINETT: operates the university/college/research internet communication network and the Norid domain register

== Ministry of Climate and Environment ==
- Norwegian Environment Agency (Miljødirektoratet): agency with main responsibilities connected to
- Norwegian Directorate for Cultural Heritage (Riksantikvaren): authority that authorises preservation of cultural heritage
- Norwegian Polar Institute (Norsk Polarinstitutt): conducts research related to Arctic sciences
- Norwegian Mapping Authority (Statens kartverk): manages maps of the entire country
- Norwegian Product Register (Produktregisteret): maintains a database over the content of all products distributed in the country

== Ministry of Finance ==
- Pension Fund Global (Statens pensjonsfond – utland): invests axcess capital abroad
- National Insurance Scheme Fund (Folketrygdfondet): invests domestic pensions
- Norges Bank: central bank
- Norwegian Customs and Excise Authorities (Tollvesenet): collects customs
- Norwegian Financial Supervisory Authority (Finanstilsynet): controls banks and other financial institutions
- Norwegian Government Agency for Financial Management (Senter for statlig økonomistyring): coordinates financial management within the Government
- Norwegian National Collection Agency (Statens innkrevingssentral): collects dues payable to the state
- Norwegian Tax Administration (Skatteetaten): manages and collects taxes
- Statistics Norway (Statistisk sentralbyrå): statistics collection, computing and publishing agency

== Ministry of Fisheries and Coastal Affairs ==
=== Agencies ===
- Institute of Marine Research (Havforskningsinstituttet): research related to marine biology and fish management
- Norwegian Coastal Administration (Kystverket): owns and operates water transportation infrastructure, including harbours, piloting and navigation
- National Institute of Nutrition and Seafood Research (Nasjonalt institutt for ernærings- og sjømatforskning): research related to nutrition and seafood
- Norwegian Directorate of Fisheries (Fiskeridirektoratet): authority concerning matters of fisheries

=== Limited companies ===
- Norwegian Seafood Export Council (Eksportrådet for fisk): marketing of fish abroad
- Secora: construction company for water transport infrastructure

== Ministry of Foreign Affairs ==
- Fredskorpset: exchange organisation to promote understanding between countries
- Norfund: capital investment in developing countries
- Norwegian Agency for Development Cooperation (Norad): aid to developing countries

== Ministry of Government Administration and Reform ==
- Agency for Public Management and eGovernment (Direktoratet for forvaltning og informasjons- og kommunikasjonsteknologi): management consulting, electronic commerce management and operation og government websites
- County Governor (Fylkesmannen): regional authority of the Government, with a Governor in each of 18 counties
- Government Administration Services (Departementenes servicesenter): provides administrative services for the ministries
- Norwegian Competition Authority (Konkuransetilsynet): regulates permission to merge, and regulates to stimulate competition
- Norwegian Data Inspectorate (Datatilsynet): regulates permission to store information on persons or other entities
- Norwegian Directorate of Public Construction and Property (Statsbygg): builds, manages and operates all government buildings
- Norwegian Public Service Pension Fund (Statens pensjonsfond): fund allocating extra pensions for civil servants
- Personvernnemda: ombudsman concerning matters of privacy

== Ministry of Health and Care Services ==
=== Agencies ===
- Norwegian Directorate for Health and Social Affairs (Helse- og sosialdirektoratet): central expertise in administering healthcare and social affairs
- Norwegian Board of Health Supervision (Statens helsetilsyn): highest supervision authority for the health and social services
- Norwegian Institute of Public Health (Nasjonalt folkehelseinstitutt): preventative health work
- Norwegian System of Compensation to Patients (Norsk pasientskadeerstatning): can issue compensation for medical malpractice
- Norwegian Patients' Injury Compensation Board (Pasientskadenemnda): appeal board for the System of Compensation to Patients
- Norwegian Biotechnology Advisory Board (Bioteknologirådet): a board that advises the authorities in matters concerning modern biotechnology
- Norwegian Appeals Board for Health Personnel (Statens helsepersonellnemnd): appeal board for health personnel who lose authorization
- Norwegian Medicines Agency (Statens legemiddelverk): controls research, production and sale of medicine
- National Institute for Alcohol and Drug Research (Statens institutt for rusmiddelforskning): research connected to alcohol and drug use
- Norwegian Scientific Committee for Food Safety (Vitenskapskomiteen for mattrygghet)
- Norwegian Radiation Protection Authority (Statens strålevern): expertise and precautions against nuclear and radiation threats
- Norwegian Labour and Welfare Service (Arbeids- og velferdsdirektoratet): administers age- and disability pensions and other welfare, and manages unemployment
- Norwegian Food Safety Authority (Mattilsynet): controls all aspects of food safety, including agriculture, import and trade
- Norwegian Governmental Appeal Board regarding medical treatment abroad (Dispensasjons- og klagenemnda for behandling i utlandet): appeal board for patients who need treatment abroad, and where there is not adequate domestic service, who are entitled to have treatment paid for by the authorities

=== Regional health authorities ===
The regional health authorities (regional helseforetak) are responsible for providing specialist healthcare services within their designated geographic area.

- Central Norway Regional Health Authority (Helse Midt-Norge)
- Northern Norway Regional Health Authority (Helse Nord)
- Southern and Eastern Norway Regional Health Authority (Helse Sør-Øst)
- Western Norway Regional Health Authority (Helse Vest)

=== Limited companies ===
- Vinmonopolet: monopoly on trade of wine and spirits

== Ministry of Justice and the Police ==
=== Agencies ===
- Governor of Svalbard (Sysselmannen på Svalbard)
- Joint Rescue Coordination Centre of Northern Norway (Hovedredningssentralen i Nord-Norge): coordinates rescue operations
- Joint Rescue Coordination Centre of Southern Norway (Hovedredningssentralen i Sør-Norge): coordinates rescue operations
- Justissekretariatene: manages a number of administrative functions related to legal processes
- National Police Directorate (Politidirektoratet): the police force
- National Security Authority (Nasjonal sikkerhetsmyndighet)
- Norwegian Advisory Council on Bankruptcy (Konkursrådet): administers bankruptcies
- Norwegian Border Commissioner (Grensekommisær for den norsk-russiske grense): controls the border between Norway and Russia
- Norwegian Civil Defence (Sivilforsvaret): civil defence; emergency and rescue services in the event of major accidents and incidents
- Norwegian Correctional Services (Kriminalomsorgen): operates criminal correctional services, including prisons
- Norwegian Criminal Injuries Compensation Authority (Kontoret for voldsoffererstatning): manages compensation for victims of criminal injuries
- Norwegian Directorate for Civil Protection and Emergency Planning (Direktoratet for samfunnssikkerhet og beredskap): maintains an overview of and works to prevent societal threats
- Norwegian Directorate for Emergency Communication (Direktoratet for nødkommunikasjon): builds and operates the emergency communication network
- Norwegian Judge Advocate General (Generaladvokatembetet): head prosecutor of the military court
- Norwegian Mediation and Reconciliation Service (Konfliktrådet): settles disputes
- Norwegian Police Security Service (Politiets sikkerhetstjeneste): surveillance of domestic threats to national security
- Norwegian Police University College (Politihøyskolen): police officer college
- Samerettsutvalget: research related to the Sami
- Norwegian Bureau for the Investigation of Police Affairs (Spesialenheten for politisaker): investigates accusations of criminal offences by police or prosecution officers on duty

=== Limited companies ===
- Norsk Eiendomsinformasjon: land registry company which provides land information to the professional market

== Ministry of Local Government and Regional Development ==
- Norwegian State Housing Bank (Husbanken): issues loans for housing
- National Office of Building Technology and Administration (Statens bygningstekniske etat): expertise within building technology

== Ministry of Petroleum and Energy ==
=== Agencies ===
- Gassnova: research related to CO_{2} capture and deposit
- Norwegian Petroleum Directorate (Oljedirektoratet): manages the petroleum resources on the Norwegian continental shelf
- Norwegian Water Resources and Energy Directorate (Norges vassdrag og energidirektorat): authority controlling and regulating water resources like rivers and lakes, and the production of energy

=== Enterprises ===
- Enova: manages subsidies and encourages energy conservation
- Statnett: owns and operates the central power grid

=== Limited companies ===
- Gassco: operates all natural gas pipe lines in the country
- Petoro: manages the state's direct financial interest in the petroleum industry

== Ministry of Labour and Social Inclusion ==
=== Agencies ===
- International Centre for Reindeer Husbandry (Internasjonalt fag- og formidlingssenter for reindrift): research
- Labour Court of Norway (Arbeidsretten): court that takes under consideration disputes about validity, interpretation and existence of collective agreements, questions regarding breach of collective agreements, questions regarding breach of the peace obligation, and claims for damages resulting from such breaches
- Directorate of Integration and Diversity (Integrerings- og mangfoldhetsdirektoratet): authority concerning integration of foreigners
- National Centre for Documentation on Disability (Nasjonal dokumentasjonssenter for personer med nedsatt funksjonsevne): research
- National Institute of Occupational Health (Statens arbeidsmiljøinstitutt): research
- Norwegian Directorate for Health and Social Affairs (Sosial- og helsedirektoratet): competence centre for the management of healthcare and social affairs
- Norwegian Directorate of Immigration (Utlendingsdirektoratet): immigration permits and authority
- Norwegian Directorate of Labour and Welfare (Arbeids- og velferdsdirektoratet): manages the Norwegian Labour and Welfare Service
- Norwegian Immigration Appeals Board (Utlendingsnemda): appeal board for the Directorate of Immigration
- Norwegian Labour and Welfare Service (Arbeids- og velferdsetaten): administers age- and disability pensions and other welfare, and manages unemployment
- Norwegian Labour Inspection Authority (Arbeidstilsynet): occupational health and safety authority
- Norwegian Pension Insurance for Seamen (Pensjonstrygden for sjømenn): administrates the seamen's pension
- Petroleum Safety Authority Norway (Petroleumstilsynet): ensures occupational safety and health in the petroleum industry
- Resource Centre for the Rights of Indigenous Peoples, or Kompetansesenter for urfolks rettigheter): research
- Resource Centre for Nature and Reindeer Husbandry Services (Ressurssenter for natur og reindriftstjenester): research
- State Conciliator of Norway (Riksmeklingsmannen): negotiates wage and traffic disputes between employer and labour unions
- Sámediggi (Sametinget): Sami parliament

=== Limited companies ===
- Rehabil: rehabilitation workplace

== Ministry of Trade and Industry ==
=== Agencies ===
- Brønnøysund Register Centre (Brønnøysundregistrene): manages the vast amounts of registers related to business, commerce and civil matters
- Guarantee Institute for Export Credits (Garanti-instituttet for eksportkreditt): grants guarantees for export companies
- Norwegian Accreditation (Norsk Akkreditering): ensures that research laboratories meet international regulations
- Norwegian Directorate of Mining with the Commissioner of Mines at Svalbard (Bergvesenet med bergmesteren for Svalbard): registers mining claims, and regulates other concerns regarding mining, including environmental issues and mining on Svalbard
- Norwegian Maritime Directorate (Sjøfartsdirektoratet): ensures and encourages sea and water transport safety
- Norwegian Metrology Service (Justervesenet): in charge of research and measuring of metrology; ensures through control that all meters are correct
- Norwegian Geological Survey (Norges geologiske undersøkelser): research and survey related to geology
- Norwegian Industrial Property Office (Patentstyret): registers patents
- Norwegian Ship Registers (Skipsregistrene): registry for the Norwegian Ship Register and the Norwegian International Ship Register
- Norwegian Space Centre (Norsk Romsenter): space agency

=== Limited companies ===
- Argentum Fondsinvesteringer: private equity fund
- Bjørnøen: owns all land on the island Bjørnøya
- Electronic Chart Centre: makes electronic maritime charts
- Entra Eiendom: manages the commercial portfolio of government real estate
- Flytoget: operates the Airport Express Train between Oslo and Oslo Airport, Gardermoen
- Innovation Norway (Innovasjon Norge): provides help and funding for start-up companies
- Kings Bay: operates research facility at Ny-Ålesund on Svalbard
- Mesta: provides public tender road work construction work
- Industrial Development Corporation of Norway (SIVA): invests in business and industry park, incubators and other industrial and technology entrepreneur infrastructure
- Statkraft: power company which also owns a number of local power companies
- Venturefondet: investment fund
- Store Norske Spitsbergen Kulkompani: operates the coal mine at Longyearbyen and Svea on Svalbard

== Ministry of Transport and Communications ==
=== Agencies ===
- National Rail Administration (Jernbaneverket): owns and operates the railway infrastructure
- Norwegian Accident Investigation Board (Statens havarikommisjon for transport): investigates accidents related to air-, water-, road- or rail transport
- Norwegian Civil Aviation Authority (Luftfartstilsynet): inspectorate and authority concerning air transport
- Norwegian Post and Telecommunications Authority (Post- og teletilsynet): regulates the telecom industry, issues telephone numbers
- Norwegian Railway Inspectorate (Jernbanetilsynet): inspectorate concerning rail transport, including urban rail
- Norwegian Public Roads Administration (Statens Vegvesen): builds, operates and maintains state and county road infrastructure

=== Limited companies ===
- Avinor: airport and air traffic management operator
- Baneservice: construction company for railway infrastructure
- Posten Norge: postal service
- Vy: railway operation

== See also ==
- Politics of Norway
- List of government enterprises of Norway
- Government agencies in Iceland
- Government agencies in Sweden
