= List of government enterprises of Norway =

This is a list of Norwegian government owned companies. In addition to this the government of Norway owns publicly traded stock domestically through Folketrygdfondet and internationally through The Government Pension Fund of Norway. The list is as of 2005.

== Wholly owned ==
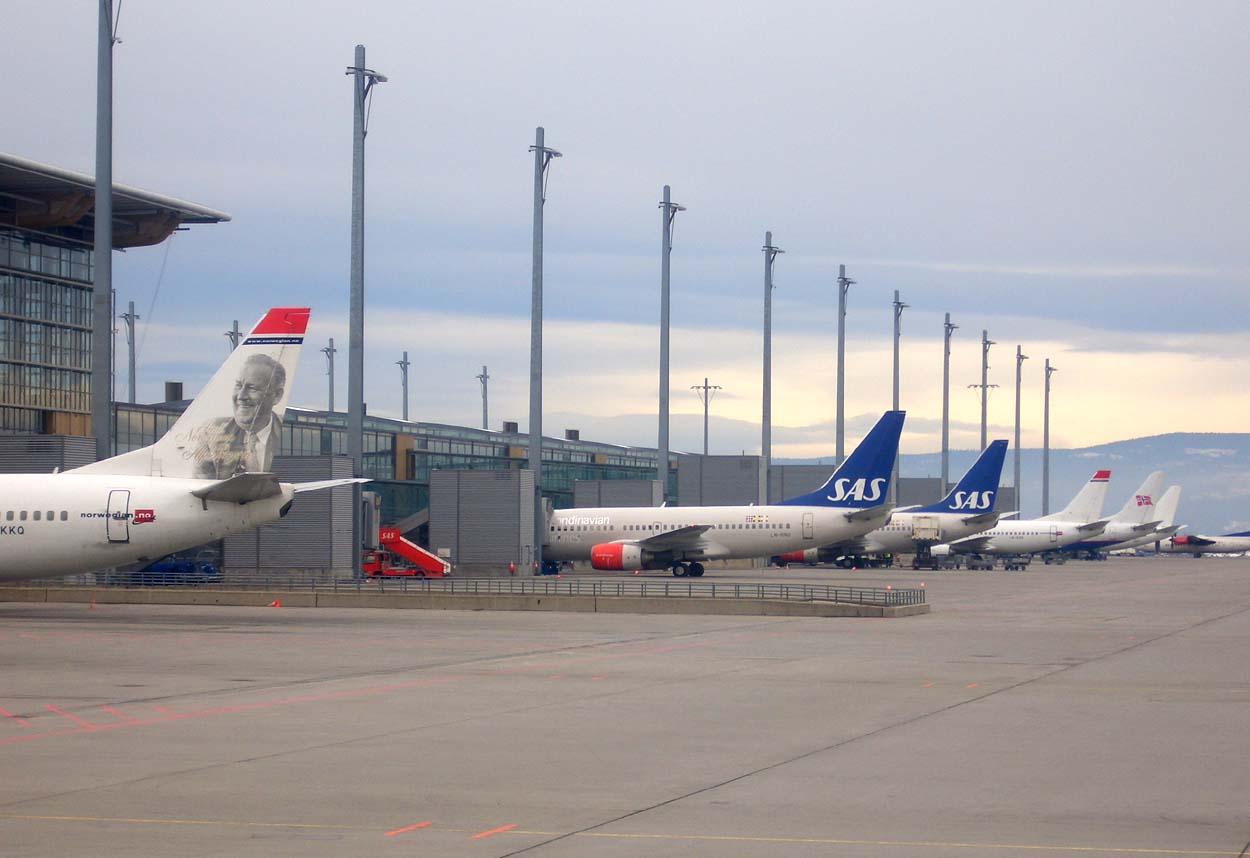
Avinor operates Oslo Airport, Gardermoen and 45 other airports; in the middle two Scandinavian Airlines aircraft—an airline that is partially government owned.

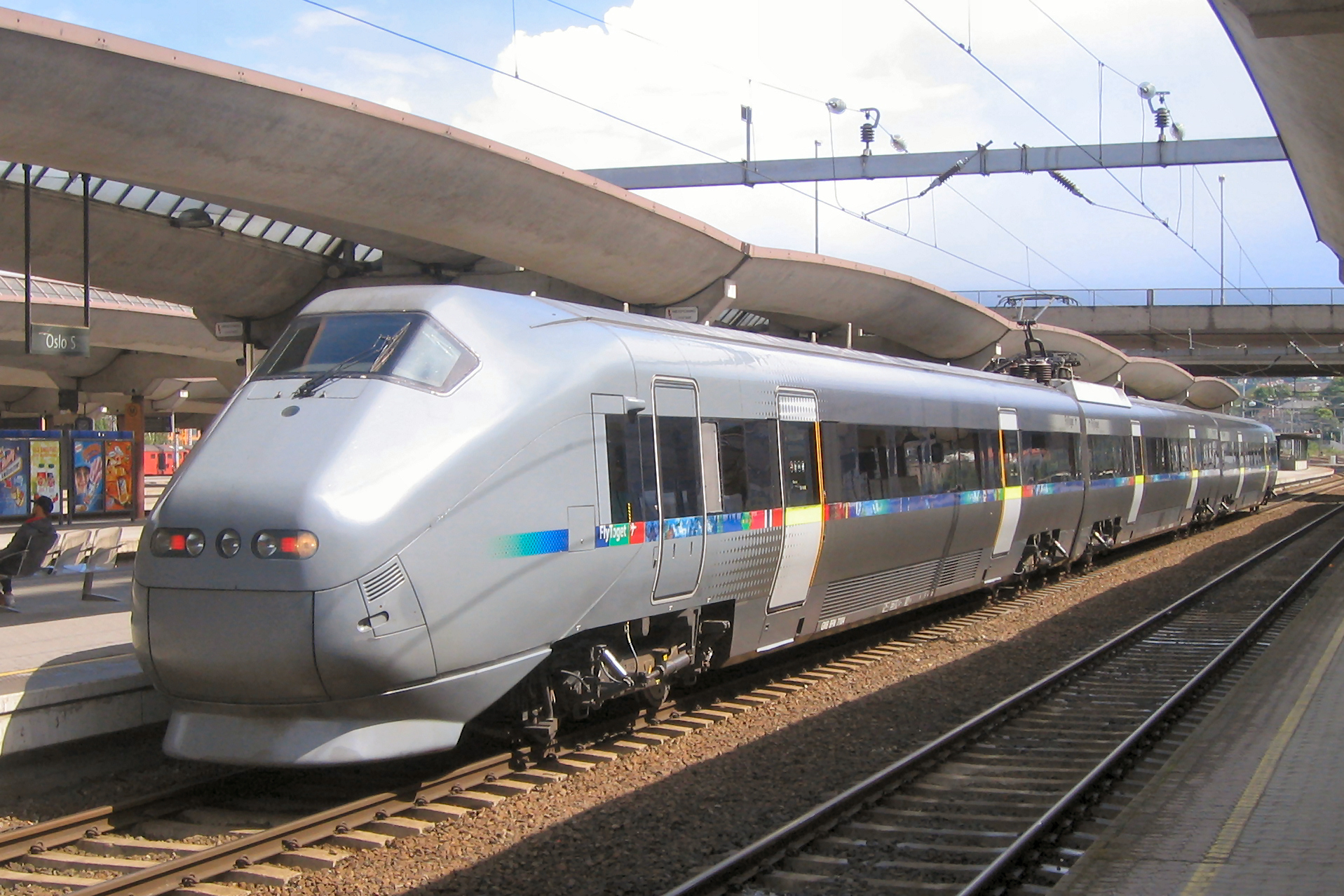
Flytoget operates the Airport Express Train

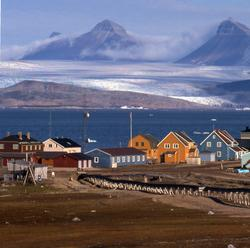
Kings Bay owns the whole village of Ny-Ålesund, Svalbard, where it provides research facilities

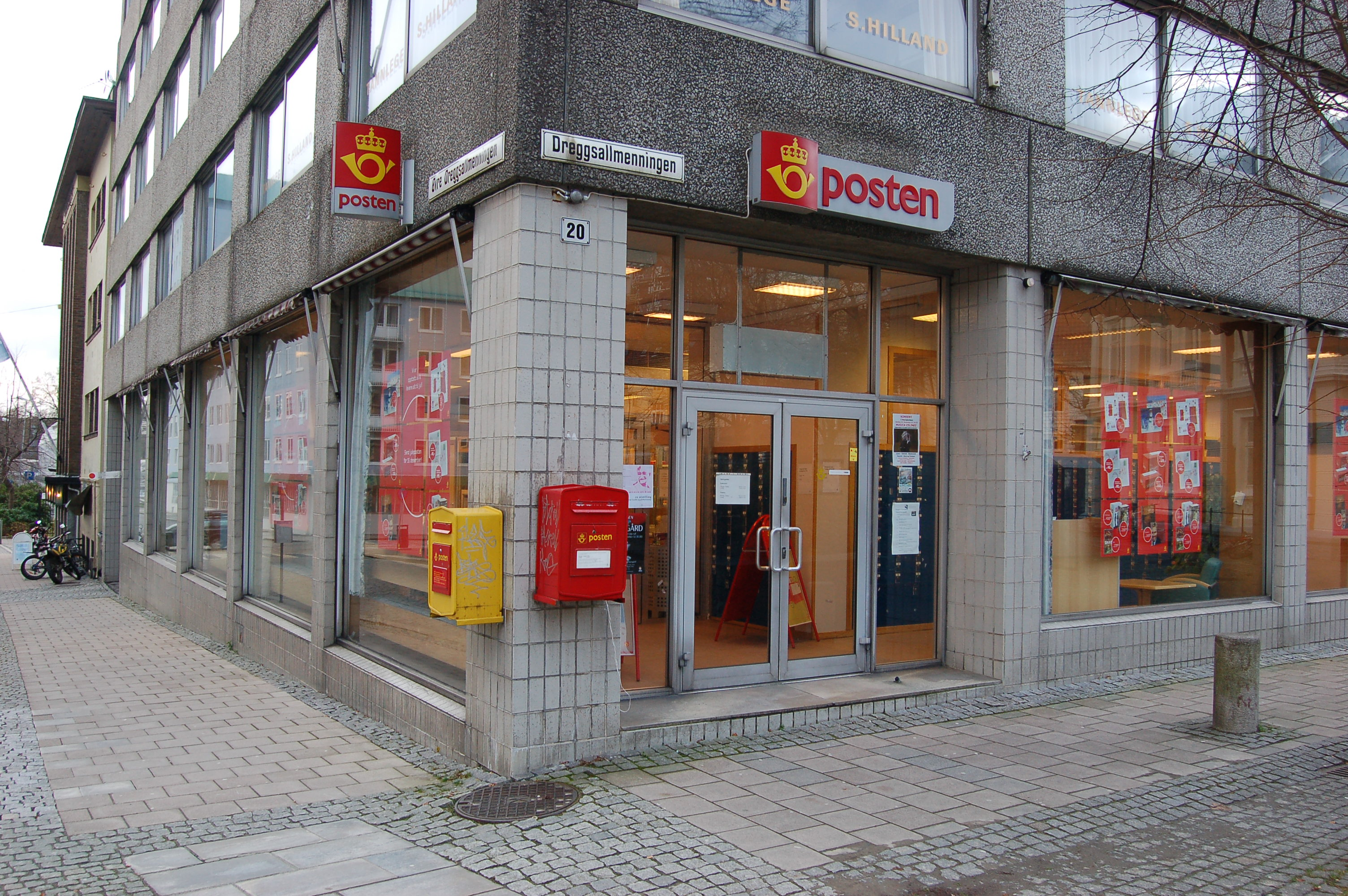
A post office in Bergen belonging to Posten Norge

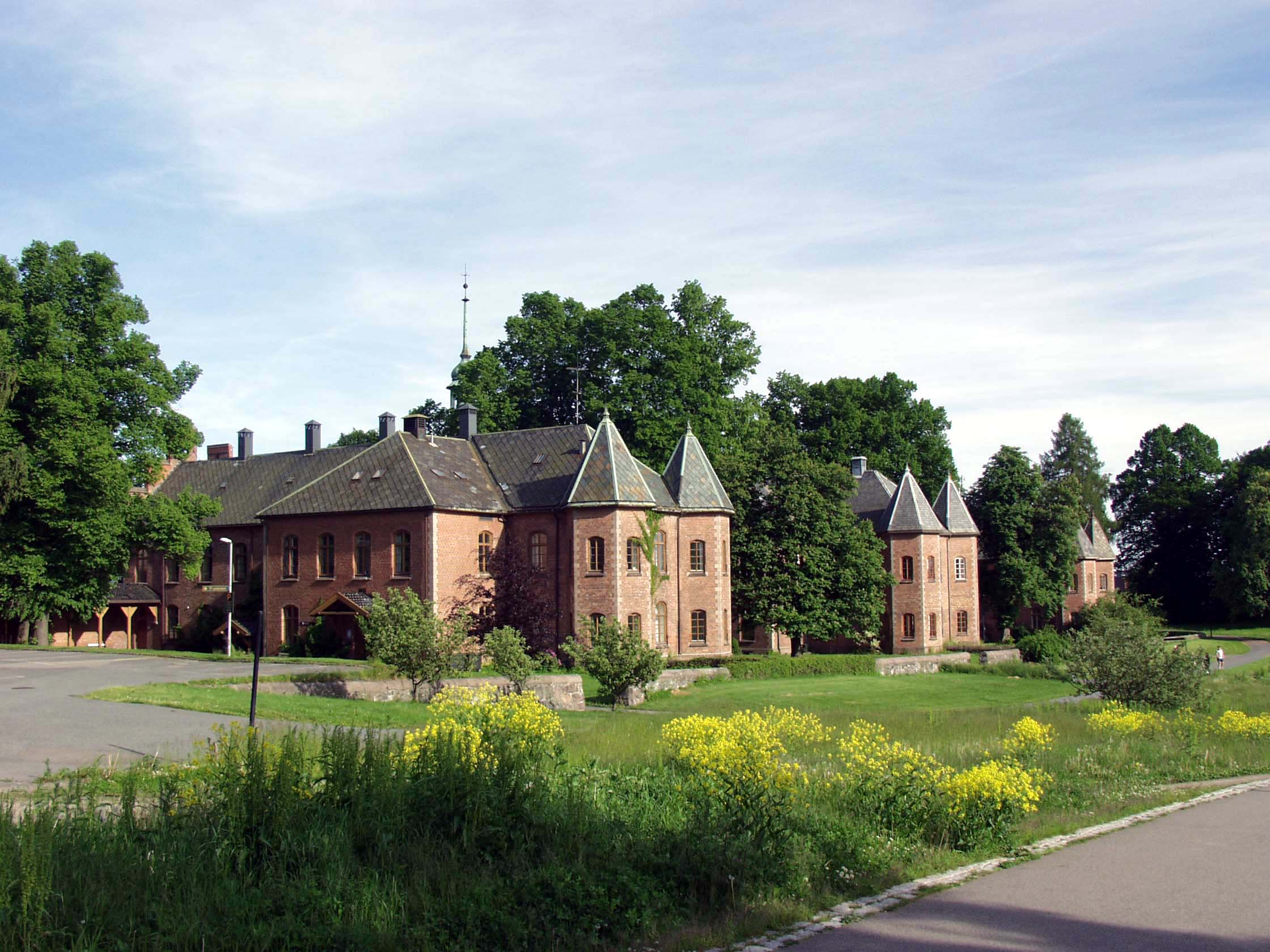
Gaustad Hospital is one of the hospitals run by Southern and Eastern Norway Regional Health Authority

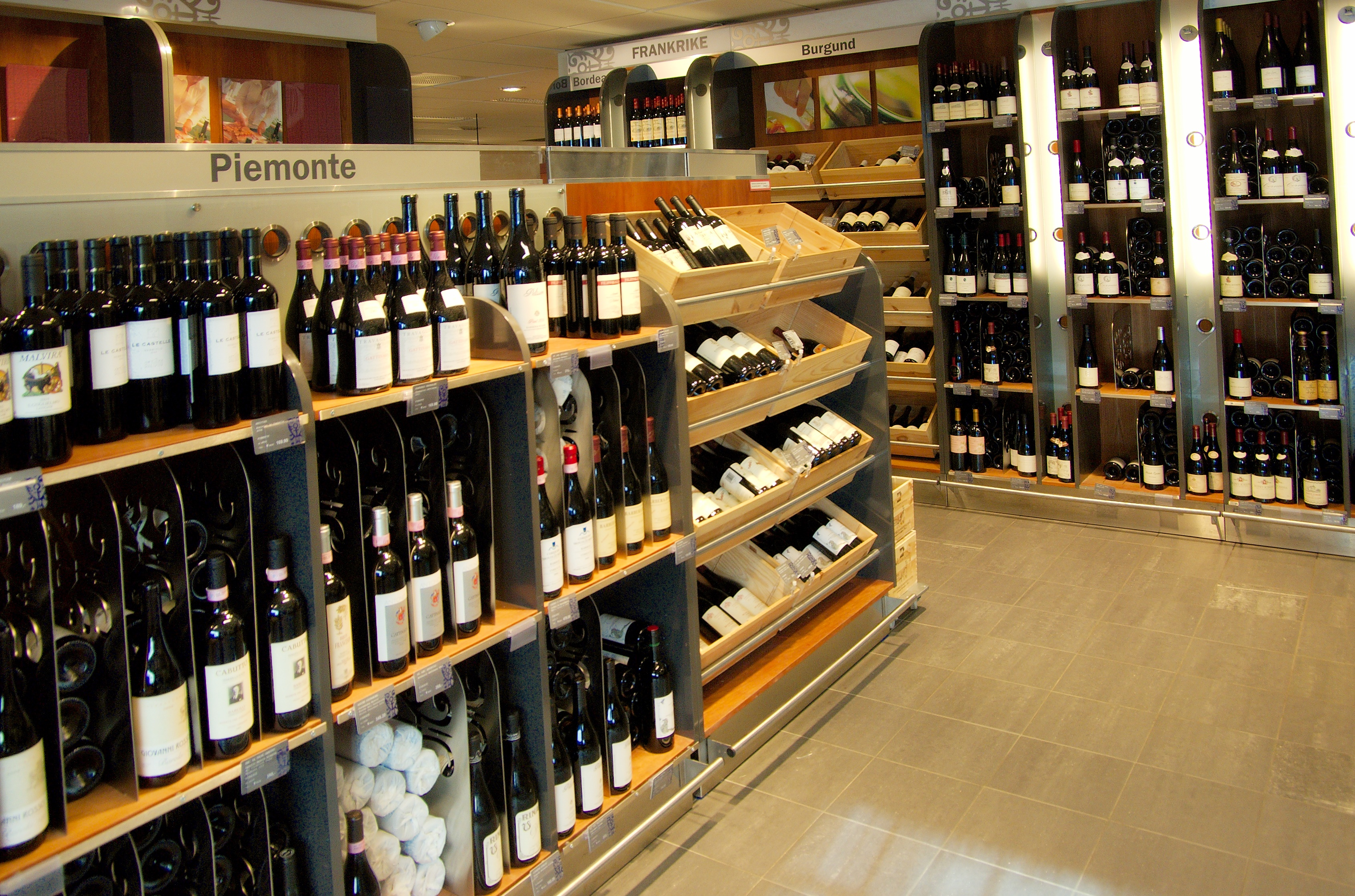
Vinmonopolet holds a monopoly on the retailing of wine and liquor

Company	Type	Cat	Ministry	Sector	Ref
Argentum Fondsinvesteringer	AS	1	Trade and Industry	Venture capital	
Avinor	AS	4	Transport and Communications	Airport operation and airspace control	Equinor
Baneservice	AS	1	Transport and Communications	Maintenance of railway infrastructure	
Bjørnøen	AS	4	Trade and Industry	Real estate	
Central Norway Regional Health Authority	RHF	—	Health and Care Services	Healthcare	
Eksportutvalget For Fisk	AS	—	Fisheries and Coastal Affairs	Marketing	—
Electronic Chart Centre	AS	3	Trade and Industry	Cartography	
Enova	SF	4	Petroleum and Energy	Marketing	—
Entra Eiendom	AS	1	Trade and Industry	Real estate	
Flytoget	AS	1	Trade and Industry	Railway company	
Gassco	AS	4	Petroleum and Energy	Natural gas pipes	—
Gassnova	SF	4	Petroleum and Energy	Research	—
Industrial Development Corporation of Norway	SF	4	Trade and Industry	Industry	—
Innovation Norway	AS	4	Trade and Industry	Innovation	—
Kompetansesenter for IT i helse- og sosialsektoren	AS	4	Health and Care Services	Information technology	—
Kings Bay	AS	4	Trade and Industry	Research	
Mesta	AS	1	Trade and Industry	Road construction and maintenance	
Nationaltheatret	AS	—	Culture and Church Affairs	Theater	—
Nofima	AS	—	Fisheries and Coastal Affairs	Research	
Norfund	AS	4	Foreign Affairs	Investments in developing countries	—
Norsk Eiendomsinformasjon	AS	4	Trade and Industry	Real estate database	—
Norsk Tipping	AS	4	Culture and Church Affairs	Lotteries and gambling	—
Northern Norway Regional Health Authority	RHF	—	Health and Care Services	Healthcare services	
Norwegian Broadcasting Corporation	AS	4	Culture and Church Affairs	Television and radio channels	—
Norwegian Social Science Data Services	AS	4	Education and Research	Research	—
Norwegian State Housing Bank	AS	—	Local Government and Regional Development	Banking	—
Petoro	AS	4	Petroleum and Energy	Manages the State's Direct Financial Interest in the petroleum industry	—
Posten Norge	AS	4	Transport and Communications	Postal services	
Rehabil	AS	—	Labour and Social Inclusion	Manufacturing	—
Secora	AS	1	Fisheries and Coastal Affairs	Maintenance of coastal infrastructure	—
Southern and Eastern Norway Regional Health Authority	RHF	—	Health and Care Services	Healthcare services	
Statkraft	AS	3	Trade and Industry	Electricity production	
Statnett	SF	4	Petroleum and Energy	Electricity lines	—
Statskog	SF	4	Agriculture and Food	Forestry and real estate	—
Staur Farm	AS	—	Agriculture and Food	Farm	—
UNINETT	AS	4	Education and Research	Telecommunications	—
University Centre in Svalbard	AS	4	Education and Research	Research	—
Venturefondet	AS	1	Trade and Industry	Venture capital	—
Vinmonopolet	AS	4	Health and Care Services	Retailing of alcoholic beverages	—
Vy	AS	4	Transport & Communications	Railway company	
Western Norway Regional Health Authority	RHF	—	Health and Care Services	Healthcare services	

== Shared ownership ==
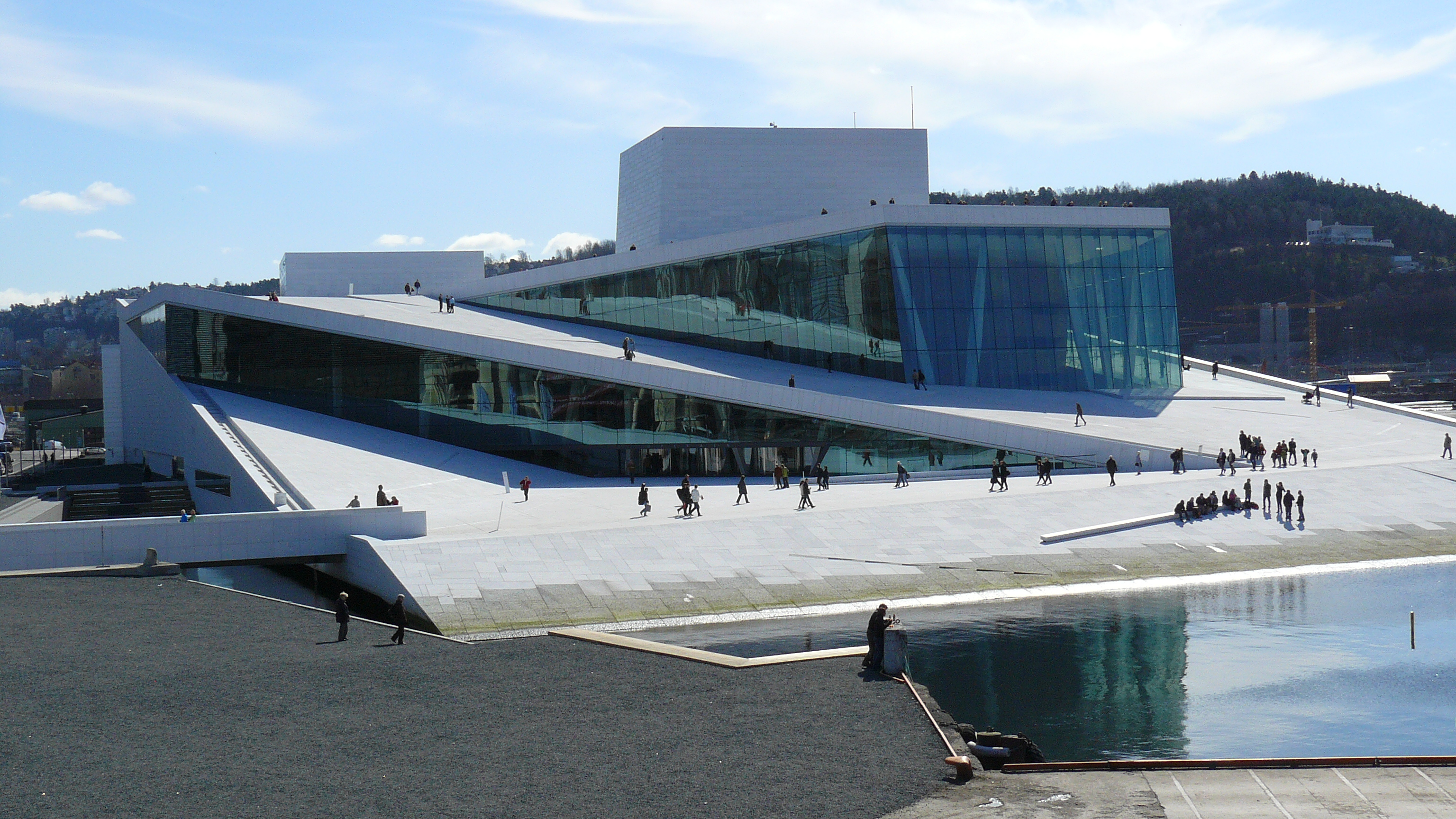
The Oslo Opera House is the seat of the Norwegian National Opera and Ballet

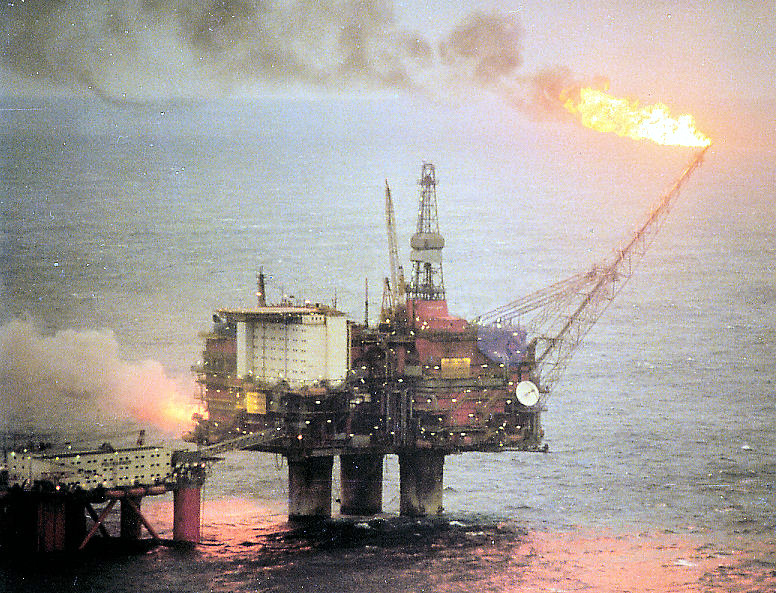
StatoilHydro operates the Statfjord A platform in the North Sea

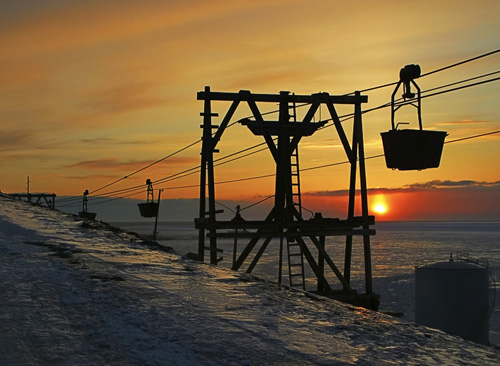
Store Norske Spitsbergen Kulkompani operates coal mines on Svalbard

Company	Stake	Cat	Sector	Ref
Aker Holding	30.0%	2	Owns 30% of Aker Solutions	
Beaivváš Sámi Theatre	40.0%	—	Theater	—
Bioparken	8.0%	—	Research	—
Adaptor	44.4%	—	Accessories for the blind	—
Carte Blanche	70.0%	—	Theater	—
Cermaq	43.5%^{†}	—	Aquaculture	
Den Nationale Scene	66.7%	—	Theater	—
DnB NOR	34.0%^{†}	2	Banking	
Eksportfinans	15.0%	1	Banking	
Filmparken	77.6%	—	Production of movies	—
Graminor	34.0%	—	Research	—
Instrumenttjenesten	45.0%	—	Telecommunications	—
Itas Amb	46.1%	4	Manufacturing	—
Kimen Såvarelaboratoriet	51.0%	—	Research	—
Kommunalbanken	80.0%	—	Banking	—
Kongsberg Gruppen	50.0%^{†}	—	Defense and maritime	
Kompetansesenter For IT I Helse- og Sosialsektoren	10.5%	—	Information technology	—
Nammo	50.0%	2	Ammunition industry	
Nordic Investment Bank	19.1%	—	Banking	—
Norsk Hydro	43.8%^{†}	2	Aluminum	
Norut Gruppen	11.6%	—	Research	—
Norwegian National Opera and Ballet	90.0%	—	Opera	—
Protevs	66.0%	—	Research	—
Rogaland Teater	66.7%	—	Theater	—
Rosenkrantzgt. 10	10.0%	—	Real estate	—
SAS Group	14.3%^{†}	1	Airline	
Simula Research Laboratory	80.0%	4	Research	—
Equinor	67%	2	Petroleum	
Store Norske Spitsbergen Kulkompani	99.9%	3	Mining	
Telenor	54.0%^{†}	2	Telecommunications	
Trøndelag Teater	66.7%	—	Theater	—
Yara International	36.2%^{†}	2	Fertilizer manufacturing	
Veterinærmedisinsk Oppdragssenter	51.0%	3	Research	—

== See also ==
- List of government-owned companies
