= Norwegian State Agriculture Bank =

Norwegian Government Bank

Norwegian State Agriculture Bank Statens Landbruksbank
- Industry: Banking
- Founded: 1965
- Defunct: 2000
- Fate: Merged
- Successor: Norwegian Agricultural Authority
- Headquarters: Norway
- Parent: Norwegian Ministry of Agriculture

Norwegian State Agriculture Bank (Norwegian: Statens Landbruksbank) is a defunct Norwegian government bank that lent money to investments within agriculture with mortgage in real estate. It was created on 5 February, 1965 as a merger between Norges Hypotekbank, Norges Småbruks- og Bustadsbank, and Driftskredittkassen for jorbruket. From 1 January, 2000, its responsibilities were transferred to the Norwegian Industrial and Regional Development Fund and the Norwegian Agricultural Authority.
