= Norway Fund =

Norway Fund may refer to:

- Norwegian State Educational Loan Fund
- The Government Pension Fund of Norway
- Norwegian Public Service Pension Fund
- Innovation Norway (Norwegian Industrial and Regional Development Fund)
- The Development Fund (Utviklingsfondet)
