= Norges Hypotekbank =

Defunct Norwegian government bank

- Industry: Banking
- Founded: 1851
- Defunct: 1965
- Fate: Merged
- Successor: Norwegian State Agriculture Bank
- Headquarters: Norway
- Products: Agricultural mortgages
- Parent: Government of Norway

Norges Hypotekbank is a defunct Norwegian government bank, created by law on September 18, 1851. Its function was to help commerce, and primarily the agricultural sector, through cheap mortgages. The seat of the bank was in Oslo, and was led by a board of three members, two appointed by the Storting and one by the King. By royal resolution of November 19, 1881, it was decided to create district offices in Bergen, Trondheim and Tromsø. The original owner equity of the bank was NOK 2 million, and by 1905 it was NOK 19.5 million. In 1965, the bank merged to form the Norwegian State Agriculture Bank.
