= Government Commission for Higher Education =

The Government Commission for Higher Education (often known as the Stjernø Commission) was a commission appointed by the Government of Norway in 2006 to present recommendations on the development of research and higher education in Norway in a 20-year perspective. The Commission presented its report, Norwegian Official Report 2008:3, in 2008. The report proposed, inter alia, to reduce the number of universities and colleges in Norway to eight or ten.

== Members ==
The Commission consisted of the following members

- Steinar Stjernø
- Irene Dahl Andersen
- Marianne Andreassen
- Peter Arbo
- Agneta Bladh
- Kirsti Kolle Grøndahl
- Marianne Harg
- Peter Maassen
- Jens Maseng
- Ernst Nordtveit
- Kathrine Skretting
- Katrine Elida Aaland
