= Peter Arbo =

Peter Arbo may refer to:

- Peter Arbo (academic) (born 1953), Norwegian social scientist
- Peter Nicolai Arbo (1831–1892), Norwegian historical painter
- Peter Nicolaj Arbo (1768–1827), Norwegian-Danish timber trader and landowner
