= National Institute of Occupational Safety and Health =

National Institute of Occupational Safety and Health refers to agencies of several governments relating to occupational safety and health.

- National Institute for Occupational Safety and Health (United States)—note that the name contains "for" rather than "of"
- National Institute of Occupational Safety and Health (Malaysia)
- National Institute of Occupational Safety and Health (Japan)
- National Institute of Occupational Safety and Health (Sri Lanka)
- National Institute of Occupational Health (Norway)
- National Institute for Occupational Health (South Africa)
