= Norwegian Directorate for Education and Training =

Norwegian government agency

- Utdanningsdirektoratet

Government agency overview
- Formed: 15 June 2004
- Jurisdiction: Government of Norway
- Headquarters: Oslo, Norway
- Government agency executive: Hege Nilssen, director
- Parent Government agency: Norwegian Ministry of Education and Research
- Website: www.udir.no

The Norwegian Directorate for Education and Training (Norwegian: Utdanningsdirektoratet, UDIR) is a Norwegian government agency under the Ministry of Education and Research. The Directorate is responsible for the development of kindergarten, primary and secondary education – including vocational training. The Norwegian Support System for Special Education (Statped) is managed by the Directorate.

The organisation, is headquarters is based in Oslo with branches in Hamar, Molde and Tromsø. The Directorate was established in 2004 by then-Minister of Education Kristin Clemet. Its director from 2004 to 2015 was Petter Skarheim. Hege Nilssen is the director general (2015-.)

In 2018, the Directorate for Education was merged with the Norwegian Center for ICT in Education.

== Annulment of exam results in 2011 ==
The results of student examinations were annulled for all 1698 test takers (in subject "matematikk 1 T"), because the agency had e-mailed the questions prior to the exam, as instructed by a non-authorized recipient.
