= Norwegian Archive, Library and Museum Authority =

Norwegian government agency

- Statens senter for arkiv, bibliotek og museum

Government agency overview
- Formed: 2003
- Headquarters: Oslo, Norway
- Government agency executive: Stein Slyngstad, Director
- Parent Government agency: Norwegian Ministry of Culture and Church Affairs
- Website: www.abm-utvikling.no

The Norwegian Archive, Library and Museum Authority (ABM-utvikling or Statens senter for arkiv, bibliotek og museum) is a Norwegian government agency under the Norwegian Ministry of Culture and Church Affairs responsible for archival, library and museum services.

The Norwegian Archive, Library and Museum Authority has several web services, with kulturnett.no and the Norwegian Digital Library the most prominent.

It was founded on 1 January 2003, following the merger of the Norwegian Directorate for Public Libraries, the Norwegian Museum Authority, and the National Office for Research Documentation, Academic and Special Libraries.

== See also ==
- Norwegian Year of Cultural Heritage 2009
- List of museums in Norway
- Government agencies in Norway
