= Norwegian Universities and Colleges Admission Service =

Norwegian government agency

- Samordna opptak

Agency overview
- Formed: 1991
- Jurisdiction: Government of Norway
- Headquarters: Oslo
- Employees: 26 centrally + 10 hired IT-staff
- Annual budget: Ca 21.000.000 NOK
- Agency executive: Bente Ringlund, Daglig leder
- Website: www.samordnaopptak.no

The Norwegian Universities and Colleges Admission Service (Norwegian: Samordna opptak) is a Norwegian government agency responsible for application and admission to all public universities and university colleges in Norway for entry level degrees, either Bachelor degrees for liberal studies and some professional studies, as well as certain Master level programs in professional studies. The agency is subordinate to the Norwegian Ministry of Education and Research and is managed by the University of Oslo.

== History ==
Traditionally Norwegian universities and colleges had a system of local admission control. This system was tedious since each person had to apply to each institution and it was difficult to manage declines from students who were accepted to other institutions. Particularly in 1990 there was a massive increase in the application to higher educations and this resulted in an immense workload on the local administrators.

To solve this problem, the Government initiated a program to effectivise the application and admission system. Until 1994 the system merely collected information from the institutions, but from 1995 for the colleges and 1997 for the universities the admission rankings were centralized through the system so each applicant only got one admission place. From 1999 application via the Internet was possible, and from 2008 only online application is possible. After 2000 the grades from the upper secondary schools are automatically transferred to the system.

== How it works ==
The system opens on February 1 each year, with application deadline April 15. Some special groups have application deadline March 1. On the application up to ten prioritized programs can be specified. The order of their programs can be altered up to July 1, but no new program can be added after April 15. On July 20 the main admission is run and made known to the applicants, and no one is given more than one admission; on the highest ranked program that the candidate is qualified for and has enough points for after a specialized stable marriage algorithm. Programs with more applicants get waiting lists. Later in the summer and during the fall more people are admitted from the lists if enough people from the main admission decline the places. Studies with insufficient applicants to fill up become part of the Remains Market (Restetorget), which offers first-to-grab principle after the main application. Only entry-level programs are run through the system. Admission from bachelor to master level programs is still handled locally.

The applicants is ranked on a point scheme, where the qualified candidates with the most points are given admission. The qualifications vary from program to program, but almost all require general university admissions certification. Some programs, like engineering or medicine require extra upper secondary level courses in mathematics and sciences, which can be attained through a foundation course in engineering. The points are based first on the average grade from upper secondary school, multiplied by ten. Additional points are awarded for sciences, age, specialization and completed 60 ECTS credits or military service. Quota points for gender are applicable for some programs.

The institution who owns the top prioritized program on each application is defined as the case handler for that application. The case handler sets the correct points values and (dis)qualification codes. Often helped by the national database for upper secondary school diplomas, also run by Samordna opptak. Each applicant has in average 1.1 case handlers compared to one per institution before 1995.

== Numbers ==
In 2007 92,750 people applied for studying through the system, of which 76,936 sent in necessary documentation and 69,529 were qualified. Two of three people who were offered a place through the main admission, were granted their first choice. There are about 1,200 possible programs at seven universities and about 40 colleges.
