= Ministry of Energy (Norway) =

Government ministry of Norway

Royal Ministry of Energy
- Det kongelige energidepartementet

Agency overview
- Formed: 11 January 1978; 1 January 1997; 29 years ago (2nd form)
- Preceding agency: Ministry of Industry
- Dissolved: 1 January 1993 (1st form)
- Jurisdiction: Government of Norway
- Headquarters: Oslo
- Minister responsible: Terje Aasland, Minister of Energy
- Agency executive: Villa Kulild, Secretary General
- Website: Official website

Footnotes
- List of Norwegian ministries

The Royal Norwegian Ministry of Energy (Norwegian: Energidepartementet) is a Norwegian ministry responsible for energy, including petroleum and natural gas production in the North Sea. It is led by Minister of Energy Terje Aasland of the Labour Party since 2022. The department must report to the legislature, the Storting.

== History ==
The ministry was originally established in 1978, where petroleum and energy affairs were transferred from the Ministry of Industry. It was merged into the Ministry of Industry as to become Ministry of Industry and Energy in 1993. In 1997, petroleum and energy affairs was once again transferred to the current ministry. It was renamed again in 2024 as Ministry of Energy.

== Organisation ==
=== Political staff ===
As of June 2023, the political staff of the ministry is as follows:

- Minister Terje Aasland (Labour Party)
- State Secretary Andreas Bjelland Eriksen (Labour Party)
- State Secretary Astrid Bergmål (Labour Party)
- State Secretary Elisabeth Sæther (Labour Party)
- Political Advisor Jorid Juliussen Nordmelan (Labour Party)

=== Departments ===
The ministry is divided into four departments and a communication unit.

- Communication Unit
- Technology and Industry Department
- Energy and Water Resources Department
- Department of Trade and Industrial Economics
- Administration, Budgets and Accounting Department

=== Subsidiaries ===
Subordinate government agencies:

- Norwegian Petroleum Directorate
- Norwegian Water Resources and Energy Directorate
- Gassnova
- Statnett

Wholly owned limited companies:

- Gassco
- Petoro

Partially owned public limited companies:

- Equinor (62% ownership)
