= Norwegian Public Service Pension Fund =

- Type: Government agency
- Industry: Financial services
- Founded: 1917
- Headquarters: Oslo, Norway
- Area served: Norway
- Number of employees: 483 (2026)
- Parent: Ministry of Labour (Norway)
- Website: www.spk.no

Norwegian Public Service Pension Fund (Norwegian: Statens Pensjonskasse) is a Norwegian government agency responsible for the extra pensions paid to state employees. It was established in 1917. Around 1,300 employers and about one million people are connected to the fund as members or pensioners, and it has total assets of NOK 270 billion.

All state employees are granted an extra pension of 2% of their gross wages, paid from 67 years of age. Municipal and county employees have their extra pensions managed by Kommunal Landspensjonskasse (KLP). The Pension Fund also manages the extra pensions from a number of government-owned enterprises.

== See also ==
- Pensions in Norway
