= Jørn Rattsø =

Norwegian academic

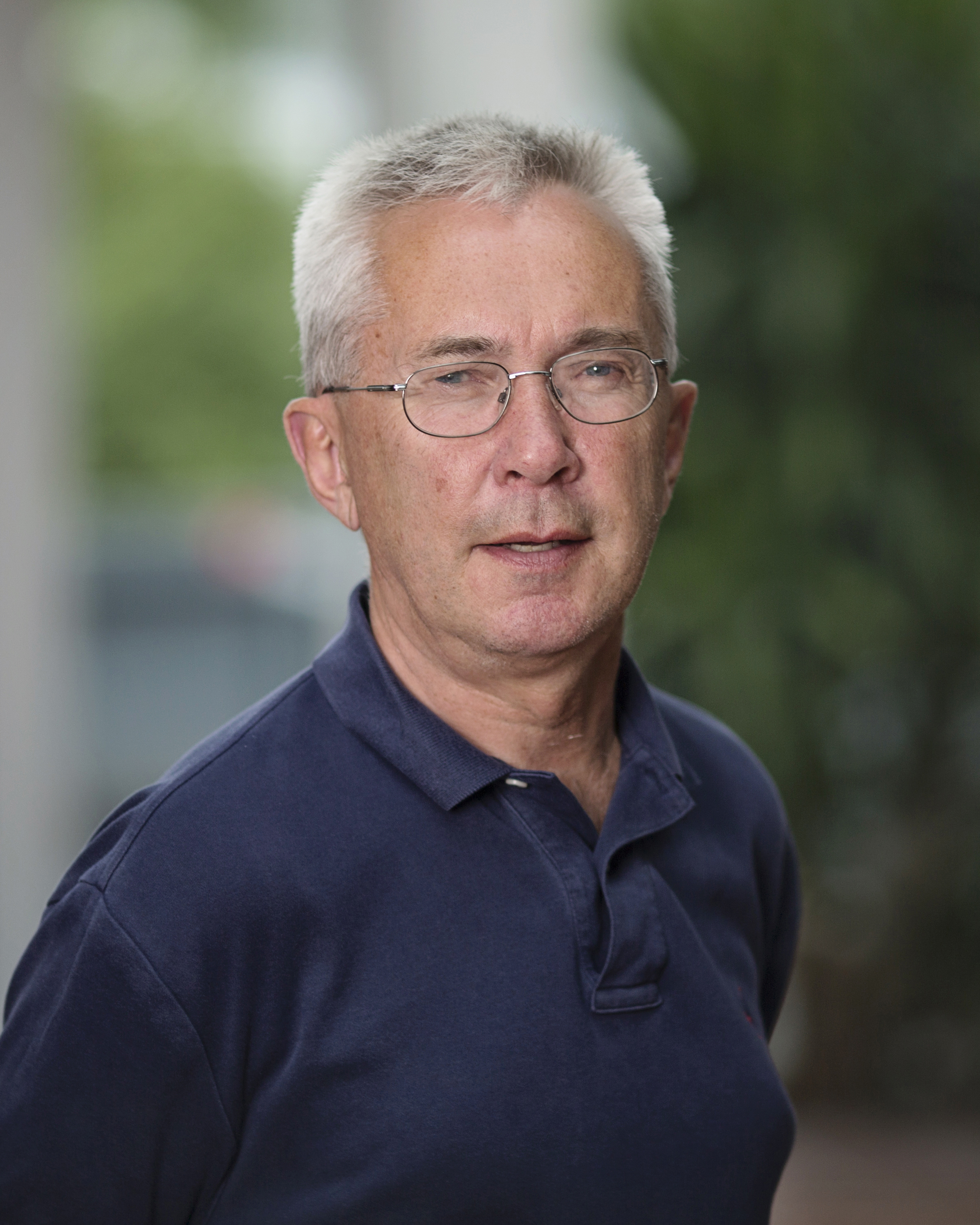
Jørn Rattsø

Jørn Rattsø (born 27 September 1952 in Stjørdal Municipality) is a Norwegian professor of economics at the Norwegian University of Science and Technology (NTNU) and chairman of Enova.

== Biography ==
As a young adult (1975–1976) Rattsø was leader of Young Liberals of Norway, the youth wing of the Liberal Party.

He is a graduate of the University of Oslo, where he earned a cand.oecon. degree in 1978 and a dr.philos. degree in 1988. He worked as a researcher for the Norwegian Institute of Urban and Rural Research (1978 to 1979) and the Research Council of Norway (1980 to 1982). From 1982 to 1990 he was associate professor of economics at the University of Trondheim, and was appointed professor in 1990. The university merged to form NTNU in 1996. His articles on economics have been cited extensively.

Jørn Rattsø has also studied or been associated with Harvard, MIT, Oxford, Cambridge and Berkeley (California) Universities.

Preceded by Carl Johan Sverdrup	Chairman of Young Liberals of Norway; 1975–1976	Succeeded by Ottar Grepstad
