= Secora =

Norwegian construction company

Secora AS
- Company type: Private
- Industry: Construction
- Predecessors: Norwegian Coastal Administration
- Founded: 2005; 21 years ago
- Defunct: 22 September 2022
- Fate: Bankruptcy
- Headquarters: Svolvær, Norway
- Area served: Scandinavia
- Number of employees: 112 (2012)
- Parent: Ministry of Fisheries and Coastal Affairs (2005–11); Ministry of Trade and Industry (2011–12); Torghatten (2012–22); Gerd Stensen (2022)
- Website: www.secora.no

Secora AS was a maritime construction company, focusing on water transport infrastructure, such as sea lanes and ports. The company was based in Svolvær, Norway. The company was established in 2005, when the construction and maintenance division of the Norwegian Coastal Administration was spun off. It was originally owned by the Ministry of Fisheries and Coastal Affairs. Secora soon established a subsidiary based in Gothenburg, Sweden, which operated in the Swedish and Danish market. Ownership had by 2011 passed to the Ministry of Trade and Industry.

Parliament approved the sale and privatization of Secora in 2011, and on 16 November 2012 it was sold to Torghatten. At the time Secora had 112 employees. Torghatten had a subsidiary, Maritime Venture, which operated in the same sector, and a majority stake in Seløy Undervannservice. Torghatten paid 45 million kroner for Secora.

Secora had a revenue of 150 million kroner in 2005, which had increased to 233 million in 2011. However, by the late 2010s the company was struggling financially. Revenue was down to 120 million in 2018 and then 83 million in 2021. It made a loss of 10 million kroner in 2020 and a loss of 35 million in 2021. Torghatten sold the company to Leknes-based Gerd Stensen on 31 March 2022. With 65 million in outstanding debt, the company could not be saved, and filed for bankruptcy 22 September 2022.
