= Norwegian Industrial Property Office =

The Norwegian Industrial Property Office
- Company type: Agency
- Industry: regulation of and contribution to more efficient operation of businesses
- Founded: 2 January 1911
- Headquarters: Oslo, Norway
- Area served: Norway
- Key people: Kathrine Myhre (Director)
- Products: Patents; Trademarks; Industrial design rights
- Number of employees: 270
- Parent: Norwegian Ministry of Trade and Industry
- Website: patentstyret.no

The Norwegian Industrial Property Office (Norwegian: Patentstyret or Patentstyrets første avdeling), also known as Norwegian Patent Office (Norwegian: Patentstyret), is a government agency responsible for registration of patents, trademarks and design in Norway. The agency is subordinate to the Ministry of Trade and Industry and located in Oslo.

== See also ==
- Nordic Patent Institute
