= Tariffnemnda =

Governmental board of Norway

Tariffnemnda or the Collective Bargaining Board of Norway is a governmental board under the supervision of the Norwegian Ministry of Labour and Social Affairs. The board rules on the universal extension of collective bargaining agreements. Within fields where the board deems there to be a demonstrable problem of social dumping or similar exploitation of labor, the board has the authority to extend a collective bargaining agreement that applies to the field to any worker within that field, whether the worker is unionized or not. In effect, this establishes a minimum wage within several fields covered by universally extended collective bargaining agreements, although Norway does not have a universally applicable minimum wage.

As of 2015, eight collective bargaining agreements have been extended. These apply to

- Construction workers
- Shipping and shipyard workers
- Workers in the agricultural industry
- Workers in the cleaning industry
- Workers in the fishing industry
- Electricians, except offshore workers
- Workers in the freight transport industry
- Bus drivers
