= Norwegian National Collection Agency =

Norwegian government agency

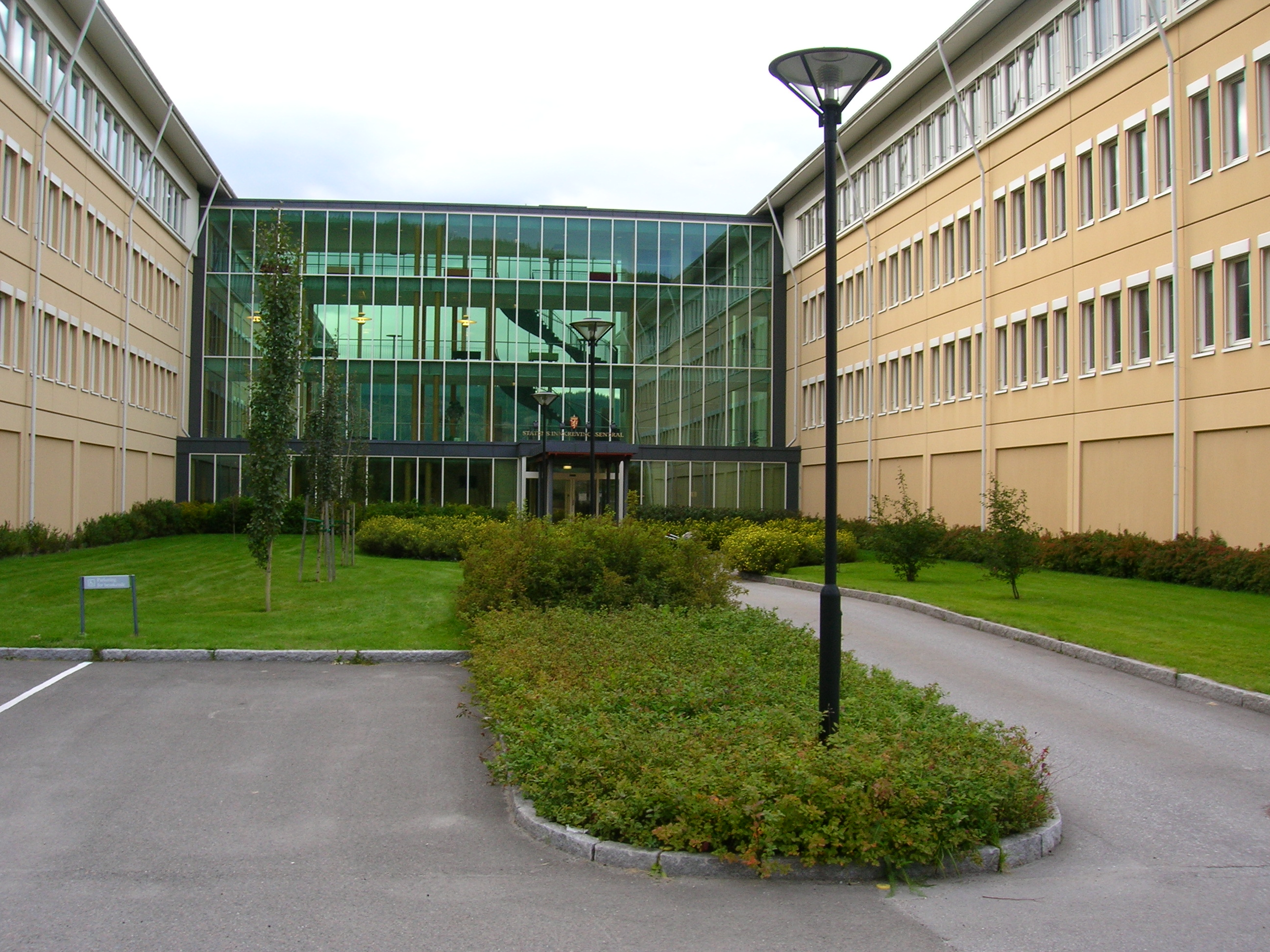
- Type: Government agency
- Industry: Financial service
- Founded: 1990
- Defunct: 31 December 2025
- Headquarters: Mo i Rana, Norway
- Area served: Norway
- Products: Debt collection
- Number of employees: 365 (2016)
- Parent: Norwegian Ministry of Finance
- Website: www.sismo.no
- Footnotes; From 2015 Statens innkrevingssentral was included in The Norwegian Tax Administration (Skatteetaten).

The Norwegian National Collection Agency (Norwegian: Statens Innkrevingssentral) is a Norwegian government agency responsible for the collection of all fines issued by the police as well as debt collection from defaulted government taxes or other government debts. The agency was founded in 1990, and is located in Mo i Rana. From 2015 Statens innkrevingssentral was included in the Norwegian Tax Administration.
