= Stein Slyngstad =

Norwegian cultural administrator (born 1960)

Stein Slyngstad (born 25 November 1960) is a Norwegian cultural administrator.

He hails from Skui, and holds a siv.øk. degree. He was the director of the Stavanger Symphony Orchestra and the Stavanger Konserthus 1992 to 1997, manager of the Henie-Onstad Art Centre 1997 to 2001, director of the Norwegian Film Fund from 2001 to 2008 and the Norwegian Archive, Library and Museum Authority since 2009. When the authority was discontinued on 1 January 2011, he continued in the Arts Council Norway.

Civic offices
Preceded by Leikny Haga Indergaard (acting)	Director of the Norwegian Archive, Library and Museum Authority; 2009–2010	Succeeded by position abolished
