= Hanne Blåfjelldal =

Norwegian politician

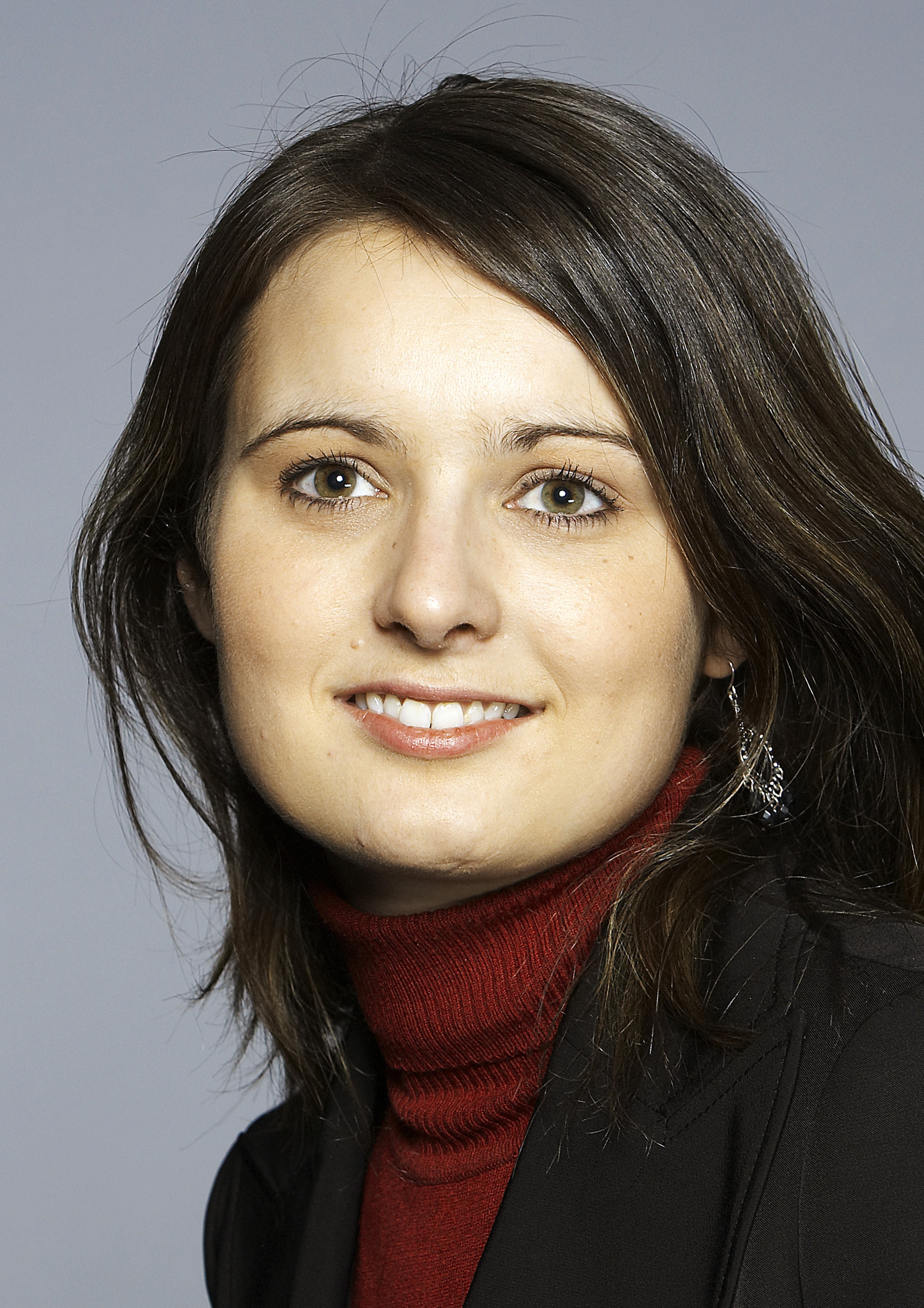
Blåfjelldal in 2009

Hanne Maren Blåfjelldal (born 27 May 1981) is a Norwegian politician for the Progress Party. She has been state secretatary for Sylvi Listhaug in the Ministry of Agriculture and Food since October 2013.

Blåfjelldal hails from Sør-Aurdal Municipality in Valdres. She was a member of the Oppland county council from 2003–2007 and 2011–2012. She was also a member of the municipal council of Sør-Aurdal Municipality from 2007–2010.

She worked as a political consultant on educational and church affairs for the Progress Party's parliamentary group 2003–2007. She served as deputy leader of the Progress Party's Youth 2008–2010 and was a member of the Executive Board of the Progress Party 2011–2013. She was first deputy member to the Parliament of Norway for the Progress Party from Oppland 2009–2013.

In 2007, she obtained a Master's degree in Human geography at the University of Oslo. She undertook one year of study in pedagogy (Norw: Praktisk-pedagogisk utdanning) in 2010. She was manager for an educational project in Vågå Municipality from 2010–2012 and worked as a teacher in Høyanger Municipality from 2012–2013.
