= Ministry of Trade, Industry and Fisheries =

Government ministry of Norway

Royal Ministry of Trade, Industry and Fisheries
- Det kongelige nærings- og fiskeridepartementet

Agency overview
- Formed: 1 January 2014
- Preceding agencies: Ministry of Trade and Industry; Ministry of Fisheries and Coastal Affairs
- Jurisdiction: Government of Norway
- Headquarters: Oslo
- Ministers responsible: Cecilie Myrseth, Minister of Trade and Industry; Marianne Sivertsen Næss, Minister of Fisheries and Ocean Policy
- Agency executive: Mette I. Wikborg, Secretary-General
- Website: Official website

Footnotes
- List of Norwegian ministries

The Royal Norwegian Ministry of Trade, Industry and Fisheries (Norwegian: Nærings- og fiskeridepartementet, NFD) is a Norwegian ministry responsible for business, trade, industry, and the fisheries industry.

In addition, the ministry was transferred the competition policy department from the former Ministry of Government Administration, Reform and Church Affairs, as well as the responsibility for company legislation from the Ministry of Justice and Public Security.

The ministry was formed in January 2014 following the merge of two ministries, the Ministry of Trade and Industry and Ministry of Fisheries and Coastal Affairs

== Organisation ==
=== Political staff ===
As of 19 April 2024, the political staff of the ministry is as follows:

- Minister of Trade and Industry Cecilie Myrseth (Labour Party)
  - State Secretary Halvard Ingebrigtsen (Labour Party)
  - State Secretary Anne Marit Bjørnflaten (Labour Party)
  - State Secretary Odd Steinar Åfar Viseth (Labour Party)
  - State Secretary Bhanuja Rasiah (Labour Party)
- Minister of Fisheries and Ocean Policy Marianne Sivertsen Næss (Labour Party)
  - State Secretary Vidar Ulriksen (Labour Party)
  - State Secretary Kristina Sigurdsdottir Hansen (Labour Party)
  - Political Adviser Anette Kristine Davidsen (Labour Party)

=== Departments ===
The ministry is divided into nine departments and an information unit.

- Communication Unit
- Department of Administrative Affairs
- Ownership Department
- Economic Policy Department
- Department of Maritime Policy and Coastal Development
- Trade Policy Department
- Research and Innovation Department
- Department for Aquaculture
- Department for Fisheries
- Department of Competition Policy and Economic Analysis

== See also ==
- Minister of Trade and Industry (Norway)
- Minister of Fisheries and Ocean Policy
- Politics of Norway
