= Ingeborg Moen Borgerud =

Norwegian businesswoman and politician

- Born: 23 September 1949 (age 76); Porsgrunn, Norway
- Occupations: Lawyer; Businessperson; Politician (formerly)

Ingeborg Moen Borgerud (born 23 September 1949) is a Norwegian lawyer, businessperson and former politician for the Labour Party.

== Career ==
She was born in Porsgrunn. In her early career she worked in Akershus County Municipality, the Norwegian Ministry of Justice and the Police, Oslo Probate Court, and under the Norwegian Parliamentary Ombudsman. She then became deputy leader of the judicial department in the Norwegian Confederation of Trade Unions. In September 1992, she was appointed State Secretary in the Ministry of Justice and the Police, in Brundtland's Third Cabinet. She remained here until 1996.

She held several public posts. In 1987 she was named as a member of Klagenemnda for likestilling. She was the deputy chair of the Norwegian Savings Banks' Guarantee Fund. She has contributed to public committees that produce Norwegian Official Reports. She chaired the committees that delivered the Norwegian Official Report 2003:2 on discrimination and 2004:5 on the working environment. The Norwegian Confederation of Trade Unions lambasted her committee's report on the working environment as being hostile to common workers. She was also a member of the committees that delivered the Norwegian Official Report 1994:19 about banking and finance, and 1994:20 (about personal injury compensation, 2001:32 (about civil trials and 2001:33 about arbitration, the committee was named in 1999). She is also a member of the Quarantine Committee, which works with quarantines between a person's active career in politics and a new career in other sectors.

She became a deputy board member of NSB (Norwegian State Railways) in October 2000. She advanced to deputy chair in June 2001, when Gunn Wærsted left the board. In September 2003 she advanced to acting chair when Olav Fjell left the board. In February 2004, she began work on the extraordinary stockholders' congress. She was also the chair of the Norwegian National Courts Administration for many years. She became a board member of Norsk Eiendomsinformasjon in 2006, and chair of Eidsiva Energi in 2008.

As a lawyer, she works in the company Arntzen de Besche. She was the lawyer of Ingunn Yssen during the Valla scandal in 2007. She also represented one of the paramedics in the Ali Farah case. In 2007, she co-wrote the book Arbeidsrett. Særlig om omstilling i offentlig sektor, released on Universitetsforlaget.

Business positions
Preceded by Olav Fjell	Chair of NSB (acting 2003–2004); 2003–2014	Succeeded by Kai G. Henriksen
