= Peter Arbo (academic) =

Norwegian social scientist and professor (born 1953)

Peter Nicolai Arbo (born 22 August 1953, Bodø) is a Norwegian social scientist, and professor at the Norwegian College of Fishery Science at the University of Tromsø.

== Work ==
Arbo has served as a board member at the University of Tromsø and as a member of several government commissions, including the Government Commission for Higher Education 2006–2008 (also known as the Stjernø Commission after its chairman Steinar Stjernø), which presented its report on the development of Norwegian higher education in a 20-year perspective in 2008, and of the EEA Review Committee, which was appointed by the government in 2010 to review Norway's agreements with the EU. He is the vice chairman of the board of the Industrial Development Corporation of Norway, appointed by the government. He is also the chairman of the programme board of the Research Council of Norway research programme Democracy and Governance in a Regional Context.

His research areas are innovation, regional development, public policy and planning, and the Northern and Arctic areas. He has also been a guest lecturer for the diplomatic trainee programme of the Ministry of Foreign Affairs.

He studied regional planning at the University of Tromsø, and attended the College of Europe 1981–1982 (Promotion Johan Willem Beyen). In 1985, he obtained the cand.polit. degree at the University of Tromsø, with a thesis on the structuring of labour markets.

== Books ==
- Peter Arbo, Tove Bull and Ådne Danielsen: Utdanningssamfunnet og livslang læring, Gyldendal 2013, ISBN 978-82-05-44707-3
- Peter Arbo and Bjørn Hersoug: Oljevirksomhetens inntog i nord – næringsutvikling, politikk og samfunn, Gyldendal 2010, ISBN 978-82-05-40380-2
- Peter Arbo and Hallgeir Gammelsæter: Innovasjonspolitikkens scenografi – nye perspektiver på næringsutvikling, Tapir 2004, ISBN 978-82-519-1935-7
