= Norwegian Agency for Quality Assurance in Education =

Norwegian government agency

The Norwegian Agency for Quality Assurance in Education, NOKUT is a Norwegian government agency, established in 2003 as part of the Quality Reform. Its areas of responsibility include quality assessment of Norwegian universities, university colleges and colleges of tertiary vocational education, and assessment of foreign higher education. NOKUT has 76 employees, and its director is Terje Mørland.

Each year since 2014, NOKUT has been collecting survey data from the national student survey Studiebarometeret which measures the perceived quality of education for study programmes offered by the higher education institutions in Norway.
