= Petter Skarheim =

Norwegian civil servant (born 1962)

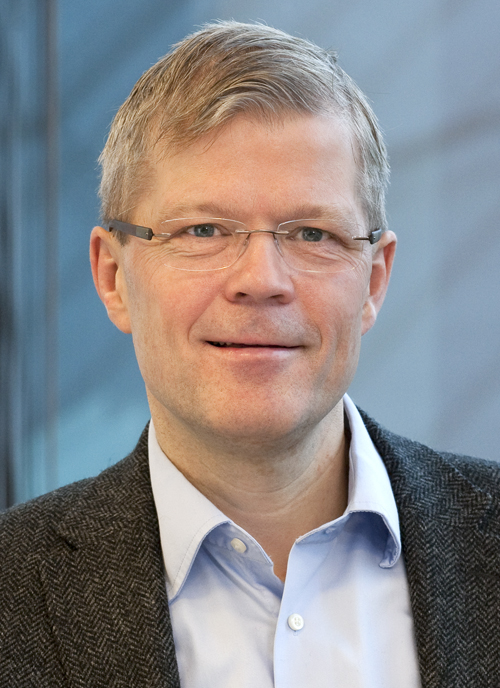
Petter Skarheim Credit: Jannecke Sanne

Petter Skarheim (born 12 June 1962) is a Norwegian civil servant. He is Secretary General of the Ministry of Education and Research.

In 2004 he was appointed director of the newly established Norwegian Directorate for Education and Training. He had been a deputy under-secretary of State in the Ministry of Education and Research from 1998 to 2004.

Preceded by position created	Director of the Norwegian Directorate for Education and Training; 2004–present	Incumbent
