= Mette Wikborg =

Norwegian civil servant (born 1963)

- Born: 15 April 1963 (age 62)
- Occupation: Civil servant

Mette Wikborg (born 15 April 1963) is a Norwegian civil servant. Since 2018 she serves as permanent under-secretary of state in the Ministry of Trade, Industry and Fisheries.

== Personal life and career ==
Born on 15 April 1963, Wikborg has assumed leading positions in various government ministries. She served as deputy under-secretary of state (ekspedisjonssjef) in the Ministry of Trade, Industry and Fisheries, in the department for research and innovation until 2008, when she was appointed as leader (ekspedisjonssjef) of the department responsible for the government's company ownership. In 2018 she was appointed permanent under-secretary of state (secretary-general, departementsråd) in the Ministry of Trade, Industry and Fisheries.
