= Ambita AS =

Company owned by the Norwegian Ministry of Trade and Industry

- Industry: Web portals
- Founded: 1987
- Headquarters: Oslo, Norway
- Number of employees: 82 (2026)
- Website: ambita.com

Ambita AS, formerly known as Norsk Eiendomsinformasjon AS, is a Norwegian limited company, wholly owned by the Norwegian Ministry of Trade and Industry.

It was established as in 1987 as Tinglysingsdata AS, through an agreement between the Norwegian Ministry of Justice and the Police, Kommunedata and Statens Datasentral. Property data was to be electronically stored, and this was implemented in offices in Kirkenes, Namsos, Grimstad and Brumunddal. Tinglysingsdata changed its name to Norsk Eiendomsinformasjon on 1 January 1994.

Its responsibilities are within land information and development of land register systems. The national property registry, Eiendomsregisteret, is updated by the Norwegian Mapping and Cadastre Authority, but the information in it is distributed by Norsk Eiendomsinformasjon.

The chief executive officer is Stig Williams Seljeseth, and the board consists of Tormod Hermansen (chair), Ingeborg Moen Borgerud (deputy chair), Per Jahren, Toril Nag, Anders Roger Øynes, Jarl Totland and Mona Andreassen. The organizational headquarters are in Solli plass, Oslo with a branch in Bergen.
