= Norwegian Directorate of Mining =

Norwegian government agency

Directorate of Mining with the Commissioner of Mines at Svalbard
- Company type: Government agency
- Industry: regulation of and contribution to more efficient operation of businesses
- Founded: 1986
- Headquarters: Trondheim, Norway
- Area served: Norway
- Number of employees: 18 (2007)
- Parent: Norwegian Ministry of Trade and Industry
- Website: www.dirmin.no

The Norwegian Directorate of Mining with the Commissioner of Mines at Svalbard (Norwegian: Bergvesenet med Bergmesteren for Svalbard) is a Norwegian government agency responsible for administrating the extraction of mineral resources within the kingdom. The directorate is subordinate to the Ministry of Trade and Industry and co-located with the Norwegian Geological Survey in Trondheim, with a separate office in Longyearbyen.

A total of 18 employees see to the administration of mining legislation, registering claims, approving mine plans and supervising the extractive industry. It is also the supervisory authority concerning environmental impact assessment for planned extraction.

== History ==
The directorate was created in 1986 when the five mining authority districts were merged into one agency. This process was concluded in 1994. From 2003 the Commission er Mines at Svalbard was merged into the directorate.
