= Industrial Development Corporation of Norway =

Norwegian government development investment enterprise

SIVA SF
- Type: State Enterprise
- Industry: management consulting
- Founded: 1968
- Headquarters: Trondheim, Norway
- Area served: Norway
- Key people: Erik Haugane (CEO); Åslaug Haga (chair); Peter Arbo (vice chair)
- Revenue: NOK 60 million (2005)
- Number of employees: 32 (2007)
- Parent: Norwegian Ministry of Trade and Industry
- Website: www.siva.no

The Industrial Development Corporation of Norway or SIVA (Norwegian: Selskapet for industrivekst) is a Norwegian state enterprise responsible for government investment in incubators, science parks, industrial parks and real estate through partial ownership of other companies. The ultimate goal is to stimulate economic growth, through strengthening Norway's capacity related to innovation and creativity.

SIVA is based in Trondheim, where it employs almost 40 people. Through its investments there are about 8,000 employees in total. Investments include 46 industry and business parks in Norway, one in Russia, one in Latvia and two in Lithuania. It also holds partial ownership of 15 science- and 10 research parks, 20 incubators, 45 business gardens, 12 venture capital institutions and 4 research and development companies. SIVA cooperates closely with the Research Council of Norway and Innovation Norway.
