= Ministry of Trade and Industry (Norway) =

Former government ministry of Norway

Royal Ministry of Trade and Industry
- Nærings- og handelsdepartementet

Agency overview
- Formed: 1 October 1916
- Preceding agency: Ministry of Social Affairs
- Dissolved: 31 December 2013
- Superseding agency: Ministry of Trade, Industry and Fisheries
- Jurisdiction: Government of Norway
- Headquarters: Kongens gate 8, Oslo, Norway
- Employees: 207 (2011)

Footnotes
- List of Norwegian ministries

The Royal Norwegian Ministry of Trade and Industry (Norwegian: Nærings- og handelsdepartementet) was a Norwegian ministry responsible for business, trade and industry.

It was first created in 1916, as the Ministry of Trade (Ministry of Foreign Affairs, Trade, Shipping and Industry). It took its final name in 1997. The department must report to the legislature, Storting.

On 1 January 2014, the ministry was dissolved and the minister portfolio was incorporated into the new Ministry of Trade, Industry and Fisheries.

== History ==
Responsibilities for trade and industry was originally established in the Ministry of Foreign Affairs, Trade, Shipping and Industry in 1903. It was not until 1916 where a separate ministry was formed, as the previous ministry was focused on social affairs. After this, the ministry underwent several name changes as a result of transfers of responsibilities.

- 1 January 1903–1 December 1905: Ministry of Trade (Ministry of Foreign Affairs, Trade, Shipping and Industry)
- 1 December 1905–1 July 1913: Ministry of Trade (Ministry of Trade, Shipping and Industry)
- 1 July 1913–1 October 1916: Ministry of Social Affairs (Ministry of Social Affairs, Trade, Industry and Fisheries)
- 1 October 1916–6 December 1947: Ministry of Trade (Ministry of Trade, Shipping, Industry, Craft and Fisheries)
- 6 December 1947–1 January 1955: Ministry of Industry (Ministry of Industry, Craft and Shipping) (see Ministry of Trade and Shipping)
- 1 January 1955–1 January 1988: Ministry of Industry (Ministry of Industry and Craft)
- 1 January 1988–1 January 1993: Ministry of Industry
- 1 January 1993–1 January 1997: Ministry of Industry and Energy (see Ministry of Petroleum and Energy)
- 1 January 1997–31 December 2013: Ministry of Trade and Industry

== Organisation ==
=== Departments ===
The Ministry of Trade and Industry has six departments. The Press and Communications Division is part of the Secretary General's staff.

The Ministry is headed by the Minister of Trade and Industry. The other political staff consists of three State Secretaries and one Political Advisor.

The ministry is divided into the following sections:

- Information section
- Department of Planning, Administration and Economic affairs
- Department of Ownership
- Department of Trade and Industrial Economics
- Department of Research and Innovation Politics
- Department of Regulations and Shipping
- Department of Entrepreneurship and Internationalization

=== Subsidiaries ===
Subordinate government agencies:

- Brønnøysund Register Centre
- Guarantee Institute for Export Credits
- Norwegian Accreditation
- Norwegian Directorate of Mining with the Commissioner of Mines at Svalbard
- Norwegian Maritime Directorate
- Norwegian Metrology Service
- Norwegian Geological Survey
- Norwegian Patent Office
- Norwegian Ship Registers
- Norwegian Space Centre

Other agencies associated with the department:

- BEDIN
- Euro Info Centre
- Industrial Development Corporation of Norway
- Innovation Norway
- Master Craftsman Committee
- Norwegian Design Council
- Norwegian Export Credit Agency
- The Research Council of Norway
- Standards Norway

Wholly owned limited companies:

- Argentum Fondsinvesteringer
- BaneTele
- Bjørnøen
- Electronic Chart Centre
- Entra Eiendom
- Flytoget
- Innovation Norway
- Kings Bay
- Mesta
- Industrial Development Corporation of Norway
- Statkraft
- Venturefondet
- Store Norske Spitsbergen Kulkompani

Partially owned public limited companies:

- Telenor (54,0%)
- Kongsberg Gruppen (50,0%)
- Nammo (50,0%)
- Norsk Hydro (43,8%)
- Cermaq (43,5%)
- Yara International (36,2%)
- DnB NOR (34,0%)
- Aker Holding (30.0%, and thus indirectly 12% of Aker Kværner)
- Eksportfinans (15,0%)
- SAS Group (14,3%)

== See also ==
- Minister of Trade and Industry (Norway)
- Minister of Fisheries and Ocean Policy
