= Ministry of Fisheries and Coastal Affairs (Norway) =

Former government ministry of Norway

Royal Ministry of Fisheries and Coastal Affairs
- Fiskeri- og kystdepartementet

Agency overview
- Formed: 15 May 1946
- Dissolved: 31 December 2013
- Superseding agency: Ministry of Trade, Industry and Fisheries
- Jurisdiction: Government of Norway
- Headquarters: Grubbegata 1, Oslo, Norway
- Employees: 121 (2011)

Footnotes
- List of Norwegian ministries

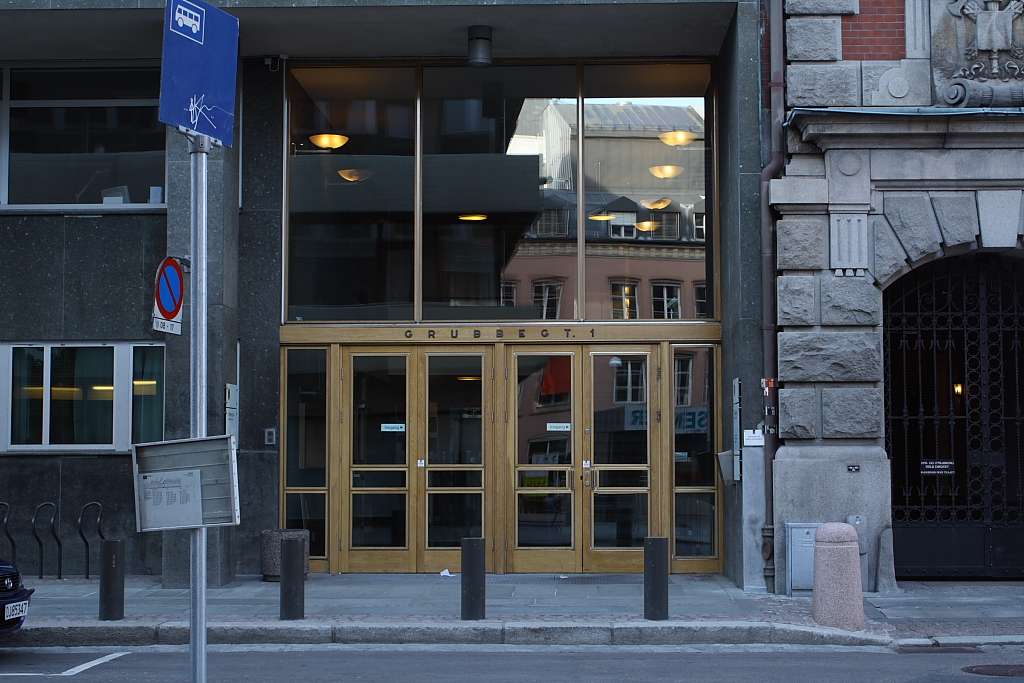
The Ministry of Fisheries and Coastal Affairs in Oslo

The Royal Norwegian Ministry of Fisheries and Coastal Affairs (Norwegian: Fiskeri- og kystdepartementet, FKD) was a Norwegian ministry responsible for fisheries industry, aquaculture industry, seafood safety, fish health and welfare, harbours, water transport infrastructure and emergency preparedness for pollution incidents.

It was created in 1946, as the Ministry of Fisheries. In 2004 it received responsibility for coastal affairs, and changed its name. The department must report to the legislature, Storting.

On 1 January 2014, the ministry was dissolved and the minister portfolio was incorporated into the new Ministry of Trade, Industry and Fisheries.

== Organisation ==
The ministry was divided into the following sections:

- Political staff
- Communication unit
- Department of Aquaculture, Seafood and Markets
- Department of Coastal Affairs
- Department of Research and Innovation
- Department of Marine Resources and Environment

=== Subsidiaries ===
Subordinate government agencies were:

- Institute of Marine Research
- Norwegian Coastal Administration
- National Institute of Nutrition and Seafood Research
- Norwegian Directorate of Fisheries

Wholly owned limited companies were:

- Norwegian Seafood Export Council

Partially owned limited companies were:

- Nofima, The Norwegian Institute of Food, Fisheries and Aquaculture Research
