= List of Norwegian ministries =

This is a list of Norwegian government ministries as of March 2024.

== Current ministries ==
English name	Norwegian name
Office of the Prime Minister	Statsministerens kontor
Ministry of Agriculture and Food	Landbruks- og matdepartementet
Ministry of Children and Families	Barne- og familiedepartementet
Ministry of Climate and Environment	Klima- og miljødepartementet
Ministry of Culture and Equality	Kultur- og likestillingsministeren
Ministry of Defence	Forsvarsdepartementet
Ministry of Education and Research	Kunnskapsdepartementet
Ministry of Finance	Finansdepartementet
Ministry of Foreign Affairs	Utenriksdepartementet
Ministry of Health and Care Services	Helse- og omsorgsdepartementet
Ministry of Justice and Public Security	Justis- og beredskapsdepartementet
Ministry of Labour and Social Inclusion	Arbeids- og inkluderingsdepartementet
Ministry of Local Government and Regional Development	Kommunal- og distriktsdepartementet
Ministry of Energy	Energidepartementet
Ministry of Trade, Industry and Fisheries	Nærings- og fiskeridepartementet
Ministry of Transport	Samferdselsdepartementet
Ministry of Digitalisation and Public Governance	Digitaliserings- og forvaltningsdepartementet

== Historical ministries ==
English name	Norwegian name	Period
Predecessors of the Ministry of Agriculture and Food
Ministry of Agriculture	Landbruksdepartementet	1900–2004
Predecessors of the Ministry of Children and Families
Ministry of Family and Consumer Affairs	Departementet for familie- og forbrukersaker	1956–1972
Ministry of Government Administration and Consumer Affairs	Forbruker- og administrasjonsdepartementet	1972–1990
Ministry of Family and Consumer Affairs	Familie- og forbrukerdepartementet	1990–1991
Ministry of Children and Family Affairs	Barne- og familiedepartementet	1991–2006
Ministry of Children and Equality	Barne- og likestillingsdepartementet	2006–2010
Ministry of Children, Equality and Social Inclusion	Barne- og familiedepartementet	2010–2016
Ministry of Children and Equality	Barne- og likestillingsdepartementet	2016–2019
Predecessors of the Ministry of Culture and Equality
Ministry of Culture and Science	Kultur- og vitenskapsdepartementet	1982–1990
Ministry of Church and Culture	Kirke- og kulturdepartementet	1990–1991
Ministry of Culture	Kulturdepartementet	1991–2002
Ministry of Culture and Church Affairs	Kirke- og kulturdepartementet	2002–2010
Ministry of Culture	Kulturdepartementet	2010–2021
Predecessors of the Ministry of Defence
6th Ministry	6. departement (krigsadministrasjonen)	1814–1815
Ministry of the Army	Armédepartementet	1815–1885
Predecessors of the Ministry of Education and Research
1st Ministry	1. departement (kirke- og undervisningssaker)	1814–1819
Ministry of Church Affairs and Education	Kirke- og undervisningsdepartementet	1819–1989
Ministry of Education and Research	Utdannings- og forskningsdepartementet	1990
Ministry of Church Affairs, Education and Research	Kirke-, utdannings- og forskningsdepartementet	1991–2001
Ministry of Education and Research	Utdannings- og forskningsdepartementet	2002–2006
Predecessors of the Ministry of Climate and Environment
Ministry of the Environment	Miljøverndepartementet	1972–2014
Predecessors of the Ministry of Finance
1st Ministry	1. departement (finansvesenet)	March 1814–November 1814
5th Ministry	5. departement (finanssaker)	November 1814–1818
Ministry of Finance, Trade and Customs	Departementet for finans-, handels- og tollvesenet	1818–1846
Ministry of Finance, Trade and Customs	Finans- og tolldepartementet	1846–1999
Predecessors of the Ministry of Foreign Affairs
none
Predecessors of the Ministry of Health and Care Services
Ministry of Health	Helsedepartementet	2002–2004
Predecessors of the Ministry of Justice and Public Security
3rd Ministry	3. departement (justissaker)	March 1814–November 1814
2nd Ministry	2. departement (justissaker)	November 1814–1818
Ministry of Justice and the Police	Justis- og politidepartementet	1818–2012
Predecessors of the Ministry of Labour and Social Inclusion
Ministry of the Interior	Departementet for det indre	1846–1903
Ministry of Trade	Departementet for utenrikske saker, handel, sjøfart og industri Departementet for handel, sjøfart og industri	1903–1905; 1905–1913
Ministry of Social Affairs	Departementet for sosiale saker, handel, industri og fiskeri Departementet for sosiale saker	1913–1916; 1916–1992
Ministry of Social Affairs (Social Affairs)	Sosialdepartementet (sosialsaker)	1992–1993
Ministry of Health and Social Affairs (Social Affairs)	Sosial- og helsedepartementet (sosialsaker)	1993–2001
Ministry of Social Affairs	Sosialdepartementet	2002–2004
Ministry of Labour and Social Affairs	Arbeids- og sosialdepartementet	2004–2006
Ministry of Labour and Social Inclusion	Arbeids- og sosialdepartementet	2006–2009
Ministry of Labour	Arbeidsdepartementet	2010–2013
Ministry of Labour and Social Affairs	Arbeids- og sosialdepartementet	2014–2021
Predecessors of the Ministry of Local Government and Regional Development
Ministry of Local Government and Labour	Kommunal- og arbeidsdepartementet	1948–1989
Ministry of Local Government	Kommunaldepartementet	1990–1992
Ministry of Local Government and Labour	Kommunal- og arbeidsdepartementet	1993–1997
Ministry of Local Government and Regional Development	Kommunal- og regionaldepartementet	1998–2013
Ministry of Local Government and Modernisation	Kommunal- og moderniseringsdepartementet	2014–2021
Predecessors of the Ministry of Petroleum and Energy
none
Predecessors of the Ministry of Trade, Industry and Fisheries
Ministry of Trade	Departementet for handel, sjøfart, industri, håndverk og fiskeri	1916–1947
Ministry of Industry	Industridepartementet	1947–1987
Ministry of Industry	Næringsdepartementet	1988–1993
Ministry of Industry and Energy	Nærings- og energidepartementet	1993–1997
Ministry of Trade and Industry	Nærings- og handelsdepartementet	1997–2013
Ministry of Fisheries	Fiskeridepartementet	1946–2004
Ministry of Fisheries and Coastal Affairs	Fiskeri- og kystdepartementet	2004–2013
Predecessors of the Ministry of Transport and Communications
Ministry of Labour	Departementet for offentlige arbeider	1885–1946
Other
Ministry of Auditing	Revisjonsdepartementet	1822–1918
Ministry of Provisioning	Provianteringsdepartementet	1916–1922
Ministry of Industrial Provisioning	Industriforsyningsdepartementet	1917–1920
Ministry of Provisioning and Reconstruction (named Ministry of Provisioning 1939–1942)	Forsynings- og gjenreisningsdepartementet (Forsyningsdepartementet 1939–1942)	1939–1950
Ministry of Culture and Enlightenment	Kultur- og folkeopplysningsdepartementet	1940–1945
Ministry of Shipping	Skipsfartsdepartementet	1942–1945
Ministry of Trade and Shipping	Handels- og skipsfartsdepartementet	1947–1987
Ministry of Government Administration and Labour	Arbeids- og administrasjonsdepartementet	1990–1993
Ministry of Government Administration	Administrasjonsdepartementet	1993–1996
Ministry of Planning and Coordination	Planleggings- og samordningsdepartementet	1997
Ministry of Government Administration and Labour	Arbeids- og administrasjonsdepartementet	1998–2004
Ministry of Modernisation	Moderniseringsdepartementet	2004–2006
Ministry of Government Administration and Reform	Fornyings- og administrasjonsdepartementet	2006–2010
Ministry of Government Administration, Reform and Church Affairs	Fornyings-, administrasjons- og kirkedepartementet	2010–2014
