= Enova SF =

- Company type: State owned
- Industry: Energy efficiency
- Founded: 2001
- Headquarters: Trondheim, Norway
- Area served: Norway
- Key people: Nils Kristian Nakstad (CEO); Jørn Rattsø (Chairman)
- Owner: Norwegian Ministry of Climate and Environment
- Number of employees: 142 (2026)
- Website: www.enova.no

Enova SF is a Norwegian government enterprise responsible for promotion of environmentally friendly production and consumption of energy. Its stated purpose is to explore new sources of clean energy, reduce overall energy consumption, and to provide educational materials to the public promoting energy-efficient practices. Established in 2001, it is financed through government funding in addition to a tariff of 1 øre per kWh of electricity to consumers. The company is owned by the Norwegian Ministry of Climate and Environment and based in Trondheim.
