= Ministry of Labour and Social Inclusion =

Government ministry of Norway

Royal Ministry of Labour and Social Inclusion
- Det kongelige arbeids- og inkluderingsdepartementet

Agency overview
- Formed: 1 January 1846; 180 years ago
- Jurisdiction: Government of Norway
- Headquarters: Regjeringskvartalet, Akersgata 64, Oslo, Norway
- Minister responsible: Marte Mjøs Persen, Minister of Labour and Social Inclusion
- Agency executive: Eli Telhaug, Secretary General
- Website: Official website

Footnotes
- List of Norwegian ministries

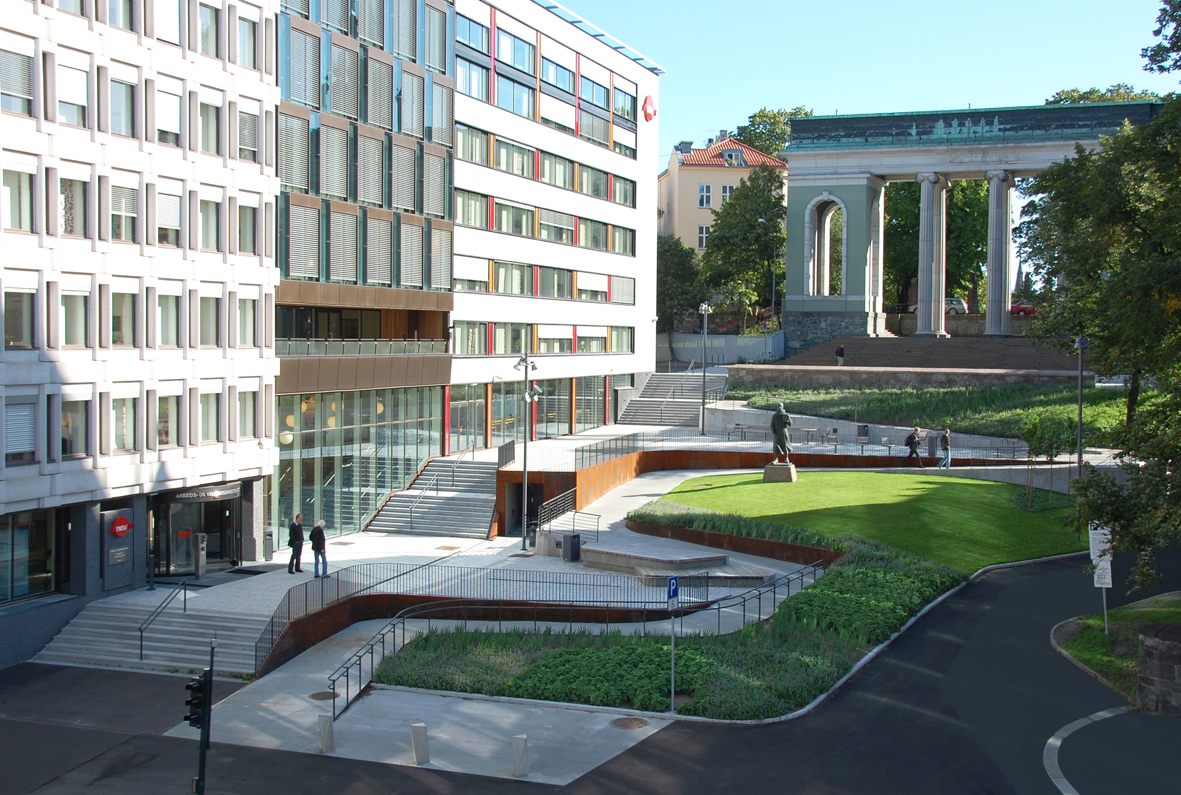
The office of Ministry of Labour and Social Inclusion in Oslo

The Royal Norwegian Ministry of Labour and Social Inclusion (Norwegian: Arbeids- og inkluderingsdepartementet, AID) is a Norwegian ministry established in 1846. It is responsible for the labour market, the working environment, pensions, welfare, social security, integration, immigration and asylum. Since 2023 the ministry has been led by Tonje Brenna of the Labour Party.

== Name history ==
The ministry was originally established as Ministry of the Interior in 1846. It has since seen changes to its nomenclature, which highlighted its responsibility on social affairs in 1916.

- 1 January 1846–31 December 1902: Ministry of the Interior
- 1 January 1903–1 December 1905: Ministry of Foreign Affairs, Trade, Shipping and Industry (Trade)
- 1 December 1905–30 June 1913: Ministry of Trade, Shipping and Industry (Trade)
- 1 July 1913–30 September 1916: Ministry of Social Affairs, Trade Industry and Fisheries (Social Affairs)
- 1 October 1916–7 November 1993: Ministry of Social Affairs
- 8 November 1993–31 December 2001: Ministry of Health and Social Affairs
- 1 January 2002–1 October 2004: Ministry of Social Affairs
- 1 October 2004–31 December 2005: Ministry of Labour and Social Affairs
- 1 January 2006–31 December 2009: Ministry of Labour and Social Inclusion
- 1 January 2010–31 December 2013: Ministry of Labour
- 1 January 2014–31 December 2021: Ministry of Labour and Social Affairs
- 1 January 2022–: Ministry of Labour and Social Inclusion

Responsibility for labour affairs were transferred to the Ministry of Local Government in 1948, where it was until 1989 and again from 1993 to 1997. The responsibilities were returned to social affairs in 2002, and inclusion was added to the title in 2006.

- 1 September 1885–22 February 1946: Ministry of Labour
- 20 December 1948–31 December 1989: Ministry of Local Government and Labour (see Ministry of Local Government and Regional Development)
- 1 January 1990–1 January 1993: Ministry of Government Administration and Labour
- 1 January 1993–31 December 1997: Ministry of Local Government and Labour
- 1 January 1998–1 October 2004: Ministry of Labour and Government Administration (see Ministry of Government Administration, Reform and Church Affairs)

== Organisation ==
=== Political staff ===
As of October 2023, the political staff of the ministry is as follows:

- Minister Tonje Brenna (Labour Party)
- State Secretary Tomas Norvoll (Labour Party)
- State Secretary Kjetil Vevle (Labour Party)
- State Secretary Ellen Bakke (Labour Party)
- Political adviser Herman Høgby Robertsen (Labour Party)

=== Subsidiaries ===
==== Agencies ====
- Arbeids- og velferdsetaten (Norwegian Labour and Welfare Service) — Administers age- and disability pensions and other welfare and manages unemployment.
- Arbeids- og velferdsdirektoratet (Norwegian Directorate of Labour and Welfare) — Manages the Norwegian Labour and Welfare Service.
- Arbeidsretten (Labour Court of Norway) — Court that takes under consideration disputes about validity, interpretation and existence of collective agreements, questions regarding breach of collective agreements, questions regarding breach of the peace obligation, and claims for damages resulting from such breaches.
- Arbeidstilsynet (Norwegian Labour Inspection Authority) — Authority aimed at occupational health and safety.
- Pensjonstrygden for sjømenn (Norwegian Pension Insurance for Seamen) — Administers the seamen's pension.
- Petroleumstilsynet (Petroleum Safety Authority Norway) — Ensures occupational safety and health in the petroleum industry.
- Riksmekleren (State Conciliator of Norway) — Negotiates wage and tariff disputes between employer and labour unions.
- Statens arbeidsmiljøinstitutt (National Institute of Occupational Health) — Research.
- Statens pensjonskasse (Norwegian Public Service Pension Fund)

==== Standing Committees and Boards ====
- Rikslønnsnemnda (National Wages Board)
- Tariffnemnda (Collective Bargaining Board)

==== Limited companies ====
- Rehabil, rehabilitation workplace

== See also ==
- Minister of Labour and Social Inclusion
