= Staur Farm =

Norwegian state owned farm in Stange, Norway

Staur Gård AS
- Logo of Staur Gård AS

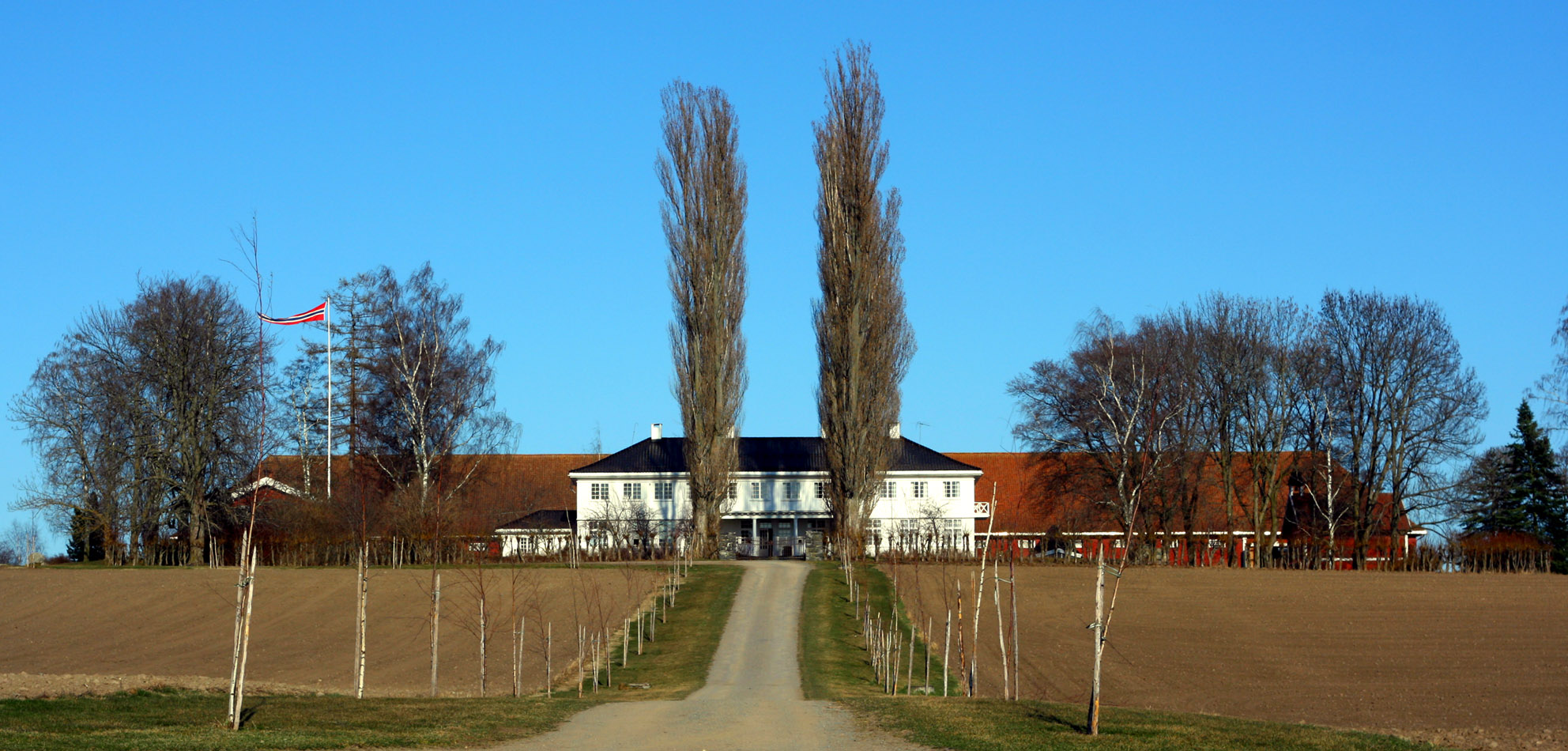
- Staur Farm in April 2007
- Company type: State-owned
- Industry: Research
- Headquarters: Stange Municipality, Norway
- Owner: Norwegian Ministry of Agriculture and Food

Staur Farm (Norwegian: Staur Gård) is a farm located in Stange Municipality in Innlandet county, Norway. It is owned by the Norwegian Ministry of Agriculture and Food, and operates both a facility for agricultural research, as well as a conference hotel in the mansion. The farm has 100 hectares (250 acres) of fields. The research is conducted by Graminor, Norsk Kjøttfeavlslag, Geno and Nortura. The conference hotel has been used by the government of Norway for an annual, important planning conference.
