= Bjørnøen =

Norwegian government enterprise

Bjørnøen AS
- Type: State owned
- Industry: Real estate
- Founded: 1918
- Headquarters: Ny-Ålesund, Norway
- Area served: Bjørnøya
- Revenue: ▲NOK 213,000 (2005)
- Number of employees: 0 (2007)
- Parent: Norwegian Ministry of Trade and Industry

Bjørnøen AS is a Norwegian government enterprise that owns all land and some heritage buildings on the uninhabited overseas territory of Bjørnøya (Bear Island).

The company was founded as I/S Bjørnøen Kulkompani on June 3, 1918 to perform coal mining on Bjørnøya (the Bjørnøen spelling is the Danish-based 19th century Norwegian spelling of Bjørnøya). It was nationalized in 1932 and became a subsidiary of Kings Bay in 1967. The company is managed by Kings Bay AS. It is owned by the Norwegian Ministry of Trade and Industry, which owns the company as part of a strategy to claim sovereignty of the island. Kings Bay is responsible for the administration of the company, financed through the ordinary state subsidies to Kings Bay. The company has the same board of directors and managing director as Kings Bay. The Norwegian Meteorological Institute rents some land for a meteorological station on the island. They are also responsible for coordinating any scientific activities on the island, that (with a few exceptions) became the Bjørnøya nature reserve (Bjørnøya naturreservat) on August 16, 2002.
