= Statsforetak =

Type of company in Norway

Statsforetak or SF, meaning State Enterprise is a type of company in Norway. SFs are wholly owned by the Government of Norway, but it does not hold unlimited liability in the company. The government is free to convert any aksjeselskap (limited company) that it owns, or any other assets, to an SF, without approval by other parties.

The companies do have a board of directors and a managing director. The board must have at least three members; five if there is employee representation. The managing director can not sit on the board. All SFs must have an auditor.

== History ==
The SF was created by the State Enterprise Act of August 30, 1991 (#71). Initially there were few SFs, but gradually there were created more, mainly by converting government agencies to SFs. During the 2000s the Conservative/Christian Democrat/Liberal government converted some of the SFs to limited companies, including Statkraft (the state power company).

Some Statsforetaks:

- Gassnova
- Enova SF
- SIVA SF
- Statnett SF
- Statskog SF
- Bane NOR SF
