= Argentum Fondsinvesteringer =

Norwegian government enterprise

Argentum Fondsinvesteringer AS
- Company type: State owned
- Industry: Private Equity
- Founded: 2001
- Headquarters: Bergen, Norway
- Area served: Norway
- Key people: Joachim Høegh-Krohn (CEO)
- Revenue: ▲NOK 396 million (2005)
- Operating income: NOK 309 million (2005)
- Net income: NOK 389 million (2005)
- Number of employees: 11 (2007)
- Parent: Norwegian Ministry of Trade and Industry
- Website: www.argentum.no

Argentum previous logo

Argentum Fondsinvesteringer is a Norwegian government enterprise that participates as a minority owner in private equity funds. The goal of the company is to stimulate to create private equity investment groups in Norway, develop high research competence and to receive high return of capital from investments. The company is based in Bergen and is owned by the Ministry of Trade and Industry. It was founded in 2001.

Per 2010, the company had 16 employees.
