= Ministry of Agriculture and Food (Norway) =

Government ministry of Norway

- Landbruks- og matdepartementet

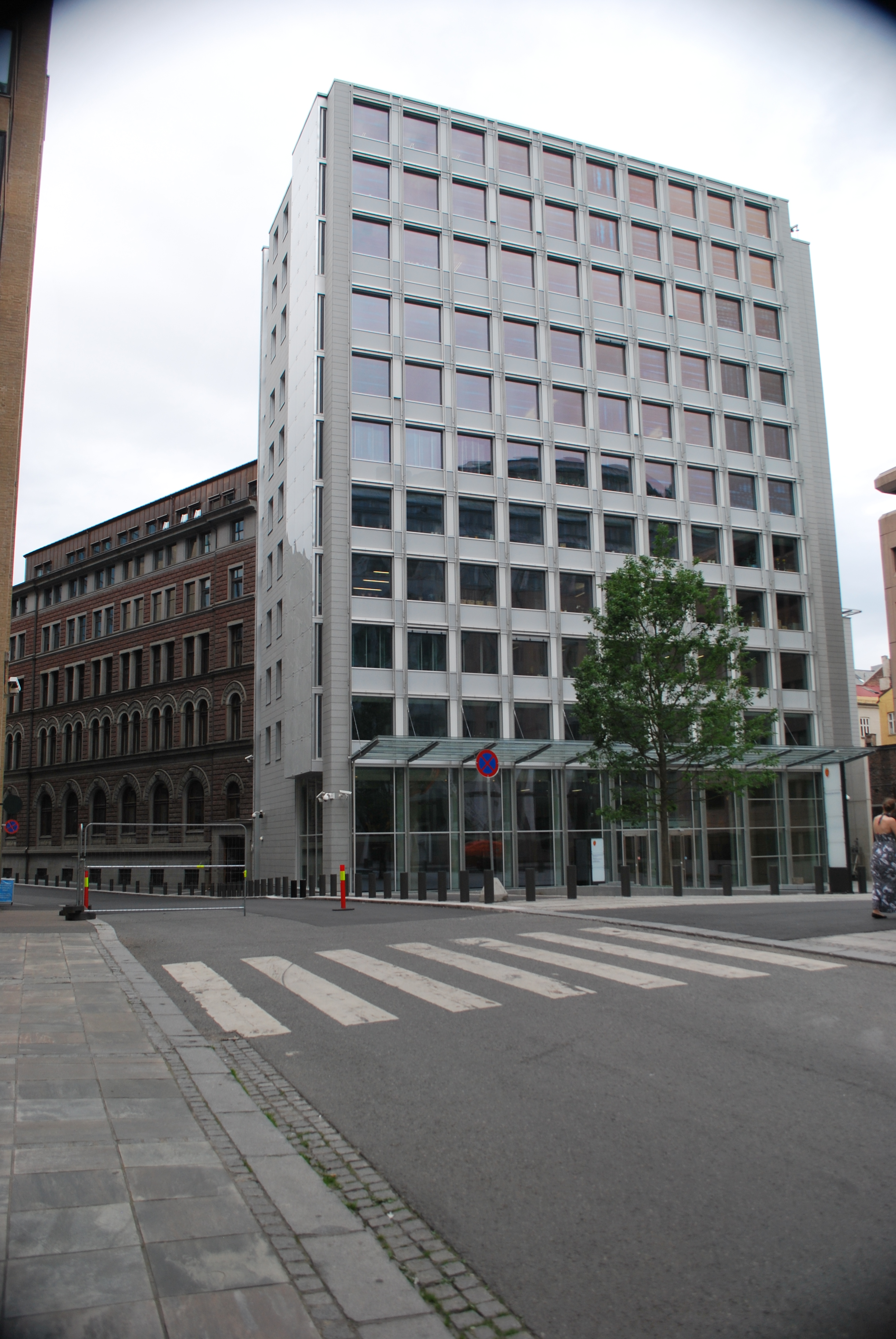

Agency overview
- Formed: 17 February 1900
- Jurisdiction: Government of Norway
- Headquarters: Oslo
- Employees: 190
- Minister responsible: Olaug Bollestad (Christian Democratic)
- Website: www.government.no

The Royal Norwegian Ministry of Agriculture and Food (Norwegian: Landbruks- og matdepartementet) is a Norwegian ministry established on 17 February 1900, and is responsible for agriculture, forestry and food in Norway. It is since January 2019 led by Minister of Agriculture and Food Olaug Bollestad (Christian Democratic). The department reports to the parliament (Stortinget).

The ministry primarily regulates food production by setting quotas for farmers and works in cooperation with the Norwegian Food Safety Authority on food safety measures. It is also responsible for managing forestry and administering agricultural subsidies.

== Organisation ==
The ministry is divided into the following sections:

- Political staff
- Communication unit
- Department of Administrative and Economic Affairs
- Department of Forest- and Natural Resource Policy
- Department of Food Policy
- Department of Agricultural Policy
- Department of Research, Innovation and Regional Policy

=== Political staff ===
- Minister Sylvi Listhaug (Progress Party)
- State Secretary Hanne Blåfjelldal (Progress Party)

=== Subsidiaries ===
Under the ministry there are four administrative agencies and two state-owned companies:

- County Governor, or Fylkesmannen (official site) Regional authority of the Government, with a Governor in each of 18 counties.
- Norwegian Agriculture Authority, or Statens landbruksforvaltning (official site) Authority for the agriculture industry.
- Norwegian Food Safety Authority, or Mattilsynet (official site) Controls all aspects of food safety, including agriculture, import and trade.
- Reindeer Husbandry Administration, or Reindriftforvaltningen (official site) Authority for the reindeer husbandry industry.

State enterprises:

- Statskog (official site) Manages the state owned forests and natural property.

Limited companies:

- Staur Farm, or Staur Gård (official site) A farm.
