= National Institute of Occupational Health =

Norwegian government agency

National Institute of Occupational Health, also known as Statens arbeidsmiljøinstitutt or STAMI, is a government body organised by the Norwegian Ministry of Labour and Social Inclusion. The institute deals with a range of occupational health areas, with staff with competence in medicine, physiology, chemistry, biology, psychology, and other disciplines. The institute deals with all aspects of Norwegian working life, and works in both environmental and health fields, and often visits workplaces to look into their health practices. The institute has an occupational health clinic which treats patients with work related illnesses. This is also used to train health professionals and other students.

== Sections ==
The National Institute of Occupational Health is split into six sections:

- Information, libraries, and learning
- Administration
- Work medicine
- Work physiology
- Toxicology
- Work hygiene
