= Mesta (company) =

Norwegian company focused on construction

Mesta AS
- Company type: State owned
- Industry: Construction; Civil engineering
- Founded: 2003
- Headquarters: Oslo, Norway
- Area served: Norway
- Key people: Marianne Bergmann Røren
- Revenue: ▲NOK 5,939 million (2006)
- Operating income: NOK -312 million (2006)
- Net income: NOK -190 million (2006)
- Number of employees: 3 237 (2006)
- Parent: Norwegian Ministry of Trade and Industry
- Website: www.mesta.no

Mesta AS is a Norwegian government enterprise delivering services within construction and civil engineering of roads. The company is owned by the Norwegian Ministry of Trade and Industry and has its headquarters at Skøyen, Oslo. Marianne Bergmann Røren is the Chief Executive Officer of Mesta AS.

The company was created in 2003 when the construction division of Statens Vegvesen was demerged to become a separate limited company that has to compete for each contract. During the summer of 2008 the company experienced a restructuring of the entire organizational structure. The company now consists of eight fully owned subsidiaries: Geo Survey, Eiendom (Property), Entreprenør (Entrepreneur), Asfalt (Asphalt), Stein (Rock), Elektro (Electro), Drift (Operation), and Verksted (Maintenance). The corporate HQ is positioned in Oslo. The subsidiaries are structured as own entities and are limited companies.
