= Statskog =

Statskog SF
- Company type: State owned
- Industry: Real estate
- Founded: 1860
- Headquarters: Namsos, Norway
- Area served: Norway
- Key people: Øistein Aagesen (CEO)
- Revenue: ▲NOK 237 million (2004)
- Operating income: NOK 25 million (2004)
- Net income: NOK 26 million (2004)
- Number of employees: 161 (2006)
- Parent: Norwegian Ministry of Agriculture and Food
- Website: www.statskog.no

Statskog is a Norwegian state-owned enterprise responsible for the management of state-owned forest and mountain real estate totaling approximately 20% of the area of Norway. About 5% of Statskog's land is productive forest while 80% is above the tree line. The company has its headquarters in Namsos.

In southern Norway the operations of productive forestry is conducted by Statskog-Borregaard Skogsdrift AS, a joint venture between Statskog and Borregaard. Across the country Statskog also manages hunting licences and allows for travel and tourism in nature.

== History ==
Emblem of the Norwegian Directorate of the State Forests

Statskog was established in 1860 as Statens skovvæsen and was organized under the Ministry of the Interior. In 1957 it was separated from the Ministry of Agriculture under the name Direktoratet for statens skoger. It changed its name and underwent reorganisation in 1992–1993, and the head office was moved from Oslo to Namsos. While it presently owns a fifth of the land of Norway, until July 1, 2006, it owned a third. As of that day all properties in Finnmark (a total of 95% of the land in the county) were transferred to the Finnmark Estate. Between 300,000 and 400,000 cubic meters are felled annually in Statskog-owned forests by hired contractors. The timber is then used for a variety of commercial purposes. Statskog is certified according to ISO 14001, which pertains to the appropriate management of forests. Recently, the company has begun offering a range of tourist-oriented services designed to attract visitors to the various properties across the country, including national parks such as Reisa National Park. Cabin rentals are available online and feature a range of accommodation options.
