= Steinar Stjernø =

Norwegian academic (born 1945)

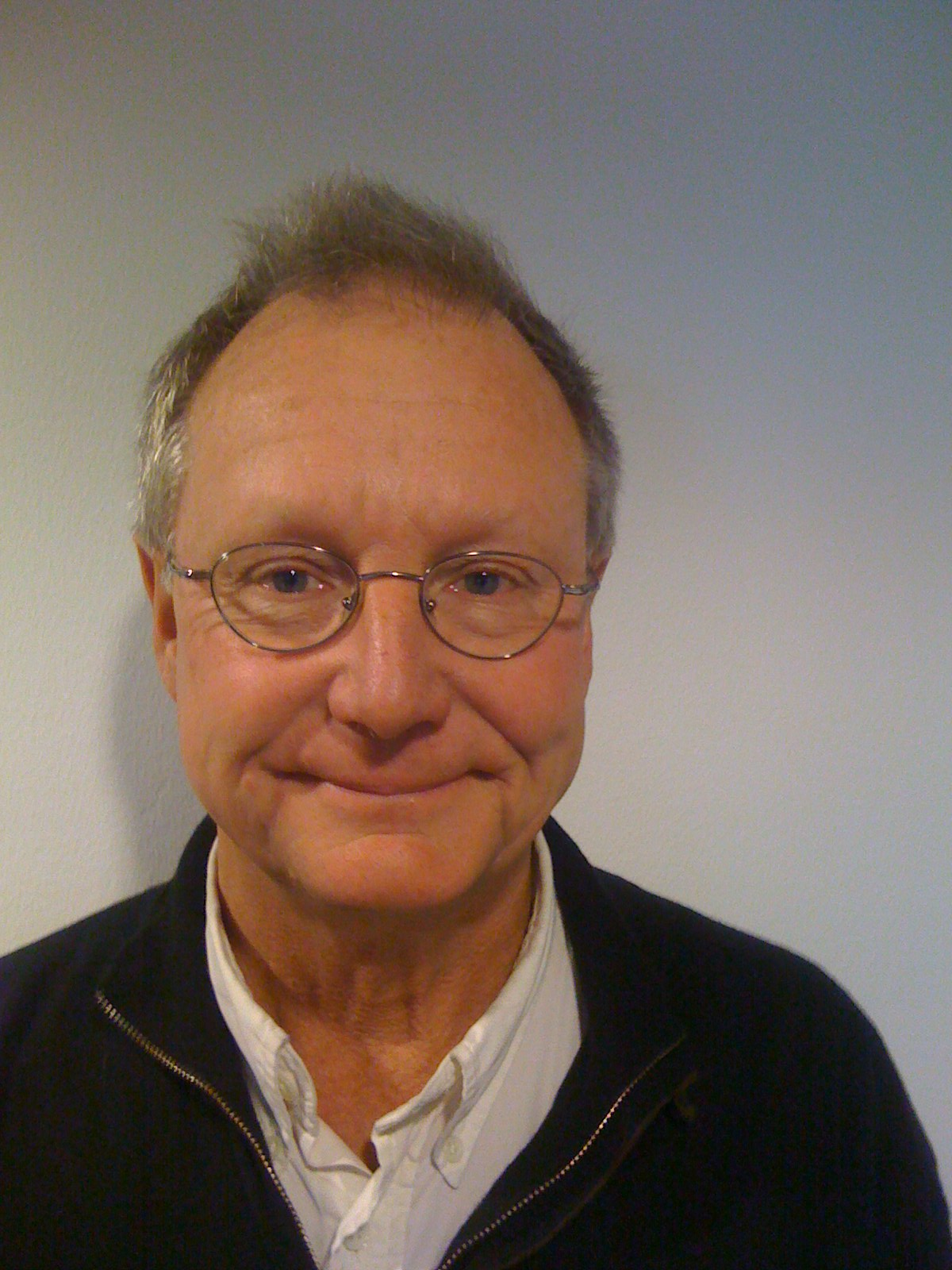
- Born: 10 January 1945
- Citizenship: Norwegian
- Education: University of Bergen
- Scientific career
- Fields: social policy studies social work
- Workplaces: Oslo University College

Steinar Stjernø (born 10 January 1945) is a Norwegian academic.

He obtained the mag.art. degree (PhD equivalent) in Public Administration and Organizational Theory from the University of Bergen in 1971. He worked as a researcher at the Norwegian State College of Local Government Administration and Social Work from 1971 to 1978, and later as associate professor. He was the rector from 1987 to 1991. When the Oslo University College was established in 1994 through a merger, Stjernø became the rector there, a position he held until 2000. Since 2002 he is professor at the same institution, of social policy studies and social work. He has been a visiting scholar at the University of Bremen, the University of New South Wales and the University of California, Berkeley.

Stjernø was a member of the board of the Council of University Colleges in Norway from 1995 to 2000. In 2007 and 2008 he chaired the board of the Norwegian Work Research Institute.

He has been active in the Socialist Left Party, having been its deputy leader from 1975 to 1977. He is a member of Ullern borough council.

Academic offices
Preceded by position created	Rector of Oslo University College; 1994–2000	Succeeded by Per Lilleengen
