= Electronic Chart Centre =

Norwegian government enterprise

Electronic Chart Centre AS
- Type: State owned
- Industry: Charts
- Founded: 1999
- Headquarters: Stavanger, Norway
- Area served: Scandinavia
- Key people: Kirsten E. Bøe
- Products: NaVida
- Number of employees: 20 (2022)
- Parent: Ministry of Local Government and District
- Website: www.ecc.no

Electronic Chart Centre AS is Norwegian government enterprise created in 1999 to create and publish nautical charts for use by ships and boats. The company was originally part of Statens Kartverk The Electronic Chart Centre is based in Stavanger and has 15 employees. ECC AS is responsible for the technical operation PRIMAR ENC service in cooperation with Statens Kartverk - sjø.

== History ==
The industrial development in the 1980s resulted in the development of new digital equipment for the integration of chart data and NavStar GPS (Global Positioning System). The concept allowed navigators to see their own vessels in real-time motion on a computer screen, and should thus revolutionise ship navigation. Under the leadership of the Norwegian Mapping Authority (a division of the Norwegian Mapping Authority), both were initiated international and national projects with participation from several nautical charts, public maritime authorities, industry and The Norwegian Veritas (Det norske Veritas). The goal was to gain knowledge and experience for future development of international standards for map data and navigation equipment, through operational trials on ships in international traffic. This work was led by Asbjørn Kyrkjeeide, employed by the Norwegian Mapping Authority. The results from the projects were available in 1991, and formed the basis for a further work with an international standard for authorized electronic chart data (ENC) and an international standard for electronic chart machines (EDCIS). The work with the latter standard was led by Øivind Stene, at that time head of the Norwegian Mapping Authority at Sea (Sjøkartverket), and later head of the Norwegian Mapping Authority (Kartverket).

Norway, through Robert Sandvik (CEO of ECC 2011 - 2014), then led the work of developing an international encryption standard for ENC. This is still used by nautical charters, shipping and the maritime industry worldwide. As a follow-up to the projects, the international electronic chart activity in Norway
