= Gassnova =

Norwegian state enterprise

Gassnova SF is the Norwegian state enterprise for carbon capture and storage. Gassnova facilitates the development of technology and solutions to ensure cost-efficient and progressive solutions for capturing and storing CO_{2}.

== State enterprise ==
Gassnova was established by the Norwegian authorities in 2005 to further the development of technologies and knowledge related to carbon capture and storage (CCS) and, in addition to this, serve as the government's adviser on this issue. Gassnova is tasked with administrating the research and financing program, CLIMIT, and ensuring the testing and development of CCS technologies at the Technology Center Mongstad (TCM). CLIMIT and TCM are central elements in the work to realize Europe's first industrial-scale carbon capture and storage project, now named Longship CCS.
