= Innovation Norway =

Norwegian government agency

Innovation Norway (Norwegian: Innovasjon Norge) is a state-owned company and a national development bank.

The company's programs and services are intended to stimulate entrepreneurship in Norway. Its head office is in Oslo, and it has offices in each of the Norwegian counties. It also has offices in 30 countries around the world. The company has over 500 employees worldwide and has supported maritime transportation, biotechnology, thin film, and alternative fuel.

== History ==
Innovation Norway was formed in 2004 through the merger of the Norwegian Tourist Board, the Norwegian Trade Council, the Norwegian Industrial and Regional Development Fund (SND) and the Government Consultative Office for Inventors (SVO).

== The “Sommarøy” controversy ==
In the summer of 2019, Innovation Norway was involved in the production of a spoof news story about the island of Sommarøy in Troms. The story claimed that due to long days in the summer and long nights during winter, inhabitants didn't have the need to follow international conventions of time. The aim of the spoof news story was to advertise Northern Norway. The advert was originally presented as a legitimate news story, and its multiple false claims were only discovered after the story had been disseminated worldwide. The company was strongly criticized for their promotional strategy. Innovation Norway has since issued an apology, regretting their lack of transparency and vowing to scrutinize their routines.

== See also ==
- List of national development banks
