= Etat =

Etat (pl. etater) is a Norwegian state, county or municipal agency. An etat is a subdivision of the administration which has been given responsibility for a special area. An agency does not have a board of directors, but it does have a director, appointed by the subordinate organization. Normally decisions made by the agency can be appealed to the higher body. State agencies are subordinate to one particular ministry, and appeals are made to the Minister.

As part of the parliamentary oversight and supervisory activities, Parliament has four independent agencies: the Auditor General of Norway, the Parliamentary Commissioner for the Armed Forces, the Parliamentary Ombudsman (for Public Affairs), and the Parliamentary Intelligence Oversight Committee.

Government agencies are often given names ending in directorate, inspectorate, administration (verk) or authority. Among the organisations organised as agencies are the universities and colleges. All government agencies are audited by the Office of the Auditor General of Norway. Municipalities and counties often divide their organization into etater, with only the central administration left in the core. Typically these agencies then are responsible for schools, healthcare, culture, etc.

== Privatization ==
There has been a tendency, especially among right-wing politicians, to convert some agencies to limited companies or state enterprises (or their county/municipal equivalent). Some have even been privatized. One such example of converting agencies to enterprises is that all the hospitals are organised as health trusts, owned again by four regional health authorities.
