= List of University of the Arctic members =

In 2023, there were 185 member institutions of UArctic, most of which are educational institutions and most of which are from the Arctic states (listed below). In addition, there are 50 members from non-Arctic states.

== Canada ==
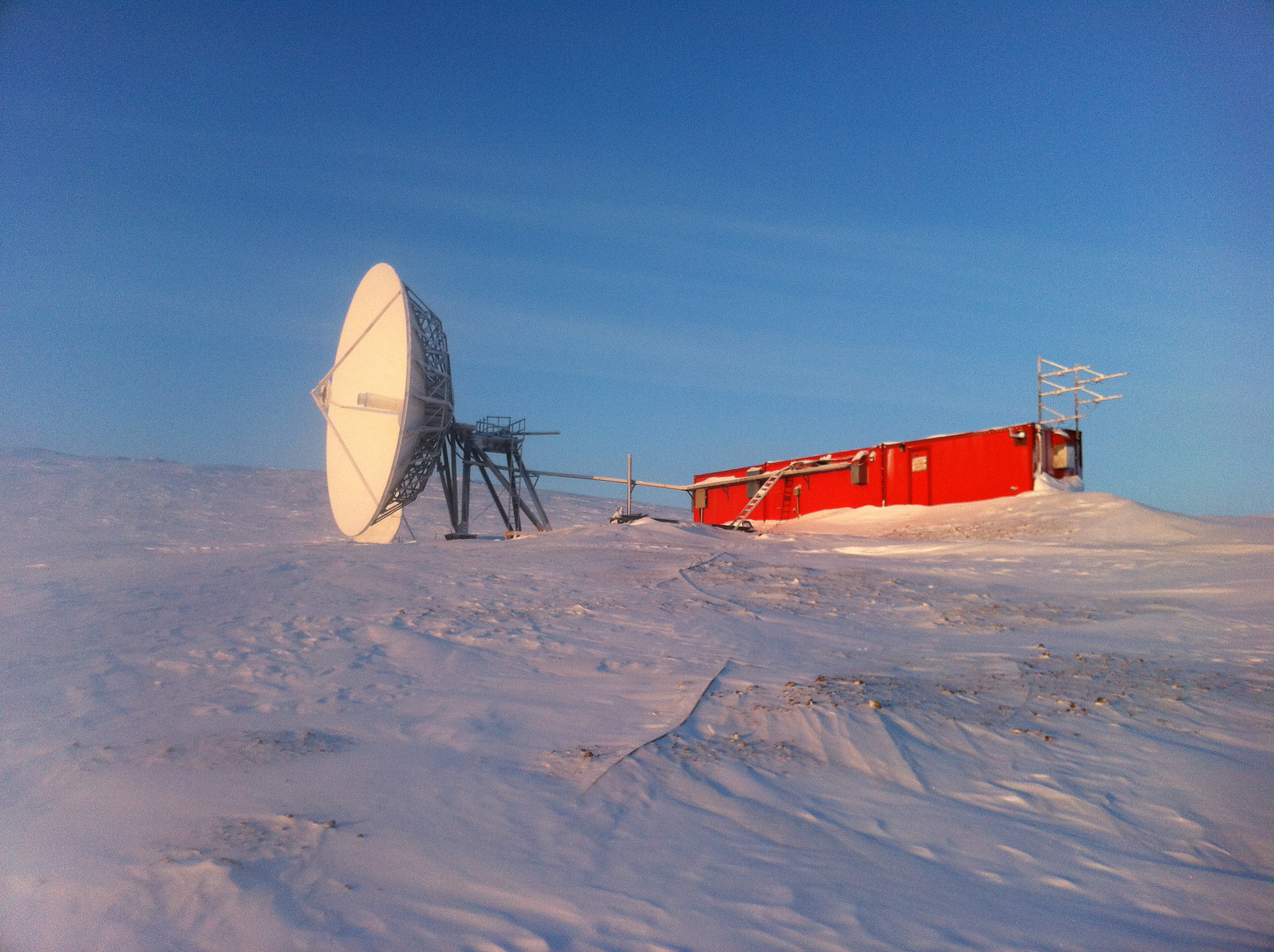
Eureka Research Base, Nunavut, Canada

- Arctic Athabaskan Council
- Arctic Institute of North America
- Association of Canadian Universities for Northern Studies
- Aurora College
- Brandon University
- Cape Breton University
- Carleton University
- Centre d’études nordiques (Centre for Northern studies)
- Gwich'in Council International
- Lakehead University
- Makivik Corporation
- McGill University
- Memorial University of Newfoundland
- Northlands College
- Nunavut Arctic College
- Nunavut Sivuniksavut
- Polar Libraries Colloquy
- Qaujigiartiit Health Research Centre
- Royal Military College of Canada
- Royal Roads University
- Saint Mary's University
- TELUS World of Science - Edmonton
- Trent University
- Université du Québec à Montréal
- Université du Québec à Rimouski
- Université Laval
- University College of the North
- University of Alberta
- University of Northern British Columbia
- University of Regina
- University of Saskatchewan
- University of Toronto
- University of Winnipeg
- Vancouver Island University
- Wilp Wilxo'oskwhl Nisga'a Institute
- Yukon University

== Denmark ==
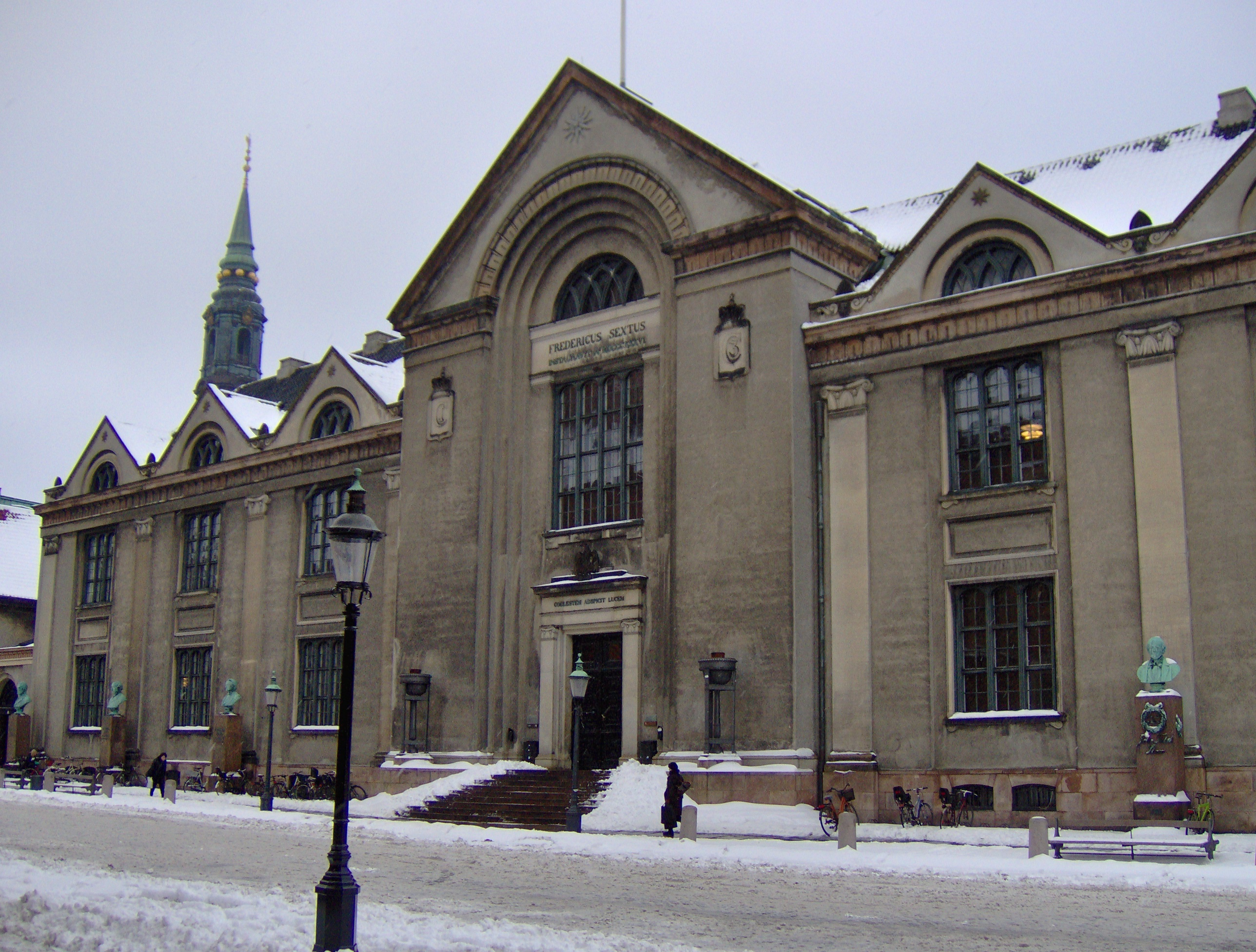
University of Copenhagen, Denmark

- Aalborg University
- Aarhus University
- Arctic Technology Centre - Technical University of Denmark
- Copenhagen Business School
- Department of Environmental and Business Economics - University of Southern Denmark
- Nordisk Fond for Miljø og Udvikling
- Roskilde University
- University of Copenhagen
- University College Copenhagen

== Greenland ==
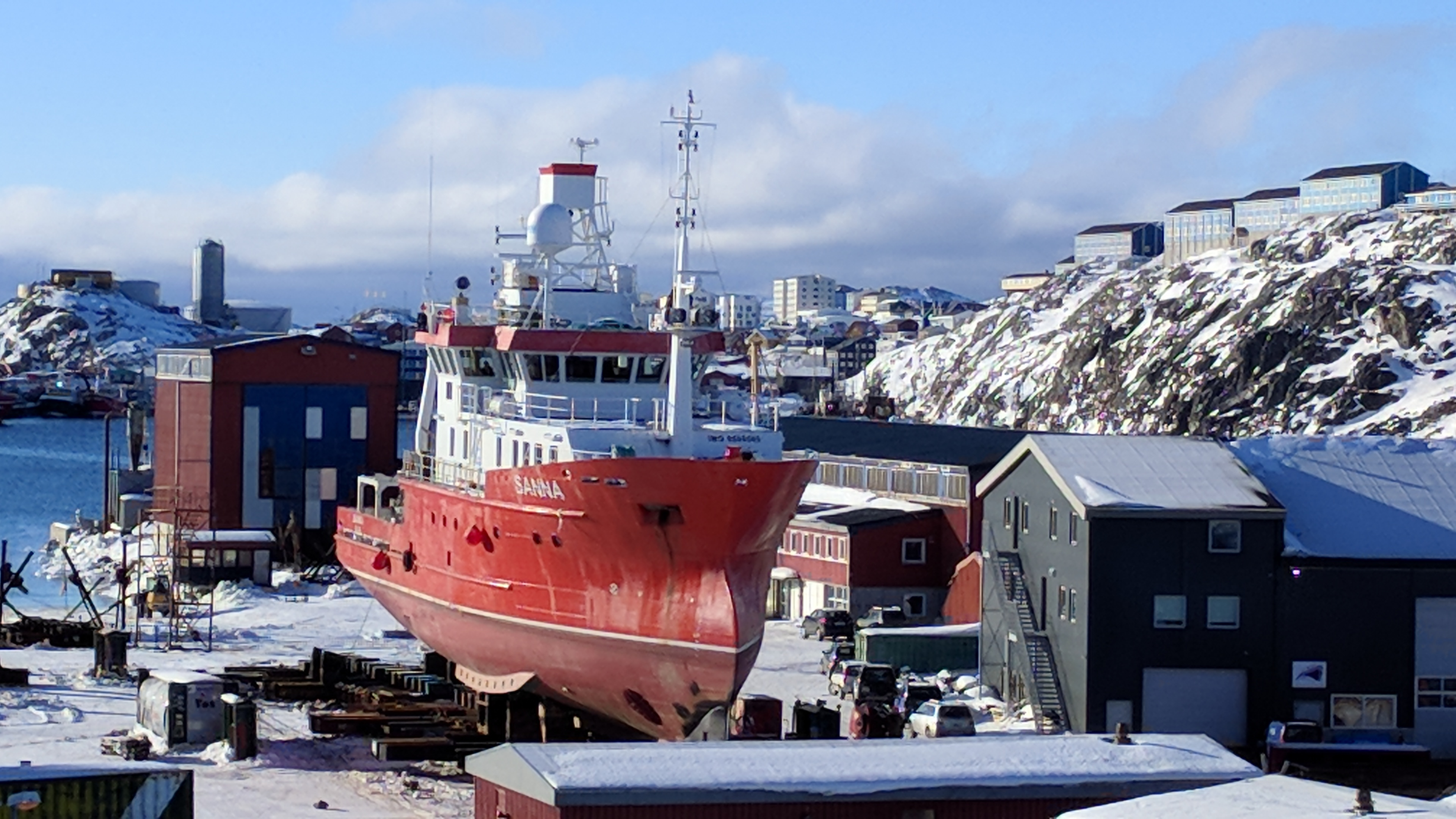
Greenland Institute of Natural Resources research vessel SANNA

- Greenland Institute of Natural Resources
- Ilisimatusarfik / University of Greenland
- Perorsaanermik Ilinniarfik / College of Social Education

== Faroe Islands ==
- University of the Faroe Islands

== Finland ==
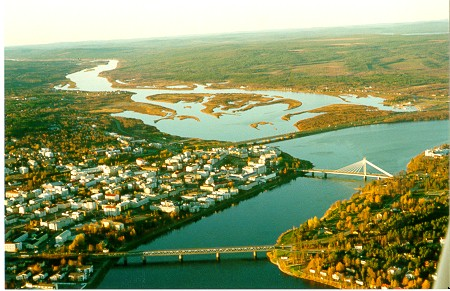
Rovaniemi, Finland

- Diaconia University of Applied Sciences
- Finnish Institute of Occupational Health
- Finnish Meteorological Institute
- Lapland University of Applied Sciences
- Laurea University of Applied Sciences
- Oulu University of Applied Sciences
- Sámi Education Institute
- University of Eastern Finland
- University of Helsinki
- University of Lapland
- University of Oulu
- Tampere University
- University of Turku

== Iceland ==
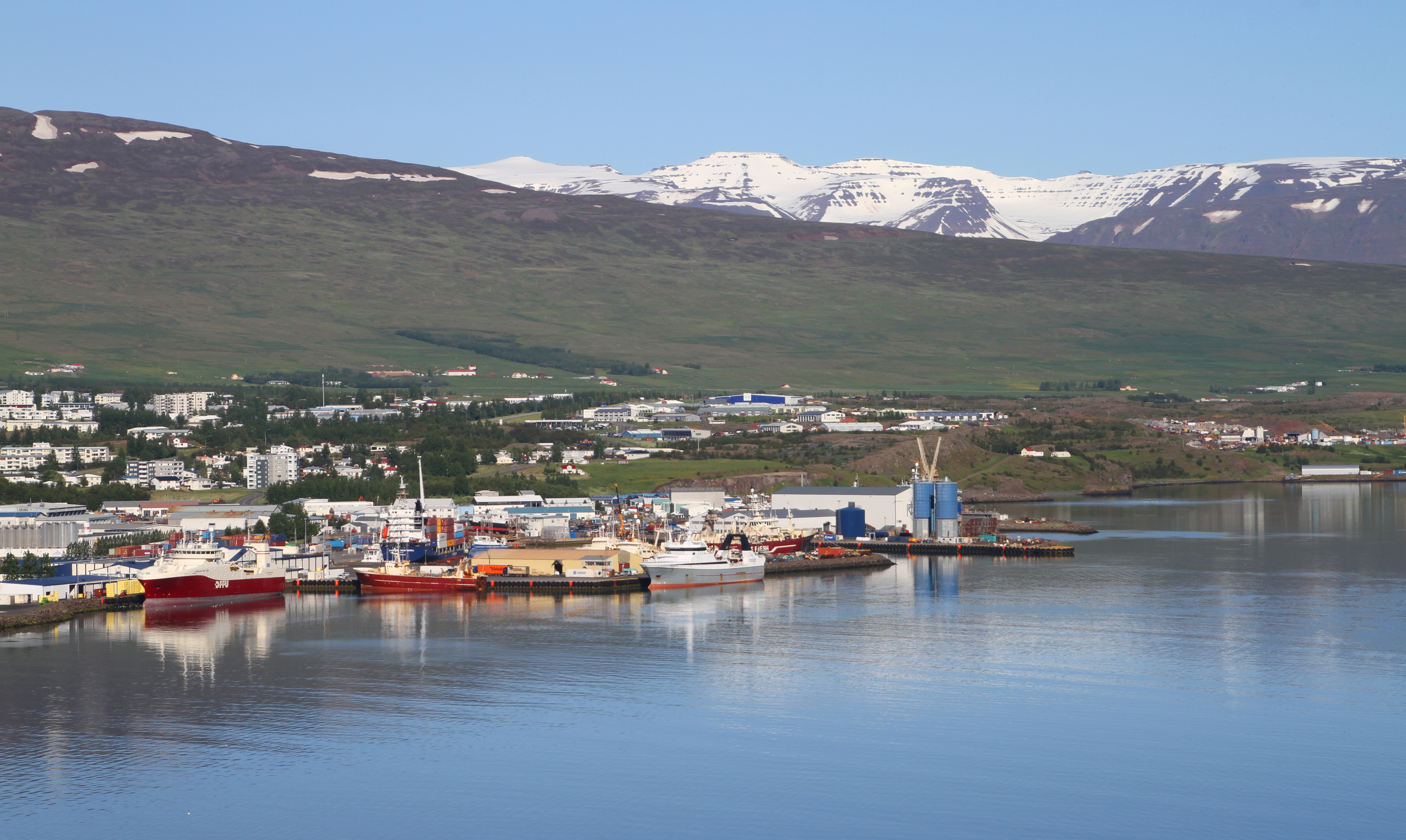
Akureyri, Iceland

- Arctic Portal
- Bifröst University
- Iceland Academy of the Arts
- Reykjavik University
- Stefansson Arctic Institute
- University Centre of the Westfjords
- University of Akureyri
- University of Iceland

== Norway ==
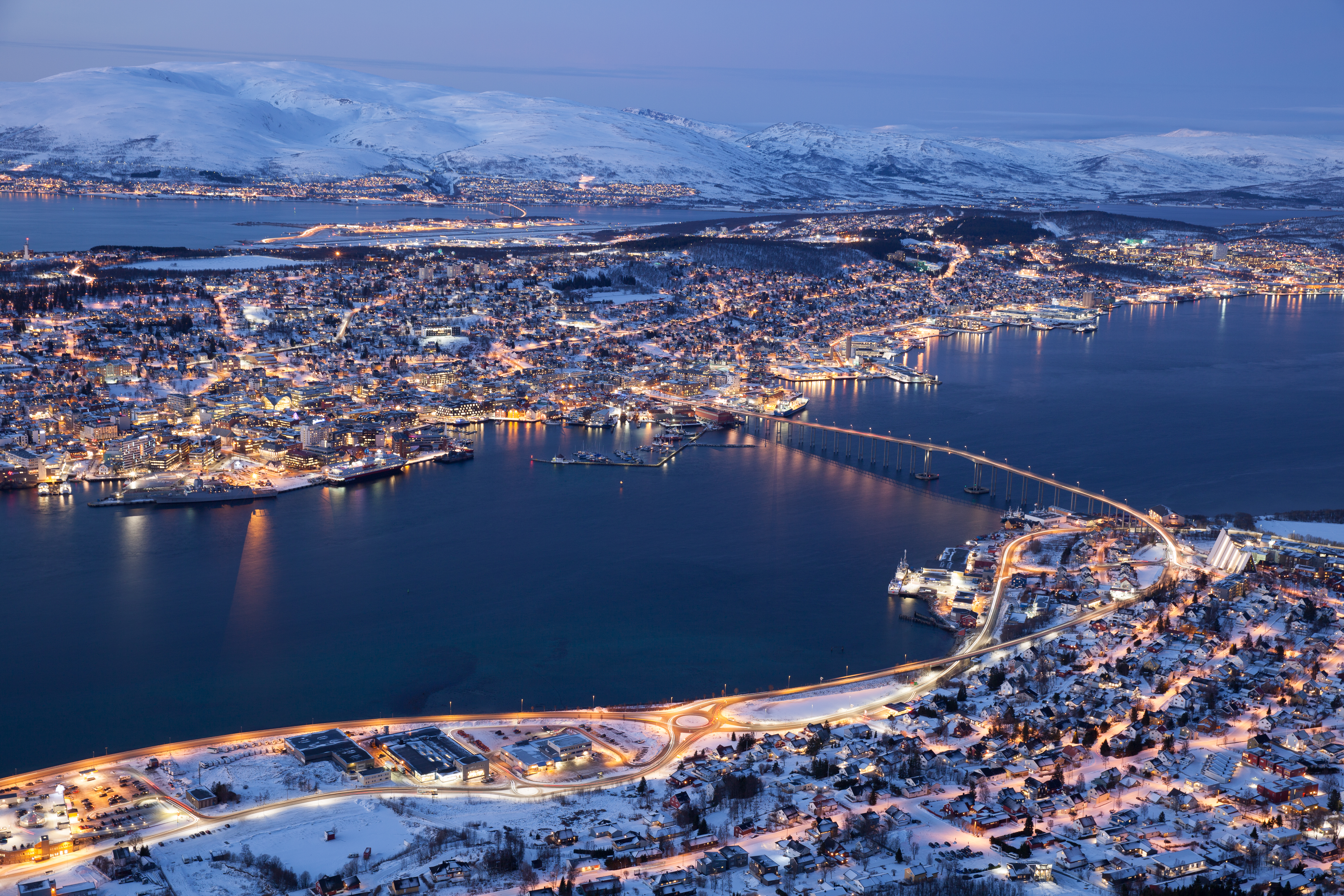
Tromsø, Norway

- Arran Lulesami Center
- Center for International Climate and Environmental Research
- GÁLDU Resource Centre for the Rights of Indigenous Peoples
- GRID-Arendal
- International Centre for Reindeer Husbandry
- Nord University
- Norwegian Scientific Academy for Polar Research
- Norwegian University of Science and Technology
- Sámi University of Applied Sciences
- UiT The Arctic University of Norway
- University Centre in Svalbard
- University of Agder
- University of Bergen
- University of Oslo
- University of Stavanger

== Russia ==
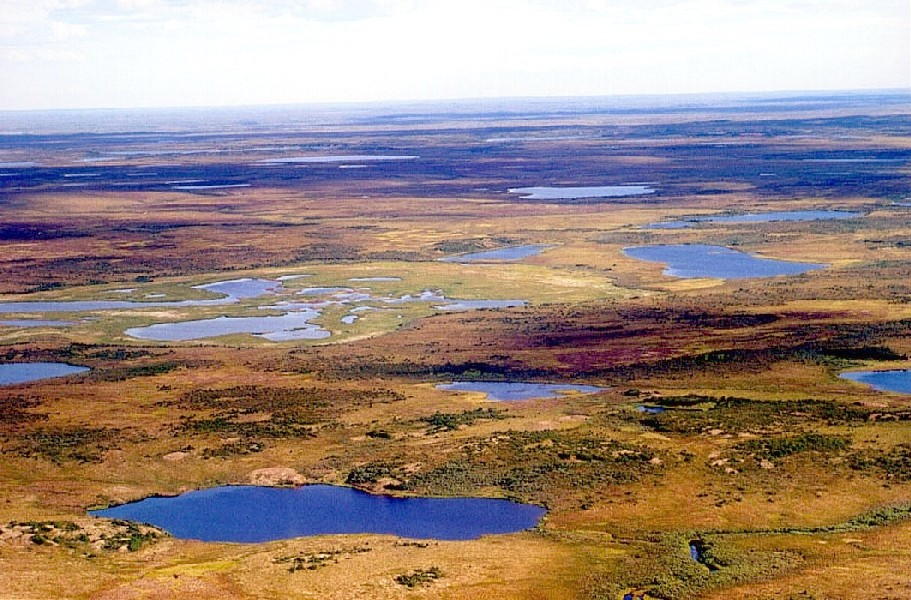
Yenissey Region, Russia

- Arctic College of the Peoples of the North
- Arctic State Institute of Arts and Culture
- Barguzinsky State Nature Biosphere Reserve and Zabaikalsky National Park
- Buryat State Academy of Agriculture
- Buryat State University
- Centre for Support of Indigenous Peoples of the North / Russian Indigenous Training Centre
- Churapchinsky State Institute for Physical Education and Sports
- East-Siberian Institute of Economics and Management
- European University at St Petersburg
- Far Eastern Federal University
- Far Eastern State Transportation University
- Herzen State Pedagogical University of Russia
- Industrial University of Tyumen
- Institute of the Humanities and the Indigenous Peoples of the North, Siberian Branch of the Russian Academy of Sciences
- Karelian Research Centre of the Russian Academy of Sciences
- Komi Republican Academy of State Service and Administration
- Luzin Institute for Economic Studies - Kola Science Centre RAS
- Murmansk Arctic State University
- Murmansk State Technical University
- Naryan-Mar Social Humanitarian College
- National Research Tomsk State University
- Nenets Agrarian Economic Technical School
- Nizhnevartovsk State University
- Norilsk State Industrial Institute
- North-Eastern Federal University
- Northern (Arctic) Federal University
- Northern National College
- Northern State Medical University
- Petrozavodsk State University
- Project Management Centre
- Pskov State University
- RAIPON
- Russian State Hydrometeorological University
- Scientific Research Institute of National Schools of the Republic of Sakha (Yakutia)
- Siberian Federal University
- St. Petersburg University
- Surgut State Pedagogical University
- Surgut State University
- Syktyvkar Forest Institute
- Syktyvkar State University
- Taymyr College
- Tyumen State University
- Ukhta State Technical University
- Ural Federal University
- Yakutsk State Agricultural Academy
- Yamal Multidisciplinary College
- Yamal Polar Agroeconomic Technical School
- Yugra State University

== Sweden ==
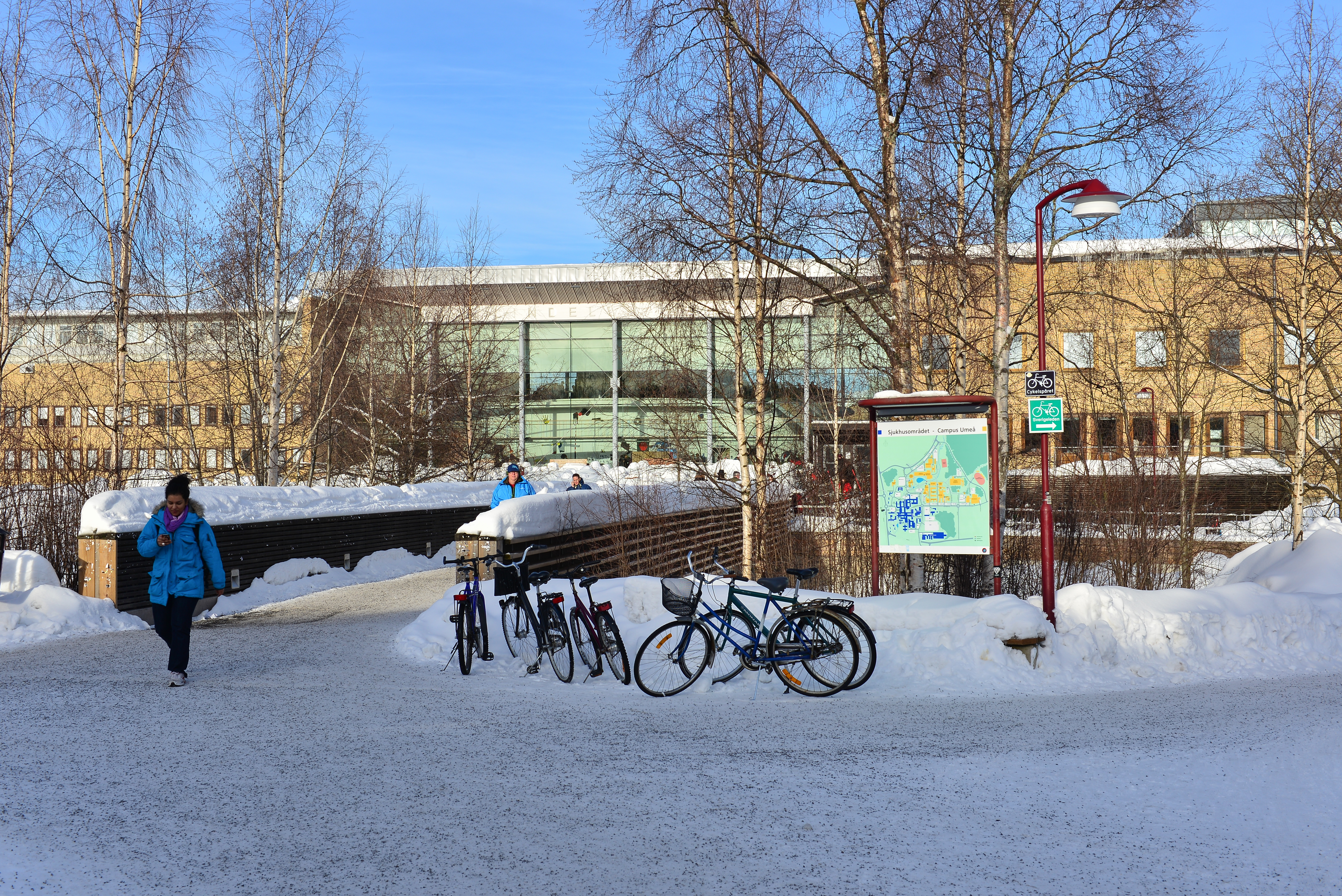
Umeå University, Sweden

- Abisko Scientific Research Station
- Luleå University of Technology
- Lund University
- Mid Sweden University
- Sámi Educational Centre
- Stockholm University
- Umeå University

== United States ==
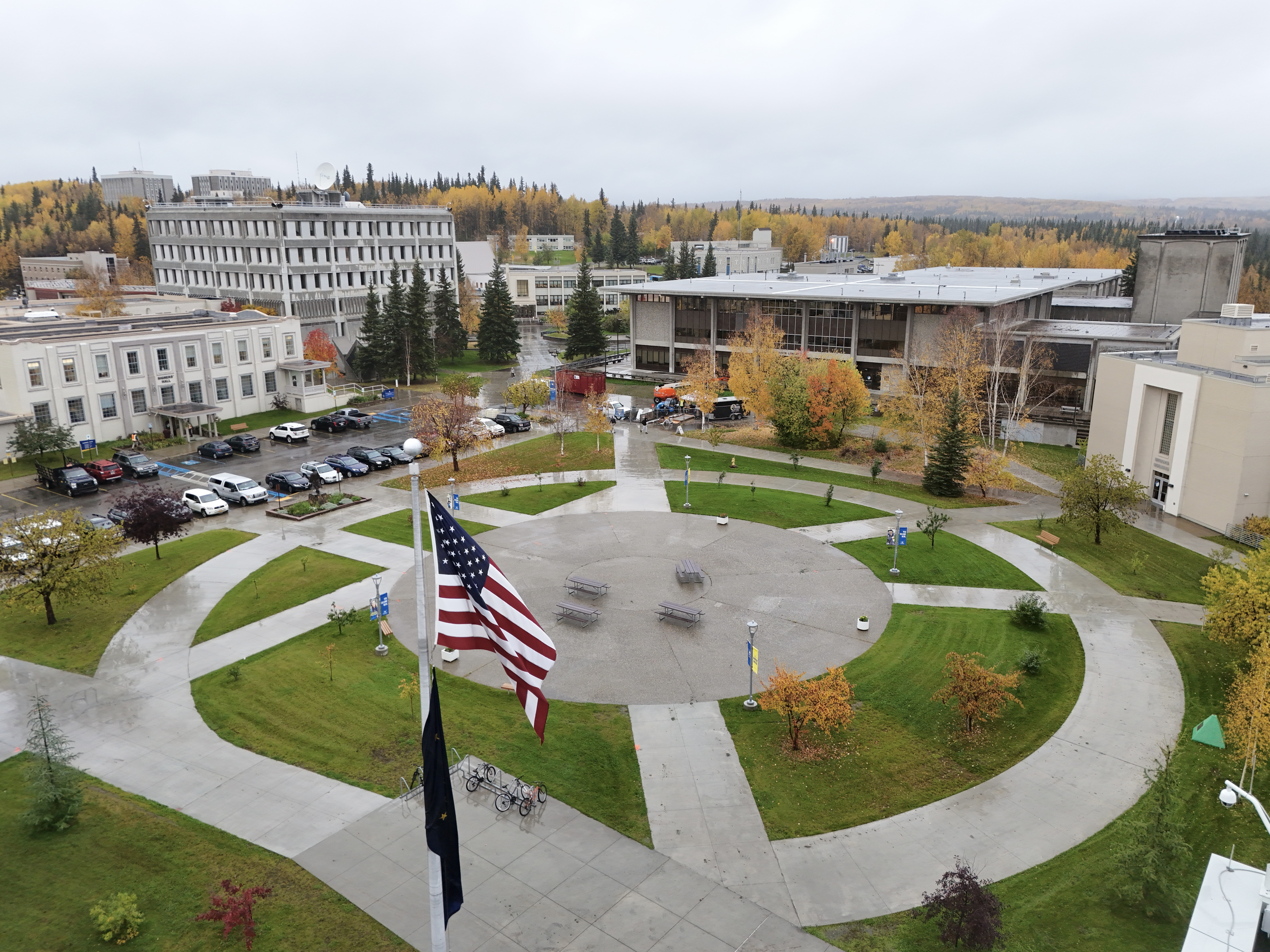
University of Alaska Fairbanks, USA

- Alaska Pacific University
- Aleut International Association
- Anchorage Museum
- Arctic Initiative, Belfer Center, Harvard Kennedy School
- Arctic Research Consortium of the United States
- ARCTICenter - University of Northern Iowa
- Battelle Memorial Institute
- Climate Change Institute - University of Maine
- Cold Climate Housing Research Center
- Dartmouth College
- Fletcher School of Law and Diplomacy - Tufts University
- Iḷisaġvik College
- Institute of the North
- Scandinavian Seminar Group
- Science Diplomacy Center
- The Yellow Tulip Project
- University of Alaska Anchorage
- University of Alaska Fairbanks
- University of Alaska Southeast
- University of Colorado
- University of Maine at Fort Kent
- University of New England
- University of New Hampshire
- University of North Dakota
- University of Southern Maine
- University of Washington
- Wilson Center - Polar Institute

== Non-Arctic ==
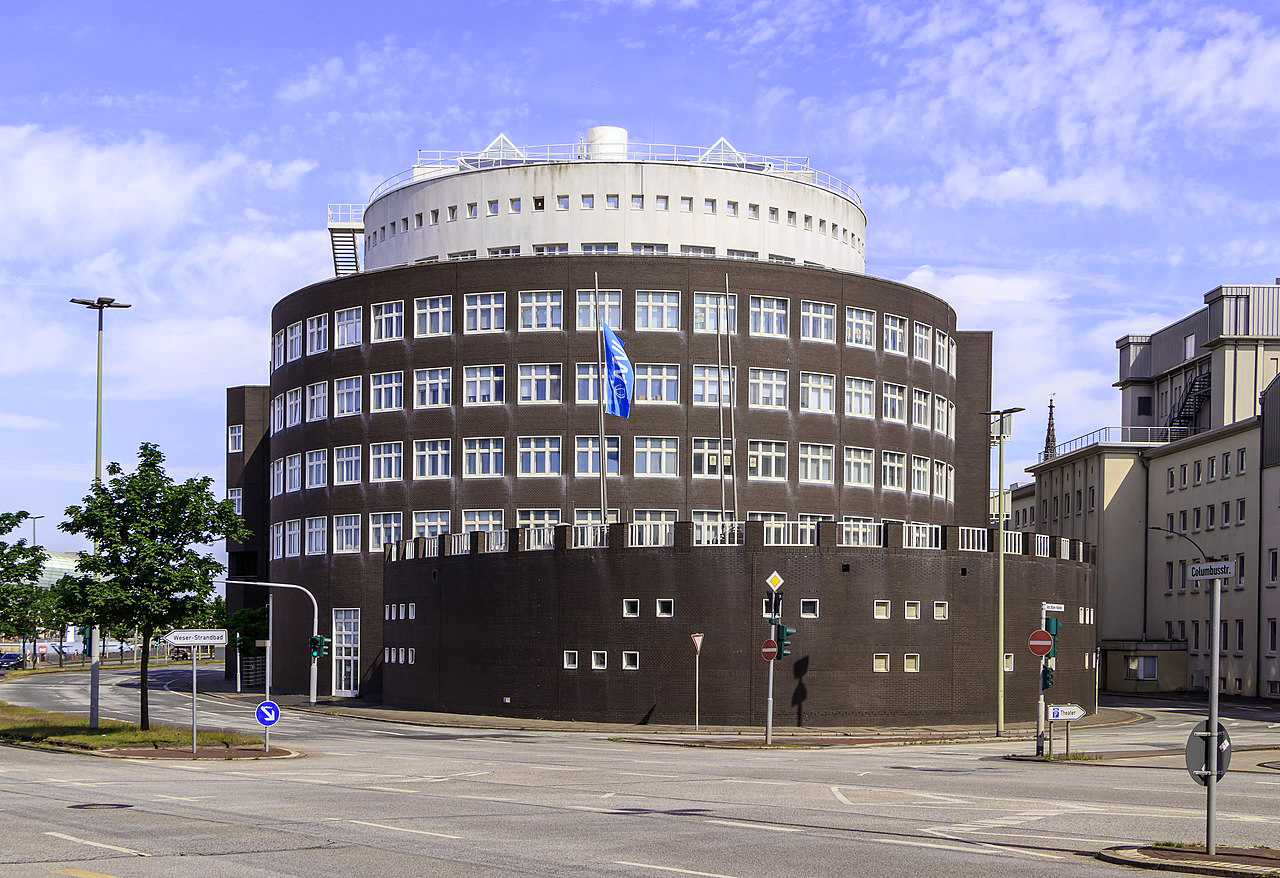
Alfred Wegener Institute for Polar and Marine Research, Germany

- International Polar Foundation
- Arctic Basecamp

=== Austria ===
- Austrian Polar Research Institute

=== China ===
- Arctic Studies Center, Liaocheng University
- Chinese Academy of Meteorological Sciences
- Chinese Research Academy of Environmental Sciences
- Dalian Maritime University
- Environmental Development Centre - Ministry of Environmental Protection
- First Institute of Oceanography, Ministry of Natural Resources
- Fudan University
- Second Institute of Oceanography, State Oceanic Administration
- Third Institute of Oceanography, State Oceanic Administration
- National Marine Environmental Forecasting Center
- Ocean University of China
- Polar Research Institute of China

=== Chile ===
- Instituto Milenio BASE

=== Czech Republic ===
- Centre for Polar Ecology, University of South Bohemia

=== France ===
- Aix-Marseille University
- Research Centre CEARC - University of Versailles Saint-Quentin-en-Yvelines
- University of Western Brittany

=== Germany ===
- Alfred Wegener Institute for Polar and Marine Research
- Universität Hamburg

=== India ===
- Centre for Arctic Studies
- India

=== Ireland ===
- Halpin Research Centre

=== Japan ===
- Hokkaido University

=== Korea ===
- Korea Maritime Institute
- Korea Polar Research Institute

=== Netherlands ===
- Arctic Centre, University of Groningen
- Arctic Reflections

=== Australia ===
- University of Tasmania

=== Mongolia ===
- Educational Studies School - Mongolian National University of Education

=== United Kingdom ===
- Centre for Climate Repair, University of Cambridge
- Durham University
- University of Aberdeen
- University of Dundee
- University of the Highlands and Islands
- Glasgow Caledonian University
- Glasgow School of Art
- Heriot-Watt University
- Robert Gordon University
- Royal College of Art
- University of Edinburgh
- University of Glasgow
- University of Hull
- University of Liverpool
- University of St. Andrews
- University of Stirling
- University of Strathclyde
- University of Westminster
