= Circumpolar studies =

Study of arctic and subarctic regions

Circumpolar studies (also Northern studies) is an interdisciplinary field of study combining social science and geoscience and involving topics like land, environment, peoples, cultures, and politics in Arctic and Subarctic states, that is, the United States (Alaska), Canada, Denmark (Greenland), Iceland, Norway, Sweden, Finland, and Russia. Because of circumpolar regions' past as colonised territories inhabited by nomads, circumpolar studies focusses on indigenous peoples as well as early agricultural settlers.

== Information ==
Circumpolar studies is the interdisciplinary study of regions located on and above the arctic circle. As such, circumpolar studies embraces wider than Arctic studies, which deals with the Arctic sensu stricto.

Classified as regional studies, circumpolar studies finds a parallel in European studies, African studies, Latin American studies, and so on. Gaining increased prominence in the wake of post-Cold War initiatives like the Arctic Council, circumpolar studies is maintained as an independent field of study by universities like the University of Alaska Fairbanks and Nord University and recognised as ditto by publishers like Berghahn Books.

Based on a degree model developed by the University of the Arctic, over twenty educational institutions in circumpolar regions offer circumpolar studies at undergraduate level, including bachelor's degrees and short-term programmes. There is also a French university offering circumpolar studies at graduate level.

The Arctic Centre at the University of Groningen publishes an eponymous series with biennial volumes, while the Journal of Northern Studies is published at Umeå University. Related research centres include the Center for Northern Studies at Nord University.

== Literature ==
- Beach, Hugh (1986) Contributions to circumpolar studies. Uppsala: University of Uppsala.
