= Per Arne Godejord =

Per Arne Godejord (born 24 May 1965, Bergen, Norway) is a Norwegian senior lecturer in social informatics and politician. His work as a lecturer was focused on didactics of social informatics, using the theme of sexual abuse of children on Internet as a way of teaching social informatics to computer science students and teacher education students. He is working in the field of e-didactics.

He was ICT Manager at Nesna University College from 1994 to 1999. From 2001 to 2003, he was assistant professor of computer science, and from 2003 to 2008 senior lecturer in social informatics. He was Dean of the Faculty of Scientific Subjects at Nesna University College from 2008 to 2011. He was Dean of the Faculty of Economics, Management and Leadership at Nord-Trondelag University College from August 2011 to August 2014.

He has also held a number of honorary positions, including leader of Nesna Conservative Party 2009-2011, Nesna Conservative Party's candidate for mayor in 2011, and leader of the Conservative Party in Levanger from January 2012 to October 2012. From 2002 to 2012 he held the position as the appointed Clan Bell International representative for Norway.

== International publications ==
• 2008 - Nowe obszary kommunikacyjne - nowe wyzwania dla edukacji/ New communication spaces - new educational risks (co-author: Beata Godejord), Social communication in virtual world, ISBN 978-83-7611-114-8, Adam Marszałek Publishing House
• 2008 - Perspectives on Awareness Work in the Field of Sexual Abuse of Children in Digital Media, Child Sexual Abuse: Issues and Challenges, ISBN 1-60021-999-3, Nova Science Publishers
• 2008 - Getting Involved: Perspectives on the Use of True Projects as Tools for Developing Ethical Thinking in Computer Science Students, International Journal of Technology and Human Interaction, Vol. 4, Issue 2
• 2007 - Perspectives on project based teaching and “blended learning” to develop ethical awareness in students, eLearning Papers Nº 6
• 2007 - Fighting child pornography: Exploring didactics and student engagement in social informatics, Journal of the American Society for Information Science and Technology, Volume 58, Issue 3
