= Human & Experimental Toxicology =

- Discipline: Toxicology
- Language: English
- Edited by: Kai Savolainen

Publication details
- Former name: Human Toxicology
- History: 1981–present
- Publisher: SAGE Publications
- Frequency: Monthly
- Impact factor: 2.171 (2018)

Standard abbreviations
- ISO 4: Hum. Exp. Toxicol.

Indexing
- CODEN: HETOEA
- ISSN: 0960-3271 (print); 1477-0903 (web)
- LCCN: 90031138
- OCLC no.: 21307548

Links
- Journal homepage; Online access; Online archive

Human & Experimental Toxicology is a peer-reviewed medical journal covering the field of toxicology. It was established in 1981 as Human Toxicology and obtained its current name in 1990. It is published by SAGE Publications and the editor-in-chief is Kai Savolainen (Finnish Institute of Occupational Health).

== Abstracting and indexing ==
The journal is abstracted and indexed in Current Contents, Scopus, and the Science Citation Index Expanded. According to the Journal Citation Reports, its 2018 impact factor is 2.171, ranking it 64th out of 87 journals in the category "Toxicology".
