= University of Nordland =

Former public university in Bodø, Norway

Coordinates: 67°17′20″N 14°33′37″E

- Universitetet i Nordland
- Type: Public
- Active: 2011–2015
- Affiliations: UArctic
- Rector: Pål A. Pedersen (2011-2015)
- Students: 5800 (2011)
- Location: Bodø, Norway
- Website: web.archive.org/web/20151004092154/http://www.uin.no:80/en

The University of Nordland, (Abbreviation: UiN; Norwegian: Universitetet i Nordland) previously Bodø University College, was a public university located in Bodø, Norway. In January 2016, the university was merged with Nesna University College and Nord-Trøndelag University College, becoming Nord University.

It offers a wide range of undergraduate and graduate programs in various fields such as arts, humanities, social sciences, natural sciences, technology, education, health, and business.

UIN has also established several research centers, including the Centre for Sami Studies, the Centre for Rural Research, and the Centre for Age-related Medicine.

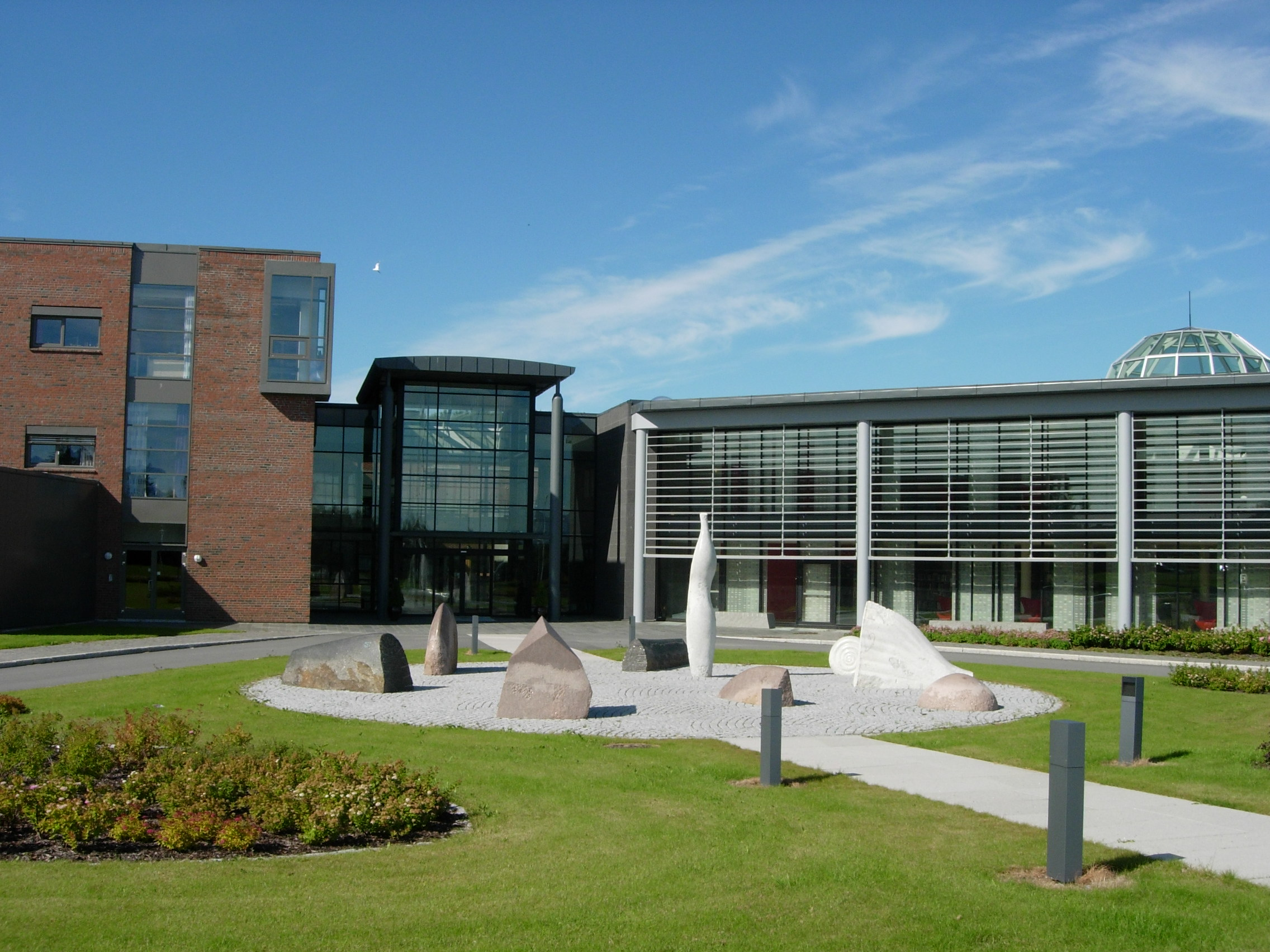
University of Nordland Graduate School of Business

== Academics ==
Programmes taught in English:

- Bachelor of Circumpolar Studies
- Bachelor of English
- Bachelor of Science in Biology
- Master in Social Work
- Master of Science in Marine Ecology
- Master of Science in Aquaculture
- Master of Science in Business
- Master of Science in Energy Management
- Master of Science in Sustainable Management

== Faculties ==
- Biosciences and Aquaculture
- Graduate School of Business
- School of Professional Studies
- Social Sciences

== See also ==
- Centre for High North Logistics, a business foundation associated with the university.
