= Nordic Women's University =

Research organization

- Formation: 2011
- Type: Foundation
- Location: Nesna, Norway
- Chair of the Board: Gunhild Vehusheia
- CEO: Hilde Rokkan
- Chair of the Council: Dagrunn Grønbech
- Website: http://www.kvinnor.no

The Nordic Women's University (NWU; Norwegian: Stiftelsen Kvinneuniversitetet i Norden) is a Nordic research organisation, hosted by Nord University and incorporated as a foundation in Norway. It is involved in "research, teaching and information on and for women, grounded in feminist values and feminist pedagogics and with particular emphasis on Nordic and international perspectives." Established in 2011 on the initiative of former MP Berit Ås and others, the NWU is entirely funded by the Ministry of Education and Research and the Ministry of Children, Equality and Social Inclusion and hosted by one of the 24 Norwegian state university colleges. It received 1 million NOK in initial funding from the two ministries and as of 2012 further 2 million NOK from the Ministry of Education and Research, and receives funding over the State budget of Norway. Its establishment was supported by Tora Aasland, the Minister of Research and Higher Education, and law professor Henning Jakhelln and lawyer and Labour politician Ingjald Ørbeck Sørheim were also involved in the effort.

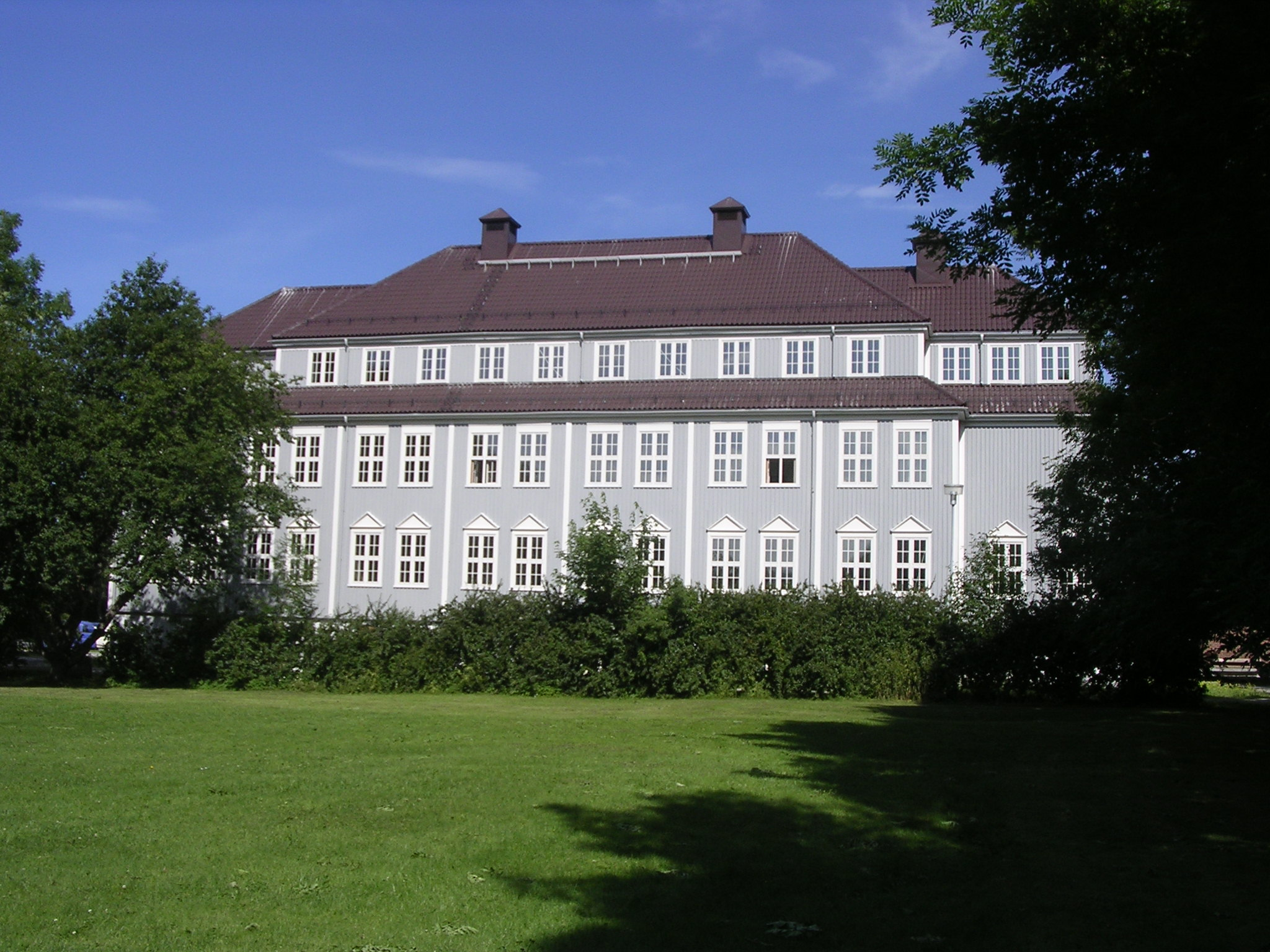
The administration building of Nesna University College, where the administration of the Nordic Women's University is located

Its roots date back to 1983, when Berit Ås was instrumental in founding the first Women's University (Stiftelsen Kvinneuniversitetet) in Norway.

It focuses on areas of research relevant to women, such as women's work, the gender pay gap, parenting, and violence against women.

The board of the then-Nesna University College approved the agreement to host the Nordic Women's University in 2010. The foundation was founded on 11 January 2011 at the University of Oslo Faculty of Law. It is not accredited by NOKUT as a university, but has permission from the Ministry of Education and Research to use the designation (which is protected by law in Norway) in its name. The organisation's council was established on 15 October 2011 with representatives from Denmark, Finland, Iceland, Lithuania, Norway and Sweden. On 29 October, the organisation was launched in Sweden during a seminar in cooperation with Arbetarnas bildningsförbund. Former Swedish MP and MEP Maj Britt Theorin was elected chair of the committee on "Violence against women". Nesna University College was merged into Nord University in 2016.

Its administration is located in the administration building (Gammelbygget) of Nord University in Nesna.

It is based on the bylaws of the first Women's University, founded by Berit Ås, Ragnhild Queseth Haarstad and nine other women as an all-party initiative in 1983.

== Notable alumni ==
- Farida Ahmadi, Afghan author, speaker and women's rights activist, living in Norway
