= Icelandic Arctic Cooperation Network =

- Abbreviation: IACN
- Formation: 2013
- Type: Non-governmental organization
- Purpose: To initiate, encourage, and facilitate Icelandic and international cooperation on Arctic issues
- Headquarters: Akureyri, Iceland
- Members: 30 Organizations
- Director: Embla Eir Oddsdóttir
- Website: arcticiceland.is

The Icelandic Arctic Cooperation Network (IACN) is a non-governmental organization in Iceland creating stronger linkages through inclusive multi-stakeholder membership and network, for the facilitation of cooperation concerning the Arctic region. The Icelandic government passed a "Governmental Policy Plan for the Economy and Community" called Iceland 20/20. The Icelandic Arctic Cooperation Network, established in 2013, is a part of the implementation process of this policy and the result of a collaboration between the members of the IACN; Eything - a regional body for cooperation between the municipalities in north-east Iceland; the Ministry for Foreign Affairs (Iceland), the Ministry of Education, Science and Culture (Iceland); and the Ministry for the Environment and Natural Resources (Iceland).

The network is headquartered in Akureyri, Iceland, and works to facilitate cooperation on Arctic issues within Iceland and internationally, including by supporting Icelandic participation in Arctic Council-related work, organising and co-organising Arctic events, participating in international projects, and providing information and consultation on Icelandic Arctic activities.

Current members include the Municipality of Akureyri, the Arctic Council working groups Conservation of Arctic Flora and Fauna (CAFF) and Protection of the Arctic Marine Environment (PAME), the University Centre of the Westfjords, the University of Akureyri, and the University of Iceland.

IACN's first director is Embla Eir Oddsdóttir.

The Icelandic Arctic Cooperation Network is one of four founders of the Icelandic-Arctic Chamber of Commerce. The other three are the Ministry for Foreign Affairs, Iceland; The Icelandic Chamber of Commerce; and the Federation of Icelandic Industries.

The network is based in the research centre Borgir, in Akureyri, Iceland.

== Mission and activities ==
IACN describes its mission as initiating, encouraging and facilitating cooperation on Arctic issues within Iceland and internationally. Its stated activities include supporting Iceland's participation in the work of the Arctic Council, strengthening communication and cooperation on Arctic issues within Iceland, providing guidance and consultation, increasing the visibility of Icelandic institutions and organisations working on Arctic issues, and distributing information about Icelandic Arctic activities to academia, policy makers and the public.

The network's work includes participation in domestic and international Arctic projects, consultation, and the organisation or co-organisation of events related to Arctic policy, research and cooperation.

== Membership ==
IACN's membership consists of Icelandic legal entities working on issues related to the Arctic. The network also collaborates with domestic and international partners, including institutions, governments, municipalities and associations. As of May 2026, IACN's website listed 30 members, 40 partners and 29 collaborators.

== Projects and Initiatives ==
IACN organises and co-organises Arctic-related events and activities in Iceland and internationally. Every year, for example, the network co-organises sessions at the Arctic Circle Assembly, including sessions on research cooperation and gender equality. The network has also organised public consultation meetings in Akureyri connected to the implementation of Iceland's Arctic policy.

=== Gender Equality in the Arctic ===
IACN has been involved in the multi-phase Gender Equality in the Arctic project, an international initiative connected to the Arctic Council's Sustainable Development Working Group (SDWG). The third phase of the project was part of Iceland's 2019–2021 Arctic Council Chairmanship programme and resulted in the publication of the Pan-Arctic Report: Gender Equality in the Arctic in 2021.

The report addressed gender-related issues across Arctic societies, including law and governance, security, environment, migration and mobility, Indigeneity, violence, reconciliation, empowerment and fate control. Subsequent phases have focused on topics including gender and disaggregated data in the Arctic. In 2024, a Phase IV workshop on Indigenous knowledge-sharing and gender equality was held at MacEwan University in Edmonton, Canada, and was organised by IACN under the leadership of Bridget Larocque of the Arctic Athabaskan Council, with support from Crown-Indigenous Relations and Northern Affairs Canada.

In 2025, IACN announced a fifth phase of the project, continuing its work with the Arctic Council's Sustainable Development Working Group and focusing on Arctic perspectives on crime, violence and local responses.

=== Plastics in the Arctic and Atlantic ===
IACN has also been connected to international work on marine plastic pollution in Arctic and northern marine environments. The first International Symposium on Plastics in the Arctic and Sub-Arctic Region was hosted online in 2021 by the Government of Iceland in collaboration with international partners, following Iceland's emphasis on marine plastic pollution during its 2019–2021 Arctic Council Chairmanship and its 2019 Presidency of the Nordic Council of Ministers.

A second symposium was held at Harpa Concert Hall and Conference Centre in Reykjavík in November 2023. The event aimed to gather scientific, Indigenous and local knowledge on plastic pollution and to discuss ways to reduce the effects of plastics on Arctic ecosystems.

The third symposium, Atlantic Plastics 2026, was announced as the Third International Symposium on Marine Plastic Pollution – Arctic to the Antarctic, scheduled for 20–22 October 2026 at Harpa in Reykjavík. According to the Stefansson Arctic Institute, the event is hosted by the Government of Iceland in cooperation with partners including IACN and PAME, the Arctic Council Working Group on the Protection of the Arctic Marine Environment. The University of the Arctic described the symposium as a forum for researchers, policymakers, industry representatives and practitioners to examine marine plastic pollution across the Atlantic and connected Arctic waters, including macro-debris, microplastics and nanoplastics.

== Public engagement and outreach ==
=== Share Your North ===
IACN co-hosts Share Your North – Arctic Cooperation and Dialogue, an online platform for seminars, lectures, conversations and interviews on life and development in the Arctic. The platform describes its aim as promoting Arctic and Traditional knowledges and facilitating exchange between local communities, students, early-career researchers, scholars, experts, universities, research institutions, Indigenous peoples and the private sector.

The platform has hosted webinars and events on topics including renewable energy, Indigenous knowledge, gender equality, Arctic security, science cooperation and food security. A 2026 report to the Icelandic parliament on the implementation of Iceland's regional development plan stated that, through IACN, 20 thematic webinars had been held on Share Your North with more than 80 domestic and international organisers and around 120 Icelandic and international expert speakers.

=== Speaking of the Arctic ===
In 2025, IACN launched Speaking of the Arctic, a podcast hosted through the Share Your North platform. The first episode was released on 26 September 2025, introducing the podcast and discussing personal connections to the Arctic and to Akureyri in northern Iceland.
