= Nord University Business School =

Business school in Northern Norway

Coordinates: 67°17′21″N 14°33′36″E

- Handelshøgskolen Nord
- Former names: Bodø Graduate School of Business
- Type: Business school
- Established: 1985
- Parent institution: Nord University
- Affiliations: AACSB; EDAMBA
- Dean: Gry Agnete Alsos
- Director: Steinar Stene-Sørensen
- Academic staff: 220
- Students: 2,700
- Location: Bodø, Nordland, Norway
- Campus: Urban
- Colors: Teal
- Website: www.nord.no/en/nord-university-business-school

Nord University Business School (Norwegian: Handelshøgskolen Nord) or HHN is a business school and faculty of Nord University located at Mørkved in Bodø Municipality, Norway. Established in 1985, the School has grown continuously and is today Nord University’s leading educator of management personnel to the business community in Northern Norway. The School maintains a solid research environment within economic‑administrative disciplines, notably entrepreneurship, innovation management, financial management in the public sector, transport economics, ecological economics and ethics.

It has approximately 2,700 students and 220 staff members, admitting around 1,000 new students annually to its bachelor and master programmes. The School offers undergraduate and graduate programmes in business administration, accounting, auditing and information technology, including the Master of Science in Business. It also offers a doctoral PhD in Business and is a member of the European Doctoral Programmes Association in Management & Business Administration (EDAMBA). It is also an AACSB member institution, aligning with international quality standards for business education.

== History ==
HHN was created in 1985 as Bodø Graduate School of Business and was the second college in Norway allowed to offer postgraduate business administration education in Norway. Before this the only available Master of Business Administration was offered at the Norwegian School of Economics and Business Administration in Bergen. In 1994 a reform to merge the regional colleges to create university colleges was performed, and HHN was made part of Bodø University College (from 2011: University of Nordland). In 2004 the college started undergraduate education in Mo i Rana. In January 2016, University of Nordland was merged with Nesna University College and Nord-Trøndelag University College, becoming Nord University.
