= University of Akureyri =

University in Akureyri, Iceland

Coordinates: 65.6855°N 18.1224°W

- Háskólinn á Akureyri
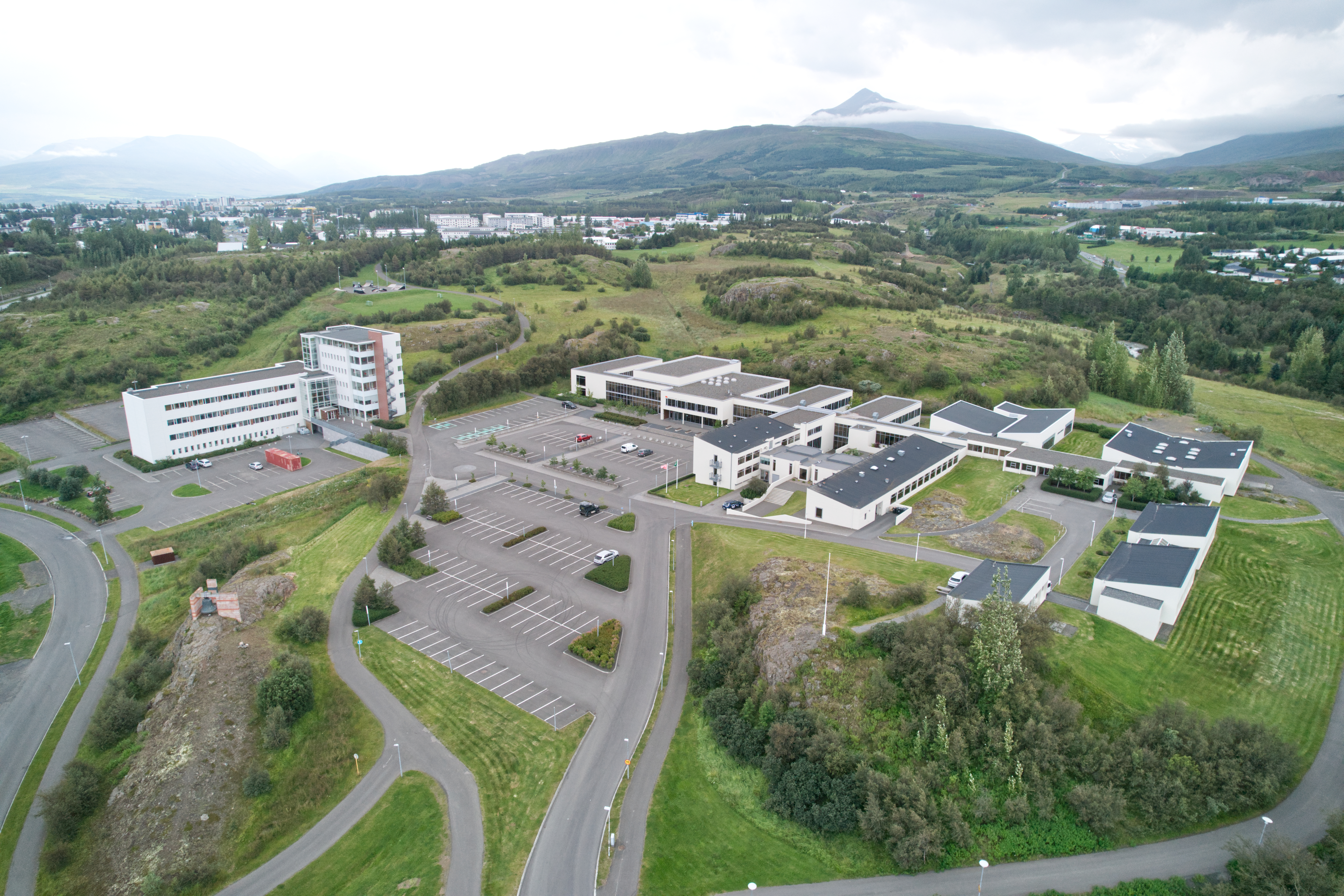
- Other names: HA, UNAK
- Type: Public
- Established: September 5, 1987
- Affiliations: EUA, UArctic
- Chancellor: Áslaug Ásgeirsdóttir
- Faculty: ca. 134
- Administrative staff: 134 (2024)
- Students: 2853 (2024)
- Location: Akureyri, Iceland
- Colors: Red
- Website: www.unak.is
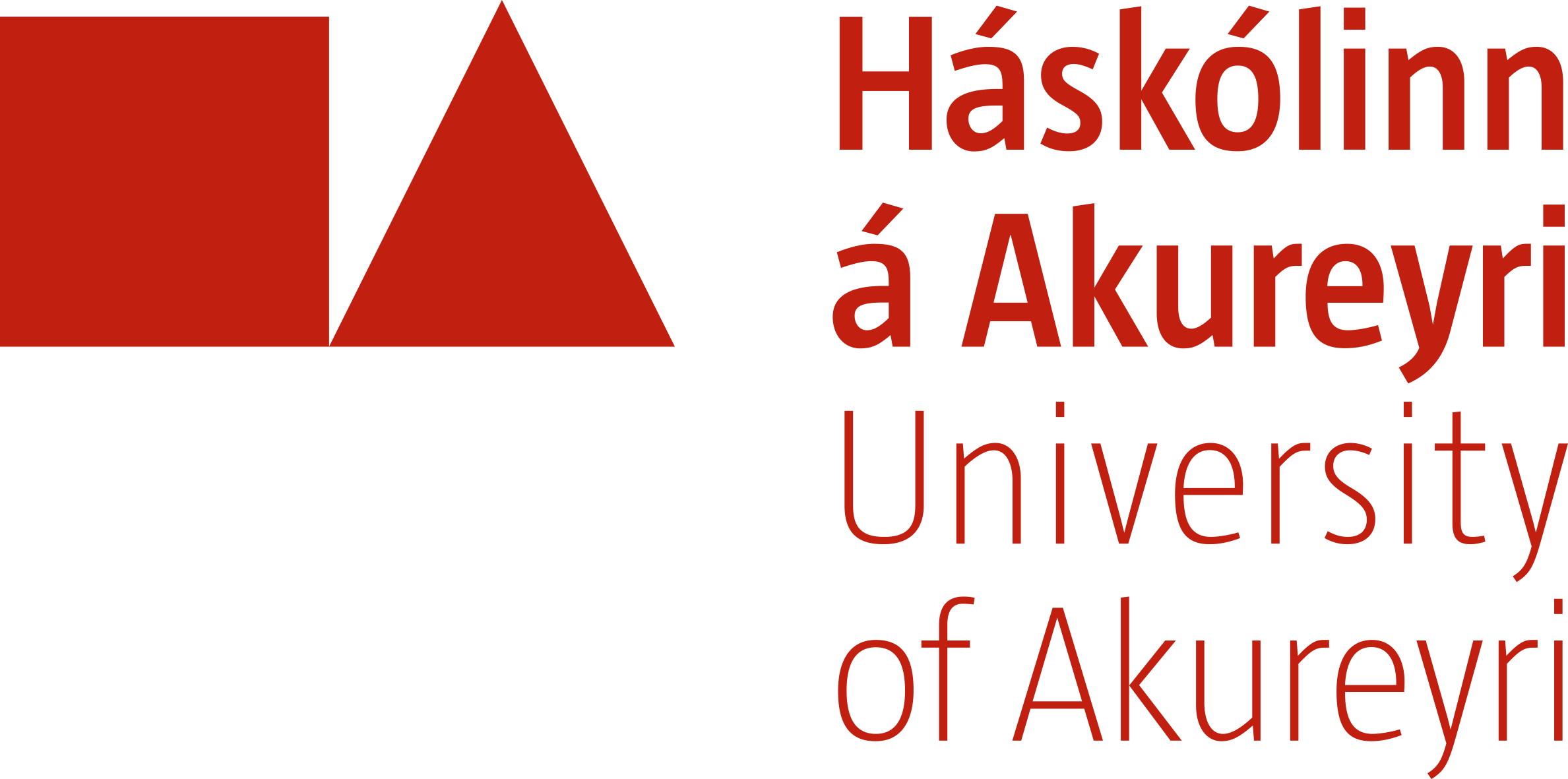

The University of Akureyri (Icelandic: Háskólinn á Akureyri [ˈhauːˌskouːlɪn au ˈaːkʏrˌeiːrɪ], regionally also [ˈaːkʰʏr-]) was founded in 1987 in the town of Akureyri in the northeastern part of Iceland. It is today a school of Humanities and Social science, and a school of Health, Business and Natural science. Over 2800 students attended the university in the autumn semester of 2024, around half of them through flexible learning, making the university the largest provider of distance education in the country. The University of Akureyri coordinates with other Icelandic Universities to operate the University Centre of the Westfjords located in Ísafjörður, which operates two master's degrees, one in Coastal and Marine Management and the other in Marine Innovation. Additionally, The University of Akureyri coordinates with other Nordic Universities for the West Nordic Studies and Polar Law Masters programs.

== History ==
The university was established in 1987 when the health sciences and industrial management studies began. The first rector was Haraldur Bessason. Staff were four people in total and the number of students 31. Two classrooms in the local sports center were used as classrooms. In 1988, the library was officially added to the school. Two months after the library was added, the Student Center opened. The first class to graduate was in 1989, and consisted of 10 industrial management students. On January 4, 1990, the Faculty of Fisheries was established. The first master's degree students graduated February 26, 2000. These students pursued a master's degree in nursing.

A new chancellor took over from Þorsteinn Gunnarsson on July 1, 2009 after 15 years in office, Stefán B. Sigurðsson. In autumn 2017, HA received authorization to offer doctoral studies. The first doctoral students enrolled at the school at the end of 2018, and the first doctoral defense at the school took place in autumn 2022. Graduation was held virtually in 2020 because of the COVID-19 pandemic.

== Campus ==
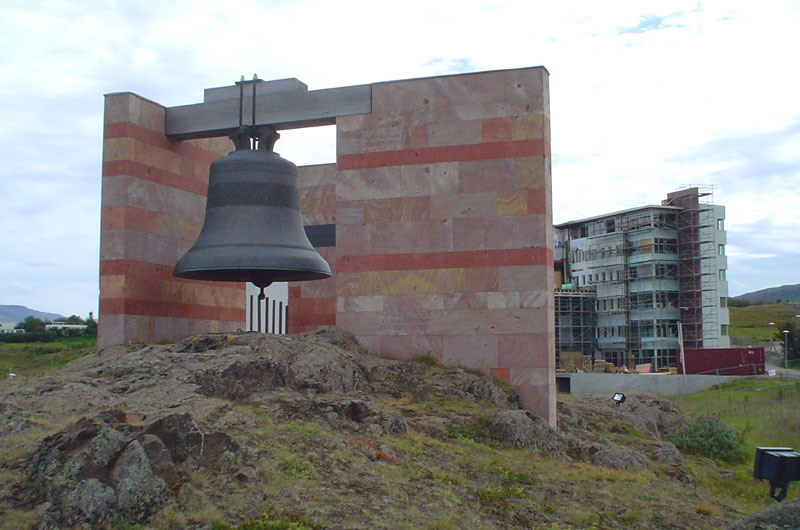
Íslandsklukkan in 2004, with Borgir under construction in the background

The main building, called Sólborg is a series of interconnected sections built in numerous phases since 1967. The university received its current residence in 1995. A new research and development building called Borgir was opened in 2004.

Teaching is conducted in two buildings at the University of Akureyri campus (Norðurslóð) called Sólborg and Borgir. The university campus area is centrally located in Akureyri.

Other facilities include a cafeteria, and a wellness and exercise centre.

=== Library ===
The university library is located at Sólborg, where there are facilities for reading and computer use. It is a research library and it tailors its purchases of material mostly according to the requirements of the university faculties and the research conducted at the university. Students have access to the reading rooms at all hours.

== Schools and faculties ==
School of Humanities and Social Sciences (Hug- og félagsvísindasvið)

Faculty of Social Science:

- BA Media Studies
- BA Modern Studies
- BA Social Sciences
- BA Police Science
- Diploma in Police Science for active police officers
- Diploma in Police Science for prospective police officers
- Masters of Art by Research
- Masters of Art Communication studies

Faculty of Psychology

- BS Psychology
- Masters of Science in Psychology

Faculty of Education:

- B.Ed. Preschool and Primary School Studies
- Diploma - Preschool Education
- M.Ed. Preschool, Primary School and Secondary Studies
- Postgraduate Diploma Educational Studies
- MA Educational Science
- Postgraduate Diploma Educational Science

Faculty of Law:

- BA Law
- Graduate Diploma-Law
- M.L. Law
- Master's degree Program leading to MA degree
- Master's degree Program in Polar Law (MA and LL.M.)

School of Health, Business and Science (Heilbrigðis, viðskipta- og raunvísindasvið)

Faculty of Occupational Therapy:

- BS Occupational Therapy
- Postgraduate Diploma Occupational Therapy

Faculty of Nursing:

- BS Nursing Studies

Faculty of Natural Resource Sciences:

- BS Biotechnology
- BS Fisheries Science
- MS Natural Resource Sciences
- MRM in Coastal & Marine Management (Program located in Ísafjörður through the University Centre of the Westfjords)

Faculty of Business Administration:

- BS Business Administration

Academic Programmes offered in partnership with the University of the Highlands and Islands (UHI)

Business and Management:

- Master of Business Administration
- Master's in Human Resource Management

Engineering:

- MSc Mechanical Engineering
- MSc Electrical Engineering
- MSc General Engineering

Sustainability:

- Master's in Sustainability

Healthcare Leadership:

- Master's in Healthcare Leadership

== Research ==
Most research is done by academic members of the staff in the university's Research and Development Center. In addition, there are other research institutes:

- Research and Development Centre of UNAK
- Research Centre on Children's Literature
- Research Centre for Health Science at UNAK
- The Icelandic Tourism Research Centre
- Centre of School Development at UNAK
- Research Centre Against Violence
- Fisheries Science Centre

=== Arctic issues ===
UNAK's policy emphasizes on being progressive in teaching and research that meets international standards. Emphasis is placed on teaching and research related to Icelandic society and economy, as well as fields related to Arctic issues.

UNAK is an international university where standards of research and teaching are international. UNAK emphasizes greatly on the importance to cooperate with universities in the North and is one of the founding members of the University of the Arctic, collaborative network of universities in the North. The University of the Arctic links together universities and organizes student exchange program (North2North), thematic networks, joint degree etc. UNAK's policy with the emphasis on Arctic issues has created uniqueness for the university which is now both domestically and abroad recognized for teaching and research in disciplines related to the North.

The University of Akureyri is also a founding partner of the Icelandic Arctic Cooperation Network. The main purpose of The Icelandic Arctic Cooperation Network is to increase the visibility and understanding of the Arctic and activities working towards the northern Iceland. The CEO of the network, Embla Eir Oddsdóttir, has for many years worked on projects and studies relating to the Arctic.

=== Conferences ===
The University of Akureyri Research and Development Centre (RHA) offers services for organizing conferences, meetings or conventions in partnership with professionals. RHA has good experience in organizing such events both domestically and abroad.

== External relations ==
=== International students ===
Each year the school receives many exchange students. These students come through one of four exchange programs:

- Nordplus
- Erasmus
- North2North
- Bilateral agreement between universities

Through these programs, students can come as guest students. This occurs when a student attends the university for a short period of time, but there is no formal co-operation between universities. Not only do students travel, but so do teachers. Through the Erasmus program, teachers have travelled to co-operating universities and given lectures. This exchange of teachers has taken place in many countries including: the United Kingdom, Denmark, Latvia, Germany, Italy, Sweden, Austria, Belgium, and France.

=== Agreement with Western Kentucky University ===
Western Kentucky University (WKU), the University of Akureyri (UNAK) and the Icelandic Arctic Cooperation Network (IACN) signed an academic and research agreement that solidifies the North Atlantic Climate Change Collaboration (NAC3) project.

The innovative agreement signed by the academic and research partners will center on academic exchanges and joint course offerings, research initiatives, capacity building, economic development activities, and service-learning. The NAC3 project aims to focus on academic exchange, course development and collaborative research in the areas of climate change, climate literacy, health and wellness, ocean dynamics, sustainability, informal public education, economic development, technology exchange, and water resources, among others. (Additional information about the project is available at www.wku.edu/iceland)

== See also ==
- Skemman.is (digital library)
