= Nord-Trøndelag University College =

- Høgskolen i Nord-Trøndelag
- Type: State College
- Established: 1994
- Rector: Steinar Nebb
- Administrative staff: 390
- Students: ca. 4,000 (2013)
- Undergraduates: ca. 5,300
- Location: Levanger; Namsos; Steinkjer; Stjørdal, Norway; 63°28′20″N 10°54′08″E

Nord-Trøndelag University College (Norwegian: Høgskolen i Nord-Trøndelag or HiNT) was a Norwegian university college located throughout the county of Nord-Trøndelag. HiNT had about 5,500 students and 440 employees in 2013. In January 2016, the university was merged with Nesna University College and the University of Nordland, becoming Nord University.

The school offered higher education within nursing, teaching, business administration, public administration, pharmacy, agriculture, engineering and information technology. Master degrees were offered within gymnastics (since 1971), interdisciplinary health studies and knowledge management, while a Master of Science in public administration was offered in cooperation with Trondheim Business School and Copenhagen Business School. Prior to the consolidation, its campuses were located in Levanger, Namsos, Steinkjer and Stjørdal, with the administration in Steinkjer.

The college was created in 1994 as a merger between a number of independent colleges in the county. HiNT had a revenue of NOK 330 million in 2008. Prior to the merger, the university college was associated with the research institution Trøndelag R&D Institute. HiNT took over the National Driving Teacher School in Stjørdal on 1 January 2004.

== Faculties ==
- Faculty of business, located in Steinkjer
- Faculty of health studies, located in Namsos and Levanger. Dean professor Øyvind Eikrem.
- Faculty of society and nature, located in Steinkjer
- Faculty of teacher education, located in Levanger
- Faculty of traffic teacher education, located in Stjørdal

This structure was implemented with the reform of 2007.

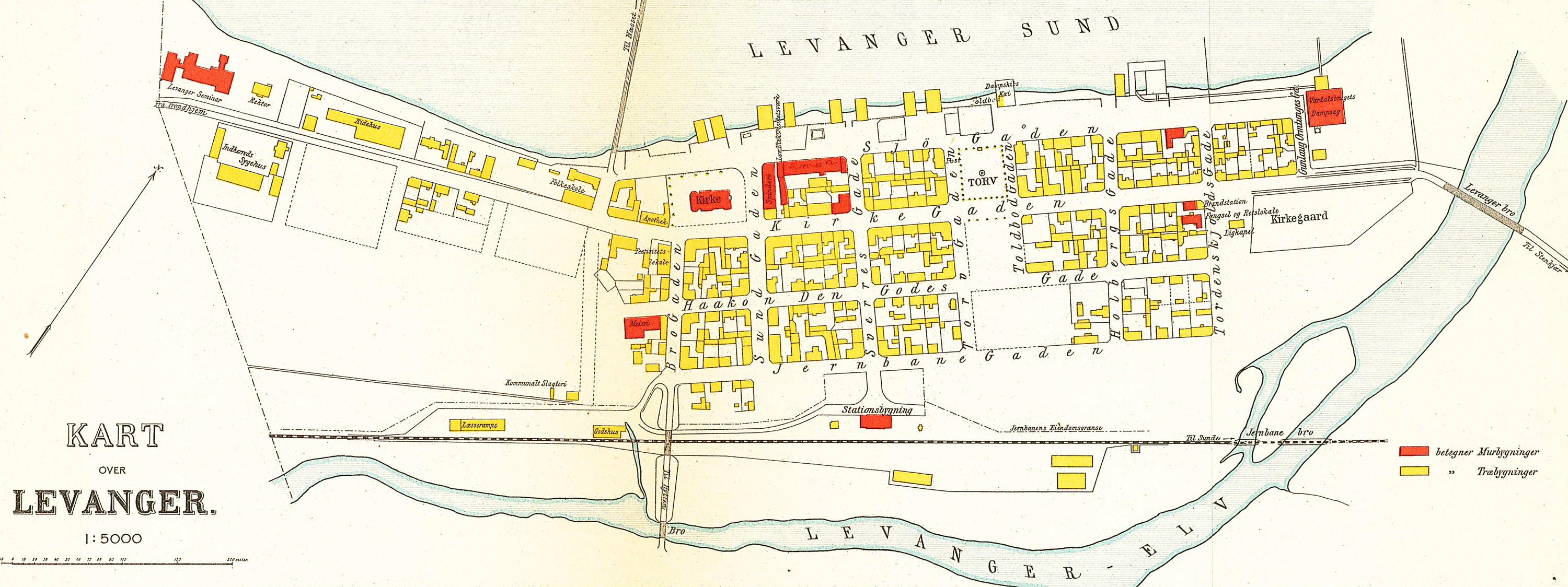
Levanger map from 1909. The teachers' seminary is the leftmost red building.

== See also ==
- List of forestry universities and colleges
