= National Driving Teacher School =

The National Driving Teacher School (Norwegian: Statens trafikklærerskole) was a vocational school which trained teachers for driver's education. The school was established in 1970 by the Ministry of Church Affairs and Education and was originally situated in Oslo. It moved to Stjørdal Municipality in 1973. On 1 January 2004, it became a division and campus of Nord-Trøndelag University College. Starting in 1988 the school has used the Lånkebanen circuit.
