= Yugra State University =

Education organization in Khanty-Mansiysk, Russia

- Югорский государственный университет
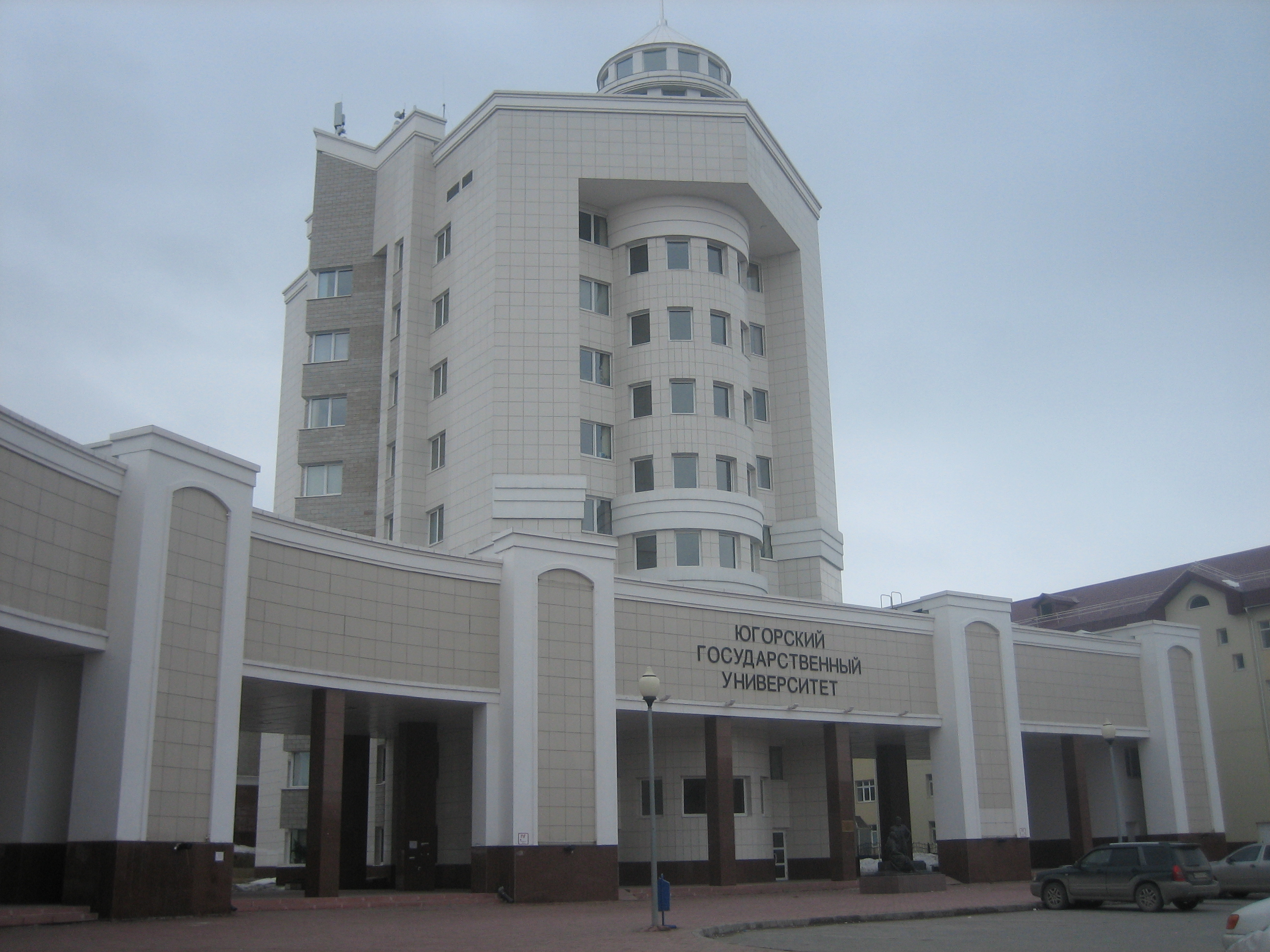
- Type: public
- Established: 2001
- Rector: Roman Kuchin
- Students: 3200
- Location: 16 Tchekhova Street, Khanty-Mansiysk, Khanty-Mansi Autonomous Okrug, Russia; 61°00′04″N 69°01′48″E
- Campus: urban
- Website: ugrasu.ru

The Yugra State University (YUSU; Russian: Югорский государственный университет, ЮГУ) is a public university in Khanty-Mansiysk, Russia.

== History ==
The university was founded in 2001 by the initiative of the Government of Khanty-Mansi Autonomous Okrug on the basis of branches of educational institutions that existed in Khanty-Mansiysk: the Tyumen State Agricultural Academy, the Nizhnevartovsk State Pedagogical Institute, and the Siberian State Automobile and Highway Academy.

In 2003, a new main building was built for the university. At that time it became the tallest building in Khanty-Mansiysk. In 2007, the university included the following state educational institutions: the Surgut Petroleum Technical School, the Nizhnevartovsk Petroleum Technical School, the Lyantor Petroleum Technical School, and the Nefteyugansk Industrial College. They became branches of the YUSU. In 2013, the university became a center for training the Olympics 2014 volunteers.

== International collaboration ==
The university is a member of the University of the Arctic. UArctic is an international cooperative network based in the Circumpolar Arctic region, consisting of more than 200 universities, colleges, and other organizations with an interest in promoting education and research in the Arctic region. The collaboration has been paused after the beginning of the Russo-Ukrainian War in 2022.
