= Nord University =

University in Northern Norway

- Nord universitet (Norwegian); Nuortta universitiehtta (Lule Sami); Noerhte universiteete (Southern Sami)
- Former names: University of Nordland
- Type: Public research university
- Established: 2016; 10 years ago, 1994; 32 years ago, 1892; 134 years ago
- Affiliations: SEA-EU; The Arctic Six
- Rector: Hanne Solheim Hansen
- Administrative staff: 1,300
- Students: 11,004
- Location: Bodø, Nordland, Norway; 67°17′15″N 14°33′30″E
- Campus: Main campuses in Bodø and Levanger.
- Colors: Teal
- Website: www.nord.no

Nord University (Norwegian: Nord universitet; Lule Sami: Nuortta universitiehtta; Southern Sami: Noerhte universiteete) is a state university in Nordland and Trøndelag counties of Norway. As of 2024, it is the second-largest research and educational institution in Northern Norway with more than 11,000 students at study locations in Northern and Central Norway, with main campuses in Bodø, the capital of the county of Nordland, and Levanger, a university town on the south shore of the Trondheim Fjord. Other campuses are located in Mo i Rana, Namsos, Nesna, Sandnessjøen, Steinkjer, Stjørdalshalsen, and Vesterålen.

The university is committed to educational and research programmes, with a focus on blue and green growth, innovation and entrepreneurship, as well as welfare, health and education. Nord University offers 180 programmes within both academic and professional studies, including aquaculture, sociology, business education, nurse education, and teacher education.

The university is named after the Norwegian word for North, Nord, to emphasise its devotion to northern regions. As a member of the University of the Arctic, an international cooperative network with an interest in promoting education and research in the Arctic, Nord University serves as a hub offering circumpolar studies and participating in the exchange program north2north.

== History ==
Established in its current form on 1 January 2016 following a resolution of 9 October 2015 by the King-in-Council, Nord University is the successor of the University of Nordland (est. 2011), Nesna University College (est. 1994), and Nord-Trøndelag University College (est. 1994). The latter colleges originated as Nesna Teachers' College (test. 1918), and Levanger Teachers' College (est. 1892). The latter institution was a direct successor of the Klæbu Teacher's College (est. 1839).

== Faculties ==
=== Faculty of Biosciences and Aquaculture ===
The Faculty of Biosciences and Aquaculture (FBA) promotes sustainable and innovative development in order to meet global challenges related to food production, climate and the environment. The Faculty is an international arena for education, research and knowledge dissemination, with staff members and students from over 25 countries. The Faculty offers a doctoral programme (PhD) within aquatic biosciences.

The Faculty of Biosciences and Aquaculture has 800 students and 130 staff members in Bodø and Steinkjer. The teaching and research community comprises three academic divisions:

- Aquaculture
- Ecology, Genomics and Animal Science
- Production and Welfare.

=== Faculty of Education and Arts ===
The Faculty of Education and Arts (FLU) educates teachers from preschool to upper secondary school, and within sports, culture, and the fine arts. Research in the faculty emphasizes the teaching profession and professional teaching practices. FLU offers a doctoral program (PhD) in the study of professional praxis. Beyond its teacher training programs, the faculty also provides full bachelor degrees in disciplines such as Sports Science and English Literature. It also offers a range of Master degrees, including Speech Therapy and Music.

The Faculty of Education and Arts has 3500 students, and 350 academic faculty and administrative staff members in Bodø, Levanger, Vesterålen, and Nesna. The teaching and research community comprises eight academic divisions:

- Teacher Education
- Pre-School Teacher Education
- Language and Literature
- Arts and Culture
- Physical Education, Sports and Outdoor Life
- Pedagogy and Special Education
- Social Studies and Religion, Philosophy & Ethics
- Science

The Faculty of Education and Arts is also host to several centres:

- Norwegian Centre for Arts and Culture in Education
- Centre for Saami and Indigenous Studies
- National Competence Centre for Culture, Health, and Care
- Centre for Special Education Research and Inclusion
- Centre for Education for Sustainable Development and Global Citizenship

=== Faculty of Nursing and Health Sciences ===
The Faculty of Nursing and Health Sciences (FSH) educates nurses and specialists within healthcare and practice-based research. The faculty offers an interfaculty doctoral programme (PhD) within professional praxis.

The Faculty of Nursing and Health Sciences has 2400 students and 200 staff members. The teaching and research community comprises three academic divisions:

- Nursing
- Pharmacy
- Social Education and Mental Health

=== Faculty of Social Science ===
The Faculty of Social Science (FSV) focuses on welfare, development and communication. The Faculty offers a doctoral programme (PhD) within sociology.

The Faculty of Social Science has 1800 students and 100 staff members. The teaching and research community comprises four academic divisions:

- Welfare and Social Relations
- History, Culture and Media
- Management and Innovation
- International Relations, Circumpolar Studies and Environment

=== Business School ===
Nord University Business School (HHN) prioritizes cooperation with business and industry, the public sector, and the community, to provide relevant education at the bachelor, master, and doctorate levels. The faculty offers a doctoral programme (PhD) within business management.

Nord Business School has 2800 students and 230 staff members. The teaching and research community comprises four academic divisions:

- Innovation and Entrepreneurship
- Markets, Strategy and Management
- Economic Analysis and Accounting
- Traffic

HHN also includes the Center for High North Logistics .

==== High North Center ====
The High North Center, which runs in the HHN, is a national center for research, education and policy development in the High North of Norway. The center recognizes and develops innovation, business creation and politics. It was established in 2007 to focus on assisting companies, organizations and public institutions to increase both awareness and commitment in the High North. The center's leader is Frode Mellemvik.

== Academics ==
Most of the programmes at Nord University are taught in Norwegian, but the institution does offer a growing range of options both taught and administered in English:

=== PhD Degrees in English ===
- PhD in Aquatic Biosciences
- PhD in Business
- PhD in the Study of Professional Praxis
- PhD in Sociology

=== Master Degrees in English ===
- Business
- Biosciences
- Nordic Master in Sustainable Production and Utilization of Marine Bioresources

=== Bachelor Degrees in English ===
- Animal Science
- Biology
- Circumpolar Studies
- English Language and Literature
- Games and Entertainment Technology
- Film and Television production

=== One-Year Programmes in English ===
- Circumpolar Studies
- English Language and Literature
- Norwegian Language and Society

=== One-Semester Programmes in English ===
- Advanced English Language and Literature
- Adventure Knowledge
- Aquaculture and Marine Biosciences
- Business
- Ecology and Arctic Marine Biology
- Experience English Language and Literature
- Extreme Environments
- International Marketing
- Introduction to Norwegian society, welfare, development and language
- Molecular Biosciences
- Nordic Politics and Society
- Nordic and International Perspectives on Teaching and Learning

=== Single Courses in English ===
In addition to the established programme packages, students may choose from a selection of courses taught in English, which include (among others):

- Business English
- History, Politics, and Northern Resources
- International Entrepreneurship
- Literature and Environmental Catastrophe
- Management
- Security Politics
- Shakespeare and his World
- The Nordic Societies

== See also ==
- Higher education in Norway
