= Nordisk Fond for Miljø og Udvikling =

Danish charity

Nordisk Fond for Miljø og Udvikling is a Danish non-profit charity foundation. The foundation is headquartered in Copenhagen, Denmark.

Founded in 1990, the Nordisk Fond for Miljø og Udvikling has the declared goal of supporting local, innovative conservation and development initiatives in remote communities.

Aside from its small grants programme, Nordisk Fond for Miljø og Udvikling carries out independent research. See for instance http://onlinelibrary.wiley.com/doi/10.1111/j.1755-263X.2010.00159.x/full

The Nordisk Fond for Miljø og Udvikling is a member of the NGO Network of the Global Environment Facility, a volunteer structure of GEF-accredited organisations. See http://www.gefngo.org/formmaster.cfm?&menuid=12&action=view&orgid=688&preaction=main

It is also an active member of the University of the Arctic. UArctic is an international cooperative network based in the Circumpolar Arctic region, consisting of more than 200 universities, colleges, and other organizations with an interest in promoting education and research in the Arctic region.
