= Farida Ahmadi =

Afghan author and women's rights activist (born 1957)

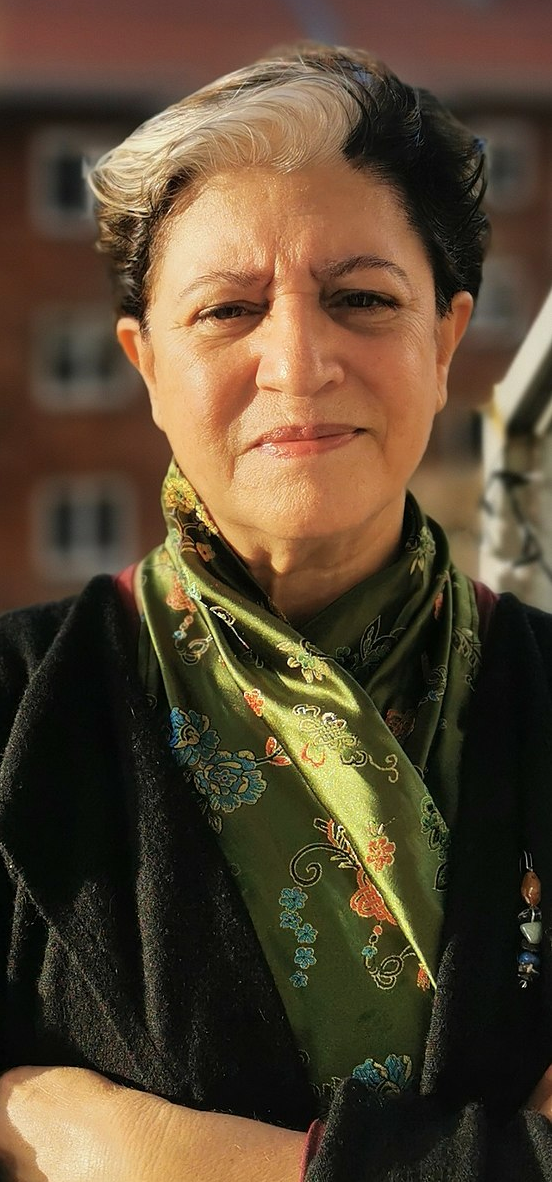
- Ahmadi in 2022
- Born: 26 March 1957 (age 69); Kabul, Afghanistan
- Education: Kabul University; University of Oslo; Nordic Women's University (PhD)
- Occupations: author, speaker and women's rights activist
- Organization(s): evolutionary Association of Women of Afghanistan; Women against Fundamentalism
- Notable work: Silent Screams (2008); From War to Peace: Our Global Responsibility! (2024)
- Website: www.faridaahmadi.com/en/

Farida Ahmadi (Dari: فریده احمدی; born 26 March 1957) is an Afghan author and women's rights activist, living in Norway. She was imprisoned and tortured during the Soviet–Afghan War and was a leading member of the Revolutionary Association of Women of Afghanistan. She founded the organisation "Women against Fundamentalism" in Norway.

== Biography ==
Ahmadi was born 26 March 1957 in Kabul, Afghanistan. Her medical education at Kabul University was interrupted by the Soviet invasion of Kabul during the Soviet–Afghan War.

Ahmadi a leading member of the Revolutionary Association of Women of Afghanistan. She was accused of distributing "anti-Soviet" resistance literature and was arrested in 1981. At the time of her arrest she was a fourth year medical student. She was detained for six months and was tortured by electrocution, denial of sleep and continual interrogation in the Criminal Investigation Department in Afghanistan. She witnessed the torture of other political prisoners.

After her release, Ahmadi participated in the Permanent Peoples' Tribunal session "Afghanistan Il" on 16 December 1982 in Paris, France. She also spoke about her treatment at a conference in New York, USA. She provided the names of the individuals responsible for her torture. Her case was cited in the entry on Afghanistan of Amnesty International's Annual Report 1982.

In 1983, Ahmadi, along with a delegation of Afghan freedom fighters met President Ronald Reagan, she was the only woman in the delegation.

For her women's rights and pro-democracy campaigning, Ahmadi was also arrested in Quetta, Balochistan, Pakistan, and was imprisoned in Pakistan in 1989. Amnesty International worked for her release from prison.

Ahmadi fled to Norway as a refugee in 1991, firstly to a refugee reception centre in Haugesund, then later to Oslo where she permanently settled. She studied a master's degree in social anthropology at the University of Oslo. She then completed a PhD thesis on Immigrant women's reality in Norwegian society at the Nordic Women's University.

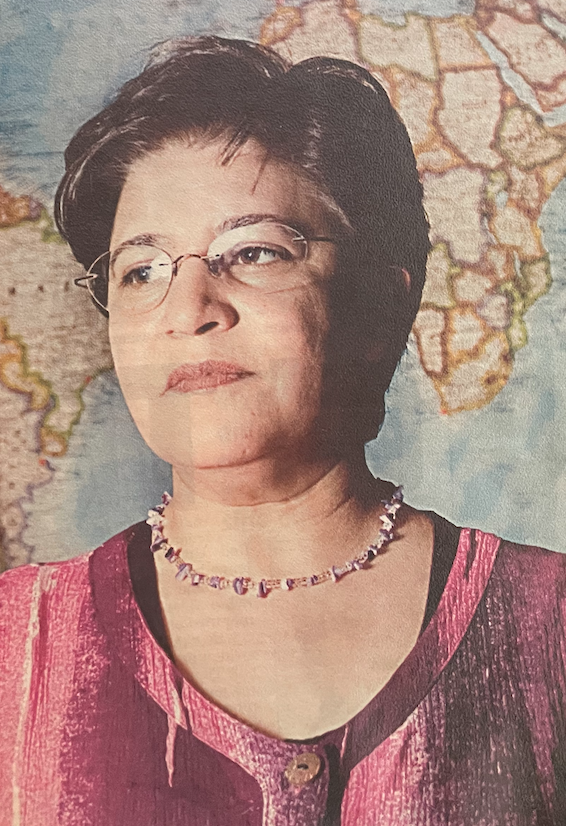
Farida Ahmadi

In 1994, Ahmadi founded the organisation "Women against Fundamentalism" in Norway. She co-authored the conference paper "Corruption and economic development: A critical review of literature" with Fredoun Z. Ahmadi-Esfahani.

In 2008, Ahmadi published the book Silent Screams, which describes the experiences of immigrant women. She translated her book into Persian and it has been turned into a physical theatre production by Norwegian and Japanese artists.

Ahmadi published From War to Peace: Our Global Responsibility! in 2024 and gave a talk about her writing at the London Book Fair in 2025.
