= Centre for High North Logistics =

Norwegian foundation focusing on logistics solutions in the Arctic region

Coordinates: 69°43′40″N 30°2′29″E

Centre for High North Logistics AS
- Formation: May 27, 2009; 17 years ago
- Type: Public–private partnership
- Legal status: Foundation
- Purpose: Exploration of logistics solutions in the Arctic region
- Headquarters: Kirkenes, Finnmark, Norway
- Website: http://www.chnl.no/

Centre for High North Logistics (CHNL, Norwegian: Senter for nordområdelogistikk) is a Norwegian foundation which works to investigate ways to develop logistics solutions in the Arctic region.

Among the aims of the centre is that of collecting information to facilitate an opening up of the Northern Sea Route from the Atlantic Ocean to the Pacific Ocean. The administration of the center is located in Kirkenes on the north-eastern Barents Sea coast of Norway.

== Organization ==
The Centre for High North Logistics was founded on 27 May 2009, subsuming its precursor organization which was established in 2008 and administered by Bodø University College.

The leadership of the foundation includes Felix Tschudi (Tschudi Shipping Company) as chairman of the board and Tom Tjomsland (Norwegian Shipowners' Association), Frode Mellemvik (Bodø University College) and Jon Rysst (Det Norske Veritas) as board members. Tschudi's board membership is guaranteed by the foundation's establishing charter. The foreign ministry has a permanent seat on the board as observer. These four organizations also constitute the founders of the Centre for High North Logistics.

The foundation is organized as a 5-year project scheduled to end by 2013. In January 2011 the status of the foundation was changed from an ordinary foundation to a business foundation. In the application Felix Tschudi, as chairman of the board, wrote to Stiftelsestilsynet, the Norwegian inspection agency for foundations, that "The foundation will conduct business in the form of advisory activities [...]. The advisory enterprise may consist of payable platform of knowhow, and in the form of being an information and agency bureau". Notwithstanding, three months later the foreign ministry made the payment of the last NOK 1,500,000 (approx. US$250,000 as of April 2012) to the foundation.

== Funding ==
The funding for the foundation's work was decided before its germinal startup in 2008 to require about NOK 20,000,000 (approx. US$3,000,000 as of April 2012). 6 million has been received as a grant from the Ministry of Foreign Affairs and following revelations in the Norwegian media in the spring of 2012 has caused intense scrutiny of the case proceedings and widespread and severe criticism of foreign minister Jonas Gahr Støre on grounds of conflict of interest. The issue at hand hinges on the close personal relationship between Støre and Felix Tschudi and Støre not acknowledging, or even calling for an assessment of, a possible impartiality issue existing. Another 6 million was provided by Tschudi Shipping Company.

In April 2012 the foundation announced that it would be running out of money in December 2013. This was said during a visit to the center from the Ministry of Trade and Industry, however the ministry representative emphasized that the center has been supported by the foreign ministry, and that that ministry would support the center until 2013.

=== Founding Partner program ===
In October 2009 the board decided to employ a strategy of attracting funds by awarding companies that would contribute a substantial amount (preferably NOK 1,200,000 (approx. US$210,000 as of April 2012)) annually over a five-year period the status of "Founding Partner". This would also entitle these companies to several privileges, such as "access to an international political network at a high level". Other rights that would be afforded to Founding Partners would be:

- Board membership
- Opportunity to influence strategy and fiscal priorities
- Opportunity to define concrete knowhow and research projects
- Early access to information within the foundation's network

Companies that were intended as Founding Partners included Wilh. Wilhelmsen and Leif Höegh & Co.

Although this is documented in the protocol from this board meeting, which was also sent to the foreign ministry, Felix Tschudi has denied that this strategy was ever implemented. He explained that this meeting took place six months following the foundation's establishment and that the board at that time was working to attract more financial contributors to what was in fact a new type of public–private partnership. Tschudi maintained that the protocol from one meeting has been taken out of context, and that this was merely a sketch for how the center could become a permanent organization after the first five years as a project organization. He said that in 2009/2010 there were still few companies with sufficient interests in the North to join in with large sums and the board therefore decided to put the "Founding Partners" program on ice and instead focus on activities and projects that could visualize the possibilities and the needs for logistics in the North. The disclosure about the Founding Partners program was given in an article in the Norwegian newspaper Dagbladet on April 14, 2012. In it the newspaper also refers to a PowerPoint presentation from February 2010 where both Tschudi Shipping Company and Det Norske Veritas were named as "Founding Partners".
