= Finnish Institute of Occupational Health =

The Finnish Institute of Occupational Health (FIOH, in Finnish Työterveyslaitos) is an organization that promotes the positive aspects of working life and helps to minimise the drawbacks. FIOH does so by studying how health, well-being and safety at work can be best promoted such as having a healthy organisation or a sound safety culture at work. FIOH also studies which risks in working life can cause adverse health effects such as exposure to chemicals at work and which interventions help best to minimise these risks such as ventilation or personal protective equipment.

It is a body governed by public law and operates under the administrative sector of the Finnish Ministry of Social Affairs and Health. Its operations are based on multidisciplinary research and development. Its research results are applied to workplace practices via consultancy services, by training and by advising policy makers. FIOH’s objective is for work to promote, rather than endanger, health and functional capacity.

About 55% of FIOH’s budget is state-funded, and 45% is self-generated through, for example, EU research funding and the sales of specialist advisory services.

== Operations ==
FIOH has regional offices in Helsinki, Kuopio, Oulu, Tampere and Turku. Headquarters are located in Helsinki. The total number of employees amount to approximately 500. FIOH was founded in 1945. It closely collaborates with other major stakeholders in the field of occupational health such as the World Health Organization (WHO) and the International Labour Office (ILO).

FIOH hosted the Cochrane Work Review Group in Kuopio until 21 May 2019. The group is part of the worldwide not-for-profit research organisation Cochrane and moved to the University Medical Center in Amsterdam the Netherlands. The reasons that FIOH stopped the funding for the Cochrane Work Review Group remained unclear but it was most probably that the then FIOH management found the results of the systematic reviews inconvenient because not always supportive of the policy of the Ministry of Social Affairs and Health which funds FIOH.

== History ==
FIOH’s predecessor was the department of occupational diseases of the Helsinki General Hospital, which was based on the initiative of the National Board of Health and founded on 4.4.1945. This department specialized in the research and treatment of occupational diseases. The Occupational Health Foundation was founded to fund this field, the rules of which were ratified on 26.6.1945. This private foundation in turn established the Finnish Institute of Occupational Health, which began operations on 1.1.1950, financially supported and aided by the state. FIOH was nationalized in a contract between the State and the Foundation and became an independent body governed by public law operating under the Ministry of Social Affairs and Health on 1.7.1978.

FIOH’s directors: Leo Noro, 1950–1970 and Martti J. Karvonen, 1970–1974, followed by director generals Jorma Rantanen, 1974–2003 and Harri Vainio, 2003-2015. Antti Koivula is the Director General since August 2015.

== Partnerships ==
FIOH is an active member of the University of the Arctic. UArctic is an international cooperative network based in the Circumpolar Arctic region, consisting of more than 200 universities, colleges, and other organizations with an interest in promoting education and research in the Arctic region.
