= University Centre of the Westfjords =

Educational institution in Isafjordur, Iceland

Coordinates: 66°04′08″N 23°07′34″W

- Háskólasetur Vestfjarða
- Established: 2005
- Affiliations: University of Akureyri; University of the Arctic
- Director: Peter Weiss (2005-2025); Catherine P. Chambers (2026-present)
- Location: Ísafjörður, Iceland
- Colors: Red, Blue
- Website: www.uw.is

The University Centre of the Westfjords (Icelandic: Háskólasetur Vestfjarða) is a higher education and research institute located in Ísafjörður, Iceland. It offers integrated master's programmes in Coastal and Marine Management, Marine Innovation and Regional Development, in cooperation with the University of Akureyri, as well as courses in Icelandic language.

== History ==
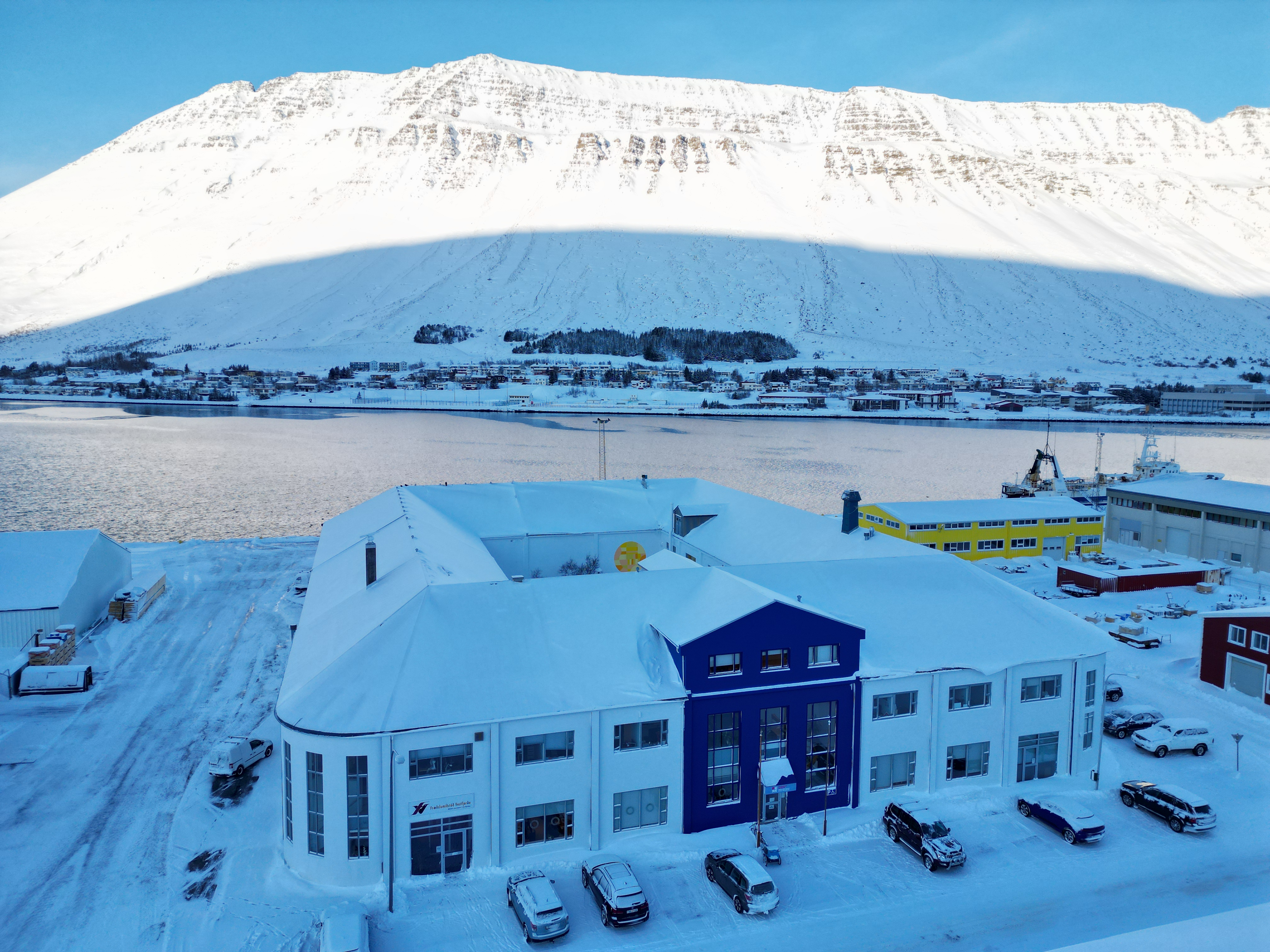
University Centre building in Winter

The centre was established on 12 March 2005 in Ísafjörður, a town of circa 3,000 inhabitants on the western coast of Iceland. Its first director was Peter Weiss. In August 2025, the University Centre of the Westfjords announced the appointment of Dr. Catherine P. Chambers as the new Director and began her new role in April 2026, after returning from a sabbatical as a guest professor at the University of Tokyo Atmospheric and Oceanic Research Institute.

== International collaboration ==
The university is an active member of the University of the Arctic. UArctic is an international cooperative network based in the Circumpolar Arctic region, consisting of more than 200 universities, colleges, and other organizations with an interest in promoting education and research in the Arctic region.

The university participates in UArctic's mobility program north2north. The aim of that program is to enable students of member institutions to study in different parts of the North.
