= Arctic Basecamp =

Science communication non-profit focused on climate change

Arctic Basecamp is a not-for-profit science outreach organisation. It was founded in 2017. It works to promote awareness of the global risks of climate change in the Arctic to world leaders from business, policy and civil society.

== World Economic Forum at Davos ==
Arctic Basecamp hosts an annual event at Davos alongside the World Economic Forum’s Annual Meeting. An expedition tent acts as its workplace during the day and its dormitory at night, with scientists and campaigners camping in sub-zero temperatures.

== COP26 ==
In 2021, Arctic Basecamp brought an iceberg from Greenland to COP26 in Glasgow to highlight climate change in the Arctic.

== Controversies ==
Arctic Basecamp is funded by Quadriture Climate Group, a charity linked to fossil fuel investments. Despite the organisation's message, there is no evidence that they have influential engagement with decisionmakers.

== Key people ==
Arctic Basecamp was founded by Professor Gail Whiteman, Professor of Sustainability at the University of Exeter’s Business School. Arctic Basecamp’s scientific advisers include Professor Julienne Stroeve, Professor of Polar Observation and Modelling at UCL, Dr Jennifer Francis, Acting Deputy Director at Woodwell Climate Research Center, Professor Alun Hubbard, a glaciologist and climate scientist at the Arctic University of Norway, Professor Jason Box, Professor of Glaciology and Climate at the Geologic Survey of Denmark and Greenland, Dr Jennifer Watts, an Assistant Scientist at Woodwell Climate Research Center, Dr Dmitry Yumashev, a climate policy specialist, and Dr Susana Hancock, an Arctic climate researcher.

Celebrities who have supported Arctic Basecamp’s work include Rainn Wilson who is a member of the Advisory Board of Arctic Basecamp, Greta Thunberg, Ellie Goulding, Lily Cole, Billie Eilish, Robert Downey Jr., and Chuck Tatham.

== Arctic Risk Platform ==
In 2022, Arctic Basecamp launched the Arctic Risk Platform, a website publishing live scientific data from the Arctic.
