= Center for Northern Studies =

Coordinates: 44.587132°N 72.436568°W

The Center for Northern Studies (CNS) in Wolcott in the U.S. state of Vermont was founded in 1971 by Steven B. Young as an interdisciplinary study center focused on the natural and human systems of the Circumpolar North, including the cultures and environments of Arctic Canada, Alaska, Scandinavia and Siberia.

CNS offered semester and year-long opportunities for undergraduates interested in exploring northern issues, with northern field experiences incorporated into all semester programs. Courses ranged from field biology to cultural anthropology of Circumpolar cultures to northern archaeology. The center also offered field study courses in Bear Swamp, an extensive tract of boreal forest wetland adjacent to the CNS facilities, which included classrooms, a laboratory, and a specialized Polar research library, which was open to the public. The Center operated as an independent non-profit until 2003 when CNS merged with Sterling College in Craftsbury Common, Vermont. The Center for Northern Studies at Sterling College operated from 2003 until 2010, when Sterling College phased out the focus on Northern Studies. The CNS facilities were sold in 2012, with Sterling College retaining ownership of Bear Swamp.
