= Nesna University College =

Former university college in Nordland, Norway

- Høgskolen i Nesna
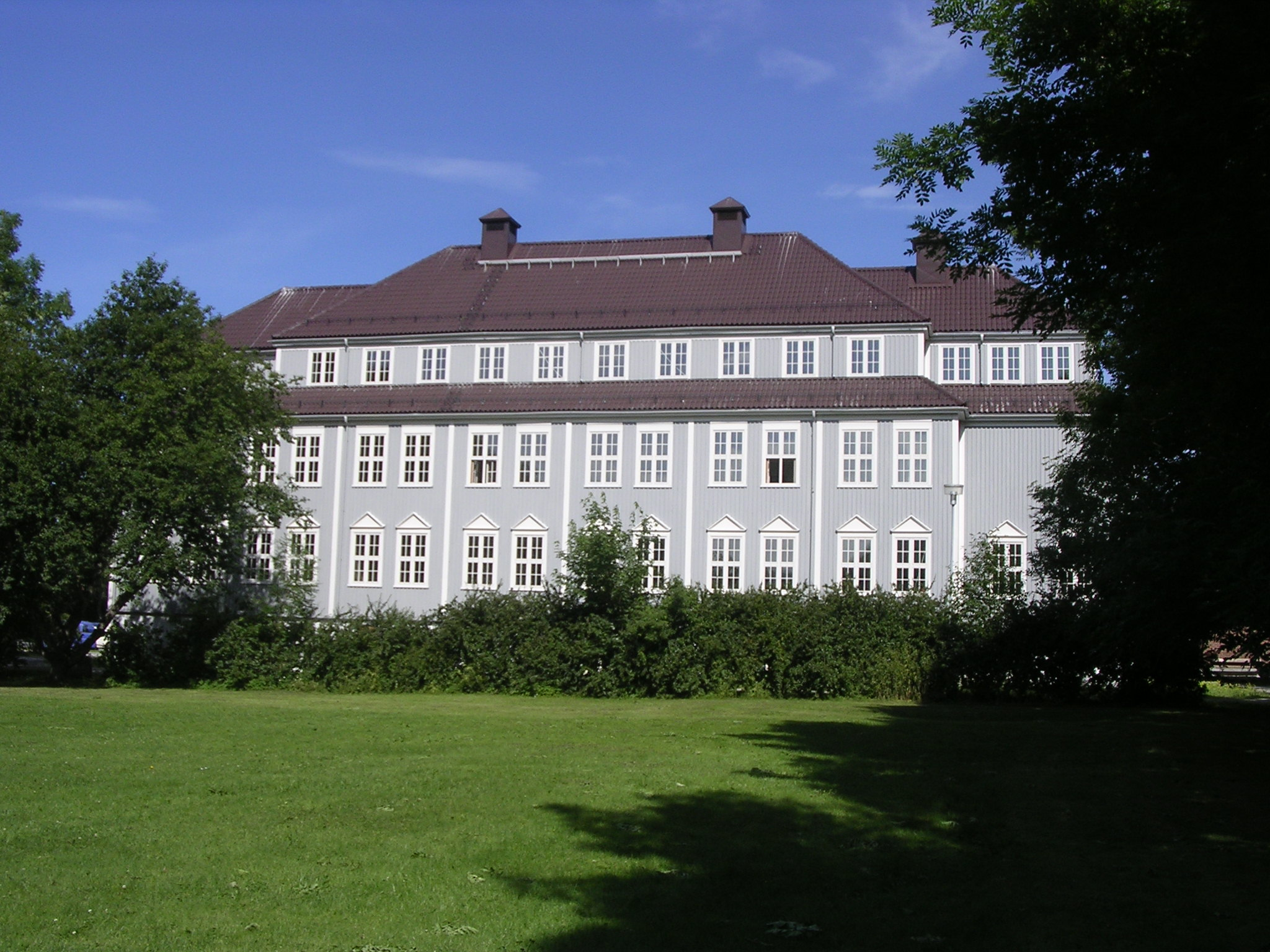
- View of the old building
- Former names: Nesna lærerhøgskole
- Type: University college
- Established: 1918/1994
- Rector: Sven Erik Forfang
- Students: 1,200
- Location: Nesna, Nordland, Norway; 66.197516°N 13.028877°E
- Website: http://www.hinesna.no

Nesna University College (Norwegian: Høgskolen i Nesna or HiNe) was a university college, a Norwegian state institution of higher education, until it became part of Nord University in 2016. Its campus was in the village of Nesna in Nesna Municipality. In April 2019, the university board of directors proposed a measure to close this campus by 2022 and in May 2019, the campus was closed by order of the health and safety representative effective immediately. This led to large student protests and demonstrations primarily directed against the closure, but also as a broader protest against the municipal and region mergers put into effect by the Solberg Cabinet.

== History ==
It was established in 1918 as Nesna Teachers' College, and was reorganised as a state university college on 1 August 1994 following the university college reform. Until 2016, it was one of the 24 Norwegian state university colleges.

The university college had approximately 1200 students and 130 employees. The original teachers' college was established in 1918 by the local priest, Ivar Hjellvik, making it the second oldest institution of higher education in Northern Norway. This university college had permanent satellite campuses in the neighboring towns of Mo i Rana and Sandnessjøen. Nesna University College hosts the Nordic Women's University.

== See also ==
- University college (Scandinavia)
