= University of the Arctic =

Consortium of educational organizations

- Motto: "With Shared Voices"
- Type: Cooperative network
- Established: 2001
- President: Lars Kullerud
- Location: Rovaniemi, Finland (International Secretariat), Canada, Denmark, Finland, Iceland, Norway, Russia, Sweden, United States
- Website: www.uarctic.org

The University of the Arctic (UArctic) is an international cooperative network based in the Circumpolar Arctic region, consisting of universities, colleges, and other organizations with an interest in promoting education and research in the Arctic region.

UArctic was launched in 2001, endorsed by the Arctic Council and in conjunction with the tenth anniversary of the Rovaniemi Process and the Arctic Environmental Protection Strategy.

== Member institutions ==
There are 197 members in the University of the Arctic as of April 2025. There are 45 members from Canada, 10 from Denmark, 1 from the Faroe Islands, 17 from Finland, 3 from Greenland, 10 from Iceland, 19 from Norway, 55 (paused) from Russia, 7 from Sweden, 25 from the United States and 59 from non-Arctic countries (Australia (1), Austria (1), Czech Republic (1), China (16), Chile (1), France (3), Germany (1), India (5), Ireland (3), Italy (1), Japan (1), Korea (2), Mongolia (1), the Netherlands (2) and the United Kingdom (21), plus the International Polar Foundation).

Most UArctic members are higher education institutions, but other members include circumpolar Indigenous organizations and research institutions.

In April 2022, following the Russian invasion of Ukraine, the Board of UArctic decided to put the memberships of all institutions of the Russian Federation on pause.

== History ==
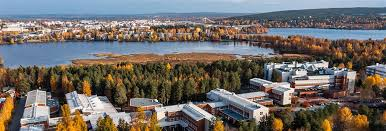
UArctic International Secretariat at the University of Lapland in Rovaniemi, Finland.

The University of the Arctic was initially launched by the Arctic Council on June 12, 2001, in Rovaniemi, Finland. However, the initiative can be traced back to 1997, when the council asked the Circumpolar Universities Association (CUA) for a feasibility study and started implementing the first steps towards the establishment of UArctic. A UArctic Circumpolar Coordination Office was for instance put in place in 1999 in Rovaniemi, which later became the International Secretariat. The academic programs of UArctic were also developed during this period.

In 2002, Lars Kullerud was appointed UArctic Director. First students took Circumpolar Studies courses or went on exchanges via the north2north program. During that year, the network was also granted an official observer status at the Arctic Council.

Besides the International Secretariat, several offices were created during the first decade. In 2003, an office was launched at the University of Saskatchewan in Canada to coordinate the Circumpolar Studies program. The following year, a north2north Mobility office was established at Finnmark University College in Norway, and a Thematic Coordination Office was established in 2005 at the University of Oulu in Finland. Russia welcomed two offices as well in the years 2006 and 2008 (the UArctic Russian Information Center at the North-Eastern Federal University of Yakutsk and the UArctic Research Office at the Northern Federal University in Arkhangelsk).

The first UArctic Rectors’ Forum was held in 2007 at Dartmouth College. IASC, IASSA, and UArctic signed an agreement on research cooperation in the Arctic in 2011. The first non-Arctic members joined UArctic that same year. Regional centres have been established acting as hubs for the coordination of new memberships in different regions (for example, the University of Versailles Saint-Quentin-en-Yvelines in France is a regional centre for Western Europe). In 2014, the organisation of UArctic was rethought. A new management structure with a president and vice-presidents (VP Finance, VP Mobility, VP Indigenous etc.) was adopted. Lars Kullerud, former UArctic Director, took on the responsibility of UArctic President. In 2016, Saint-Petersburg hosted the first UArctic Congress. Congresses bring together all UArctic bodies (which were at that time the board, the council and the rectors’ forum) in addition to being scientific conferences. The next year, UArctic became a partner organisation of UNESCO. In 2019, UArctic registered as a non-profit association in Finland. The network is officially registered as UArctic Association ry from then on.

Collaboration with member institutions located in Russia has been paused since 2022 after the outbreak of the war in Ukraine. In the words of Kullerud: “The UArctic Board condemns all acts of war. As a result of the current Russian military actions in Ukraine, the collaboration between UArctic and Russian institutions is paused until the situation allows for continuation.”

The latest institutional development was the appointment of UArctic Chairs in 2022. UArctic chairs are highly qualified academics who implement and drive collaborative actions in research and education among members.

== Organization, governance, and administration ==
The University of the Arctic is governed by a structure in which the member institutions are represented through various mechanisms. UArctic is registered as a non-profit association in Finland.

=== Governance ===
==== Assembly ====
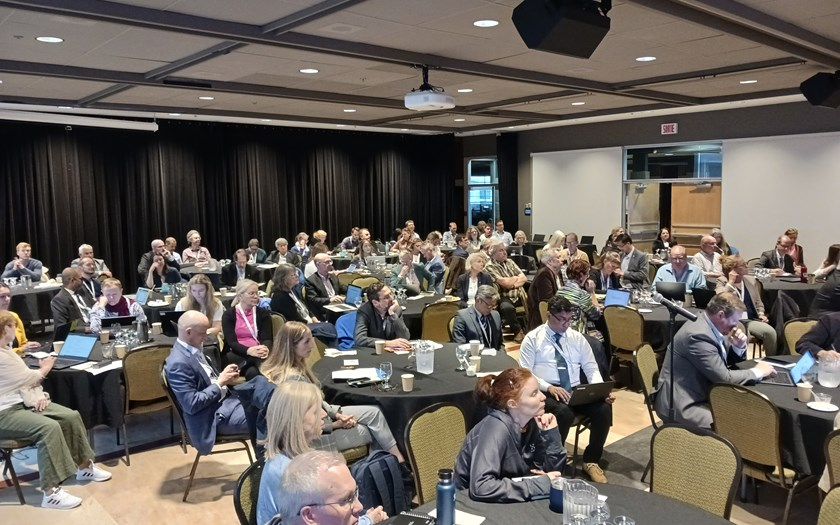
2023 UArctic Assembly Meeting in Quebec City, Canada

UArctic members gather every year for the UArctic Assembly. The Assembly consists of all members, represented by one representative and one alternate representative. During elections, Arctic Member votes count more than Non-Arctic Member votes. It is UArctic’s most important legislative body. An extraordinary Assembly can be organised when a specific matter must be handled. Otherwise, the Assembly Executive Committee Toyon may make interim decisions. The Assembly can form other committees to get for example assistance in nomination or membership processes. Every second year, the Assembly is held during the UArctic Congress. The congress brings different UArctic bodies together with an academic conference.

==== Board ====
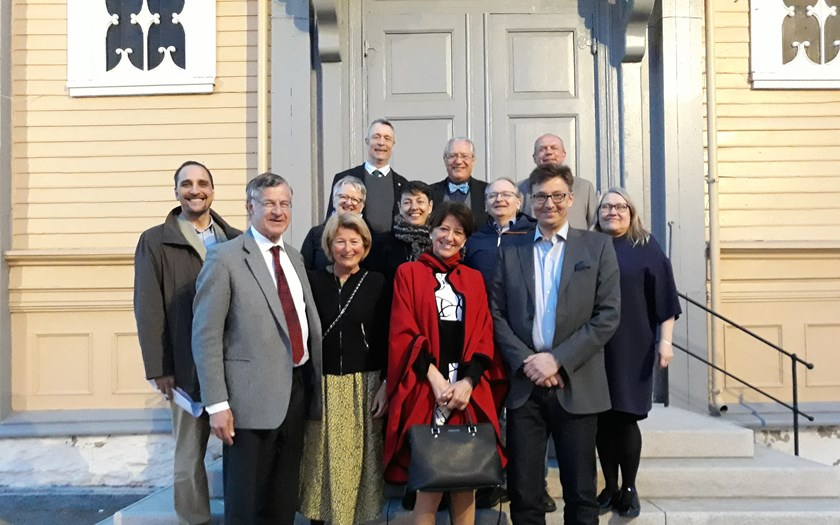
UArctic Board meeting in Tromsø, Norway in April 2019

The Assembly elects the UArctic Board. The Board is responsible for setting priorities, institutional accountability, personnel, finances, and budgeting, as well as public and external relations. The Board also has a Board Executive preparing the agenda and text proposals for Board meetings in addition of making interim decisions.

==== Other non-governing bodies ====
Some top meetings are organised without having any governing function, as the Rectors’ Forum, which brings together different heads of member institutions.

=== Administration ===
The President, the Vice-Presidents, the Secretary General, and the CCO regularly meet as the UArctic Senior Leadership Ma-Mawi. They are held responsible for ensuring the daily operations of the network and overseeing the administrative staff. Nonetheless, UArctic’s staff is directly hired by host institutions on behalf of UArctic. For instance, the University of Lapland hosts the International Secretariat.

==== President and Vice-Presidents ====
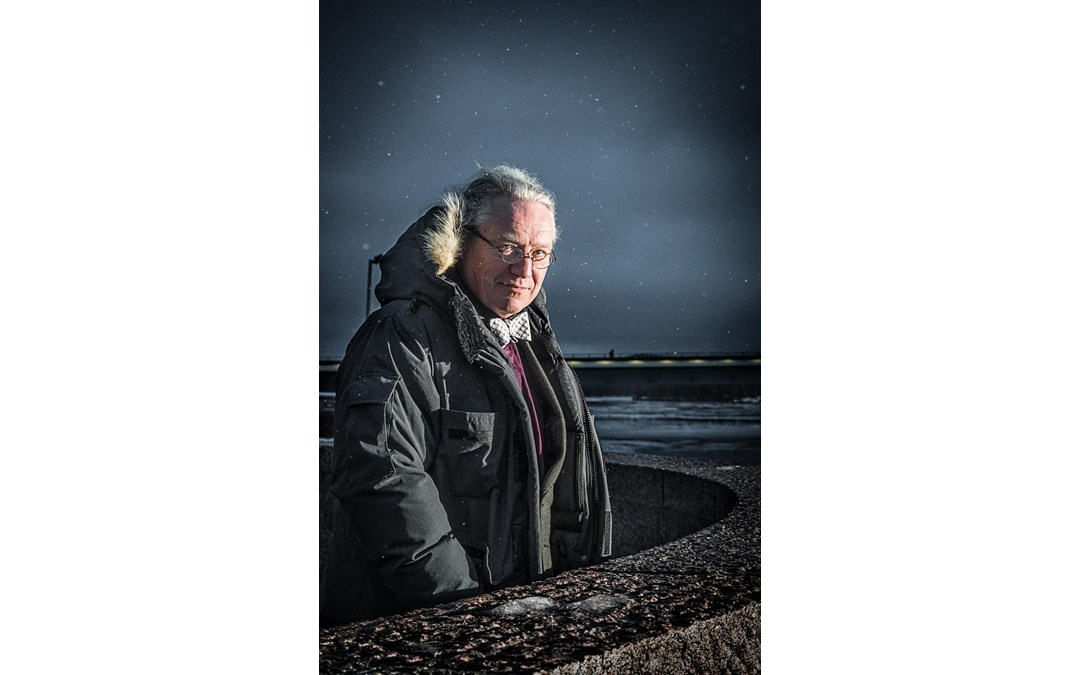
Lars Kullerud is the current president of UArctic network

The Board appoints the UArctic President for a six-year term. The President is responsible for ensuring that approved projects and activities are initiated and implemented in time. The President oversees the preparation of the budget and the development of an implementation plan, that states clear goals for the administration.

The President nominates Vice-Presidents, who are assigned to a particular task for which they assist the president. They are established in UArctic offices all around the Arctic and may be supported by a management team.

==== International Secretariat ====
The UArctic International Secretariat, based in Rovaniemi, Finland, is the key administrative body of the network. The Board nominates a Secretary General who is leading this administration closely with the President. The International Secretariat organises Assembly and Board meetings, maintains a membership registry, keeps accounts over finances and is in charge of information platforms (website maintenance, social media communication, Shared Voices Magazine…).

==== Regional Centres ====
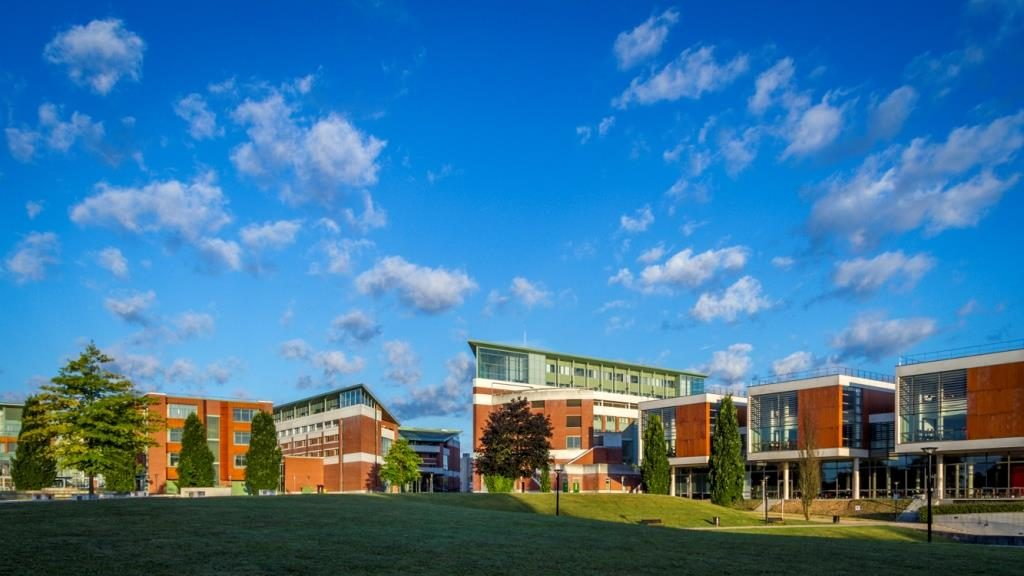
The University of Versailles Saint-Quentin-en-Yvelines hosts a Regional Centre of UArctic

One or more member institutions may support the network creating a UArctic Regional Centre. Regional Centres are meant to facilitate member engagement providing a structure for regional dialogue. This means that they will be in direct contact with national or regional administrations as well as other local stakeholders. Currently, UArctic has three Regional Centres (in Luleå, Versailles and Aberdeen).

=== Funding ===
The member organizations contribute resources to the University of the Arctic. Some of the countries with participating organizations, including Canada, Finland and Norway, provide funds for the university and its different programs, though the Federal Government of Canada decided in 2011 to cut its funding by 75 percent. A membership fee is also collected annually from member organizations that do not receive a waiver, ranging from 750€ to 4.000€; this fee is calculated based on the member institution's operating budget. UArctic is also financed via private donations.

== Programs and activities ==
=== Circumpolar Studies Program ===
Within UArctic is the UArctic Circumpolar Studies Consortium, which offers a core series of eight online undergraduate courses on various subjects concerning the Circumpolar North. These courses are open to all students studying at one of UArctic’s higher education member institutions, and completion of the core curriculum leads to the UArctic certificate in Circumpolar Studies. Outside of the core curriculum, certain institutions offer elective courses touching on various Arctic-related topics. The Consortium itself is made up of six UArctic higher education members, of which Trent University is the head institution. A related entity is the UArctic Læra Institute for Circumpolar Education, established in 2020 in order to facilitate the Circumpolar Studies program.

=== north2north ===
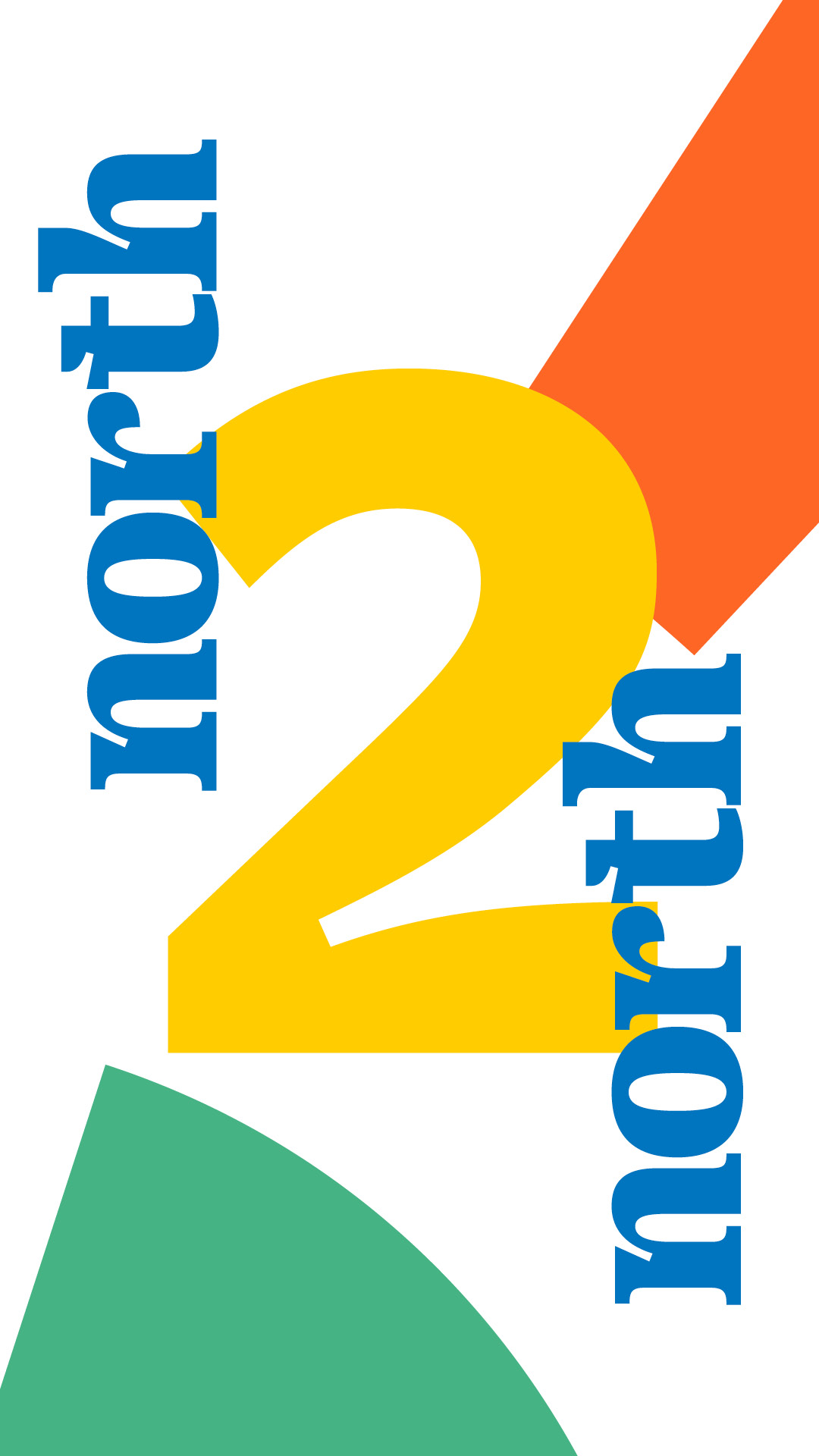
Official banner of the north2north mobility program

The north2north program (stylized in all lowercase letters) provides opportunities for students, staff, and researchers from UArctic member institutions that participate in the program to go on exchange at other north2north institutions. All institutions participating in north2north are necessarily members of UArctic.

north2north members fall into two categories depending on their location. So-called “full members” are those institutions located in the United States, Canada, Iceland, the Kingdom of Denmark, Norway, Sweden, Finland, Australia, the United Kingdom, and France; “associate members” are located outside of these regions. The participation of associate members in north2north is limited in a few regards, including that they may only send and receive individuals on exchange to and from full members and that they must fund outgoing exchanges.

There are 73 north2north institutions as of 2025, and it was reported that 149 individuals partook in an exchange in the 2023 reporting year. Exchanges through north2north can range between 1 week to a year in duration.

=== Field School ===
The UArctic Field School incorporates a selection of short, thematically focused courses that provide training for young researchers at member institutions in relevant fields. The Field School provides specialized onsite study of northern issues, organized by northern institutions. The UArctic Field School catalog is an online database of field excursion courses in which students from UArctic member institutions can participate.

=== Thematic Networks and Institutes ===
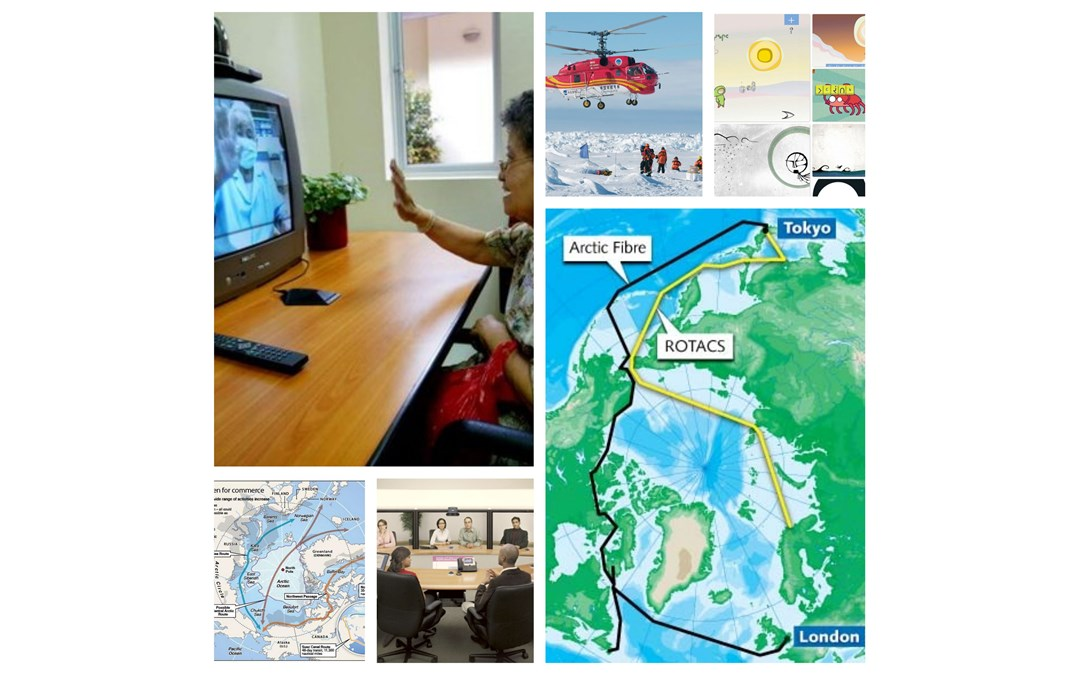
Thematic Network on Arctic Telecommunications and Networking

Thematic Networks and Institutes, often shortened to Thematic Networks, are independent units within UArctic oriented towards the generation of research and the creation of educational opportunities, also operating to facilitate collaboration between different UArctic members as well as relevant non-UArctic entities. The work and activities of each Thematic Network center around a different theme related to the Arctic region, including for instance Arctic Indigenous Film and Arctic Law. The first Thematic Networks were established in 2005, and as of 2025 there are 63; these can be divided into six categories by content:

- Business, Politics, and Law
- Culture and Social Sciences
- Engineering and Technology
- Health and Education
- Humanities and Arts
- Natural Sciences

Regarding the structure of Thematic Networks, each are led by a UArctic member institution and consist of individuals from at least three UArctic member institutions, which can include the lead institution. Collaboration with non-UArctic entities and individuals is permitted, though UArctic member participants must have majority say when it comes to making decisions for the Thematic Network.

=== Shared Voices Magazine ===
Shared Voices is the annual magazine of UArctic, compiled and edited by the International Secretariat office. It gets its name from the organization’s motto “with shared voices”. The content of each issue serves to provide a ‘year-in-review’ of the UArctic network, containing selected articles that are submitted by individuals or groups of individuals affiliated with UArctic activities in some capacity. The magazine also includes updated reports on subjects like member engagement, network membership, and funding.

The magazine has been made available both online and with physical copies, and the earliest issue is from 2006.

=== Grants and awards ===
There are four awards and grants that UArctic presents in order to financially support initiatives related to the Arctic. These are funded by donations made to the organization.

==== Frederik Paulsen Arctic Academic Action Award ====
The Frederik Paulsen Arctic Academic Action Award, jointly organized by UArctic and the Arctic Circle organization, aims to fund projects related to mitigating climate change. The 2025 award is 100,000 euros of unrestricted funds. The award is named after Frederik Paulsen Jr., a Swedish billionaire and Chair Emeritus of the Ferring Group. The first award was presented in 2021.

==== Entrepreneurship Fund ====
The Entrepreneurship Fund, created in 2023, awards financial support for incubator-stage products and services that are created to benefit the Arctic in some way. Typically, the award is a sum of $2,000-$5,000 USD. The fund was initiated by and is supported in part by Michael Carey.

==== UArctic x Lloyd’s register Foundation Research Fellowships ====
This collaborative initiative between UArctic and the Lloyd’s Register Foundation grants funding for research fellowships related to maritime safety in the Arctic region and which incorporate historical perspectives. A combined £200,000 GBP was awarded in 2025 to fund 5 fellowship positions.

==== Heal Fund ====
The Heal Fund, also known as the UArctic founders' endowment fund, was established to first financially support students and early-career researchers for cross-border collaboration, though this may shift at the President of the Board of UArctic's discretion. The fund was launched in September of 2021 and named after Bill Heal, credited with being the person who came up with the idea of UArctic.

== See also ==
- Arctic Circle
- Circumpolar Arctic
