= Lars Henrik Smedsrud =

Norwegian polar oceanographer

Lars H. Smedsrud
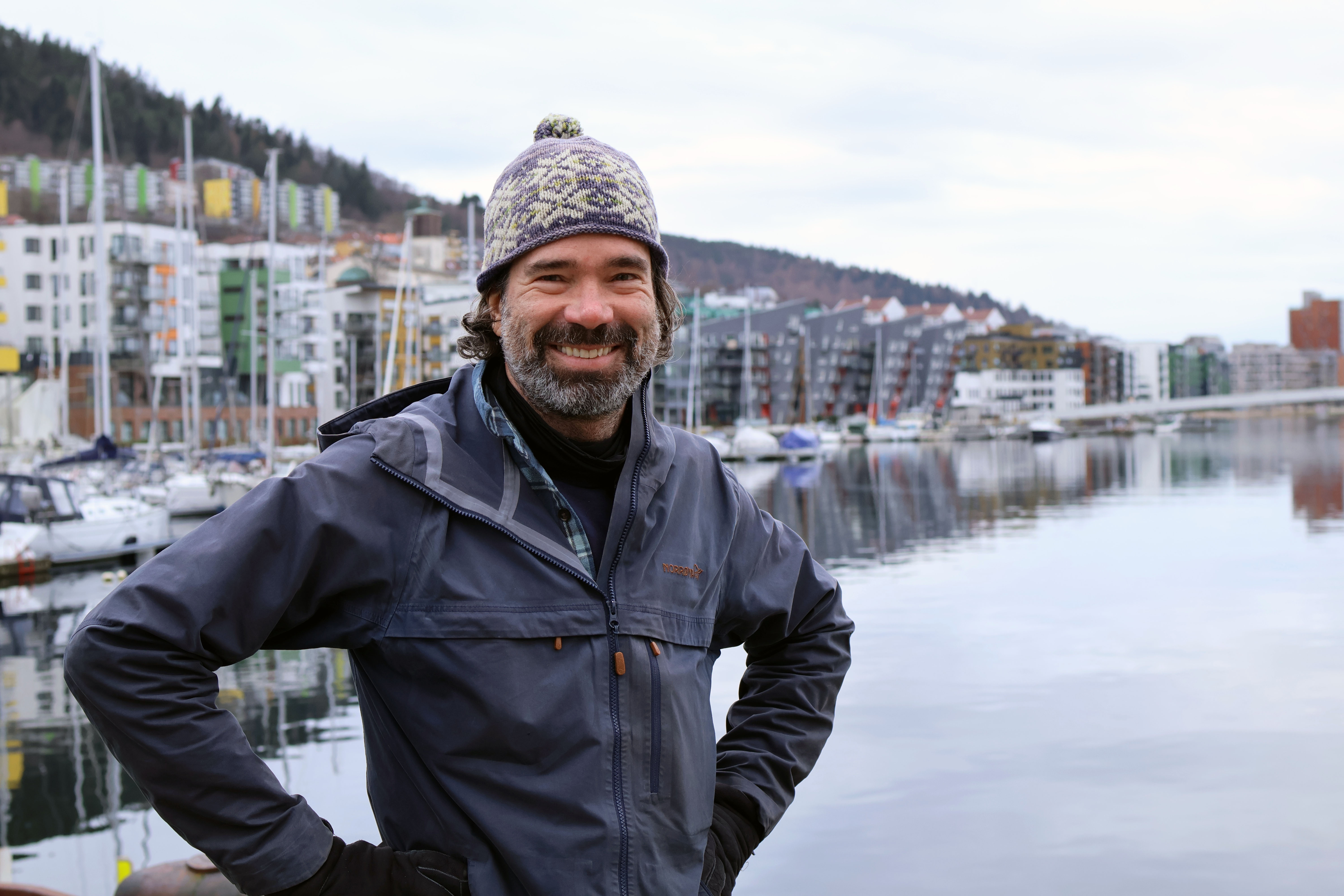
- Born: October 15, 1969 (age 56)
- Occupations: Polar oceanographer and an academic
- Title: Professor in Polar oceanography

Academic background
- Education: M.S., Physical Oceanography; Ph.D., Physical Oceanography
- Alma mater: University of Bergen

Lars Henrik Smedsrud is a Norwegian polar oceanographer and an academic. He is a professor at the Geophysical Institute, University of Bergen.

Smedsrud's research covers Arctic Ocean and Southern Ocean modeling, sea ice dynamics, freezing processes, sediment incorporation, and ice shelf melting, with publications in journals such as Reviews of Geophysics, Scientific Reports, and Journal of Climate. His research has gained attention, with features in an "Expert Interview" titled "Summer Ice in the Arctic is Disappearing," appearances on radio broadcasts such as "NRK Radio", and coverage in various media outlets, including forskning.no, Nature, NRK, and The Guardian.

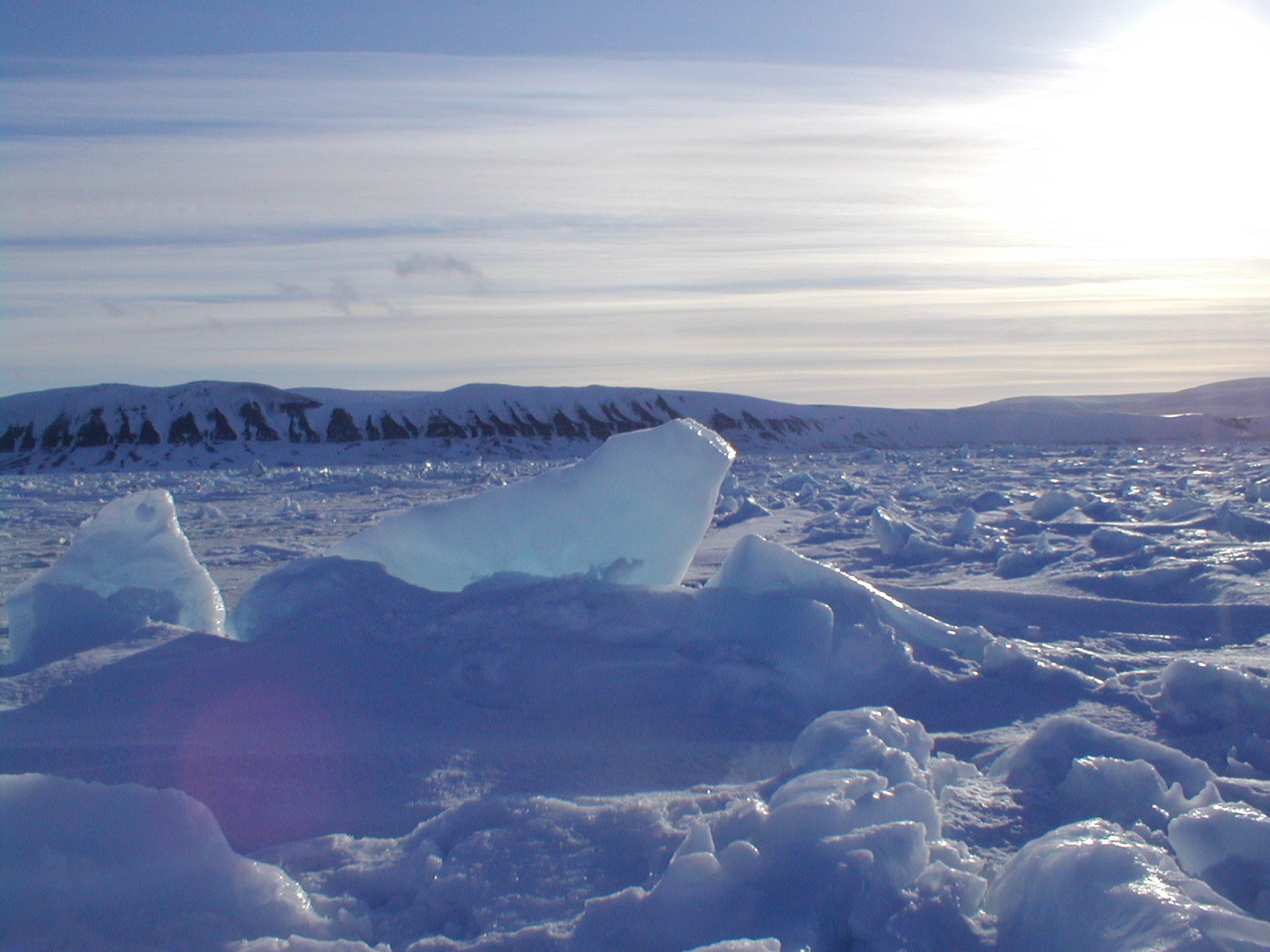
Sea ice in Storfjorden, Svalbard. Edgeøya in the background. This is first year's ice, but the strong currents in the Freeman Strait have packed the ice rather heavily. Photo: Lars H. Smedsrud

Smedsrud has field experience in Svalbard, the Barents Sea, the Arctic Ocean, and Antarctica, along with participation in laboratory experiments and work with various numerical models. He has been appointed as a Norwegian participant in the Fulbright Arctic Initiative from 2024 to 2026. Furthermore, he serves as a Polar Expert in an EU project that coordinates European Polar research, is a member of the Northern Ocean Panel, and is involved in developing a 'roadmap' focused on restoring Arctic sea ice, led by Ocean Visions.

== Education and early career ==
Smedsrud earned his Master of Science in Physical Oceanography in 1996. In March 2000, he completed his PhD on frazil ice formation and sediment entrainment in polar waters.

== Career ==
From 2004 to 2013, Smedsrud was a Researcher at the Bjerknes Centre for Climate Research and employed at the Uni Research company. Since 2013, he has served as a professor at the Geophysical Institute, University of Bergen, and since 2014, as a Professor II at the University Centre on Svalbard. He was the US-Norway Arctic Fulbright Chair from 2019 to 2020. In 2019 he was a contributing author in the IPCC Special Report on the Ocean and Cryosphere in a Changing Climate (SROCC).

Smedsrud has worked in Arctic research projects, including Climate Narratives, Nansen legacy, INTAROS, and FAMOS. He contributed to CliC, a project of the World Climate Research Program, between 2015 and 2021, and served on the Scientific Advisory Board of the Arctic Ice Project from 2020 to 2023. He is also a member of the Northern Ocean Panel, leads the Physical Oceanography research group at the Geophysical Institute, and a network for polar researchers at the University of Bergen.

== Research ==
Smedsrud's research has resulted in publications focused on Barents Sea dynamics, including Atlantic inflow, sea ice formation, and fjord dynamics in Svalbard. In 2010, he reported that about 70 TW of ocean heat transport primarily affected heat losses in the southern Barents Sea, with solar radiation influencing ice production. His work highlighted the "Atlantification" of the Barents Sea, where increased Atlantic heat has led to significant sea ice variability and reduced extent. He also emphasized the Barents Sea's role in Arctic climate variability, noting that recent warming trends and reduced ice are amplifying Arctic changes. Additionally, he and co-authors developed a framework predicting Barents Sea ice cover variability, explaining 50% of observed variance up to two years ahead.

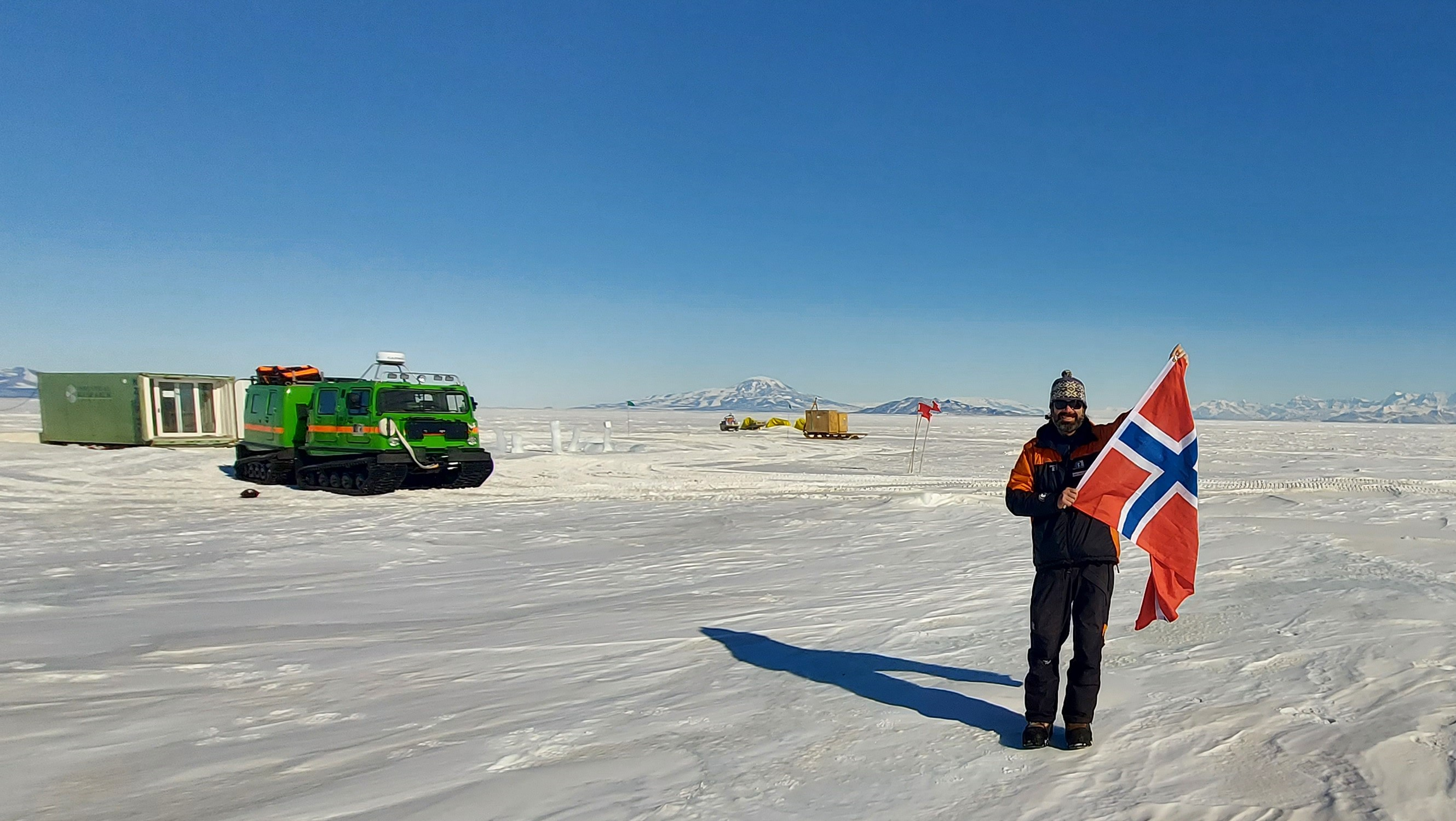
Lars H. Smedsrud on the sea ice just north of the McMurdo Ice shelf, Antarctica, in November 2021. (Photo: Brett Grant , NIWA)

Smedsrud's studies of the Barents Sea, Nordic Seas, and Antarctic Slope Front (ASF) examined oceanic processes shaping regional climate. He noted that oceanic heat advection and orbital forcing influenced early Holocene temperature variability in the Nordic Seas, peaking around 10 ka BP. His research on the ASF showed that eddy overturning controls the exchange of Warm Deep Water, impacting ice shelf melting. Moreover, in the Barents Sea, he found that reduced heat loss and warmer outflows, driven by southerly winds, have weakened its cooling efficiency, with significant future implications.

== Media coverage ==
Smedsrud's media features cover a range of topics related to climate change, focusing on the Arctic, the Gulf Stream, and polar regions. His work has also been highlighted in discussions about the potential collapse of the Gulf Stream, the impact of climate change on sea ice, and solutions to mitigate ice-sheet melting.

== Selected articles ==
- Årthun, M., Eldevik, T., Smedsrud, L. H., Skagseth, Ø., & Ingvaldsen, R. B. (2012). Quantifying the influence of Atlantic heat on Barents Sea ice variability and retreat. Journal of Climate, 25(13), 4736–4743.
- Smedsrud, L. H., Esau, I., Ingvaldsen, R. B., Eldevik, T., Haugan, P. M., Li, C., ... & Sorokina, S. A. (2013). The role of the Barents Sea in the Arctic climate system. Reviews of Geophysics, 51(3), 415–449.
- Zygmuntowska, M., Rampal, P., Ivanova, N., & Smedsrud, L. H. (2014). Uncertainties in Arctic sea ice thickness and volume: new estimates and implications for trends. The Cryosphere, 8(2), 705–720.
- • Onarheim, I. H., Eldevik, T., Årthun, M., Ingvaldsen, R. B., & Smedsrud, L. H. (2015). Skillful prediction of Barents Sea ice cover. Geophysical Research Letters, 42(13), 5364–5371.
- Smedsrud, L. H., Halvorsen, M. H., Stroeve, J. C., Zhang, R., & Kloster, K. (2017). Fram Strait sea ice export variability and September Arctic sea ice extent over the last 80 years. The Cryosphere, 11(1), 65–79.
- Onarheim, I. H., Eldevik, T., Smedsrud, L. H., & Stroeve, J. C. (2018). Seasonal and regional manifestation of Arctic sea ice loss. Journal of Climate, 31(12), 4917–4932.
