= Examen facultatum =

Aspect of Norwegian academic exams

Examen facultatum (Latin for faculty exam; abbreviated to Ex.fac.) is, together with Examen philosophicum, one of two academic exams in most undergraduate programmes at Norwegian universities. Examen facultatum is a result of theory of science being separated from Examen philosophicum as an independent type of course before 2000. Whereas Examen philosophicum trains students in philosophy and structured thinking, Examen facultatum aims at teaching students how to write academic texts, normally focussing on the scientific branch of each faculty and on the field of study of each undergraduate programme. It is common for universities to have a general course and a course specific part that intertwine with any chosen study as part of Examen philosophicum.

Examen facultatum as a compulsory course is legally based in royal regulations for each university, for example Regulations of 20 December 2005 No. 1798 on Studies and Exams at the University of Oslo in the case of the University of Oslo. Both Examen facultatum and Examen philosophicum are compulsory parts of most bachelor's degrees in Norway: mainly professional studies at university colleges and natural science studies at universities are exempt from either one or both.

== See also ==
- Examen artium
- Examen philosophicum
