= Examen philosophicum =

Aspect of Norwegian academic exams

Examen philosophicum (Latin for philosophic exam; abbreviated to Ex.phil.) is, together with Examen facultatum, one of two academic exams in most undergraduate programmes at Norwegian universities. Whereas Examen facultatum aims at teaching students how to write academic texts, Examen philosophicum trains students in philosophy and structured thinking. Introduced at the University of Copenhagen in Denmark–Norway in 1675, Examen philosophicum was discontinued in Denmark in 1971 and exists in a reduced version in Norway.

== Denmark ==
Passing it is a requirement for higher education in Denmark. During World War II, it was expected to educate students into supporting democracy instead of "authoritarianism". It being a requirement has been criticized due to alleged educational underfunding.

== Norway ==
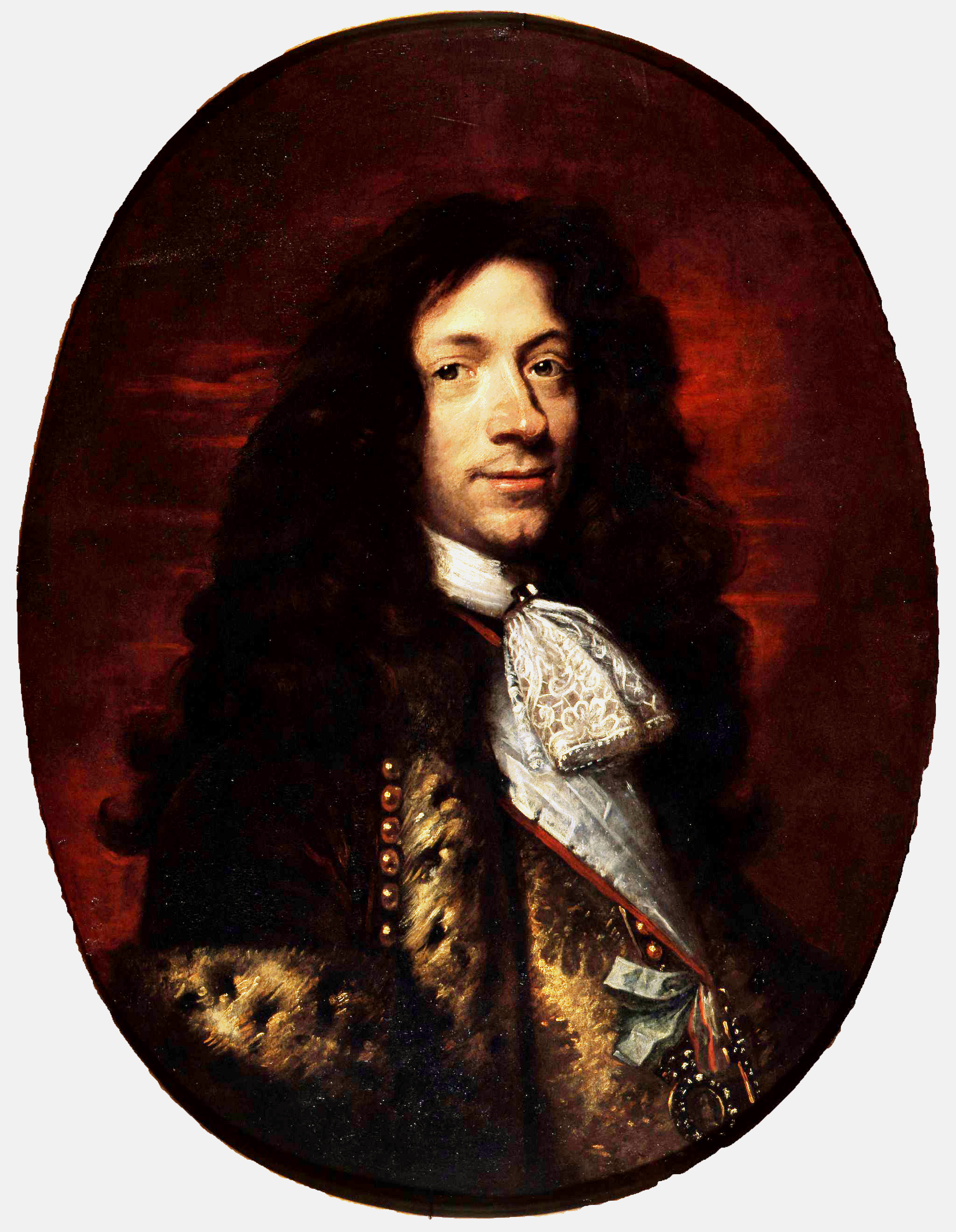
The Count of Griffenfeld is considered the inventor of Ex.phil.

Examen philosophicum as a compulsory course is legally based in royal regulations for each university, for example Regulations of 20 December 2005 No. 1798 on Studies and Exams at the University of Oslo. Both Examen philosophicum and Examen facultatum are compulsory parts of most bachelor's degrees in Norway: mainly professional studies at university colleges and a few natural science studies at universities are exempt from either one or both.

The content of Examen philosophicum varies between universities (and areas), normally being adapted to the scientific branch of each faculty and on the field of study of each undergraduate programme. For example, students of foreign languages will normally study a variety which is adapted to ditto. In general, Examen philosophicum includes philosophy, ethics, and rhetoric.

Introduced in 1675 at the University of Copenhagen, Examen philosophicum was continued by the University of Oslo in 1812, two years before the Dano-Norwegian union was dissolved. It was called andreeksamen (second exam) between 1812 and 1903, contrasting Examen artium as førsteeksamen (first exam). It was then called forberedende prøve i filosofi (preparatory test in philosophy) between 1903 and 1967, before ultimately retaining its original name in 1967.

Examen philosophicum originally had a duration of two or three semesters, including exams in philosophy, history, mathematics, astronomy, natural sciences, Latin language, Greek language, and—for theology students—Hebraic language. Latin, Greek, and history were dropped in 1845, whilst natural sciences were split into physics and chemistry. Philosophy became the sole field of study in 1875.

Under the former cand.mag. system, an Examen philosophicum course was worth 5.0 vekttall, corresponding to a half semester, and along with Examen facultatum, it made up an introductory semester at universities. Later reduced in scope, both Examen philosophicum and Examen facultatum are normally worth 10.0 ECTS each, corresponding to two thirds of a semester.

== See also ==
- Examen artium
- Examen facultatum

== Literature ==
- Rørvik, Thor Inge (1999) Historien om examen philosophicum 1675-1983 [Oslo]: Forum for universitetshistorie.
