= Margareth Hagen =

Rector of the University of Bergen (2021-) and professor of Italian literature

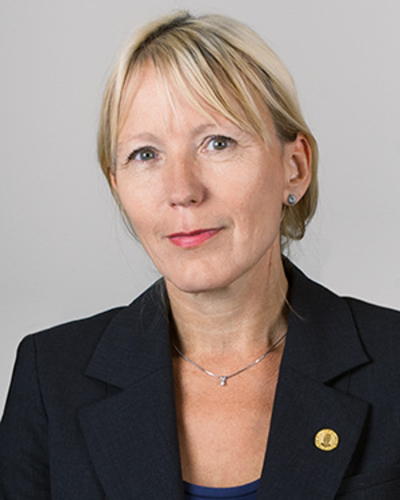
- Hagen in 2020

Rector of the University of Bergen
- Incumbent
- Assumed office January 4, 2021
- Preceded by: Dag Rune Olsen

Personal details
- Born: August 3, 1965 (age 61) Molde Municipality, Norway
- Education: University of Bergen
- Occupation: Rector, Professor of Italian literature

Academic background
- Thesis: La tragedia di Giambattista Giraldi. Retorica e tematica di un dramma moderno (2000)

Academic work
- Discipline: Italian literature

Margareth Hagen (born 1965) is the elected rector of the University of Bergen, and a professor of Italian literature. She was the University's elected deputy rector for research from 2017 to 2021, and Dean of the Humanities Faculty until 2017. She won her first election running as rektor in 2021, with computer scientist Pinar Heggernes as prorector, and won reelection in 2025, with Sigrunn Eliassen, a professor of theoretical ecology, as prorector.

== Academic career ==
Hagen came to the University of Bergen as a student in the 1980s, first studying organisation and administration, and then Italian literature. She was interested in history, and in particular the 1500s, which she characterised as an exciting time of change in Italy, with the Counter-Reformation, the Inquisition and Machiavelli.

The anthology Literature and Chemistry: Elective Affinities, co-edited with Margery Skagen, marked a transition from literary studies to a broader engagement with the relationship between the humanities and the natural sciences. A reviewer describes the book as "an absorbing work both for those interested in chemistry as well as those fascinated with literature – and an absolute treasure for fans of both subjects", although he does remark that the view of chemistry in literature appears to be almost only negative: "the mad scientist in his laboratory seems to be the general view of the chemist in popular culture". Another reviewer praises the anthology's "mix of literary critics, chemists, and historians of science and medicine".

== University leadership ==
As the elected deputy rector, Hagen took over as rector in January 2021 when Dag Rune Olsen left before his term as rector was complete to take a position at the University of Tromsø.

Hagen became rector during the pandemic, and in an interview right after the election told reporters that bringing students back to campus and ensuring good social learning environments was extremely important.

She was reelected for four new years in 2025.
