= Sars International Centre for Marine Molecular Biology =

The Michael Sars Centre is a research institute at the University of Bergen located in Bergen, Norway. It consists of an international community of scientists that use advanced technologies to study the unique molecular and cellular biology of marine organisms.

== History ==
The Michael Sars Centre was established in April 1997 under its former name Sars International Centre for Marine Molecular Biology. It is located at the Bergen High Technology Centre and is part of the Faculty of Mathematics and Natural Sciences at the University of Bergen since 2023. It is named after the Norwegian marine biologist Michael Sars (1805–1869), father of Georg Ossian Sars (1837–1927).

== Organisation ==
Research at the Centre is undertaken by six to eight groups, each working for a period of six to ten years. The Sars Centre is an EMBL partner European Molecular Biology Laboratory with which it exchanges scientific information about areas of common interest. As one of the first EMBL partners, the Michael Sars Centre is rooted in the Bergen academic community and serves as a national strategical asset for Norwegian marine life sciences.

== Facilities ==
The Centre is well equipped for microscopy and imaging and owns several confocal microscopes. It also makes use of facilities provided by the University of Bergen, including its marine station at Espegrend. Current model species include the sea anemone Nematostella vectensis, the ctenophore Mnemiopsis leidyi, the tunicates Oikopleura dioica and Ciona intestinalis and the annelid worms Malacoceros fuliginosus and Dimorphilus gyrociliatus.

== Research ==
Research at the Centre involves using marine organisms to study their embryonic development, genomes, cell biology, neurobiology and beheviour, often in an evolutionary context, using advanced molecular and imaging techniques. Currently studied species include the tunicates Oikopleura dioica and Ciona intestinalis, the annelid worms Malacoceros fuliginosus and Dimorphilus gyrociliatus, the sea anemone Nematostella vectensis, the ctenophore Mnemiopsis leidyi and the choanoflagellate Salpingoeca rosetta. In the past, research at the Centre also included work on zebrafish, salmon, sponges, acoel flatworms and nemertodermatids.
