= Eystein Jansen =

Norwegian marine geologist and paleoceanographer

Eystein Jansen (born 28 February 1953) is a Norwegian professor in marine geology and paleoceanography at the University of Bergen, and researcher and former Director of the Bjerknes Centre for Climate Research (BCCR). He is also the vice-president of the European Research Council (ERC), as the scientific leader of the EU's commitment to basic research in the fields of physical sciences and engineering.

== Biography ==
Jansen graduated from the University of Bergen with a MSc-degree in paleoceanography in 1981, and a PhD degree in 1984 with a thesis entitled Late Weichselian paleoceanography in the Nordic Seas.

After his PhD Jansen was given a researcher position and charged with building up the National Laboratory for light stable isotope geochemistry at the University of Bergen, which was established in 1983. The establishment of the laboratory brought Jansen into contact with many of the leading figures internationally in the emerging field of paleoclimatology, and in particular his close contact with University of Cambridge scientist Nicholas Shackleton became formative for his career. In 1985 Jansen was hired as tenured associate professor at the University of Bergen, and in 1993 he was promoted to full professor.

Jansen has published about 200 scientific papers on the relationship between ocean circulation and climate change with emphasis on the build-up and demise of ice sheets. Most of his studies are from the Arctic and sub-Arctic regions, but his work also encompasses oceans in the Southern Hemisphere and the tropics. His work combines geochemical and sedimentological methods on ocean sediments acquired through active participation the Ocean Drilling Program, the Images program and many cruises on Norwegian vessels. In 2014 Jansen received an ERC Synergy Grant (ice2ice) to work with three other principal investigators on abrupt climate change.

Jansen initiated and headed the Bjerknes Centre for Climate Research as Director from its founding in 2000 to 2013. The Centre was awarded status as Norwegian Centre of Excellence by the Norwegian Research Council in 2002.

He is a member of the Scientific Council of the European Research Council, he is the Academic Director of the Academia Europaea Bergen Knowledge Hub, and heads the Geoscience group of the Norwegian Academy of Science and Letters. Jansen is also co-director of the SapienCE Centre which is a Norwegian Centre of Excellence awarded by the Norwegian Research Council in 2017, and hosted by the University of Bergen, integrating archaeology, climate science and cognitive and neurosciences in studies of the emergence of modern behaviour in Homo sapiens in Southern Africa 120,000–50,000 years ago.

Jansen was a co-ordinating lead author for the paleoclimate chapter of the IPCC Fourth Assessment Report and was one of the lead authors of the IPCC Fifth Assessment Report.

== Awards and memberships in learned societies ==
- Academia Europaea, 2012
- Norwegian Academy of Science and Letters, 1998
- Norwegian Academy of Technological Sciences, 2005
- Norwegian Scientific Academy for Polar Research, 2007
- Meltzer prize for excellence in research, 2019
- Brøgger prize for life-long achievements in geological sciences, 2019
