= Osthus =

Osthus or Østhus is a surname. Notable people with the surname include:

- Bernt Østhus (born 1970), Norwegian lawyer and investor
- Liv Osthus (born 1975), American writer, activist, musician, and stripper
- Deryk Osthus (fl. 2003), British-based professor and mathematician
