= Harstad University College =

Educational institution in Norway

- Høgskolen i Harstad (HiH)
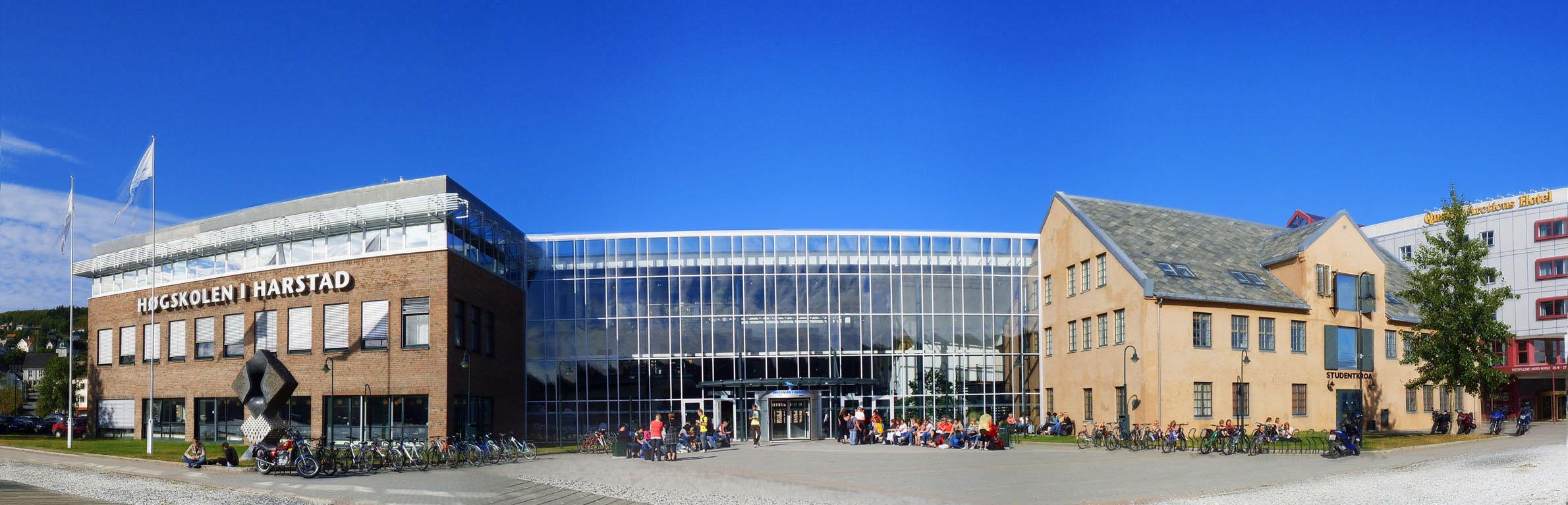
- Harstad University College
- Type: University college
- Established: 1 August 1994
- Affiliations: UArctic
- Rector: Bodil Olsvik
- Academic staff: 120
- Students: 1,300
- Location: Harstad, Norway; 68°48′13″N 16°32′48″E
- Website: www.hih.no

Harstad University College (Norwegian: Høgskolen i Harstad or HiH) was a høgskole, a Norwegian state institution of higher education, in the city of Harstad which is located in Harstad Municipality in Troms county, Norway.

It was originally established on 28 October 1983 but was enlarged on 1 August 1994 as a result of the merging of three regional høgskoler. Harstad University College had about 1300 students and 120 employees in 2012. Harstad University College was at that time organised in two departments, the Business Administration and Social Sciences Department, and the Health and Social Care Department.

Department of Business Administration and Social Sciences consisted of two sections:

- Leadership, Management, and Organization
- Services

Department of Health and Social Care consisted of four sections:

- Social Education
- Nursing
- Child Welfare Education
- Continuing Education

== End of separate existence ==
However, on 1 January 2016 the college was merged with the University of Tromsø and the location became one of that university's several regional campuses.
