= Sigmund Grønmo =

Norwegian sociologist

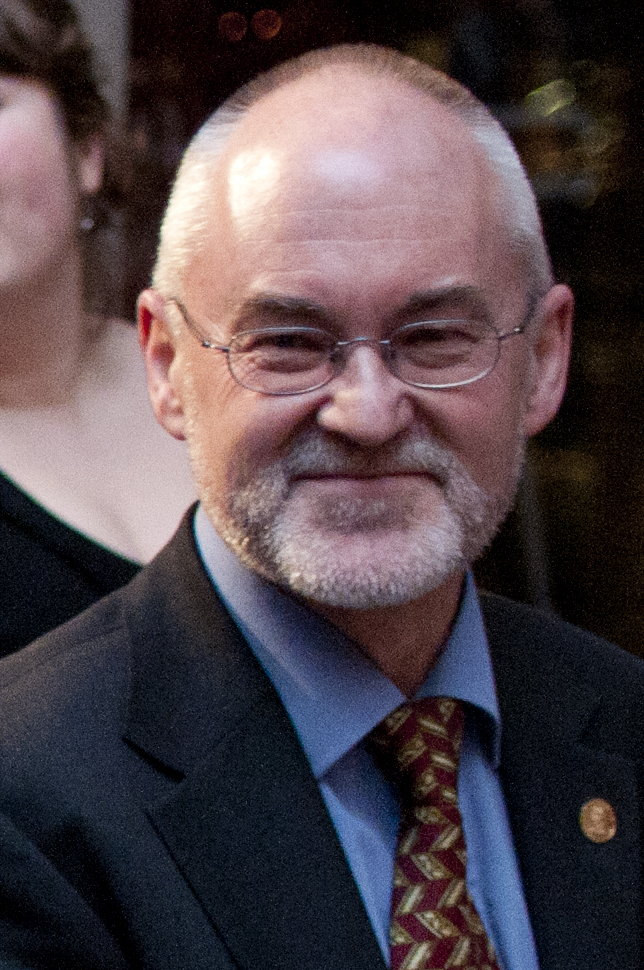
Sigmund Grønmo in 2012

Sigmund Harald Grønmo (born 28 March 1947) is a Norwegian sociologist.

In his younger days he was the chairman of the Socialist Youth Association (SUF) from 1968 to 1969. In 1971 he graduated in sociology from the University of Oslo.

He later became a professor at the University of Oslo and at the University of Bergen. In Bergen he has been both dean and prorector, and in 2005 he was elected as rector. He also tried to become rector in 1998, but lost to Kirsti Koch Christensen with 898 to 1,091 votes.

Notable books include Militære meninger (1975), Sosiale nettverk og økonomisk makt (2003) and Samfunnsvitenskapelige metoder (2004). He has edited the journal Sosiologisk årbok. He is a member of the Norwegian Academy of Science and Letters. He has also been a board member of NIFU-STEP.

Party political offices
Preceded by Sigurd Allern	Chairman of the Socialist Youth Association (SUF); 1968–1969	Succeeded by Pål Steigan
Academic offices
Preceded by Kirsti Koch Christensen	Rector of the University of Bergen; 2005–2013	Succeeded by Dag Rune Olsen
