= Student loans in Norway =

Student loans in Norway are issued by Norwegian State Educational Loan Fund (Norwegian: Statens lånekasse for utdanning, commonly referred to as Lånekassen). Lånekassen provides both loans and grants. Loans are issued to students following studies at Norwegian universities and colleges. Qualified applicants studying abroad outside the Nordic region can also receive loan and grant support from Lånekassen. The status of a grant is conditional on passing all exams every semester. Portions of student loans can be converted into additional grant funding if the student achieves a high grade point average for the semester.

Loan and grant funding levels by Lånekassen are calculated using multiple variables including (but not limited to) tuition costs, income status, and whether or not the applicant is living with parents or other hosts rent-free.

== Interest Rates ==
No interest is paid on Norwegian student loans until graduation or an interruption of the education. As of 2016, borrowers can sign an agreement for a fixed interest rate. Absent this, the interest rate is variable, calculated by the Ministry of Finance as the government's expected borrowing costs in the same interest period plus a 1.25% premium added to the effective annual interest rate.

== Repayment Structure ==
Repayments on Norwegian student loans - either in the form of interest or principal - do not begin until graduation or interruption of studies. Repayment is structured in the form of amortization, with interest and principal combined into a fixed monthly payment (like an annuity).

Fixed interest rate loans have repayment periods of 3, 5, or 10 years from the time that the loan becomes interest-bearing. The longest repayment term is 20 years, but can be deferred up to 30 years. After graduation, students are given a default grace period of 5 months before they have to begin making payments in the sixth month. Borrowers can request additional deferment periods for a maximum deferment of 3 years. The accrued interest from the deferment period will be capitalized into the loan, meaning that the standard monthly payment will increase for every additional deferment period.

There are certain applicable exemptions for payment of interest, including (but not limited to) military service such as a student attending a military academy, civil service, care work, and welfare and poverty-based exemptions.

== Key Figures ==
- Lånekassen's lending portfolio is ca. NOK (Norwegian Kroner) 164 billion.
- As of December 31st, 2016, Lånekassen had 1,058,700 customers of which 653,800 are repaying their loans.
- 422,500 upper education students and high school pupils applied for financial support for the academic year 2015 - 2016.
- The average loan after graduation (higher education) in Norway was ca. NOK 280,000 in 2016.
- In the academic year 2015 - 2016, NOK 3.7 billion in grants and NOK 22.7 billion in loans were allocated to students and pupils. Approximately NOK 6 billion of the loan funds are expected to be converted to grants.
