= Kirsti Koch Christensen =

Norwegian linguist (born 1940)

Kirsti Koch Christensen (born December 1, 1940) is a Norwegian linguist that served as chancellor of the University of Bergen from 1999 to 2005.

Kirsti Koch Christensen was born in Oslo. She received a master's degree in general linguistics from the University of Oslo in 1978. She has also studied at the University of Hawaii, Massachusetts Institute of Technology, and Stanford University, and in Kobe, Japan. In 1991 Koch Christensen became a linguistics professor at the University of Bergen with special responsibility for Japanese. She had previously been an associate professor of linguistics at the University of Bergen (1988–1990) and at the University of Oslo (1990–1991).

Koch Christensen has held a variety of executive and board positions, both in academia and in society and business. From 2002 to 2005, Koch Christensen was the head of the Norwegian Association of Higher Education Institutions (Norwegian: Universitets- og høgskolerådet, UHR). She has also served as chair of the Center for Advanced Study in Theoretical Linguistics (CASTL) since 2003, as chair and director of the Nordic Institute of Asian Studies (Norwegian: Nordisk institutt for Asiastudier), and as a member of the executive board of the Research Council of Norway. Koch Christensen has also held directorships in the National Institute of Nutrition and Seafood Research (Norwegian: Nasjonalt institutt for ernærings- og sjømatforskning, NIFES), the Bergen International Festival, the publisher Gyldendal, and Statoil.

On April 3, 2003, Koch Christensen was made a Knight 1st Class of the Royal Norwegian Order of St. Olav. In 2006, Koch Christensen was awarded the Japanese Order of the Rising Sun 3rd Class, Gold Rays with Neck Ribbon, for her work in Japanese culture, the development of Japanese language teaching in Norway, and her contribution to promoting friendly relations between Norway and Japan.

Academic offices
Preceded by Jan Fridthjof Bernt	Rector of the University of Bergen; 1999–2005	Succeeded by Sigmund Grønmo
