= University college (Scandinavia) =

Scandinavian institution for tertiary education

In Denmark, Norway, and Sweden, a university college (Swedish: högskola; Norwegian: høyskole, høgskole or høgskule; Danish: professionshøjskole; literally meaning "high school" and "professional high school") is an independent institution that provides tertiary education (bachelor's and master's degrees) and quaternary education (PhD). Most of these institutions traditionally had an emphasis on less academic and more vocational programmes such as teacher or nursing education as well as shorter technical education; historically, these institutions were somewhat similar to a Fachhochschule in Germany and to a Polytechnic in the United Kingdom. The term is also used for some specialized universities.

Today, the distinction between university colleges and universities is of less importance in Sweden and Norway. In Denmark, university colleges grant non-academic degrees, but these may in some cases give access to further education at master level at a university.

== Sweden ==
The Swedish government is the only entity that can attribute university status. However, the exact situation of Swedish university colleges varies in that respect, i.e. many them may are engaged in research and grant doctoral degrees in a number of fields. The main difference between an institution with full university status and a university college lies in the larger variety of academic subjects offered at a university, and the traditional right of the university to award doctoral degrees in any field.

== Norway ==
In Norway three separate categories of university colleges exist:

- University-level colleges (vitenskapelig høgskole/høyskole), which hold the same rights as the universities and are sometimes known as specialized universities in English
- Institutionally accredited university colleges (høgskole/høyskole)
- Educational institutions with accredited programs, which have the right to call themselves university colleges (høgskole/høyskole)

The difference between a university and a university college is that a university has received the status of university from the Norwegian government. Only the government has the authority to grant university status. In the past years, any institution that offered at least four PhD programmes has been allowed to apply for university status, and in recent years several university colleges have received university status, becoming so-called new universities. In 2014 the government announced that no institutions would become new universities in the near future. In 2015 the government announced new and more strict criteria.

The practical distinction between universities and university colleges has been gradually reduced through legislative reforms in 1995 and 2005, and the two types of institutions are now governed by the same law, have the same basic structure and in principle the same obligation to provide research-based education.

== Denmark ==
In Denmark, university colleges (professionshøjskoler) are similar to universities of applied sciences. Danish university colleges offer profession-specific tertiary education, also known as medium higher education (MVU) and diploma courses, but do not offer university education at the postgraduate level.

The duration of bachelor's programmes is seven semesters and corresponds to 210 ECTS. Specific to university college programmes is that curricula always include internships and placements. This focus on professional practice, as opposed to academics, is what separates a bachelor's degree at university colleges from a bachelor's from a university.

The difference between a university and university college degree is narrowing. Since 2012, university colleges have been awarded the right and governmental funding to carry out applied research.

In addition, several bachelor's degrees are articulated with master's degrees at research universities in Denmark and abroad.

Denmark has 7 university colleges, which all have a school of health and a school of education, pedagogy, and social studies. Some also have a school of technology, a school of business, and a school of design.

In addition to higher educational programmes, university colleges are important suppliers of lifelong education for public and private industries.

== Translation ==
University college is the most widely used official English translation in Sweden, Norway and Denmark, although some such institutions use the term university in English instead (for instance Södertörn University). The terminology may be confusing to foreigners as university colleges are not constituent colleges of another university as some may understand the word literally, but rather institutions in their own right and standing.

The Swedish term högskola and the Norwegian term høyskole, høgskole or høgskule would mean "high school" in a word-by-word translation. This translation is also misleading, as these institutions provide tertiary level education, not secondary education as American high schools do.

Some of these university colleges do aspire a lift to full university status by the Swedish or Norwegian government, and have therefore changed their translated English name to "university", although they are not a university by Swedish and Norwegian law. A full university in Sweden requires extensive own research, a breadth of academic disciplines and a licence to award doctor's degrees in all fields it teaches. In Norway, university status may be conferred to an institution offering at least four PhD programmes.

The term högskola, høyskole, høgskole or høgskule is also used by a number of specialised universities, especially the technical universities. Some subunits of the universities in Sweden also use the term "högskola" to mark their status within the larger university or for traditional reasons. For instance, several engineering faculties call themselves "teknisk högskola" in Swedish, like Lunds Tekniska Högskola and Linköpings Tekniska Högskola, which both were originally established independently of their respective universities.

== See also ==
- Education in Sweden
- List of universities in Sweden
- Higher education in Norway
- University of applied sciences (Finland)
- Hochschule
- Hogeschool (disambiguation)
- University college
