= Tom Mollnes =

Norwegian immunologist

Tom E. Mollnes
- Born: June 17, 1956 (age 70)
- Occupations: Immunologist and academic
- Spouse: Solveig Mollnes

Academic background
- Education: MD; PhD
- Alma mater: University of Bergen; University of Oslo

Academic work
- Institutions: Nordland Hospital Trust; University of Oslo

Tom E. Mollnes is a Norwegian immunologist and academic. He is a Senior Researcher at the Nordland Hospital Trust and a Professor at the University of Oslo.

Mollnes' research interests include investigating the role of the complement system in human disease, developing monoclonal antibodies, assays, and therapies targeting complement activation and CD14, with work in terminal complement complex (TCC) detection and novel blood models. His scholarly contributions include research articles published in journals, including PNAS, Blood, Circulation, European Heart Journal, Trends in Immunology, and The Journal of Immunology. He received an Honorary Doctorate from the University of Copenhagen, held the role of President in the European Complement Network (ECN), and was awarded with ECN Gold Medal. Among other honors, he received Copenhagen Rigshospitalet International KFG-prize, Medinnova Idea Prize, and Norwegian Region North Research Prize.

== Education and early career ==
In 1981, Mollnes completed his MD from the University of Bergen and, in 1983, was appointed as an Authorized Physician in Norway. From 1983 to 1988, he worked as a Resident at Oslo University Hospital and was subsequently appointed as a Resident at Gravdal Hospital, where he served until 1990. During this period, he earned his PhD from the University of Oslo in 1985.

== Career ==
From 1990 to 2014, Mollnes served as Head of the Immunology and Transfusion Medicine Department at Nordland Hospital. Concurrently, he held a Professorship at the University of Tromsø between 1993 and 2021. In 2013, he was appointed Professor at the Norwegian University of Science and Technology, a role he held until 2022. Since 2001, he has been a professor in the Faculty of Medicine at the University of Oslo, and since 2014, a Senior Researcher at the Nordland Hospital Trust.

== Research ==
Mollnes' research work has focused on the role of complement in human disease. He started by developing novel monoclonal antibodies detecting neoepitopes exposed in activation products, not present in the native components, and applied them in specific complement activation assays. In his PhD thesis in 1985, he employed monoclonal antibodies recognizing a neoepitope in activated C9 to successfully detect the human terminal complement complex (TCC) in both tissues (as C5b-9 membrane attack complex) and in plasma (as soluble TCC, sC5b-9), offering an effective method for identifying and quantifying TCC. The enzyme-linked immunosorbent assay (ELISA) he developed, utilizing one of these monoclonal antibodies (aE11) against a neoepitope of TCC, enabled precise quantification of TCC in human plasma and confirmed its elevated levels in patients with increased complement activation. He further emphasized that the TCC assay is applicable in clinical medicine in a number of different diseases, including prediction of severe disease in COVID-19 infection. The TCC/sC5b-9 assay is established as a standard assay in the clinic for detection of complement activation in patients suffering inflammatory conditions.

Mollnes examined how complement contributes to inflammation, tissue damage, and disease, exploring its interactions with the immune system and implications for inflammatory disorders. In 2002, he demonstrated complement's significant role in inflammation and tissue damage, highlighting the C5a receptor's involvement in E. coli-induced oxidative burst and phagocytosis. He made a human whole blood model, using the lepuridin-specific inhibition of thrombin, to study the mutual interaction of complement with the remaining inflammatory network in a holistic system. In this model, he documented using complement inhibitors, that complement was important for a substantial part of the downstream innate immune responses. Additionally, by searching for other recognition systems, he found that the Toll-like receptors, along with the co-receptor CD14, were responsible for the majority of the remaining downstream inflammatory reaction. Based on these results, a hypothesis of the "dual-blockade" of complement and CD14 was postulated and reviewed. In mice, pig, and baboon models of sepsis this dual-blockade improved morbidity and reduced mortality.

In 2004, Mollnes established, by a quantitative method, that alternative pathway amplification significantly influences classical pathway-induced C5 activation, and later, he documented the same for the lectin pathway, emphasizing the crucial role of the alternative pathway in complement-mediated inflammation and tissue damage. In the related review, he discussed novel aspects of the alternative complement pathway, emphasizing its critical role in inflammation and disease progression.

== Awards and honors ==
- 2006 – Medinnova Idea Prize, Oslo University Hospital and the University of Oslo
- 2017 – Copenhagen Rigshospitalet International KFG Prize
- 2022 – European Complement Network Gold Medal, European Complement Network
- 2022 – Honorary Doctorate, University of Copenhagen

== Selected articles ==
- Mollnes, T. E., Lea, T., Harboe, M., & Tschopp, J. (1985). Monoclonal antibodies recognizing a neoantigen of poly (C9) detect the human terminal complement complex in tissue and plasma. Scandinavian journal of immunology, 22(2), 183–195.
- Mollnes, T. E., Brekke, O. L., Fung, M., Fure, H., Christiansen, D., Bergseth, G., ... & Lambris, J. D. (2002). Essential role of the C5a receptor in E coli–induced oxidative burst and phagocytosis revealed by a novel lepirudin-based human whole blood model of inflammation. Blood, The Journal of the American Society of Hematology, 100(5), 1869–1877.
- Barratt-Due, A., Pischke, S. E., Nilsson, P. H., Espevik, T., & Mollnes, T. E. (2017). Dual inhibition of complement and Toll-like receptors as a novel approach to treat inflammatory diseases—C3 or C5 emerge together with CD14 as promising targets. Journal of Leukocyte Biology, 101(1), 193–204.
- Holter, J. C., Pischke, S. E., de Boer, E., Lind, A., Jenum, S., Holten, A. R., ... & Mollnes, T. E. (2020). Systemic complement activation is associated with respiratory failure in COVID-19 hospitalized patients. Proceedings of the National Academy of Sciences, 117(40), 25018–25025.
- Garred, P., Tenner, A. J., & Mollnes, T. E. (2021). Therapeutic targeting of the complement system: from rare diseases to pandemics. Pharmacological reviews, 73(2), 792–827.
