= Dag Rune Olsen =

Norwegian scientist

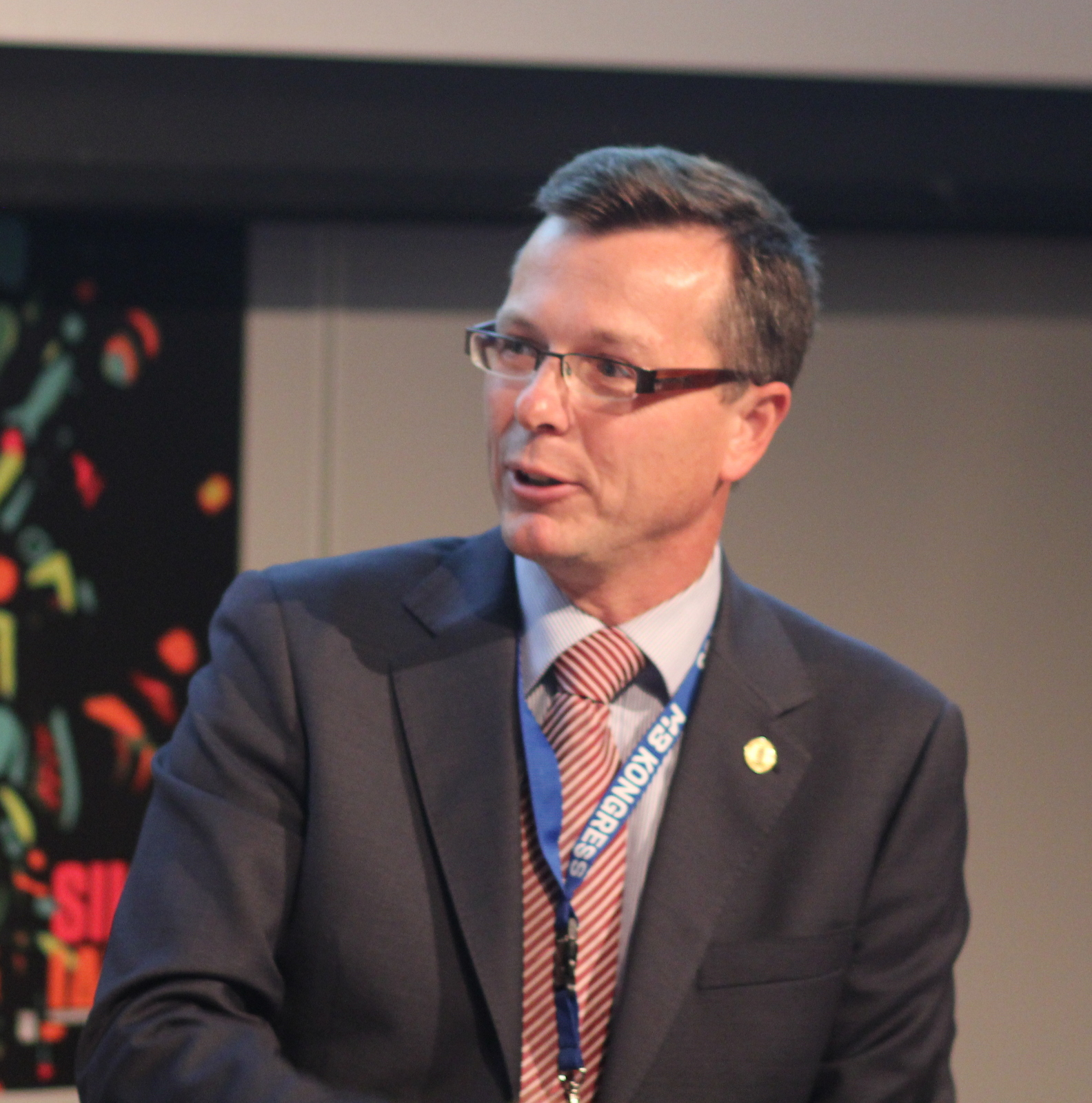
- Olsen in 2013

Rector of the University of Tromsø
- Incumbent
- Assumed office August 1, 2021
- Preceded by: Anne Husebekk

Rector of the University of Bergen
- In office August 1, 2013 – January 20, 2021
- Preceded by: Sigmund Grønmo

Personal details
- Born: February 12, 1962 (age 64) Røros Municipality, Norway
- Education: University of Oslo
- Occupation: Rector, scientist

Dag Rune Olsen (born 12 February 1962, in Røros Municipality) is a Norwegian cancer researcher, professor of biomedical physics at the University of Bergen, and the current rector of the University of Tromsø, where he was hired in 2021. He was the elected rector of the University of Bergen from 2013-2020.

== Academic career ==
In April 2013, Dag Rune Olsen was elected the new rector of the University of Bergen with 59% of the votes. He took over the position from Sigmund Grønmo on August 1, 2013. In his campaign he emphasized the importance of developing the university further as an international research university. He has also been the dean at the Faculty of Mathematics and Natural Sciences (2010–2013).

Before coming to Bergen, he was working at the Institute of Cancer Research at the Oslo University Hospital. He obtained his PhD in medical physics from the University of Oslo in 1999.
