= List of universities in Norway =

This list of universities in Norway presents the country's universities, giving their locations, ownership, and years of establishment.

Denmark-Norway only had one university, the University of Copenhagen. In 1811, the Royal Frederick's University (now the University of Oslo) was established, based on the traditions and curriculum of the University of Copenhagen and effectively as a Norwegian successor institution. It remains the country's highest ranked university, and was Norway's only university until 1946. In the postwar era the University of Bergen, the University of Trondheim (now NTNU), and the University of Tromsø (now UiT The Arctic University of Norway) were founded. These universities are known as the "old universities".

Norway also has a number of university colleges, that are traditionally focused on vocational programs such as nursing or teacher education. Several of these colleges have received university status in recent years, and are referred to as "new universities," in contrast to the "old universities."

Most of the university colleges were created in 1994, following the university college reform. The Arctic University of Norway is the world's northernmost. Schools with an asterisk (*) have been created as the result of a merger.

== Universities ==
Universities have the right to establish study programmes at all levels and all subjects.

Name	Main Location	Other Locations	Control	Established
Nord University	Bodø	Levanger, Mo i Rana, Namsos, Nesna, Steinkjer, Stjørdalshalsen, Vesterålen	State	1994* (Note: Until 2010, Bodø University College and until 2015, University of Nordland)
Norwegian University of Life Sciences (NMBU)	Ås		State	1859 (Note: Until 2005, Agricultural University College at Ås)
Norwegian University of Science and Technology (NTNU)	Trondheim	Gjøvik, Ålesund	State	1996*
OsloMet - Oslo Metropolitan University	Oslo	Kjeller	State	2018*
University of Agder	Kristiansand	Grimstad	State	1994* (Note: Until 2007, Agder University College)
University of Bergen	Bergen		State	1948
University of Inland Norway		Blæstad, Elverum, Evenstad, Hamar, Kongsvinger, Lillehammer, Rena, Tynset	State	2017*
University of Oslo	Oslo		State	1811
University of South-Eastern Norway		Bø, Drammen, Kongsberg, Notodden, Porsgrunn, Rauland, Hønefoss, Horten	State	2016*
University of Stavanger	Stavanger		State	1994* (Note: Until 2005, Stavanger University College)
University of Tromsø – The Arctic University of Norway	Tromsø	Alta, Bardufoss, Bodø, Hammerfest, Harstad, Kabelvåg, Kirkenes, Mo i Rana, Narvik, Svalbard	State	1972

== Specialized universities ==
In the Norwegian education system, a specialized university is an educational institution at university level within narrower subject areas, with the same type of responsibilities and powers for education, research and research training. Specialized Universities can accredit study programmes at bachelor’s degree level in all subject areas. They can also accredit study programmes at all levels in subjects in which they have been granted the right to award doctoral degrees.

Name	Location(s)	Control	Established
BI Norwegian Business School	Bergen, Oslo, Stavanger, Trondheim	Private	1943
MF Norwegian School of Theology, Religion and Society	Oslo	Private	1907
Molde University College - Specialized University in Logistics	Molde, Kristiansund	State	1994*
Norwegian Academy of Music	Oslo	State	1973
Norwegian School of Economics	Bergen	State	1936
Norwegian School of Sport Sciences	Oslo	State	1968
Oslo National Academy of the Arts	Oslo	State	1996
Oslo School of Architecture and Design	Oslo	State	1968
VID Specialized University	Bergen, Helgeland, Oslo, Sandvika, Stavanger, Tromsø	Private	2016*

== University colleges / Universities of applied sciences ==
University colleges / Universities of applied sciences can accredit study programmes at bachelor’s degree level in all subject areas. They can also accredit study programmes at all levels in subjects in which they have been granted the right to award doctoral degrees.

Name	Location(s)	Control	Established
Ansgar University College	Kristiansand	Private	2005
Bergen School of Architecture	Bergen	Private	1986
Fjellhaug International University College	Oslo	Private	1898*
Lovisenberg Diaconal University College	Oslo	Private	1994
Kristiania University College	Bergen, Oslo	Private	1914
NLA University College	Bergen, Kristiansand, Oslo	Private	1968
Norwegian Defence University College	Bergen, Lillehammer, Oslo, Trondheim	State	2017*
Norwegian Police University College	Bodø, Kongsvinger, Oslo, Stavern	State	1992
Norwegian School of Leadership and Theology	Oslo, Stavanger	Private	2008
Queen Maud University College	Trondheim	Private	1947*
Sámi University of Applied Sciences	Kautokeino	State	1989
Volda University College	Volda	State	1994*
Western Norway University of Applied Sciences	Bergen, Førde, Haugesund, Sogndalsfjøra, Stord.	State	2017*
Østfold University College	Fredrikstad, Halden	State	1994*

== University colleges with accredited study programs ==
The following list includes colleges with accredited study programmes, i.e. institutions which are not designated as higher education institutions as such, but which have been accredited for one (or more) studies at higher education level. An institution can, for example, have a bachelor's degree in a specific study accredited by NOKUT without the institution itself being accredited at that level. Institutions with accredited study programs can use the designation "university college", even if they do not have institutional college accreditation. They also fall under the Universities and Colleges Act, and can use the protected title of professor.

Name	Location(s)	Control	Established
Barratt Due Institute of Music	Oslo	Private	1927
Høyskolen for yrkesfag	Gjøvik, Porsgrunn	County	2015
Lillehammer Institute of Music Production and Industries (LIMPI)	Lillehammer	Private	2018
Norges Høyskole for Helsefag	Oslo	Private	1987
Noroff University College	Bergen, Kristiansand, Oslo, Stavanger	Private	1987
The Norwegian Gestalt Institute	Sandvika	Private	1986
The Norwegian Institute of Children's Books	Oslo	Private	1979
Norwegian University College of Green Development	Bryne	Private	2001
NSKI University College	Oslo	Private	2009
Rudolf Steiner University College	Oslo	Private	1981
Oslo New University College	Oslo	Private	1998
Skrivekunstakademiet	Bergen	Private/County	1985
University College of Dance Art	Oslo	Private	2015
University College of Norwegian Correctional Service	Lillestrøm	State	1937

== See also ==
- Open access in Norway
