= Higher education in Norway =

Higher education in Norway is offered by a range of ten universities, nine specialised universities (focused on a specific program area), 24 university colleges as well as a range of private university colleges. The national higher education system is in accordance with the Bologna process, with bachelor's degrees (first cycle, three years), master's degrees (second cycle, two years) and doctoral degrees (third cycle, three years). Acceptance is offered after finishing upper secondary school and meeting general university admissions certification.

Public education is free for citizens from any country that is part of EU, the European Economic Area or Switzerland, but everyone else needs to pay a tuition fee to the university. The tuition fee can range from 80,000 NOK to 400,000 NOK per academic year.

The higher education in Norway is divided into an academic year with two semesters, from August to December and from January to June. The ultimate responsibility for the education lies with the Norwegian Ministry of Education and Research.

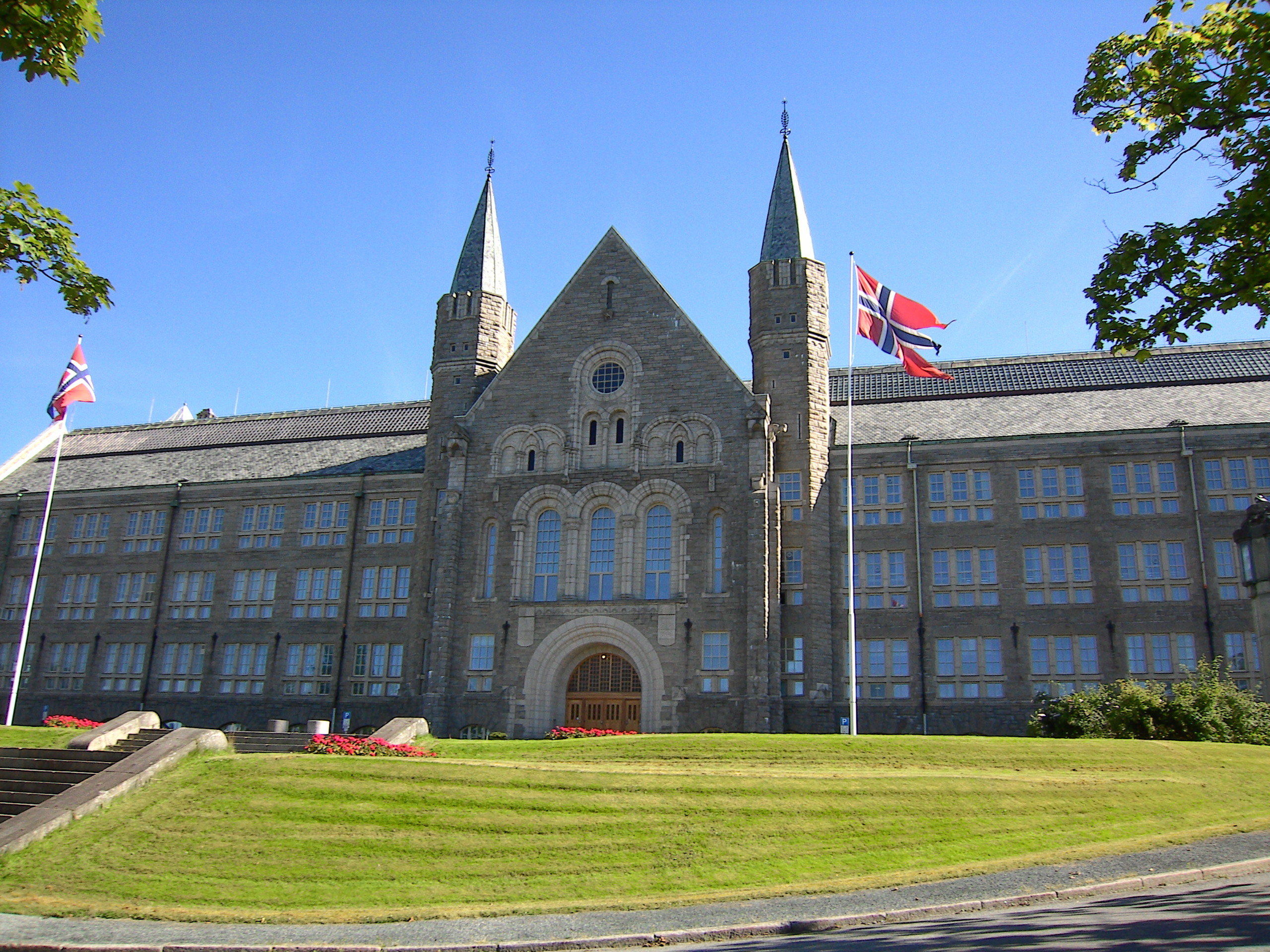
The main building of the Norwegian University of Science and Technology in Trondheim.

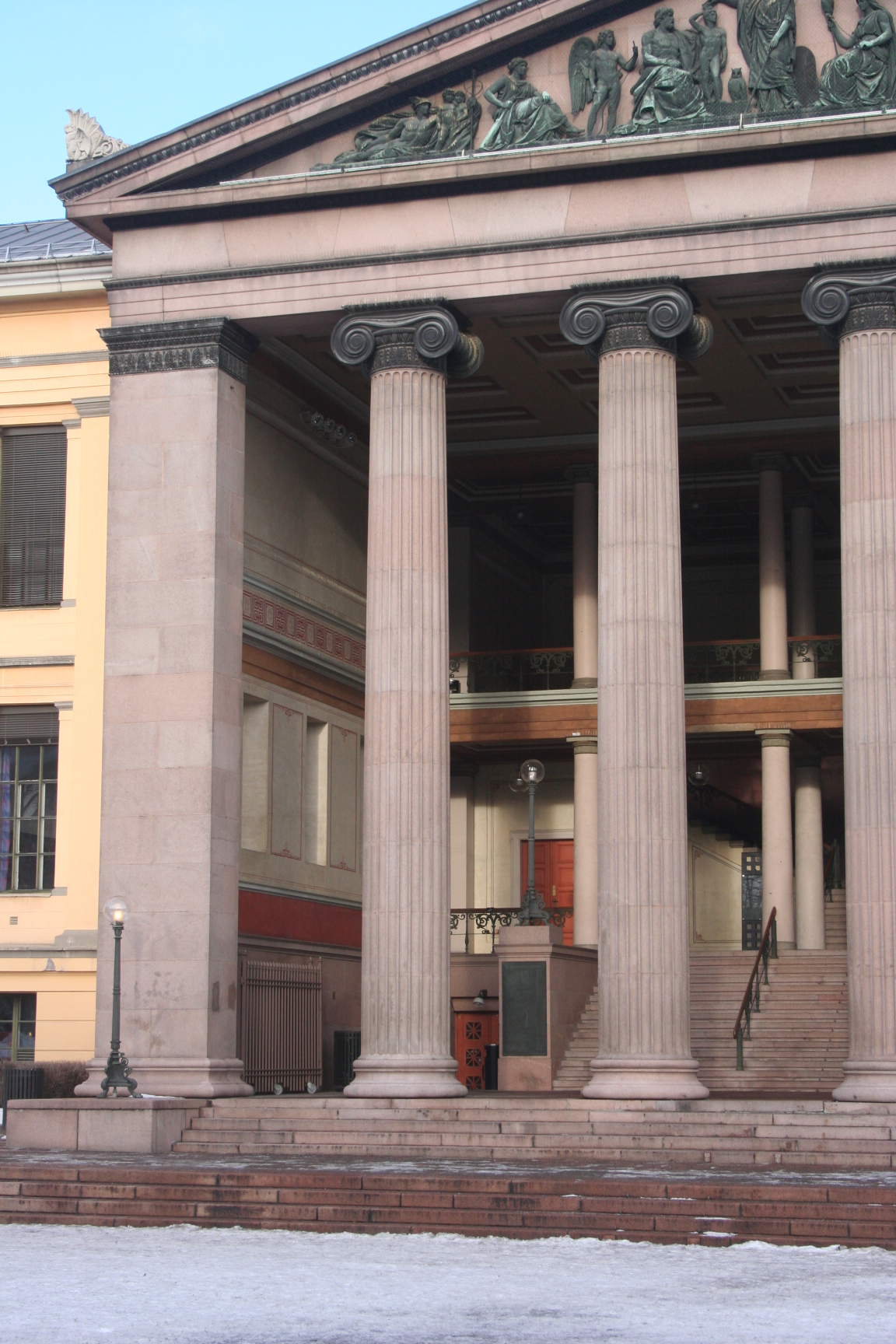
The University of Oslo, established in 1811, is the oldest university in Norway

== System ==
=== Admission ===
Acceptance to higher education requires either fulfilled three years of upper secondary school with general university admissions certification. This is awarded non-vocational students or vocational students who choose to not take their apprenticeship. Conversely study competence can be achieved by the so-called 23/5 rule where applicants must be 23 years of age and have a total of five years of upper secondary education and work experience as well as have passed courses in Norwegian, English, mathematics, science and social studies. To be accepted as certain lines (for instance engineering) advanced courses in mathematics, physics and chemistry must be passed.

Admission to bachelor level programs is coordinated through the Norwegian Universities and Colleges Admission Service based on a point scale, with the highest ranking students offered a place. Points are awarded based on average grades from upper secondary school, but additional points are awarded students with secondary two-year course specialization, science specialization, age and fulfilled one year of higher education, military service or folk high school. Secondary school grades can be improved to increase points, but 40% of the places are only offered based on original transcripts without age or study points.

=== Structure ===
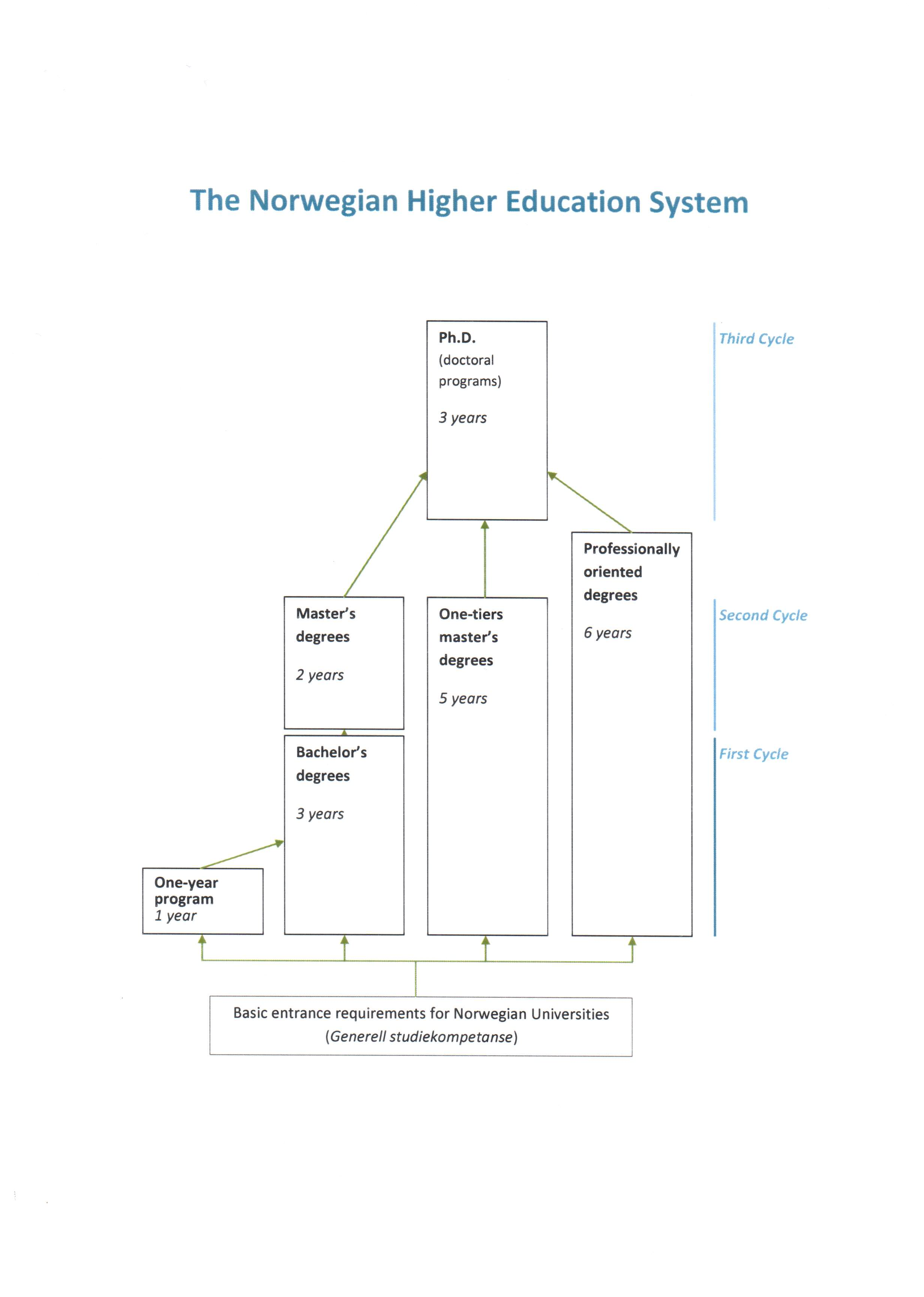

In 2003 a national reform, called the Quality reform, was implemented throughout the entire national higher education system. Norway was one of the first countries in Europe to implement the Bologna convention, thus creating a 3+2+3 year system in accordance with the Bologna Process.

A further step was taken in 2005 when the Act Relating to Universities and University Colleges and the Private Higher Education Institutions Act were merged into one common Act, the Act relating to universities and university colleges. The common act ensures greater equality between the public and private higher education institutions, thus focusing more on the quality in higher education than ownership. The evaluation of Quality Assurance Systems at and accreditation of both public and private institutions are handled by a national agency for quality assurance, NOKUT.

==== First Cycle ====
Most students that fulfill the requirements for entrance to higher education in Norway are accepted to three-year Bachelor programs.

==== Second Cycle ====
Entrance to the two-year master programs are based upon the academic qualifications (grades) from the bachelor level.

Some programs (including architecture, business management at NHH, engineering at NTNU), Master of Dentistry and Master of Laws are five-year programs (one-tier degrees).

Three types of master's degrees are offered: Master of Science (science and business), Master of Philosophy (humanities and social studies) and Master of Technology (engineering).

===== Professional Degrees =====
Some professional oriented programs have been granted an exemption from the Bologna system. Physicians (cand.med.), veterinarians (cand.med.vet.), psychologist (cand.psychol.) and theologians (cand.theol.) are therefore still awarded degrees for six years of study.

==== Third Cycle ====
Doctor Philosophae degrees are awarded after three years of research-oriented education. Most programs also include one year of compulsory teaching as part of the education, making the total length of the program four years.

==== System of Grading ====
According to the ECTS-system the grading are given according to scale of six grades, ranging from an A to F, with A being the best and E the worst passing grade. F is a fail.

A normal study progression awards 60 credits (stp) per year (30 per semester), most institutions either use a 7.5 or a 10 credit block system.

Examinations are usually held every semester, in December and June, although exceptions occur.

=== Old system ===
Prior to 2002 the higher education in Norway had a significantly different system of education with roots back to the start of higher education in the country. It was based on a 3.5 or 4 year cand.mag. degree supplemented with a Masters or hovedfag lasting 1.5 or 2 years. Total study time was five years within sciences while it was six years within social studies and humanities. Master's degrees were named based on the line of study, for instance cand.scient. within science, cand.polit. in political studies or cand.oecon. within economics. Certain professional studies, such as medicine, law, and some engineering and business administration courses had professional studies that offered full-length degrees (without issuing cand.mag. titles). The titles awarded were cand.jur. (law, 6 years), cand.med. (medical doctor, 6 years), cand.psychol. (doctor of psychology, 6 years), siviløkonom (business administration, 4 years) or sivilingeniør (engineering, 4.5 years). NHH had a monopoly educating siviløkonoms while NTH had a monopoly educating sivilingeniørs. Doctorate studies were offered on top of the masters.

Grading was performed on a 1.0 to 4.0 system, with 1.0 as the best grade and 4.0 the worst passing grade. A total of 41 different grades could be awarded with the system. Credits (then called vekttall) were issued based on a nominal study of 20 credits per year (or 10 per semester).

== Institutions ==
=== Universities ===
Traditionally there were only four universities in Norway, located in Oslo (since 1811), Bergen (1948), Trondheim (1968) and Tromsø (1972). Since 2005 any college offering five master programs and four doctoral programs can title themselves a university, leading to the Norwegian University of Life Sciences, Stavanger University College and Agder University College converting to universities.

The public universities of Norway are:

- Nord University (Several campuses in North Trøndelag and Nordland counties)
- Norwegian University of Life Sciences (Ås)
- Norwegian University of Science and Technology (Trondheim, Ålesund and Gjøvik)
- Oslo Metropolitan University (Oslo) (official site)
- The Arctic University of Norway (Several campuses in Finnmark, Troms and Nordland counties)
- University of Agder (Kristiansand, Grimstad and Arendal)
- University of Bergen
- University of Inland Norway
- University of Oslo
- University of South-Eastern Norway
- University of Stavanger

Currently there are no private universities in Norway, although BI Norwegian Business School has tried to advance to a full university.

=== Specialised universities ===
There are six public and three private specialised universities in Norway, each functioning as a national competence centre for the field they represent. Six are located in Oslo, one is in Molde, one is in Bergen and one in Stavanger. The Norwegian Institute of Technology and the Norwegian College of Agriculture have converted to full universities.

The public specialised universities in Norway are:

- Oslo School of Architecture and Design, or Arkitektur- og designhøgskolen i Oslo (official site)
- Molde University College, or Høgskolen i Molde (official site)
- Norwegian School of Economics, or Norges Handelshøyskole (official site)
- Norwegian School of Sport Sciences, or Norges idrettshøgskole (official site)
- Norwegian Academy of Music, or Norges musikkhøgskole (official site)
- Norwegian School of Veterinary Science, or Norges vetrinærhøgskole (official site)

The private specialised universities are:

- BI Norwegian Business School, or Handelshøyskolen BI (official site)
- MF Norwegian School of Theology, or Det teologiske Menighetsfakultet (official site)
- VID Specialized University in Oslo, Stavanger, Sandness, Tromso VID vitenskapelige høgskole (official site)

=== University colleges ===
The 23 university colleges in Norway are responsible for regional education of primarily bachelor level education within the fields of nursing, teaching, business management, engineering and information technology, though most colleges also offer a number of other academic degrees as well.

The public university colleges in Norway consist of:

- Western Norway University of Applied Sciences, or Høgskolen på Vestlandet (official site)
- Norwegian Defence University College, or Forsvarets høgskole (official site)
- Norwegian Police University College, or Politihøgskolen (official site)
- Oslo National Academy of the Arts, or Kunsthøgskolen i Oslo (official site)
- Sámi University of Applied Sciences, or Samisk høgskole (official site)
- Volda University College, or Høgskulen i Volda (official site)
- Østfold University College, or Høgskolen i Østfold (official site)

The accredited private university colleges in Norway are:

- Diakonhjemmet University College, or Diakonhjemmet Høgskole (official site)
- NLA University College, or NLA Høgskolen (official site)
- Queen Maud University College or Dronning Mauds Minne Høgskole (official site)

=== Private institutions ===
There are a number of private higher education institutions in Norway, although the public institution cover more than ninety per cent of the student population in the country, meaning that less than ten per cent of students attend private institutions.

The private institutions offer primarily programs and courses within popular fields of study where the number of public places is limited or offering accelerated courses. However some provide specialised courses not found in the public institutions such as Noroff University College in Kristiansand.

Most of the private institutions are foundations, either autonomous (like the BI Norwegian Business School and Kristiania University College) or part of various religious societies, like the School of Missions and Theology or Queen Maud University College.

Students attending private institutions may have to pay school fees equivalent to the entire cost of operating the education, though the Norwegian State Educational Loan Fund will grant loans to cover the tuition fees.

== Student welfare and economics ==
There are no tuition fees for attending public higher education in Norway, as all the costs are covered by the Ministry of Education and Research.

Students are also given the opportunity to apply for financial support (a part loan/part grant) from the Norwegian State Educational Loan Fund. The main requirement for support from Fund is that you are a Norwegian citizen. However, foreign citizens may also be entitled to financial support.

Eligible applicants may be granted financial support (a part loan/part grant) of about NOK 90,000. It is initially given as a full loan, but upon completion of modules in the education around 40 percent of the amount is transferred to a scholarship/grant if the modules are passed. There is no interest paid while taking the education.

While studying, all students belong to a student welfare organisation that takes care of such services as housing, on-campus dining, book stores, kindergartens, advisory services and some health care. Part of this is finances through a student fee, typically at NOK 300–500 per semester. There are a total of 25 such organisations, each covering a geographic area and often consisting of more than one institution. The sole exception is Oslo where there are two.

== Programmes ==
The five main universities in Bergen, Oslo, Trondheim, Tromsø and Stavanger all offer a wide selection of courses within most fields, while certain minor fields have been left to the specialised universities, including veterinary studies and sports. Many educations are left to the regional colleges.

=== Architecture ===
Architecture is only offered at two public institutions, NTNU in Trondheim and the Oslo School of Architecture and Design. In addition the private college Bergen School of Architecture offers architect education. NTNU accepts students based on grades while the Oslo School accepts students based on a portfolio. Landscape architecture and area planning is offered at the Norwegian University of Life Sciences at Ås.

=== Business administration ===
Most business administrators are educated at the regional colleges throughout the country, with Bachelor programs offered in Alta, Tromsø, Narvik, Bodø, Steinkjer, Trondheim, Molde, Ålesund, Sogndal, Bergen, Haugesund, Stavanger, Kristiansand, Kongsberg, Oslo, Ås, Halden, Lillehammer, Gjøvik and Hamar. In addition NHH in Bergen is the specialised college offering the highest level of education within the field. Business administration is also offered at some private colleges, most notably the BI Norwegian Business School in Oslo.

Eight institutions offer a Master of Science in Business Administration, also granting the right to use the protected title siviløkonom. These are Bodø Graduate School of Business, Trondheim Business School, Molde University College, the Norwegian School of Economics and Business Administration, the University of Stavanger, the University of Agder, BI Norwegian Business School and the Norwegian University of Life Sciences. Until the 1980s this level of education was only offered at NHH.

=== Engineering ===
In general, three-year bachelor's degrees in engineering are offered throughout the country at the regional colleges, most dominantly within the fields of construction, chemistry, electronics and informatics, though many others also exist. Five-year Master of Technology degrees are offered as well, primarily at the Norwegian University of Science and Technology (NTNU) in Trondheim and the University of Stavanger (UiS), though also at some other institutions to a lesser degree. Candidates with three years of education can apply to attend the last two years at NTNU or UiS to complete a Master's study. All Master engineers can use the protected title sivilingeniør. NTNU offers 14 different programs in engineering, whereas UiS only offers 8 different studies in engineering.

=== Law ===
The traditional five year long integrated Master of Laws (LLM) education is offered at the universities of Oslo, Bergen and Tromsø. Upon graduation one is given the title "Master i Rettsvitenskap" (Master of Laws, LLM). As of 2023, the University of Agder offers a two - year postgraduate master's degree in law, resulting in the same title In order to become a practicing lawyer, one has to work as a lawyer's apprentice (advokatfullmektig) for at least two years and have had five cases before a judge.

=== Medicine ===
Medicine is offered at the four of the five major universities in Oslo, Bergen, Trondheim and Tromsø, who have close cooperation with the university hospitals in the cities. Medical education takes six years and still grants the old cand.med. degree. After school candidates are required 1.5 years of practice before being granted certification. After six additional years of work experience they are awarded specialist certification.

=== Psychology ===
In contrast to other countries, Norway requires a six year long professional degree in order to earn the title of psychologist. Whereas in other countries one can become a psychologist by way of first obtaining a bachelor's degree and then (depending on the nations system) either pursue a master's degree in the field or go straight to a PsyD degree, Norwegian psychologists are required to have obtained a cand.psychol degree in order to be licensed as a psychologist.

The six - year professional degree (cand.psychol) is as of 2024 only offered at the four traditional universities of Norway; The University of Oslo, NTNU, University of Bergen and The University of Tromsø. Although attempts have been made to offer this degree at other universities, none have succeeded in doing so as of 2024. In 2023, The University of Agder's request to do so was denied by NOKUT (The Norwegian Agency for Quality Assurance in Education).

It is also possible to pursue a bachelor's, master's and Ph.D degree in the field outside of the cand.psychol track. Although, as stated this will not result in the title nor the right to practice as a psychologist in the country. However, that does not mean that the traditional cand.psychol degree offered at Norwegian universities is the only way to gain said title. Norwegian students can apply to bachelor's degrees in psychology that offer the same courses as universities abroad and thus enable one to apply to a two - year long master's programme in countries that accept this track. Usually Norwegian students in such instances apply to Danish universities. As the master's programme for clinical psychology in the country is closely aligned with the cand.psychol track. Thus, upon graduation from the master's programme the students can apply for accreditation from NOKUT (The Norwegian Agency for Quality Assurance in Education) and if they meet the requirements, become licensed psychologists in Norway.

=== Educational Sciences (Pedagogy) ===
There are two ways to become a qualified teacher in Norway. For primary and lower secondary levels a four-year general teacher education is offered at most regional colleges in the country. This education qualifies the teachers to teach all subjects offered in the lower levels of education in Norway, though it allows students to specialize in subjects. Preschool teaching is offered at some of the regional colleges too.

For upper secondary school taking a degree at a university within the appropriate subject is the preferred course of line. After taking a degree, either at Bachelor or Master level, a one-year course in pedagogy is required before teacher certification is granted. To teach a particular subject at the upper secondary level, 60 credits in the appropriate field is required, making most teachers qualified to teach two or three subjects, though these are not absolute requirements.

=== Sciences ===
Virtually all education within the sciences are offered at the five major universities, in Bergen, Oslo, Trondheim, Tromsø and Stavanger, though some regional colleges have one-years or perhaps Bachelor programs in certain fields.

=== Journalism ===
Education in journalism is offered at most institutions in Norway. Ranging from year long programmes up to master's level

== See also ==
- Academic ranks in Norway
- List of universities in Norway
