= Blandina Theophil Mmbaga =

Tanzanian researcher and professor

- Citizenship: Tanzanian
- Occupations: Researcher, Academic
- Title: Professor

Academic background
- Education: PhD
- Alma mater: University of Bergen, Norway

Academic work
- Discipline: Paediatric
- Institutions: Tumaini University Makumira (KCMUC)

Blandina Theophil Mmbaga is a Tanzanian Pediatrician, researcher and university professor.

== Education ==
Blandina Theophil Mmbaga obtained her medical degree from Nizhny Novgorod State Medical Academy, Russia. She went on to get her Masaters in Medicine(MMED) at KCM-College, Tumaini University in Moshi, Tanzania. In 2013, she got her PhD in Public Health and Epidemiology from the University of Bergen, Norway.

== Career ==
Blandina Theophil Mmbaga has had a career spanning through academics, medical and administrative positions.

- Director of Research at Kilimanjaro Clinical Research Institute (KCRI)
- Paediatrician at Kilimanjaro Christian Medical Centre (KCMC)
- Associate Professor of Paediatric and Child Health at the KCMC University in Moshi, Tanzania.
- Adjunct Professor of Global Health at the Duke Global Health Institute
- Adjunct Professor of Paediatrics and Child Health at University College Cork in Ireland
- Lecturer at the Kilimanjaro Christian Medical University College of the Tumaini University Makumira (KCMUC)

== Recognition ==
In 2023, Blandina Theophil Mmbaga was elected as a Fellow of the African Academy of Science.
