= Espegrend =

Marine biological field station in Berger, Norway

Coordinates: 60.2697°N 5.2230°E

Espegrend (also known as Espeland) is a marine biological field station located in Bergen, Norway. The station is located close to the airport Flesland, 20 kilometers south of Bergen.

== Overview ==
The Department of Biological Sciences at the University of Bergen has specialized laboratories and research installations in the main campus in downtown Bergen. It is also responsible for the Marine biological field station at Espeland. The Station is located in the Raunefjord, with deep sea fauna easily available. The station has good mesocosm facilities, a research vessel RV Aurelia, and good facilities for benthic and planktonic sampling. Espegrend has a number of specialised facilities. It is well known for is mesocosm facility. Espegrend has very good access to diverse and well described marine habitats and model environments. The station comprises a boarding house, boats, laboratories and basic equipment for marine research.
