= Pinar Heggernes =

Turkish-born Norwegian computer scientist

Pinar Heggernes (born 1969) is a Turkish-born Norwegian computer scientist known for her research on graph algorithms, sparse matrix computations, and parameterized complexity. Until July 2025, she was the deputy rector of the University of Bergen, elected together with rector Margareth Hagen for the period 2021–2025. Until August 2021, she was the head of the Department of Informatics at the University of Bergen. She is also a member of the board of directors of the Research Council of Norway, appointed for the period 2019–2022.

== Education and career ==
Heggernes was born in 1969 in Istanbul. She was educated at the University of Bergen, earning bachelor's and master's degrees there in 1990 and 1992, and completing her Ph.D. there in 1996. Her dissertation, Partitioning and Ordering Graphs for Sparse Matrix Computations, was supervised by Bengt Aspvall.

After working at a research laboratory in Norway, and then as a postdoctoral researcher at the University of Bergen, she became a faculty member in informatics in 2001, and head of the department in 2018. She has also been a visiting professor at the University of Oregon, at Boğaziçi University in Istanbul, and at the University of Primorska in Slovenia. In 2021, she was elected deputy rector of the University of Bergen.

== Recognition ==
Heggernes was elected to the Norwegian Academy of Technological Sciences in 2014.

== Personal ==
Heggernes is also an amateur competitor in outdoor running events.
