= Jan Fridthjof Bernt =

Norwegian academic

- Born: July 6, 1943 (age 83)
- Awards: Knight of the Order of St. Olav; Grand Knight of the Order of the Falcon

Academic background
- Education: University of Oslo; University of Michigan; University of Bergen

Jan Fridthjof Bernt (born 6 July 1943) is a Norwegian professor of law and former rector (1996-1998) at the University of Bergen.

He graduated with the cand.jur. degree from the University of Oslo in 1968, with the Master of Comparative Law from the University of Michigan in 1971 and took the dr.juris degree at the University of Bergen in 1979. In 1980, he was appointed as professor of law at the University of Bergen. He was elected as rector of the university from 1996 to 1998.

He is the chairman of the Chr. Michelsen Institute and the Ludvig Holberg Memorial Fund, and a board member of Transparency International, Norway.

He is a former praeces of the Norwegian Academy of Science and Letters, and has been proclaimed Knight of the Order of St. Olav (2000) and Grand Knight of the Icelandic Order of the Falcon.

Academic offices
Preceded by Ole Didrik Lærum	Rector of the University of Bergen; 1996–1998	Succeeded by Kirsti Koch Christensen
