= Molde University College =

University in Molde, Norway

Molde University College - Specialized University in Logistics
- Høgskolen i Molde - Vitenskapelig høgskole i logistikk
- Motto: Annerledes og bedre
- Type: Specialized University
- Established: 1994; 32 years ago
- Rector: Steinar Kristoffersen
- Students: 3,800
- Location: Molde, Møre og Romsdal, Norway; 62.7366°N 7.1091°E
- Website: www.himolde.no/english/

Molde University College - Specialized University in Logistics (Norwegian: Høgskolen i Molde - Vitenskapelig høgskole i logistikk, abbreviated HiM or HiMolde) is a Norwegian specialized university. It is located in the town of Molde in Molde Municipality, Møre og Romsdal county, Norway. The university offers higher education in business administration, logistics, information technology, and health sciences.

Degrees are offered both at Bachelor, Master of Science, and PhD level. The institution belonged to the university colleges until 1 January 2010, when it received its new status as a specialized university in logistics. It is one of nine specialized universities in the Norwegian higher education system. The main campus is in Molde, but some study programs are offered in Kristiansund. Møre Research Institute is also located on campus.

== Study programs ==
=== Bachelor degree programs ===
- Social Studies
- Business Administration
- Logistics
- Sports Management
- Information Technology
- Health Sciences

=== Masters degree programs ===
- MSc in Logistics
- MSc in Engineering Logistics
- MSc in Petroleum Logistics
- MSc in Event Management
- MSc in Team Sport Management
- MSc in Business Administration

=== Doctoral degree programs ===
- PhD in Logistics
- PhD in Health Sciences
