= Hogeschool =

Hogeschool is a Dutch word that refers to a certain type of institution of higher education.

- Since 1986 in the Netherlands, it has been translated as a university of applied sciences.
- Before 1986 in the Netherlands, it signified a research school with a limited scope (e.g. Katholieke Economische Hogeschool Tilburg, Technische Hogeschool Delft, Landbouw Hogeschool Wageningen). These schools were renamed universities in 1986.
- In Belgium, it is translated as a university college.
- In Indonesia, it is translated as sekolah tinggi, which are higher education institutions that provide academic education and/or vocational education within the scope of one discipline of science, technology, and/or art and, if they meet the requirements, can provide professional education.

== See also ==
- Hochschule
