= Bjerknes Centre for Climate Research =

Climate research centre in Bergen, Norway

The Bjerknes Centre for Climate Research is a climate research centre in Bergen, Norway. The centres key areas of research is natural variability in the Earth system and man-made climate change. The centre combines observations with theoretical and modelling studies of past, present and future climates. Both Global and Polar regions are studied.

The centre was started in 2000 and is a co-operation between University of Bergen, Institute of Marine Research, the Nansen Environmental and Remote Sensing Center and NORCE (formerly Uni Research). The centre was part of Research Council of Norway's Centre of Excellence program from 2003 to 2013 and then had Eystein Jansen as the director. Tore Furevik was the director until 2021, and since then Kikki Kleiven has been leading the Bjerknes Center.

Researchers from the Bjerknes Centre have taken part in the Intergovernmental Panel on Climate Change assessment reports; Eystein Jansen as one of the lead authors in the fourth report. Asgeir Sorteberg in the Special Report on managing the risks of extreme events and disasters to advance climate change adaption (SREX). Eystein Jansen, Peter Thorne and Christoph Heinze have been respectively lead authors and review editor in the IPCC Working Group 1, for the IPCC Fifth Assessment Report.

It is named after Vilhelm Bjerknes and his son Jacob Bjerknes, who did much to found the modern practice of weather forecasting.
