= Arctic Ice Project =

Non-profit Organization

The Arctic Ice Project was a Silicon Valley non-profit research organization that aimed to slow climate change by restoring ice in the Arctic. They saw their scientific research in ice preservation technologies as an opportunity to buy up to 15 more years for the world's economies to decarbonize. The organization had built an innovation network of prestigious external scientific partnerships that included the top specialists and organizations in the climate field in order to coordinate a moonshot effort to stop Arctic ice melt in key portions of the Arctic, our planet's heat-shield.

The project announced in 2025 that it will be concluding its research and shut down.

== Proposed Solution ==
The Arctic Ice Project's approach was to spread hollow silica microspheres (reflective sand) on top of ice in the Arctic. The intended effect of the microspheres was to raise the reflecting power of polar ice. This would have reduced the amount of sunlight absorbed, and slowed the melting of the ice.

The microspheres are bright white, and each one is 35 microns in diameter (less than the diameter of a human hair). The microspheres are filled with air and they float. The vision was to cover a strategic area of the Arctic about the size of Belgium with microspheres. Target locations will be near communities that depend on the ice, and routes through which melting ice reaches the wider ocean.

The Arctic Ice Project aimed to rebuild a natural system with the least possible intervention. The Arctic Ice Project's silica microspheres should have dissolved over time. This is a form of “soft geoengineering”. It is claimed to be less damaging and more reversible than other techniques.

Some scientists were concerned about the risks of restoring Arctic ice, as this approach could have unintended consequences. The Arctic Ice Project maintains that its approach will not drastically alter the ecosystem or pollute the environment.

To have a substantial effect, an estimated annual amount of 360 million tons of microspheres (equivalent to the amount of plastics produced worldwide) would have had to be spread by an armada of ships. An estimation of the reflective effect of the microspheres by independent research concluded that the proposed intervention could even have had a warming effect. This was disputed by members of the Arctic Ice Project.
