= Bernt Østhus =

Norwegian businessman

Bernt Østhus (born December 18, 1970) is a lawyer and investor based in Trondheim, Norway. He graduated from the University of Bergen in 1994, and has since worked, primarily as a private equity investor.

Mr. Østhus served as the chief executive officer of Notar Advokat until 1998, before becoming the Founder and chief executive officer of Pretor Advokat AS until 2008. Since January 2005, Mr. Østhus has served as a Managing Partner of Staur Holding AS, a family-owned investment company. He has held several chairman of the Board positions in companies such as Petricore Ltd, Aqualyng Holding AS, Fram Exploration ASA and ResLab Reservoir Laboratories AS. He co-founded the Pareto Staur Energy Fund in 2011 and the private equity fund Longship, in 2015.

Bernt Østhus is a passionate Nature Photographer, and was awarded Norwegian Nature Photographer of the Year in 2014, 2016, and 2017. He won the 2012 "Norwegian Nature Photo of the Year" award. He has also received awards in international photo competitions, such as GDT Wildlife Photographer of the Year and NNPC.

In 2014, the Østhus family unanimously won a highly publicized arbitration case, regarding the sale of Norsk Kylling to Rema 1000.
