= Queen Maud University College =

Norwegian private college

Queen Maud University College of Early Childhood Education
- Dronning Mauds Minne Høgskole for barnehagelærerutdanning
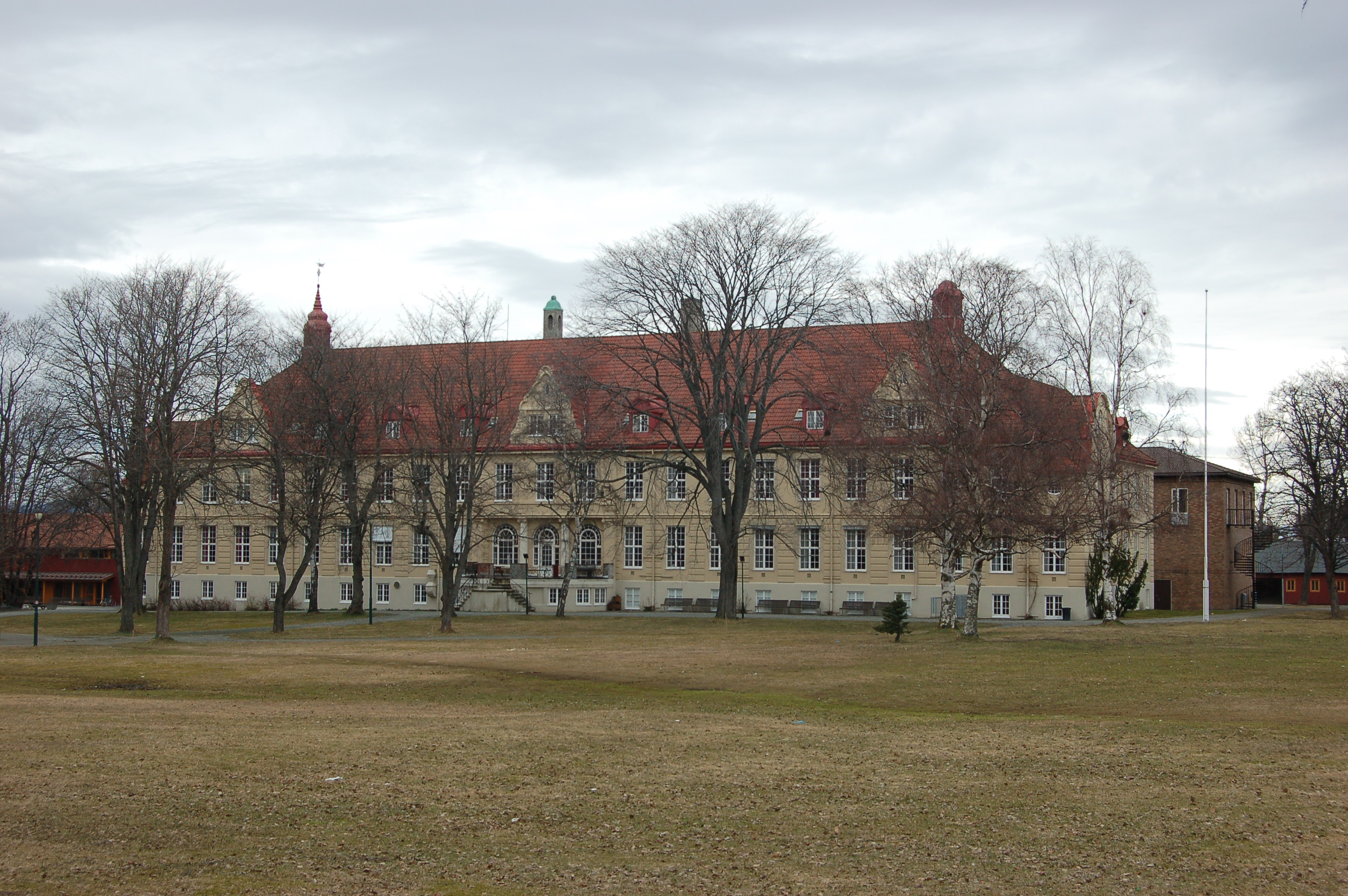
- Type: Private college
- Established: 1947; 79 years ago
- Affiliations: Church of Norway
- Rector: Hans-Jørgen Leksen
- Academic staff: 95
- Administrative staff: 45
- Students: 1200
- Location: Trondheim, Norway; 63°26′20.35″N 10°26′57.6″E
- Campus: Urban
- Website: dmmh.no

Queen Maud University College or QMUC (Norwegian: Dronning Mauds Minne Høgskole or DMMH) is a private college for preschool teachers located in Trondheim, Norway. The college has about 1,200 students and 140 employees. It educates 17% of all preschool teachers in Norway. The college is organised as a foundation within the Church of Norway and the school is the only college in Norway solely dedicated to the education of preschool teachers. The school is located in an old majestic building from 1912 at Leangen, though the college itself dates back to 1947.
