= Professional studies =

Education leading to a professional degree

"Professional studies" is a term used to classify academic programs which are applied or interdisciplinary in focus. The term can also be used for non-academic training for a specific profession. Research on professionals can be seen as a multidisciplinary field of research with a multiple of perspectives in theory and by methods.

Professional studies usually combine theory and practice-based professional learning, focusing on a body of knowledge that is more strictly delineated and canonical than non-professional studies. Students are trained to ensure expected standards and adequate service delivery in the best practice of a profession.

One aspect of professional action that has been widely studied in professional studies is tacit knowledge (cf. Polyani 1967), including professional judgment, discretion or fronesis, a term from the Greek philosopher Aristotle, also called practical intelligence or knowledge (see Dunne 1997; McGuirk 2013).

Professional studies may lead to academic degrees such as the Bachelor of Professional Studies (BPS), Master of Professional Studies (MPS), or Doctor of Professional Studies (DPS). A BPS is similar to a Bachelor of General Studies with a greater emphasis on practical and technical training (and a corresponding lower emphasis on liberal arts), and therefore of greater interest to mid-career students. MPS degrees are usually course-based with a report or project component rather than a research thesis. The US National Science Foundation considers a DPS to be equivalent to a PhD.

In Germany, new higher professional degrees were introduced at the beginning of 2020. The new Bachelor Professional and Master Professional have been equivalent to other bachelor's and master's degrees. The basis for this are §§ 53c and d of the Vocational Training Act (BBiG).

Some music schools like Curtis Institute of Music offer postgraduate programs that result in a Professional Studies Certificate. Other schools, like the Manhattan School of Music require a master's degree or postgraduate diploma in order to attend the program.

== See also ==
- Bachelor
