= University of Bergen =

Public university in Bergen, Norway

- Universitetet i Bergen
- Emblem
- Latin: Universitas Bergensis
- Type: Public University
- Established: 1946; 80 years ago, 1825; 201 years ago
- Affiliations: ARQUS Alliance; EUA; Coimbra Group; Utrecht Network
- Rector: Margareth Hagen
- Administrative staff: 4,215 (2021)
- Students: 19,641 (2021)
- Location: Bergen, Norway; 60°23′17.11″N 5°19′22.34″E
- Campus: Urban
- Colors
- Website: uib.no

The University of Bergen (Norwegian: Universitetet i Bergen) is a public research university in Bergen, Norway. As of 2021, the university had over 4,000 employees and 19,000 students. It was established by an act of parliament in 1946 consolidating several scientific institutions that dated as far back as 1825. It is Norway's second-oldest university, and is considered to be one of the nation's four so-called "established universities." It has faculties and programmes in all the academic fields typical of a classical university, as well as such degree programmes as medicine and law that, traditionally, only the "established universities" are authorized by law to offer. It is also one of Norway's leading universities in many of the natural sciences, including marine research and climate research. It has consistently been ranked in the top 200 or top one percent of universities in the world, and as one of the best 10 or best 50 universities worldwide in some fields, such as earth and marine sciences. It is part of the Coimbra Group and of the U5 group of Norway's oldest and highest-ranked universities.

== History ==
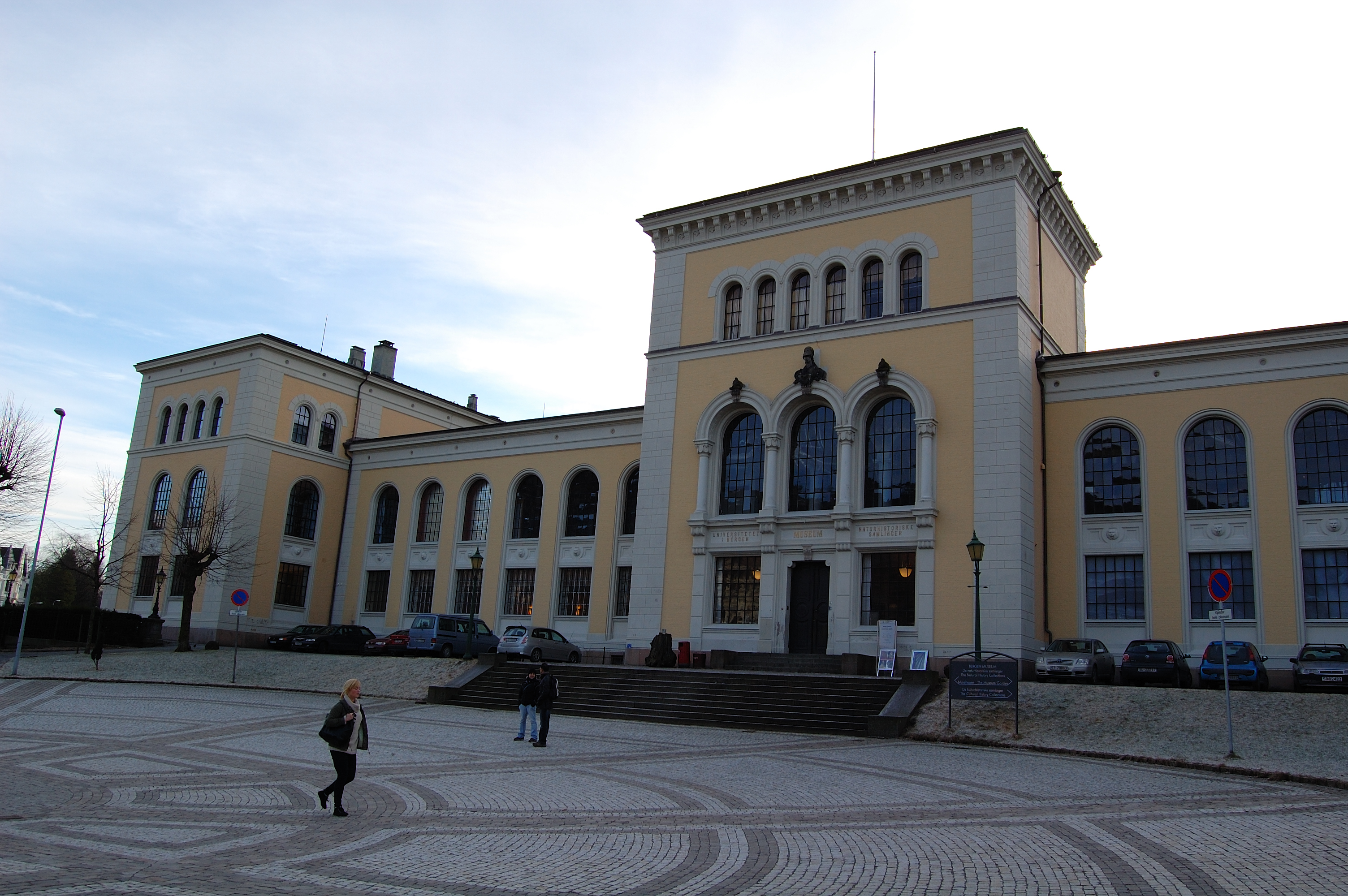
University Museum of Bergen

The university traces its roots to several earlier scientific and scholarly institutions founded in Bergen. Academic activity had taken place in Bergen since the founding of Bergen Cathedral School in 1153, the Seminarium Fredericianum in 1750 and the establishment of the Royal Norwegian Naval Academy in 1817. Academia and higher education would also be significantly advanced in the city with the establishment of Bergen Museum, later renamed University Museum of Bergen, in 1825. Founded by Wilhelm Frimann Christie and Jacob Neumann, the museum became a venue for both research and education specialized on natural science, and featured prominent researcher like Michael Sars, Daniel Cornelius Danielssen and Fridtjof Nansen.

Bergen eventually became a city with several arenas for higher education and research with the Geophysical Institute being established in 1917, the Chr. Michelsen Institute in 1930, the Norwegian School of Economics in 1936 and finally the university in 1946. The University of Bergen was established by an act of parliament in 1946, as Norway's second university.

=== Rector elections ===
==== 2021 ====
Party	Votes	%
Team Hagen	2,705	62.30
Team Samdal	1,637	37.70
Total	4,342	100.00
Valid votes	4,342	95.14
Invalid/blank votes	222	4.86
Total votes	4,564	100.00
Registered voters/turnout	22,943	19.89

== Organization ==
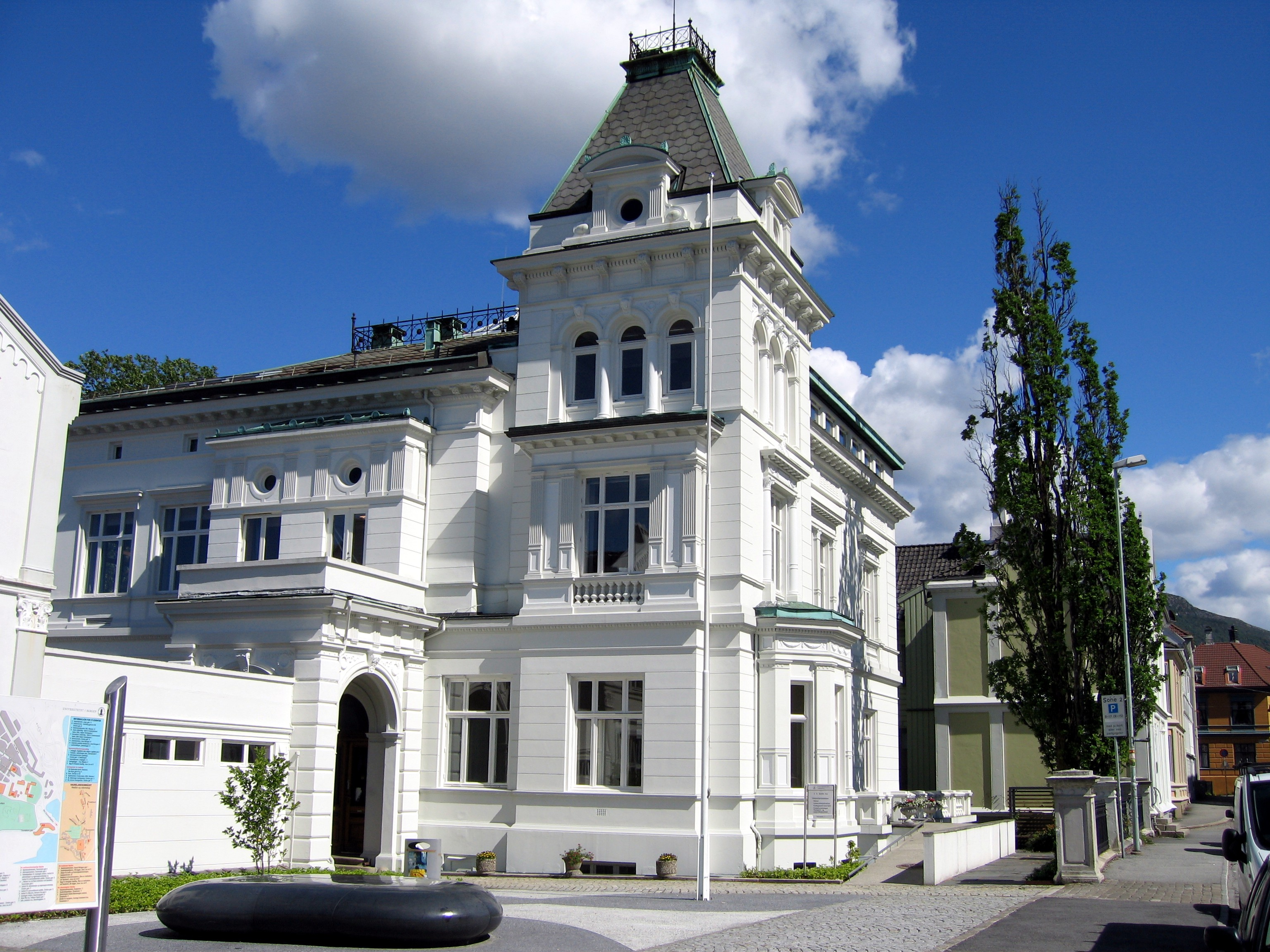
Office of the Rector of the University of Bergen

The University of Bergen has an elected rector. The current rector is Margareth Hagen, who was elected for a four-year term starting 1 August 2021 after serving as interim rector.

The university has 7 faculties, the newest being The Faculty of Fine Art, Music and Design which was established in 2017. The University of Bergen Library and the University Museum of Bergen have a faculty-like status. Most of the university campus and administration is located in the Nygård neighbourhood, which has resulted in the campus area often being referred to as Nygårdshøyden or simply Høyden, meaning "the hill".

== International relations ==
The university is an active member of the University of the Arctic. UArctic is an international cooperative network based in the Circumpolar Arctic region, consisting of more than 200 universities, colleges, and other organizations with an interest in promoting education and research in the Arctic region.

The university also participates in UArctic's mobility program north2north. The aim of that program is to enable students of member institutions to study in different parts of the North.

== Academics ==
The University of Bergen has three strategic areas:

- Marine research
- Climate and energy transition
- Global challenges

=== Ranking ===
University rankings

Global – Overall
- ARWU World: 201–300 (2024)
- QS World: =287 (2026)
- THE World: 251–300 (2025)
- USNWR Global: 259 (2025)

In 2010 the university was ranked as number 135 worldwide by the Times Higher Education World University Rankings, and 181st worldwide by the 2015/16 QS World University Rankings. UiB was also ranked number 148 worldwide in the July 2010 Webometrics Ranking of World Universities. The URAP (University Ranking by Academic Performance) has ranked UiB for 2014/2015 as the 219th worldwide.

=== Tuition ===
The University of Bergen, in common with other Norwegian universities, does not charge tuition fees, except for students coming from outside the EU. Students are however required to be members of the student organisation Sammen Bergen to cover the welfare expenses. As of August 2026, this fee (semesteravgift) is 600 kr (approx. USD 64$) per semester, this provides access to several services, including cultural activities, childcare, refunds for many medical expenses and subsidized accommodation.

Additionally there is added an optional 50 kr donation which goes to the SAIH, a student charity organization.

== Faculties ==
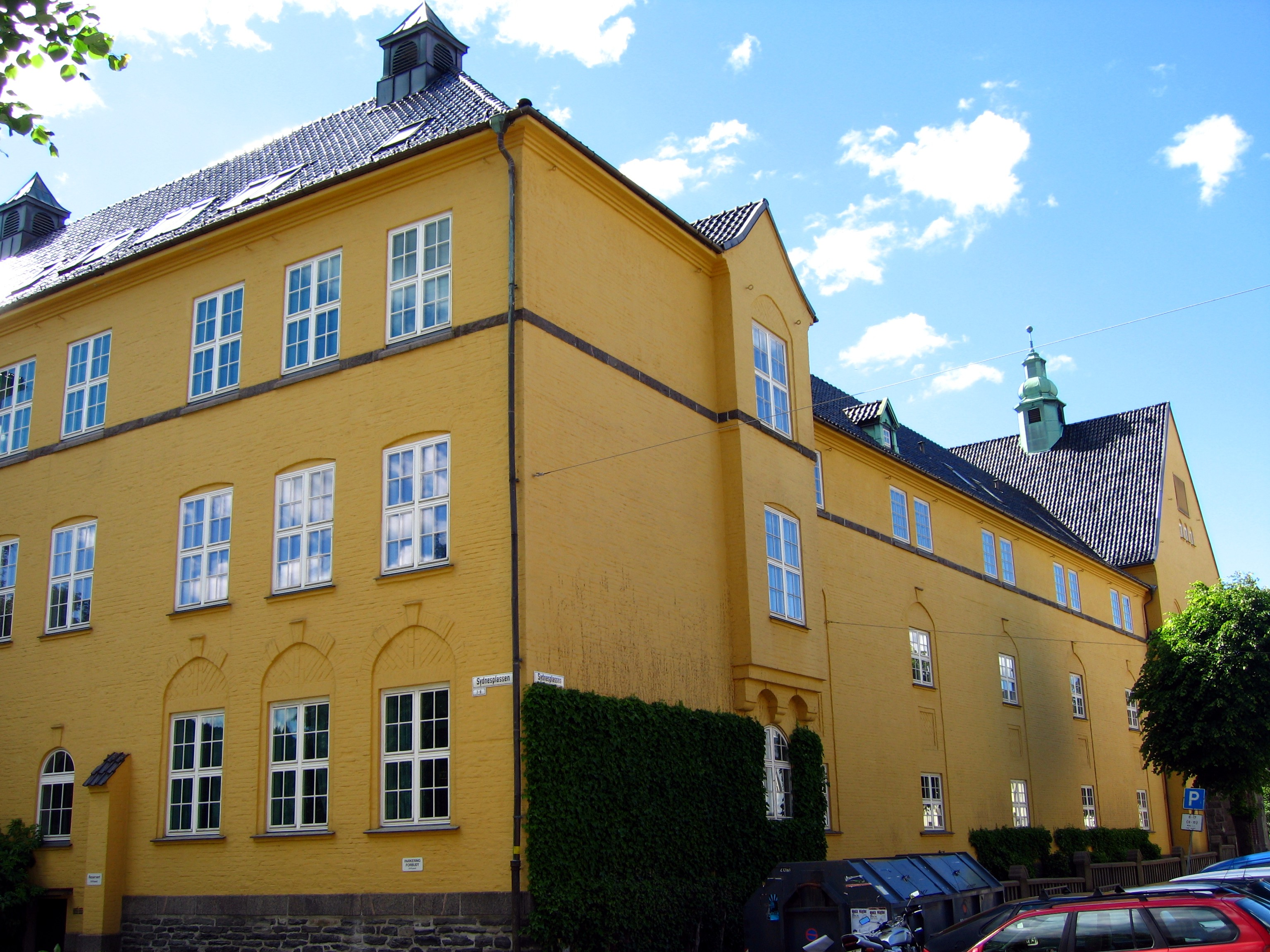
Sydneshaugen skole, campus of the Faculty of Humanities

=== Faculty of Fine Art, Music and Design ===
The Faculty of Fine Art, Music and Design was established on 1 January 2017. It is composed of the earlier Grieg Academy – Department of Music, and the Bergen Academy of Art and Design.

- The Art Academy – Department of Contemporary Art
- The Grieg Academy - Department of Music
- Department of Design

=== Faculty of Humanities ===
- Centre for the Study of the Sciences and the Humanities
- Centre for Women and Gender Research
- Department of Archeology, History, Cultural Studies and Religion (AHKR)
- Department of Foreign Languages (Arabic, English, French, Italian, Japanese, Russian, Spanish, German and single courses in Chinese (IF))
- Department of Linguistics, Literary and Aesthetical studies (LLE) (Nordic, Comparative Literature, Theatre Studies, Digital Culture, Linguistics, Art History, Classics)
- Department of Philosophy and First Semester Studies (see Examen philosophicum and Examen facultatum) (FOF)

Two Norwegian Centres of Research Excellence are hosted at the Faculty of Humanities:

- Centre for Early Sapiens Behaviour (SapienCE)
- Center for Digital Narrative (CDN)

The faculty revised its structure and names in August 2007.

=== Faculty of Law ===
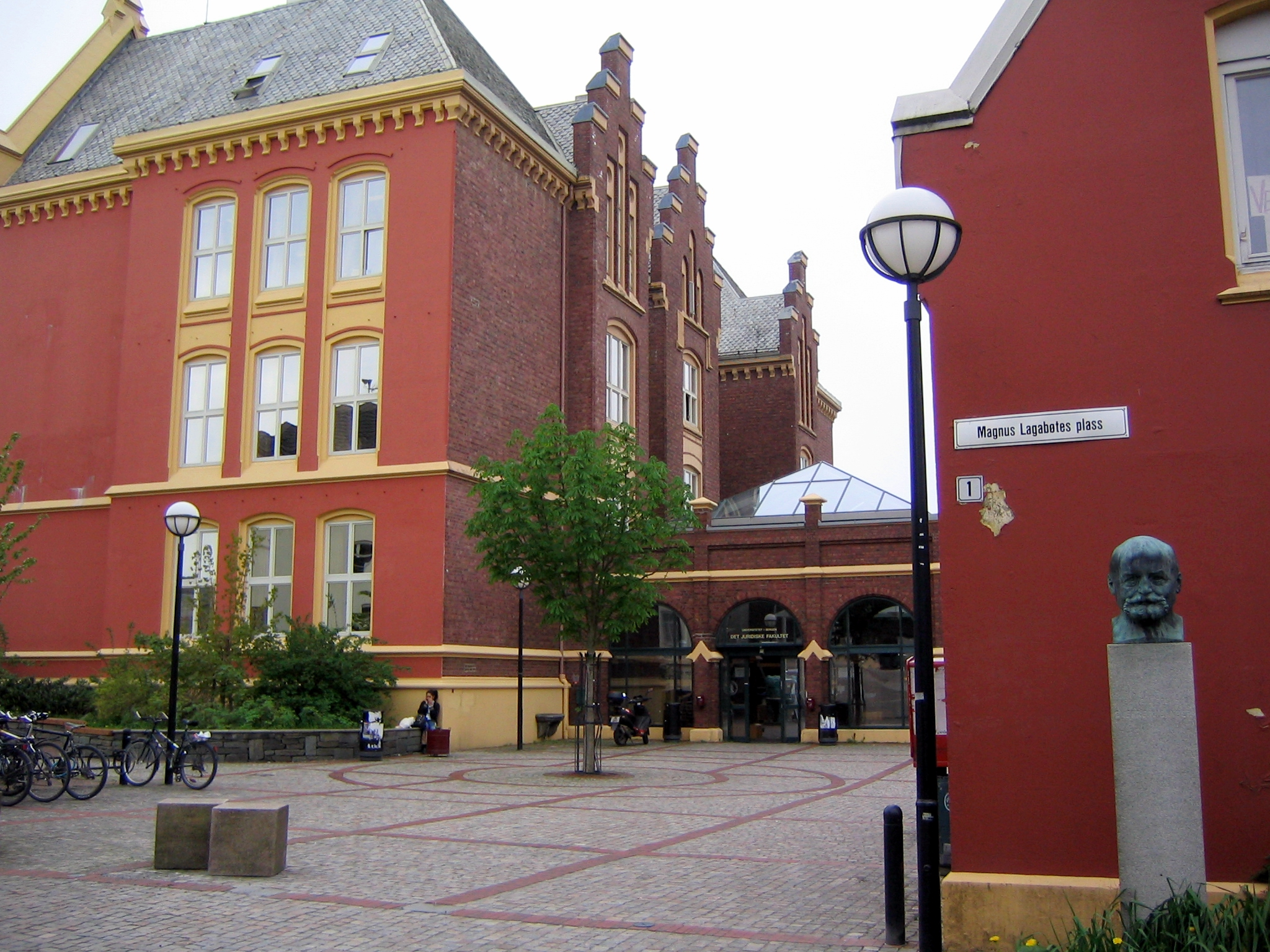
The Faculty of Law at the University of Bergen, seen from Magnus Lagabøtes plass.

The Faculty of Law was established as a separate faculty in 1980, with legal studies and research having been conducted at the university since 1969. The faculty is one of three Norwegian institutions which offer legal studies, the other two being the law faculties at the University of Oslo and the University of Tromsø. The faculty offers a five-year programme leading to a Master's degree in law and a three-year PhD programme, and currently has approximately 1900 students.

=== Faculty of Mathematics and Natural Sciences ===
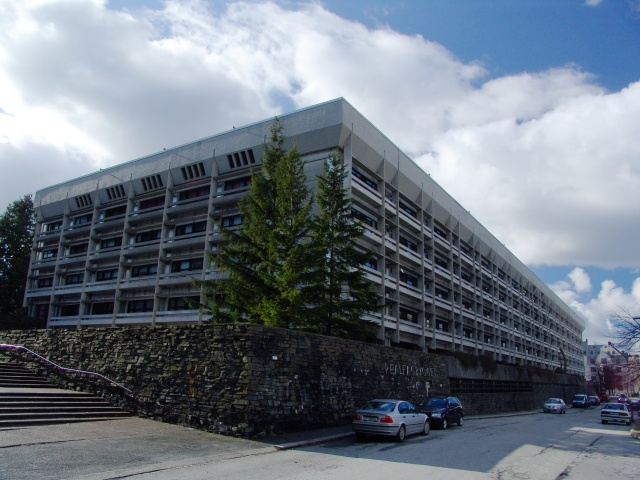
The Natural Science Building

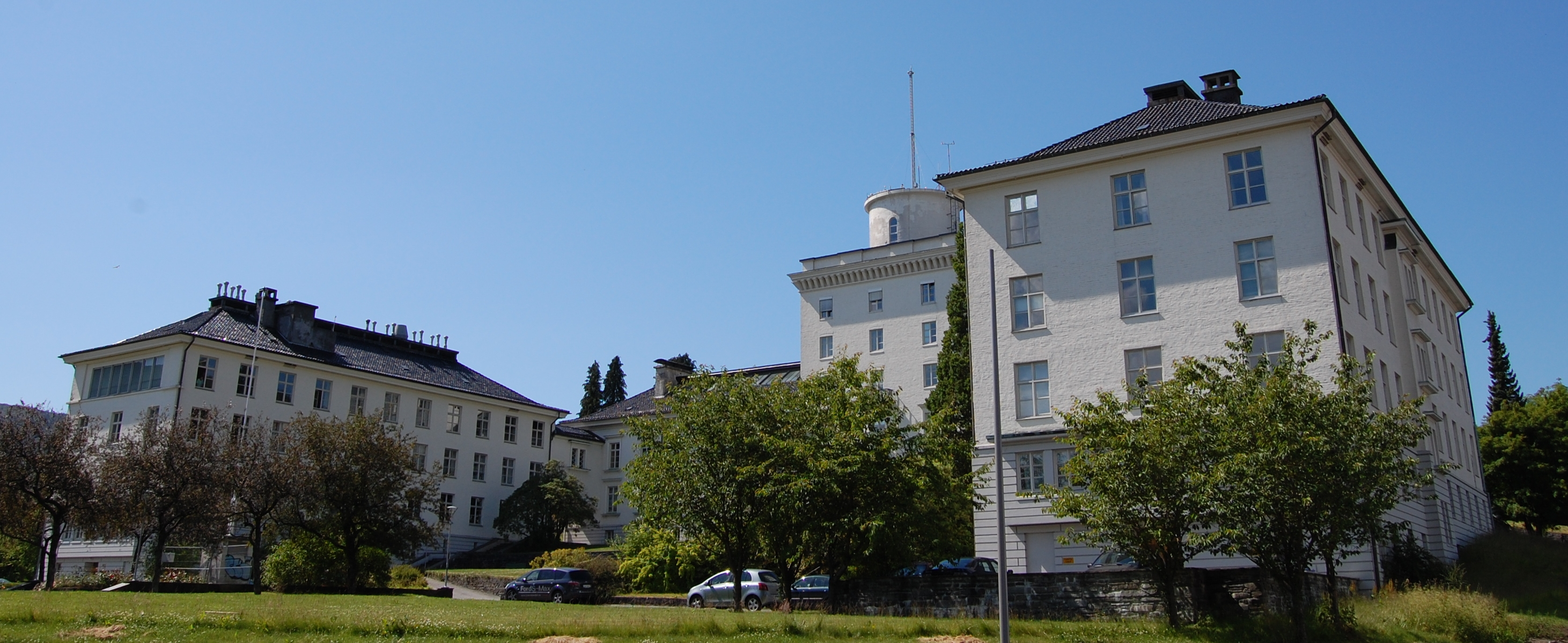
The Geophysical Institute

As of 1 January 2023 the faculty is organised into the following seven departments:

- Department of Biological Sciences
- Department of Chemistry
- Department of Earth Science
- Department of Informatics
- Department of Mathematics
- Department of Physics and Technology
- Geophysical Institute
- Michael Sars Centre

The Faculty is tied to a number of centres:

Centres of Excellence in Research:

- Bergen Centre for Ethics and Priority Setting (BCEPS)

Centres of Research-based Innovation:

- Climate Futures
- Smart Ocean
- Sea Lice Research Centre

Centres of Excellence in Education:

- BioCEED

Other important units and centres:

- Sars International Centre for Marine Molecular Biology
- K.G. Jebsen Centre for Deep Sea Research
- Bjerknes Centre for Climate Research
- CBU - Computational Biology Unit
- Norwegian Ocean Observation Laboratory
- Centre for Sustainable Aquaculture Innovations (CSAI)
- Bergen Offshore Wind Centre (BOW)

=== Faculty of Medicine ===
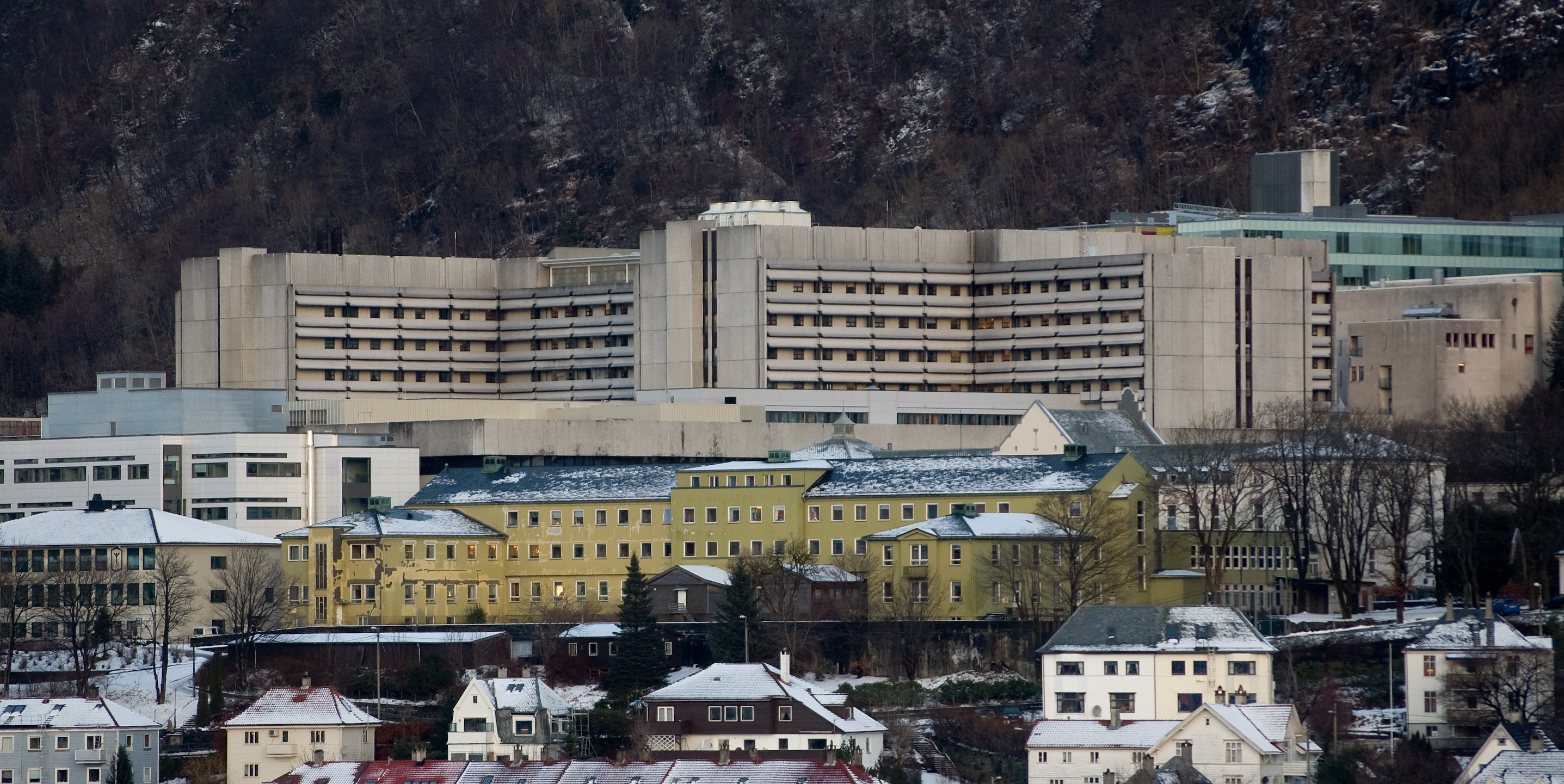
Haukeland University Hospital

Since January 2013 the faculty is organised in the following departments and units:

- Department of Biomedicine
- Department of Clinical Medicine
- Department of Clinical Science
- Department of Clinical Dentistry
- Department of Global Public Health and Primary Care
- Centre for International Health
- Laboratory Animal Facility

=== Faculty of Psychology ===
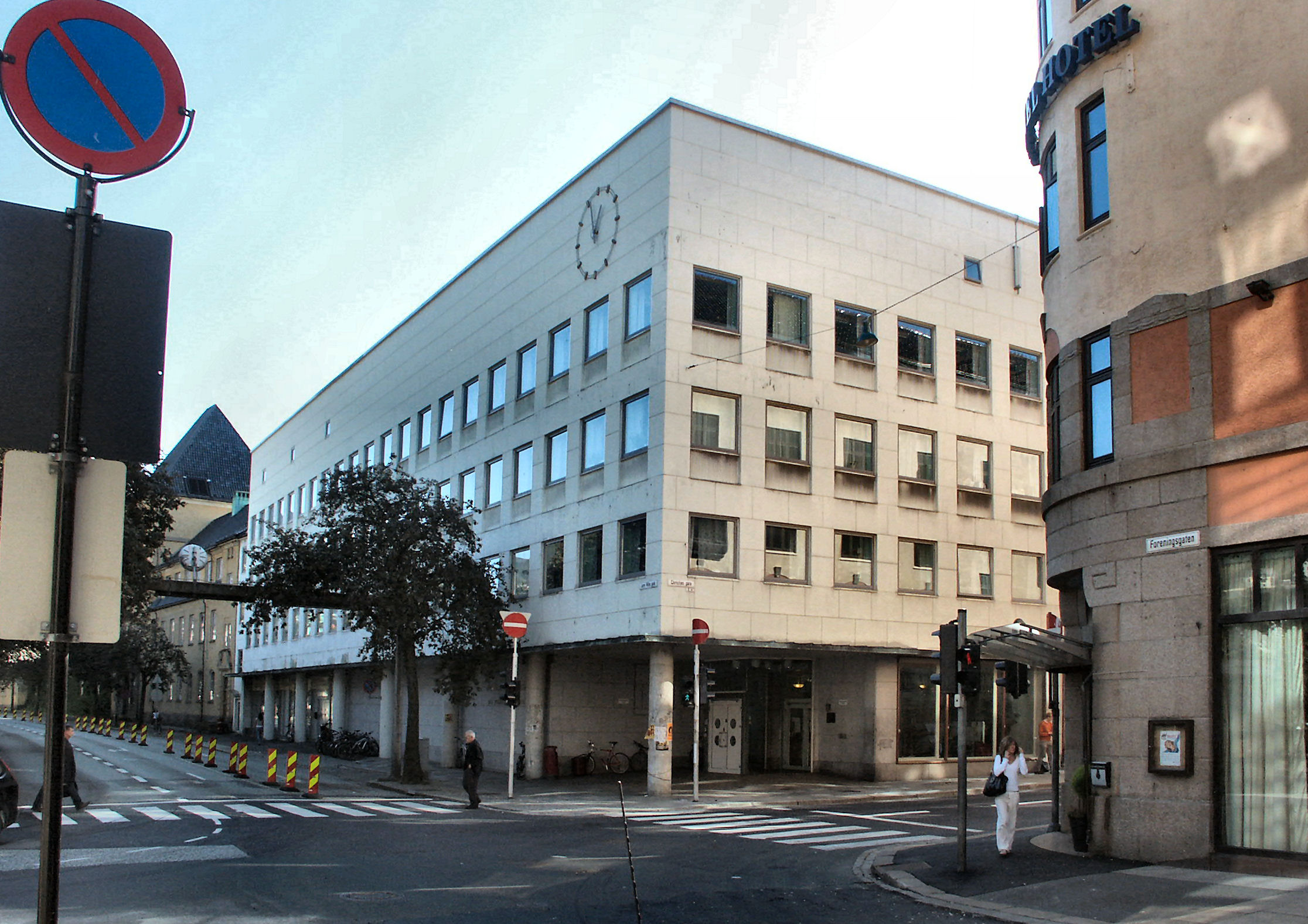
The Faculty of Psychology

The University of Bergen is the only institution in the Nordic countries where the study of psychology has been assigned to its own faculty. Established in 1980, it educates psychologists and is responsible for the university's pedagogic education.

- Department of Psychosocial Science
- Department of Health Promotion and Development
- Department of Education
- Department of Clinical Psychology
- Department of Biological and Medical Psychology
- Centre for Crisis Psychology
- SLATE: Centre for the Science of Learning & Technology
- Norwegian Competence Center for Gambling and Gaming Research

=== Faculty of Social Sciences ===
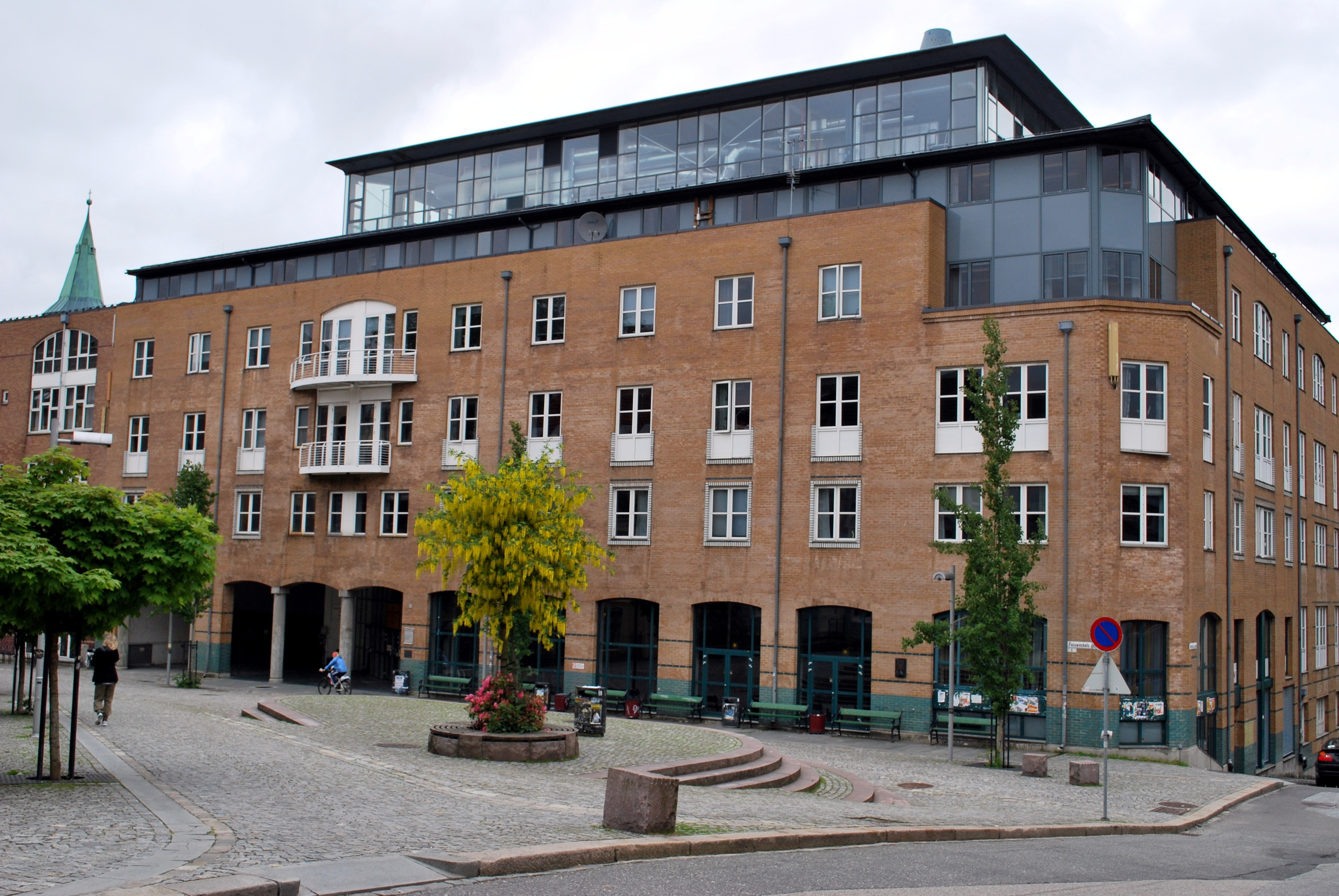
The Faculty of Social Sciences

- Department of Administration and Organization Theory
- Department of Comparative Politics
- Department of Economics
- Department of Geography
- Department of Information Science and Media Studies
- Department of Social Anthropology
- Department of Sociology
- Centre for Development Studies
- Centre for Gender Studies
- Centre for Middle Eastern and Islamic Studies

== Notable people ==
=== Alumni ===
- Knut Olav Åmås, writer, editor, and politician
- Leif Ove Andsnes, pianist and chamber musician
- Jon Fosse, author and dramatist, Nobel laureate in Literature (2023)
- Lars Gule, philosopher and social commentator
- Mukhisa Kituyi, Secretary-General UNCTAD
- Karl Ove Knausgård, author
- Tom Mollnes, immunologist and academic
- Torbjørn Mork, Director of the Norwegian Board of Health Supervision
- Monica Mæland, Norwegian Minister of Trade and Industry
- Freda Nkirote, Director of the British Institute in Eastern Africa (BIEA) and President of the Pan-African Archaeological Association
- Iselin Nybø, Norwegian Minister of Trade and Industry
- Bernt Østhus (born 1970), lawyer, investor, photographer
- Sveinung Rotevatn, Norwegian Minister of Climate and the Environment
- Lars Henrik Smedsrud, Norwegian polar oceanographer and an academic
- Erna Solberg, Prime Minister of Norway
- Hans-Wilhelm Steinfeld, journalist and writer
- Grethe Fatima Syéd, literary scholar, translator, and author
- Blandina Theophil Mmbaga, pediatrician, professor, and lecturer

=== Faculty ===
- Frank Aarebrot, comparative politics
- Fredrik Barth, social anthropology
- Jan Fridthjof Bernt, law
- Margunn Bjørnholt, sociology
- Julia Brannen, sociology
- Tom Colbjørnsen, sociology
- Michael Fellows, computer science
- Per Fugelli, medicine
- Knut Fægri, botany
- Gabriel Gustafson, archeology
- Pinar Heggernes, computer science
- Gudmund Hernes, sociology
- Helga Hernes, sociology and political science
- Georg Johannesen, rhetoric
- Stein Kuhnle, sociology and political science
- Johan Olsen, political science
- Stein Rokkan, sociology and political science
- Gunnar Skirbekk, philosophy
- Harald Sverdrup, oceanographer and meteorologist
- Sigve Tjøtta, mathematics

== Other notes ==
The university also has an Arboretum and Botanical Garden.
