= Oslo Business School =

Graduate school of Oslo Metropolitan University, Norway

Coordinates: 59°55′10″N 10°44′07″E

- Established: 2015
- Academic staff: 62 (DBH, 2019)
- Students: 1715 (DBH, 2019)
- Location: Oslo, Norway
- Website: Official website

Oslo Business School (Handelshøyskolen) is the graduate business school of Oslo Metropolitan University. Located in Oslo, Norway, the school offers study programs at both Bachelor and Master level, as well as a wide range of continuing and further education, in business administration, finance and management.

== History ==
In 1875 Oslo Commerce School (Oslo Handelsgymnasium) was established, making it the first school to offer a business education in Norway. In response to societal and industrial developments in Norway during the 1950s and 1960s, the school expanded its business education to college level, and in 1970 Oslo College of Business and Economics (Økonomisk College) was established. From 1977 the college offered a three-year program with specialization in accounting and auditing, and as of 1987 the college offered a three-year program with specialization in International Business.

In 1994, Oslo College of Business and Economics was moved to the newly-formed Oslo University College (HiO), and changed its name to Økonomiutdanningen. The name was later changed to Institutt for økonomi og administrasjon. In 2011 HiO merged with Akershus University College (HiAK) and formed Oslo and Akershus University College (HiOA). In the fall of 2012 the business school launched its first MBA (Master of Business Administration) program. In 2015 the school's name was changed yet again, this time to its current name of Handelshøyskolen (Oslo Business School). In 2018 HiOA became a state university and was renamed Oslo Metropolitan University.

== Research and development ==
As of May 2020 researchers at Oslo Business School take part in the following research groups:

- Digital Innovation and Strategic Competence in Organizations (DISCO)
- Economics and Finance
- Organization and Management in the Public Sector
- Professions and Management
- Organizational Psychology (ORGPSYCH)

All publications are listed at CRIStin (Current Research Information System in Norway).

== Renowned faculty members ==
- Jan Grund, Master of Economics and Professor of Health Administration.
- Karl Joachim Breunig, Professor of Strategic Management.
- Øystein Strøm, Professor of Business Administration.
- Aagoth Storvik, Doctor of Science and Professor.
- Beate Elstad, Doctor of Economics and associate professor.
- Erik Døving, Doctor of Economics and associate professor.

== Faculty Directors ==
- Trine Ellekjær, 2000 to present.
- Gunnar Engelsåstrø, 1994 – 2000 (and 2012/2013)
- Kristian K. Saxegaard 1970 – 1994
