= Nuclear power in Norway =

No nuclear power plant has ever been established in Norway; however, the country has a legal framework for licensing the construction and operation of nuclear installations. Also, four research reactors have been built in Norway. The four reactors were located in Kjeller and Halden and were as follows:

- Kjeller reactors at Institute for Energy Technology
  - NORA (activated 1961, shut down 1967)
  - JEEP I (activated 1951, shut down 1967)
  - JEEP II (activated 1966, shut down 2018)
- Halden reactor
  - HBWR - Halden Boiling Water Reactor (activated 1958, shut down 2018)

In 2019, Norway's last remaining nuclear reactor left in operation, the JEEP II reactor at Kjeller, was shut down after more than 50 years of service. In 2021, the Norwegian Green Party stated their support for development of nuclear energy as an alternative source of energy in order to reach the IPCC's goal of preventing global warming by 1.5 degrees.

In 2020 it was estimated dismantling the Halden and Kjeller research reactors and restoring the sites to unrestricted use will cost about NOK20 billion (US$2 billion) and take 20 to 25 years.

There has been discussions about the possible usage of nuclear energy, which is supported by some industry leaders. Statkraft together with Vattenfall, Fortum and the energy investment company Scatec announced plans to investigate building of a thorium-fueled power plant in 2007 which was never realized. In 2010, Aker Solutions purchased patents from Nobel Prize winning physicist Carlo Rubbia for the design of a proton accelerator-based thorium nuclear power plant, but was subsequently sold to Jacobs Engineering Group in 2011. In late 2012, Norway's privately owned Thor Energy, in collaboration with the government and Westinghouse, announced a four-year trial using thorium in an existing nuclear reactor.

== Decommission ==
Norway is advancing plans to decommission its nuclear research facilities at Kjeller through the proposed transfer of responsibility from the Institute for Energy Technology (IFE) to Norwegian Nuclear Decommissioning (NND). In October 2026, NND applied for a license to take over the site, potentially from 1 January 2027, subject to regulatory approval. The facilities include the JEEP I and JEEP II research reactors, alongside spent fuel storage and radioactive waste facilities.

== See also ==
- Institute for Energy Technology
- Norwegian Nuclear Commission
