= SIFO =

SIFO may refer to:

- Sifo, a Swedish company in the area of opinion and social research
- National Institute for Consumer Research (SIFO), a consumer affairs research institute based in Oslo, Norway
- Sifo Company of St. Paul, Minnesota, a defunct maker of children's toys
- Small intestinal fungal overgrowth, a condition similar in symptoms to small intestinal bacterial overgrowth
