= Sifo (disambiguation) =

Sifo may refer to:

- Kantar Sifo, a Swedish company operating in the field of opinion and social research.
- Liu Shifu (劉師復), Chinese anarchist who wrote in Esperanto under the pseudonym Sifo.
- Sifo Company, a former American toy manufacturer.
- Small Intestine Fungus Overgrowth
