= Nordic Labour Journal =

- Language: English and Scandinavian
- Edited by: Line Scheistrøen

Publication details
- History: 1996–present
- Publisher: Work Research Institute and Oslo and Akershus University College (Norway)

Standard abbreviations
- ISO 4: Nord. Labour J.

Indexing
- ISSN: 1398-3458
- LCCN: 2001207118
- OCLC no.: 940758366

Links
- Journal homepage; Online archive

Nordic Labour Journal is an online magazine published by the Norwegian Work Research Institute in Oslo on commission from the Nordic Council of Ministers. The magazine was launched in 1996. The main focus is the labour market, work environments and labour law within the Nordic models, which are based on collective agreements between unions and employers in cooperation with the authorities.

The editor-in-chief is Line Scheistrøen.

The magazine has a Scandinavian version, called Arbeidsliv i Norden, which was established in 2000.
