= Akershus (disambiguation) =

Akershus is a county (fylke) in Norway.

Akershus may also refer to:

== Places ==
=== Norway ===
- Akershus (Storting constituency), in the county of Viken
- Akershus County Municipality, the regional governing administration of Akershus county
- Akershus Fortress, a fortress and castle in downtown Oslo, Norway
- Akershus University College, a former university college in Kjeller, Akershus county, now merged with Oslo University College to create:
  - Oslo and Akershus University College, in the city centre of Oslo
- Akershus University Hospital (Ahus), a Norwegian public university hospital in Lørenskog municipality, Akershus county

=== Other places ===
- Akershus Royal Banquet Hall and Restaurant Akershus at the Norway Pavilion at Epcot, Walt Disney World Resort, Florida
- Åkershus, Staffanstorp, an area of rental apartments in Staffanstorp Municipality, Skåne County, Sweden

== Business organizations ==
- Akershus Amtstidende, a local newspaper published in Drøbak, Norway
- Akershus Energi, a Norwegian power company that produces hydroelectricity
- Akershus Kollektivterminaler FKF, a county agency responsible for major bus terminals in Akershus county
