= Knut Seip =

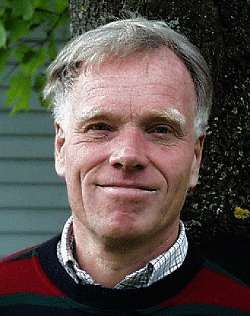

Knut Lehre Seip (born 13 April 1942 in Oslo, Norway) is professor in environmental management at Oslo Metropolitan University, Norway. Seip obtained his masters in physics at the University of Oslo, UiO, in 1969. He obtained his ph.D (doctor philos.) at UiO in 1992 with the thesis “Mathematical models of lake ecosystems.” Seip has served at several positions at Center for industrial research, SI / SINTEF. Professor Seip held the first chair in Environmental management in Norway, at Telemark University College 1994-2000, then he became professor and head of Research and Management at Oslo University College. From 2011 he has been professor and vice dean for research and development at the Faculty of technology, arts and design at Oslo and Akershus University College of applied Sciences. He is the son of the Norwegian historian Jens Arup Seip.

== Scientific focus ==
Seip has worked in applied mathematics with problems related to doubly curved surfaces, within the ecological field with models of rocky shore and lake ecosystems (e.g.,;), with oil pollution, and with population cycles in terrestrial environments. Within macroeconomic field he has worked on leading and lagging indexes and breakpoint identification. He has developed two methods for studying interactions between actors, the “leading –lagging, LL- strength method” and the “angle frequency method”. The first extends the analysis of associations with analyses of “leading” and “lagging” relationships for cyclic phenomena. The other extends the analysis of slopes in regression analysis with the analysis of “compass directions”. Both methods are used to characterize the behavior of actors, for example as competitors, facilitators and gainers or engineers. The methods are used within ecology and economy. In economy the method is furthermore used to identify leading indexes that forecasts future developments in the economy to secure that information used by an economic actor is available before it is used and to identify which economic actor listen to whom, when they do it, and why. In global warming studies the LL- method is used to examine when carbon dioxide changes comes before global temperature changes and to study teleconnections between ocean oscillations.

== Books ==
Seip has written two books with coauthor Fred Wenstøp.

- Seip, K.L. and F. Wenstøp: A primer on environmental decision-making. An integrative quantitative approach (2006) Springer Verlag. ISBN 1-4020-4073-3
- Wenstøp, F. and K.L. Seip: Verdier og valg - verdibasert beslutningsanalyse i praksis (2009) Universitetsforlaget. ISBN 978-82-15-01410-4
