= Sally Wheeler (legal scholar) =

Professor and Head of the School of Law at Queen's University Belfast

Sally Wheeler OBE MRIA FAcSS FAAL
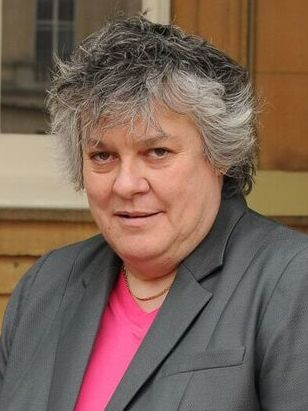
- Wheeler in 2017

Vice-Chancellor of Birkbeck, University of London
- Incumbent
- Assumed office 1 January 2024
- Chancellor: Anne, Princess Royal
- Preceded by: David Latchman

Personal details
- Born: 23 July 1964 (age 62)
- Education: Lady Margaret Hall, Oxford (BA); Pembroke College, Oxford (MA, DPhil)

Sally Wheeler, OBE MRIA FAcSS FAAL (born 23 July 1964) is Vice-Chancellor of Birkbeck, University of London and was previously Deputy Vice-Chancellor (International and Corporate) at the Australian National University, where she was also served as Deputy Vice-Chancellor (International Strategy) and Dean of the College of Law (2018-2022). She is also a Visiting Full Professor at the UCD Sutherland School of law and adjunct professor at Waikato University, New Zealand, and Jilin University, China. Wheeler was elected to the Academy of Social Sciences and the Royal Irish Academy in 2011 and 2013, respectively. She was previously a professor at Queen's University Belfast and was the Head of the School of Law at Queen's University Belfast for several years, she also served as Interim Dean of the Faculty of Arts Humanities and Social Sciences (AHSS), Dean of Internationalisation (AHSS) and, in 2017, Interim Pro-Vice Chancellor for Research Enterprise. Wheeler is the author or co-author of several books on corporate governance, over 70 articles or book chapters, and she has edited or co-edited nine other books. Wheeler has given major addresses and led workshops around the world, and has also been cited as "one of the world's leading experts" on the governance of pensions. Her appointment as the incoming Vice-Chancellor of Birkbeck, University of London was announced in August 2023.

== Early life ==
The elder daughter of Patrick Wheeler and Joan Twells, Sally Wheeler was born in Worcestershire and educated at the Alice Ottley School, Worcester, and the Abbey High School, Redditch. She read Law (Jurisprudence) at Lady Margaret Hall, Oxford, and received a Doctorate of Philosophy from Pembroke College and the Oxford Centre for Socio-Legal Studies.

== Career ==
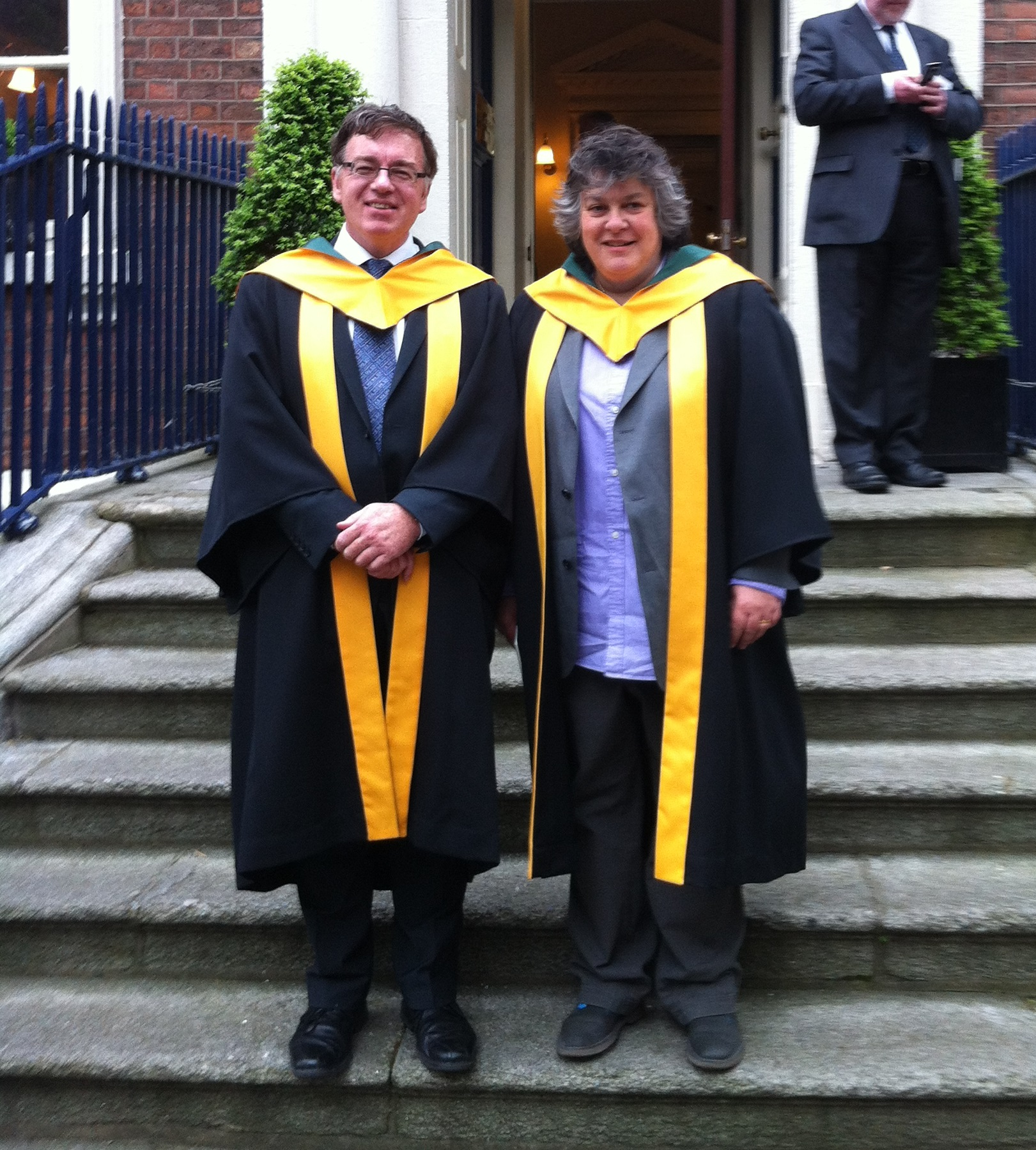
Sally Wheeler (right) at her investiture into the Royal Irish Academy in 2013

At present, Wheeler is Vice-Chancellor of Birkbeck, University of London. Previously she was iDeputy Vice-Chancellor (International and Corporate) at the Australian National University. She joined ANU in 2018 as Dean of the College of Law and, whilst in this role, also served as Deputy Vice-Chancellor for International Strategy. Prior to joining ANU she held a Chair in Corporate Law at Queen's University Belfast where she was also the Interim Pro-Vice Chancellor for Research and Enterprise. Whilst at Queen's Wheeler also served as the Faculty Dean for Internationalisation (AHSS), as the Interim Faculty Dean (AHSS), as Head of the School of Arts, English and Languages and, for five years, as the Head of the School of Law. Prior to taking this position, she worked at the University of Nottingham, Brunel, Keele, University of Manchester, Birkbeck and the University of Leeds (where she was appointed to her first chair in 1994 at the age of 29). She has acted as external examiner at more than thirteen universities across the United Kingdom and Ireland and has examined numerous Ph.D theses. She was elected to the Academy of Social Sciences in 2011 and the Royal Irish Academy in 2013. Wheeler has also held the position of adjunct professor at the University of Waikato, since 2013, and the position of Visiting Professor at Jilin University, China since 2015.

During her time at Queens University Belfast, Wheeler served as editor of the Northern Ireland Legal Quarterly (NILQ). She is on the advisory board of The Journal of Law and Society, and the editorial boards of Law and Critique, Insolvency Law and Practice, Law in Context, Griffith Law Review, and the Asian Journal of Law and Society. As of 2016, Wheeler is Vice Chair and Treasurer of the Committee of Heads of University Law Schools (CHULS), and in 2017 will become its Chair. Between 1995 and 1999, and 2002 and 2011, she was the Chair of the Socio-Legal Studies Association (SLSA).

Wheeler is the author of Reservation of Title Clauses and Corporations and the Third Way, and the co-author of Directors' Liabilities in the Context of Corporate Groups, Disqualification of Directors and Contract Law: Cases, Materials, and Commentary. She has edited or co-edited nine other books. She co-edits the Socio-Legal and Corporate and Financial Law series published by Palgrave Macmillan. Wheeler has published over 70 articles and book chapters, most of them single-authored. She has given plenary addresses at the annual conferences of both of the UK's major subject associations for Law, the Socio-Legal Studies Association (SLSA) and the Society of Legal Scholars (SLS). She has given presentations at many UK institutions and at universities around the world, including the Edmond J. Safra Center for Ethics at Harvard University, the University of New South Wales, the University of Waikato, the Victoria University of Wellington, Dalhousie University, the Oslo Business School and the University of Michigan.

In 2013, Wheeler visited Australia to lead a series of workshops give talks discussing independence and accountability in superannuation. In these talks—which were supported by Herbert Smith Freehills, the Association of Superannuation Funds of Australia, and the Centre for Law Markets and Regulation—Wheeler argued that the trend for mandating a structural independence on the boards of listed companies had led to confusion, that this independence actually worked against the fostering of trust and respect between individuals who did not have "shared norms and values". Instead, in such structures independence of thought is supplanted by the less desirable independence of identity. In 2014, Australian news website The New Daily cited Wheeler as "one of the world's leading experts on superannuation governance".

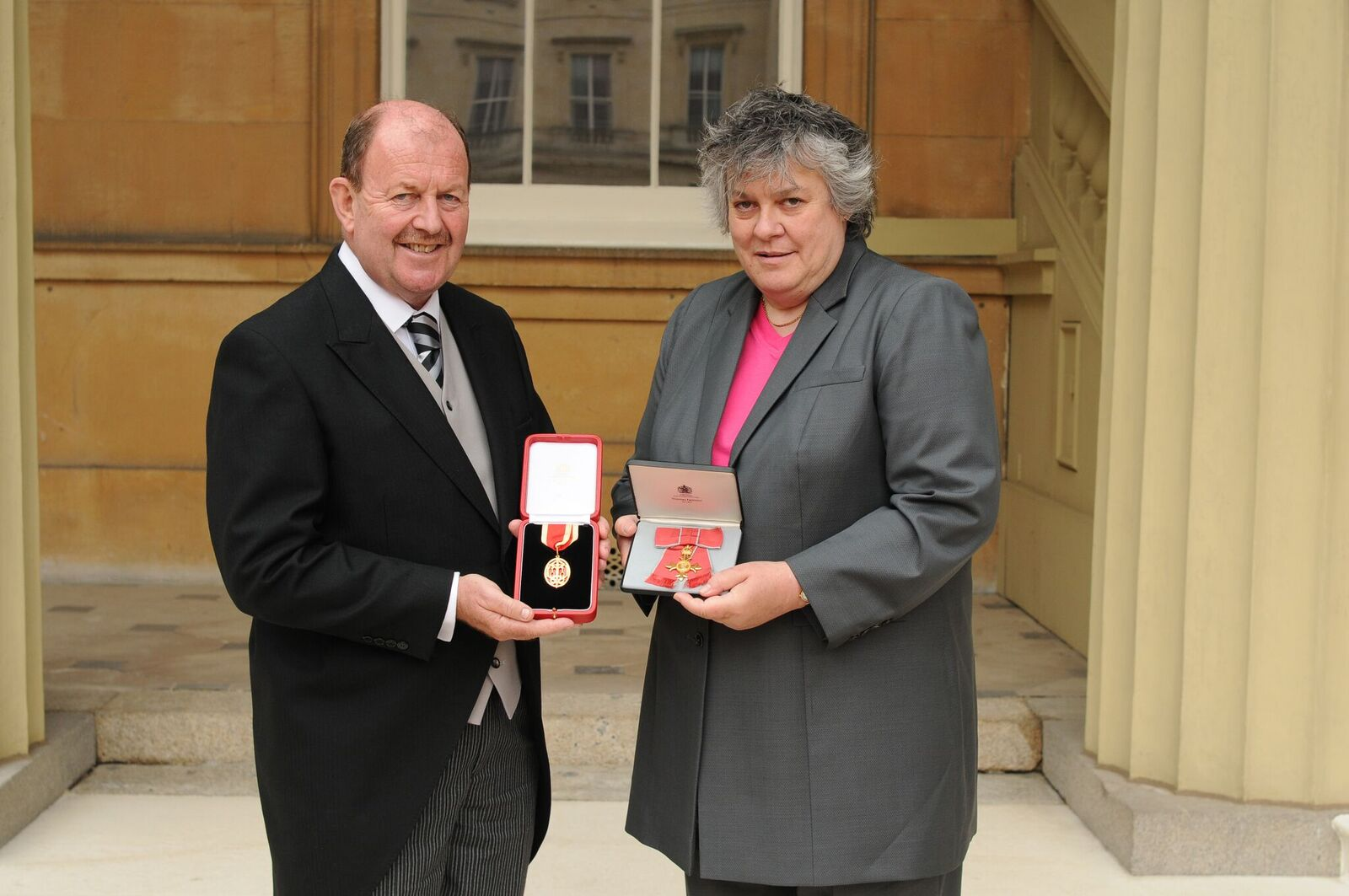
Sally Wheeler (right) with Sir John McCanny at their OBE/Knighthood investitures on 16 June 2017

Wheeler was a member of the Law Panel for the 2001 and 2008 Research Assessment Exercise (RAE) and participated in the Romanian RAE in 2011. She has reviewed research for Law Schools at more than ten UK universities and contributed to strategic reviews at both UK and non-UK universities. Wheeler has also served as a member of the Economic and Social Research Council's (ESRC) Grants Board, the Postgraduate Training Recognition Panel, the Postdoctoral Fellowships Assessment Panel, and Seminar Competition Panel. She currently serves on assessment panels for the Irish Research Council and on various Royal Irish Academy committees. In 2014, she received a Prize for Contributions to the Socio-Legal Community from the Socio-Legal Studies Association.

On her appointment in June 2013, Wheeler became the first lay member to join Northern Ireland's Lord Chief Justice's sentencing group. She also served as a governor of Corpus Christi College, Belfast.

Wheeler was appointed Officer of the Order of the British Empire (OBE) in the 2017 New Year Honours for services to higher education in Northern Ireland. On 16 March 2017 Wheeler was elected to the position of Senior Vice-president of the Royal Irish Academy. She was elected a Fellow of the Australian Academy of Law in Dec 2018.

== Notable works ==
Books as sole author

- Reservation of Title Clauses: Impact and Implications (1991), Oxford University Press, 230pp + appendices. ISBN 9780198257370.
- Corporations and the Third Way (2002), Hart Publishing, 178pp. ISBN 9781901362633.

Books as co-author

- Contract Law: Cases, Materials and Commentary, with Jo Shaw (1994), Oxford University Press, xliii + 918pp. ISBN 9780198762959.
- Disqualification of Directors, with Abbas Mithani (1996), Butterworths, xxxiii + 383pp. ISBN 9780406900258.
- Directors' Liabilities in the Context of Corporate Groups, with Gary Wilson (1998), GTI Specialist Publishers Ltd, x + 66p. ISBN 9781901122565.

Books as editor or co-editor

- Company Law (1993), Dartmouth Publishing, 500pp. ISBN 9781855213234.
- A Reader on the Law of the Business Enterprise (1994), Oxford University Press, 550pp. ISBN 9780198763475.
- Law and Society (Critical Concepts in Law), with Dave Cowan and Linda Mulcahy (2014) Routledge (four volumes), 736pp. ISBN 9780415686914.
- Law, Health and Medical Regulation, with Shaun McVeigh (1992), Dartmouth Publishing, 250pp. ISBN 9781855212831.
- In Search of the 'Underclass', with Laura Lundy, Mike Adler and John Morison (1997), Socio-Legal Studies Association, 116pp.
- Feminist Perspectives on Contract Law, with Linda Mulcahy (2005), Glasshouse Press, 180pp. ISBN 9781859417423.
- Changing Conceptions of Contract: Essays in Honour of Ian Macneil, with David Campbell and Linda Mulcahy (2013), Palgrave Macmillan, 264pp. ISBN 9781137269270.

Reports

- Law in the Real World: Improving our Understanding of How Law Works, with Hazel Genn and Martin Partington (2006), Nuffield Foundation, 62pp.
- Propensity to Apply for Judicial Office Under the New Northern Ireland Judicial Appointments System: A Qualitative Study for the Northern Ireland Judicial Appointments Commission, with Philip Leith, Marie Lynch, Lisa Glennon and Brice Dickson (2008). Queen's University Belfast, 113pp.
