= Pilestredet Park =

Neighborhood in Oslo, Norway

Coordinates: 59.92°N 10.738°E

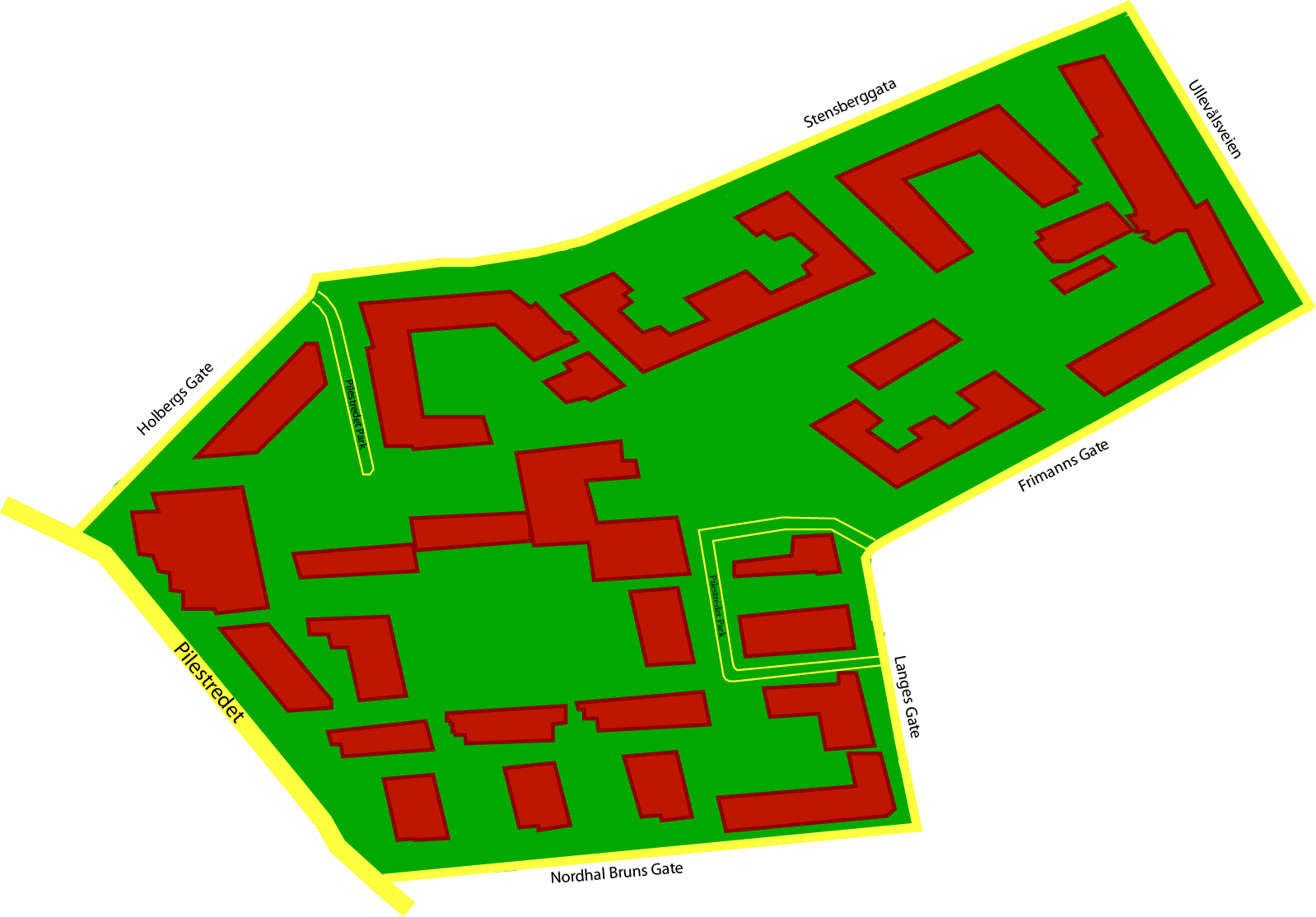
A simple map of Pilestredet Park and the bordering streets.

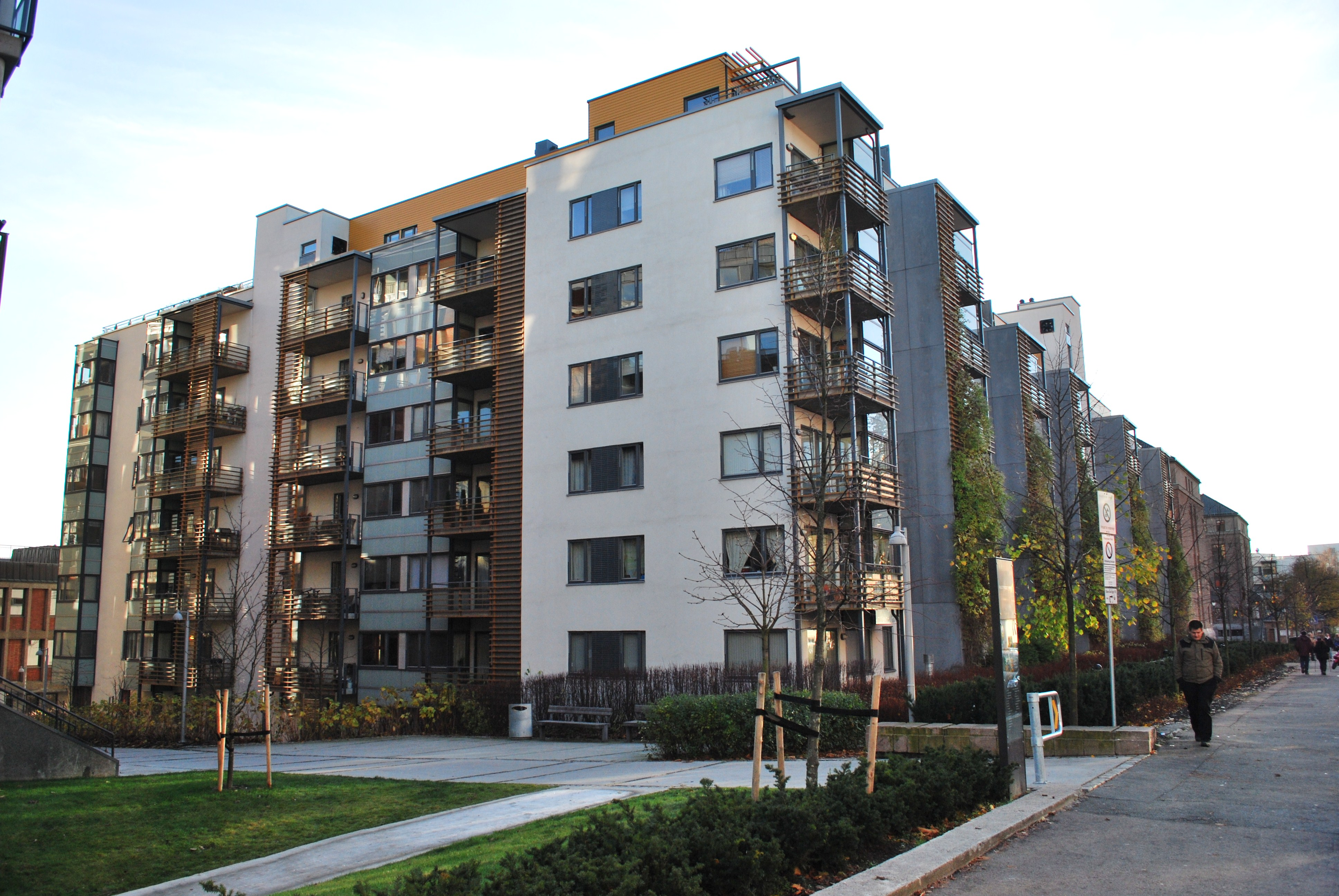
Apartments in Pilestredet Park

Pilestredet Park is a neighborhood in the borough St. Hanshaugen in Oslo, Norway, about one kilometer north of the city center.

It is named after the street Pilestredet. From 1893, it was the location of Rikshospitalet. The area underwent an urban renewal after 2000, when the hospital moved to Gaustad. The area is mostly residential, with about 2000 residents, and has some of the highest housing prices in the city.

Oslo Metropolitan University has a campus by Pilestredet Park. The area is served by the station Høyskolesenteret of the Oslo Tramway.
