= Økaw Arkitekter =

Architecture firm based in Oslo, Norway

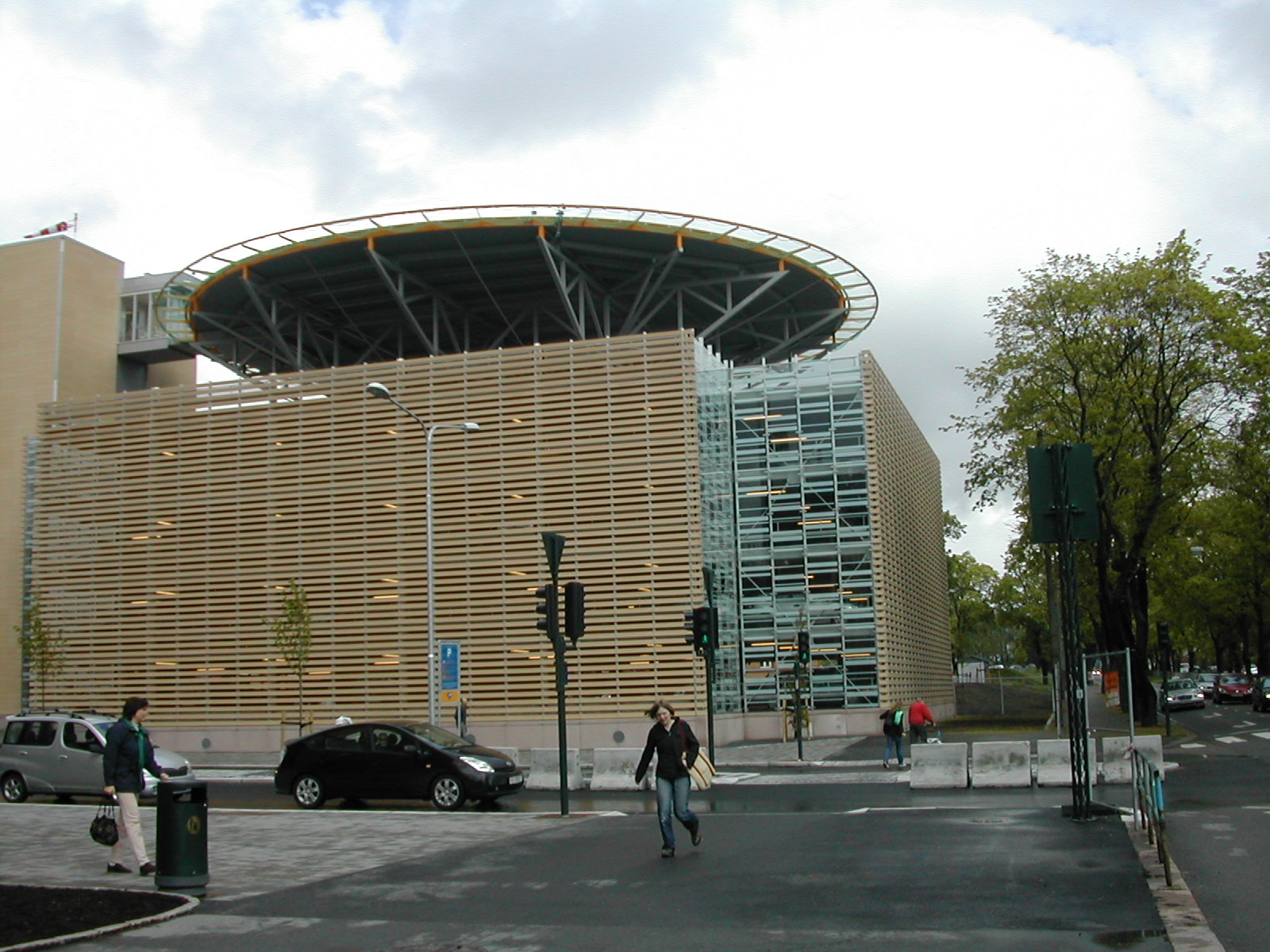
The combined helipad and parking house at Ullevål University Hospital was designed by ØKAW Arkitekter

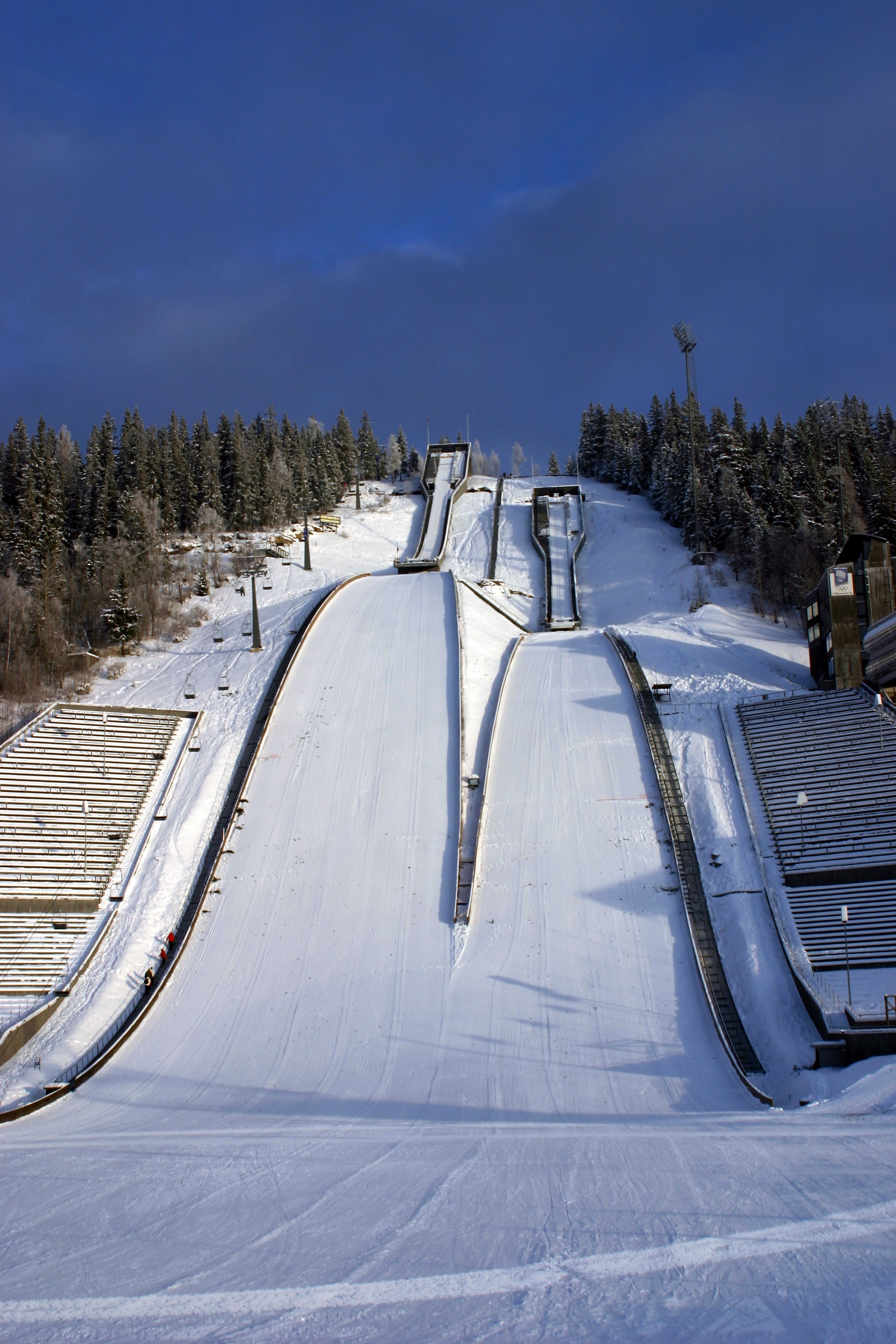
Lysgårdsbakken

ØKAW Arkitekter is an architecture firm based in Oslo, Norway and established in 1969. As of 2017, partners are Tom Wike, Øystein Midtbø, Rolf Erik Wahlstrøm, Trine Hauge, Hanne Sørbø, Elisabeth Edin Ruge, Tone Andreassen, Nicca Gade Christensen, Sturla Sandsdalen, Lasse Brøgger and Margrethe Maisey.

Projects include Akershus University College (2003), Holmenkollen National Arena (2010), Midtstubakken (2010), Lysgårdsbakken (1993), Birkebeineren Ski Stadium (1993), Kanthaugen Freestyle Arena (1993), Hotel Opera (2001), the operations area of Oslo Airport, Gardermoen (1999), Kreditkassen Headquarters (1987), several sections of Ullevål University Hospital (1987–2005) and Furuset Station (1978).
