= Liv Mjelde =

Norwegian professor

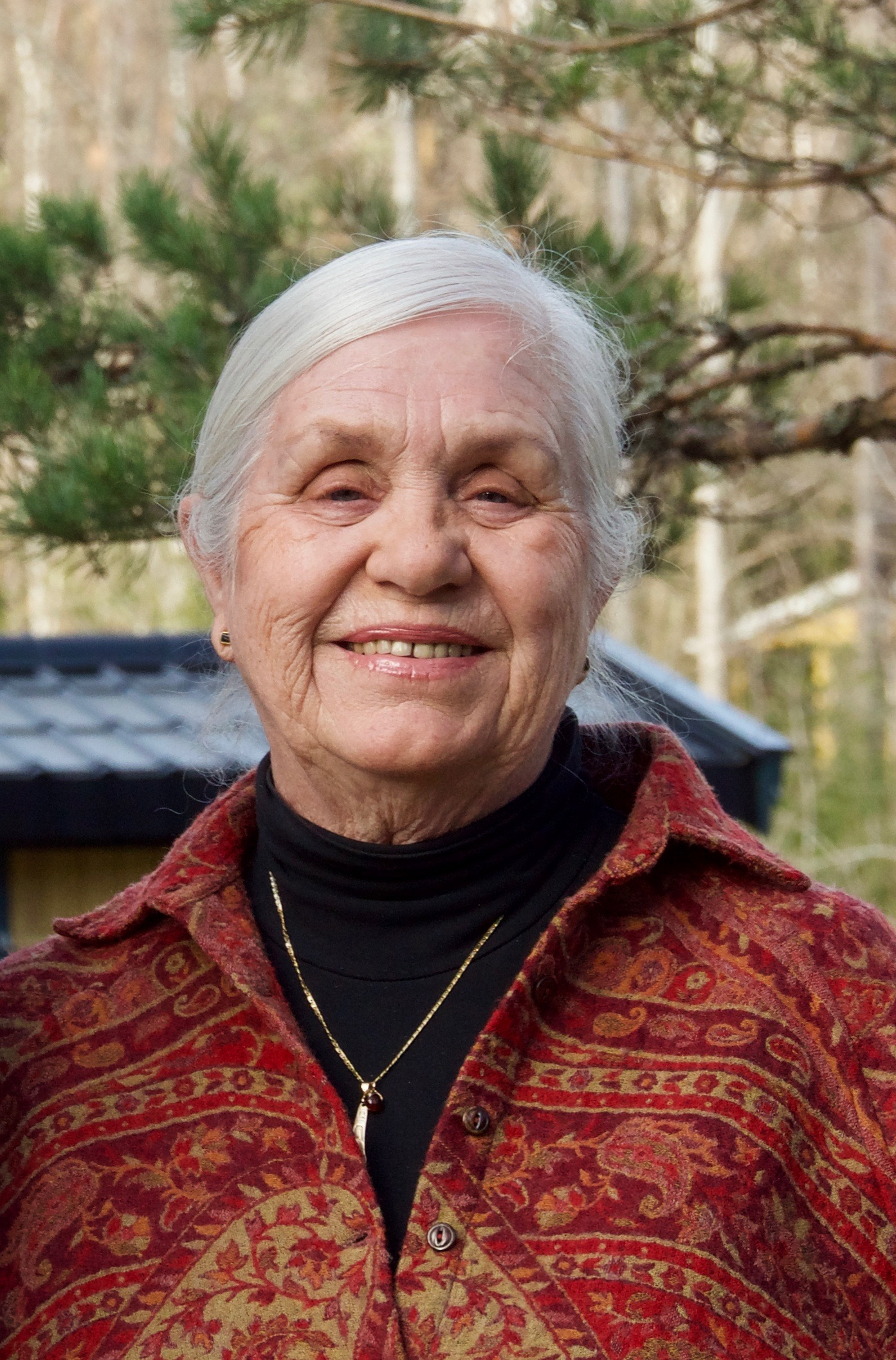
- Born: Liv Kitty Mjelde; August 29, 1939 (age 87)
- Citizenship: Norway

Academic background
- Education: University of Oslo
- Alma mater: University of Joensuu (now University of Eastern Finland)

Academic work
- Discipline: Sociology of education
- Institutions: Oslo Metropolitan University; Akershus University College; Ontario Institute for Studies in Education

Liv Kitty Mjelde (born 29 August 1939) is a Norwegian sociologist and educator, specializing in vocational pedagogy. She is Professor Emeritus at Oslo Metropolitan University (OsloMet). Her work focuses on the sociology of education, workshop-based and classroom learning, the social division of knowledge, and gender and labour in vocational education.

== Early life and education ==
Mjelde studied political science, history, and sociology at the University of Oslo, obtaining a cand.mag. degree in 1967 and a cand.sociol. in 1975. She earned her doctoral degree (Dr. Philos.) in sociology from the University of Joensuu (now University of Eastern Finland) in 1993, with a dissertation on apprenticeship and vocational learning.

== Academic career ==
Mjelde worked for many years in vocational education and teacher training, including 18 years as a counsellor at Sogn Vocational School in Oslo. She later held academic and research positions at Akershus University College (HiAk). Her international work includes visiting scholar appointments at institutions such as the Ontario Institute for Studies in Education (University of Toronto), University of Adelaide, and Kyambogo University. She led cooperative projects to develop a Master’s programme in Vocational Pedagogy at Kyambogo University with students from Uganda and South Sudan.

She is also a member European Association of Professors Emeriti.

In 2022, she received the Albert Nelson Marquis Lifetime Achievement Award from Marquis Who’s Who.

== Research and themes ==
Her scholarship has explored the intersection between manual and intellectual labor, the philosophy of vocational learning, and the cultural and gendered dimensions of apprenticeship traditions. These themes are developed in her works such as The Magical Properties of Workshop Learning and Apprenticeship: From Practice to Theory and Back Again, where she blends empirical observation with theoretical reflection on the social status of practical knowledge. Her work places emphasis on forms of knowledge, didactics, mentoring, and the historical evolution of vocational pedagogy.

Beyond academic publishing, Mjelde has contributed to documentary film projects addressing historical and social themes. She collaborated with filmmaker Tamara Sushko on Frozen Fish, Warm Voices (also referred to as Secrets in a Pair of Scissors), which was presented at documentary film festivals in the late 2010s.

Drawing inspiration from educational reformers such as Nadezhda Krupskaya, Lev Vygotsky, John Dewey, Célestin Freinet, Paulo Freire and Alexander Sutherland Neill. Mjelde links her pedagogical philosophy to a humanist and democratic tradition. Her writings engage with contemporary debates on post-Fordism, a socio-economic framework that demands an adaptable, skilled, and holistically developed workforce.

== Selected publications ==
- Mjelde, Liv; Daly, Richard (2020). "Vocational Pedagogy in Praxis : Lessons from Uganda". 技術教育学の探求. 21: 1–16. doi:10.18999/bulitv.21.1. ISSN 2189-6348.
- "Magical properties of workshop learning – By Liv Mjelde". British Journal of Educational Technology. 39 (3): 573–574. 2008-04-21. doi:10.1111/j.1467-8535.2008.00855_19.x. ISSN 0007-1013.
- Mjelde, Liv (2022), "Liv Mjelde in Conversation with Fatma Mizikaci and Eda Ata", Critical Pedagogy and the Covid-19 Pandemic, Bloomsbury Academic, doi:10.5040/9781350274914.ch-009, ISBN 978-1-350-27491-4
- Mjelde, Liv (2006). The Magical Properties of Workshop Learning. Peter Lang. ISBN 978-3-03910-348-5.
- Mjelde, Liv, ed. (2006). Working knowledge in a globalizing world: from work to learning, from learning to work. Studien zur Berufs- und Weiterbildung. Bern Berlin Frankfurt am Main: Lang. ISBN 978-3-03910-974-6.
- Weil, Markus; Koski, Leena; Mjelde, Liv (2009). Knowing work: the social relations of working and knowing. Studies in vocational and continuing education. Bern: P. Lang. ISBN 978-3-03911-642-3.
