= Blichfeldt =

Blichfeldt is a Scandinavian surname. Notable people with this name include:

- Alberte Blichfeldt, Danish actress in The Woman That Dreamed About a Man (2010) and The Great Bear (2011)
- Anders Blichfeldt, Danish pop/rock musician in Big Fat Snake
- Bror Blichfeldt, Norwegian footballer, scored in Football at the 1997 Island Games
- Ebbe Blichfeldt, Danish wheelchair racer
- Emil Blichfeldt (1849–1908), Danish architect
- Emilie Blichfeldt (born 1991), Norwegian filmmaker
- Hans Frederick Blichfeldt (1873–1945), Danish-American mathematician
- Jon Frode Blichfeldt (born 1944), Norwegian psychologist
- Kathinka Blichfeldt, Norwegian textbook author, winner of 2006 Brage Prize
- Mia Blichfeldt (born 1997), Danish badminton player
