= Olav Eikeland =

Norwegian philosopher (1955–2023)

Olav Eikeland (10 October 1955 – 1 September 2023) was a Norwegian philosopher and working life researcher. In 2008, he became professor of work research and research director for the Program for Research on Education and Work at Oslo Metropolitan University (formerly Oslo and Akershus University College of Applied Sciences). Beginning in 2012, he was also vice dean of the Faculty of Education and International Studies. He was a researcher at the Work Research Institute from 1985 to 2008, and served as the institute's director 2003-2004. He died on 1 September 2023, at the age of 67.

== Works ==
- The Ways of Aristotle, Bern: Peter Lang, 2008
- Action research and organisation theory, Frankfurt am Main: Peter Lang, 2008, with Anne Marie Berg
- Erfaring, dialogikk og politikk; et begrepshistorisk og filosofisk bidrag til rekonstruksjonen av empirisk samfunnsvitenskap, 1992
