= Work Research Institute =

Norwegian research institute

The Work Research Institute (WRI) (Norwegian: Arbeidsforskningsinstituttet, AFI), formerly known as the Institute of Work Psychology, is a Norwegian government-owned social science research institute in Oslo. Its purpose is to "produce systematic knowledge on working life" based on industrial and organizational psychology and other social sciences. It is part of Oslo Metropolitan University and was formerly an independent state-owned research institute from its establishment in 1964 until 2014.

== History ==
The institute was founded in 1964, originally named the Institute of Work Psychology (Arbeidspsykologisk institutt), as one of several institutes which together made up the Work Research Institutes. In 1986, the Institute of Work Psychology became a fully independent institute and renamed the Work Research Institute, and the other institutes shortly after became the National Institute of Occupational Health.

The institute was organized as a government agency under the Ministry of Labour and Government Administration until 2002, when it became a wholly owned governmental limited company, since 2005 administered by the Ministry of Education and Research. In 2014, it merged with Oslo and Akershus University College, while maintaining its separate identity and autonomy; in 2018 Oslo and Akershus University College became Oslo Metropolitan University. It is currently part of the Centre for Welfare and Labour Research at Oslo Metropolitan University, together with the sister institutes Norwegian Social Research, the Norwegian Institute for Urban and Regional Research and the National Institute for Consumer Research.

The current director of WRI is Elisabeth Nørgaard. The institute publishes series of reports, occasional papers and monographs.

The institute's history is linked to the action research tradition where partaking in development work is central.

== Academics ==
- Jorun Solheim
- Bjørg Aase Sørensen
- Bjørn Gustavsen
- Olav Eikeland
- Einar Thorsrud
- Øystein Gullvåg Holter
- Margunn Bjørnholt
- I. H. Monrad Aas
- Torild Skard
- Jon Frode Blichfeldt
