= Norwegian Social Research =

Norwegian state social research institute

- Norsk institutt for forskning om oppvekst, velferd og aldring
- Abbreviation: NOVA
- Formation: 1996; 30 years ago
- Type: Government-owned research institute
- Location: Oslo
- Parent organization: Oslo Metropolitan University
- Staff: 63 (2019)
- Website: nova.no

Norwegian Social Research (Norwegian: Norsk institutt for forskning om oppvekst, velferd og aldring, NOVA) is a state social science research institute based in Oslo, Norway. It is part of Oslo Metropolitan University, and was formerly an independent state agency from its establishment in 1996 until 2014. Together with the Work Research Institute, the Norwegian Institute for Urban and Regional Research and the National Institute for Consumer Research, it now forms the Centre for Welfare and Labour Research at Oslo Metropolitan University.

The institute is one of the largest social research institutes in Norway, and conducts research on different aspects of society and the welfare state. The institute has 63 employees, including 21 research professors and 10 PhD students. The director of the institute is Guro Ødegård.

NOVA's research is centered on Norwegian society. The aim of the institute is to develop knowledge and understanding of social conditions and processes of change. They focus on issues of life-course events, level of living conditions and aspects of life-quality as well as on programmes and services provided by the welfare system. Within its fields NOVA performs research assignments commissioned by public and private sector clients.
