= Oslo Metropolitan University =

State university in Oslo and Kjeller in Norway

- Oslomet – storbyuniversitetet
- Type: University
- Established: 12 January 2018; 8 years ago
- Academic staff: 1366
- Administrative staff: 792
- Students: c. 20,000
- Location: Oslo and Kjeller, Norway; 59°55′18.73″N 10°44′0.26″E
- Predecessor institution: Oslo and Akershus University College
- Website: oslomet.no

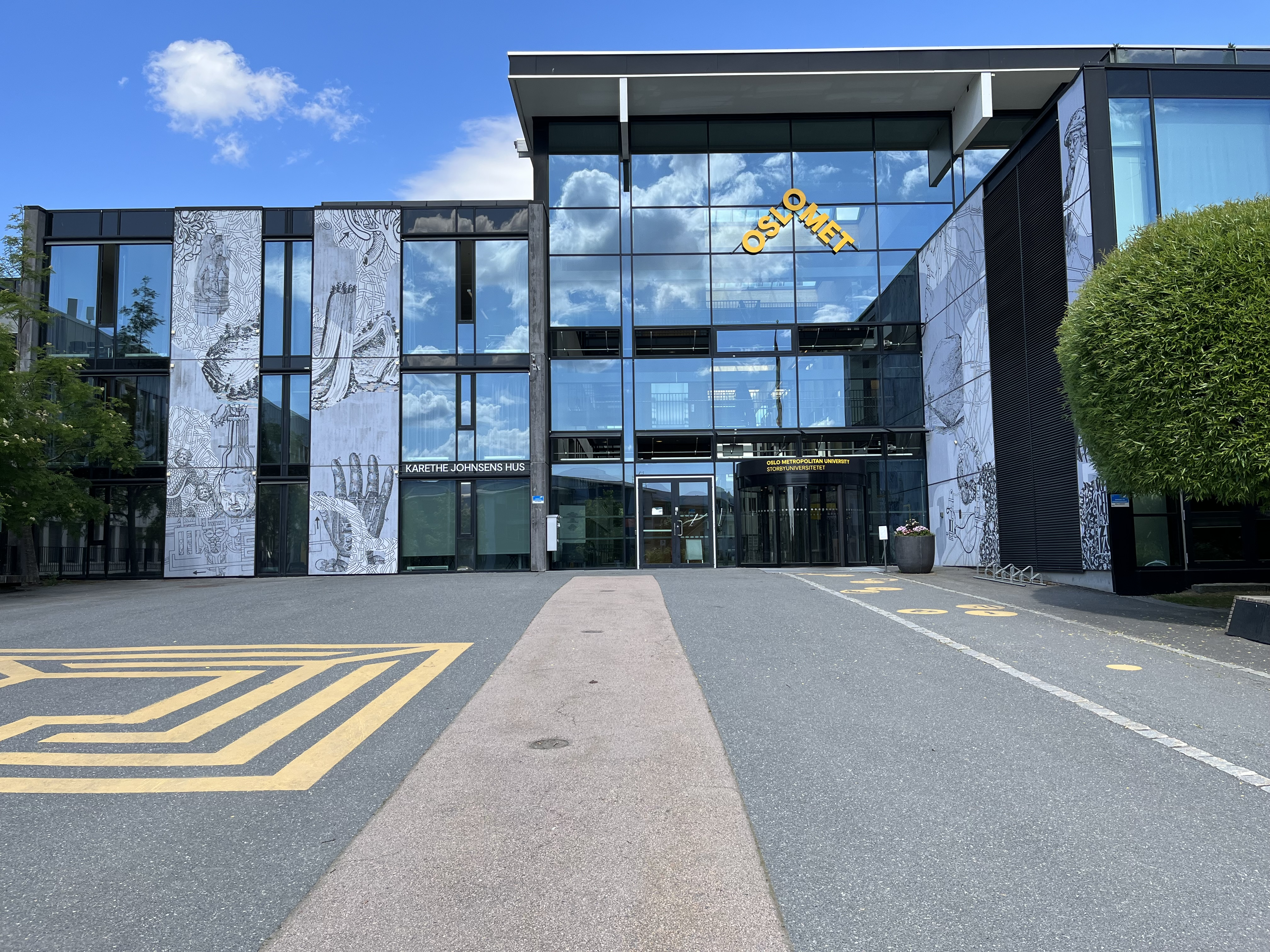
Oslo Metropolitan University, Kjeller campus

Oslo Metropolitan University (Oslomet; Norwegian: Oslomet – storbyuniversitetet) is a state university in Oslo and Kjeller in Norway. It is the result of the merger of many former vocational colleges in the Greater Oslo Region. It has around 1,400 academic employees (of which over 150 are professors/research professors, the top rank in Norway), around 20,000 students and around 800 administrative support staff.

Oslo Metropolitan University was established on 12 January 2018 and is the second youngest of Norway's new universities. It evolved from what was until 2018 Norway's largest university college, Oslo and Akershus University College, which was itself the result of many previous mergers of around 30 former vocational colleges and community colleges in the Oslo area.

Most of the university is located in the city centre of Oslo along the Pilestredet street, with subsidiary campuses in Kjeller in Akershus. The rector of the university is Christen Krogh.

== History ==
=== Roots in vocational colleges and academization from the 1990s ===
Oslo Metropolitan University evolved from a former state university college, Oslo and Akershus University College, which was established in 2011 through the merger of Oslo University College and Akershus University College. Both these institutions had been formed in 1994 through the mergers of many former colleges in the Greater Oslo Region. These colleges historically focused on vocational education, such as teacher and nursing education, but from the mid-1990s the newly formed Oslo University College and Akershus University College had gradually become more similar to universities through of a process of "academization", similar to the development of British polytechnics into new universities. This involved broadening their scope to include more traditionally academic disciplines and placing increased emphasis on research and education at master's and PhD levels, as well as increasingly favouring recruitment at the associate professor level or higher. From 1995, the colleges were also governed by the same law and regulatory framework as the universities. Thus, by the 2000s the formal differences between universities and university colleges had become minimal, although the university colleges were still less research-intensive and with a more vocational focus.

=== Mergers with research institutes ===
In 2014 and 2016 the then-university college merged with four of Norway's largest social science research institutes. These were the Work Research Institute, Norwegian Social Research, the Norwegian Institute for Urban and Regional Research and the National Institute for Consumer Research. However these research institutes remain entirely separate from the university college and retain their autonomy.

=== University status ===
On 12 January 2018 the King-in-Council granted the institution the status of a university.

=== Name ===
The first part of the Norwegian version of the university's name, Oslomet, and particularly the spelling used by the institution in its marketing, OsloMet, is controversial and the state Language Council of Norway determined that it violated correct Norwegian spelling and the rules governing names of state institutions, and recommended that the government rejected the name. Some newspapers such as Morgenbladet announced that they would write the name in accordance with Norwegian spelling rules as Oslomet. The name "OsloMet" was heavily criticized in the media and described as a "triumph of emptiness" in Aftenposten. On 18 January 2018 the state Language Council of Norway determined that the correct spelling of the university's Norwegian name, which is mandatory in official government usage, is Oslomet – storbyuniversitetet. In the official list of correct spellings of names of government agencies, the name is spelled Oslomet – storbyuniversitetet in Bokmål and Nynorsk.

The use of any variation of the abbreviation "Oslo Met" is also disputed because the state Norwegian Meteorological Institute objects to its usage due to its similarity to one of their own international abbreviations; for example the World Meteorological Organization, an agency of the United Nations, recommended "MET OSLO" as an international standard abbreviation for the Norwegian Meteorological Institute already in 1956, and the institute uses "MET" as its abbreviation for domestic purposes and "MET Norway" or "MET Oslo" internationally; MET Oslo is also used domestically to refer specifically to its headquarters in Oslo.

A branding document published on the university's website and aimed at its employees claims the institution should be referred to as "OsloMet – Oslo Metropolitan University;" however the Language Council rejected several of the key claims in the document and the document was subject to ridicule in the Dagsnytt Atten news magazine of the state broadcaster NRK, in which the management at Oslo Metropolitan University refused to participate.

In the Sami languages traditionally spoken by the small Sami minority in Northern Norway and part of Central Norway, the university's name is Oslomet – stuorragávpotuniversitehta in Northern Sami, Oslomet – stuorstádauniversitiehtta in Lule Sami and Oslomet – stoerrestaareuniversiteete in Southern Sami. The university also announced it would translate its name into Norwegian Sign Language.

== Condemnation of Israel and Israeli Higher Education Boycott ==
On February 13, 2024, the university's board announced that it condemns "Israel's attack on Gaza" and will immediately end its exchange agreement with the University of Haifa, and not enter into any new general cooperation agreements on institutional cooperation with Israeli universities or colleges. The decision was criticized by a former professor at the university, Torkel Brekke, who claimed in an editorial in the Wall Street Journal that the decision is indicative a "post-Holocaust strain of antisemitism... cloaked under another name—"anti-Zionism"."

== Organisation ==
The university has the following faculties:

- Faculty of Health Sciences
- Faculty of Education and International Studies
- Faculty of Social Sciences
- Faculty of Technology, Art and Design

The university also includes the following autonomous research institutes:

- Work Research Institute
- Norwegian Social Research
- Norwegian Institute for Urban and Regional Research
- National Institute for Consumer Research

== Education ==
The primary language of instruction is Norwegian. However certain courses are taught in foreign languages, mainly English, German and French; this includes language education for teachers, and various other courses, such as courses aimed at international students.

== Ranks ==
Oslo Metropolitan University uses all three academic career pathways in Norway. The main career pathway includes the ranks assistant professor, associate professor and professor. The research career pathway is mainly used at the Work Research Institute, Norwegian Social Research, the Norwegian Institute for Urban and Regional Research and the National Institute for Consumer Research, and includes the ranks researcher, senior researcher and research professor, which correspond directly to assistant professor, associate professor and professor and have similar promotion criteria. The teaching career pathway is still used by the original university college, and includes the ranks first lecturer and docent as alternatives to the associate professor and professor ranks.

== Notable academics ==
- Olav Eikeland, Professor of Work Research
- Jan Grund, Professor of Management
- Jon Samseth, Professor of Energy Physics
- Knut Seip, Professor of Environmental Management
- Rune Slagstad, Professor of Sociology
- Steinar Stjernø, Professor of Social Policy
- Ingunn Sandaker, Professor of Behavioral Science
- Per Holth, Professor of Behavior Analysis
- Liv Mjelde, professor emeritus of Vocational Pedagogy
- Erik Arntzen, professor of Behavior Analysis

== Management ==
Rector Christen Krogh was appointed as rector on December 8, 2021.

Curt Rice, an American linguist who was formerly a professor at the University of Tromsø, became rector on August 1, 2015. He is not the first non-Norwegian to head a Norwegian university or college however, as the University of Oslo has had several non-Norwegian chancellors in the past.
