= Oslo Met =

Oslo Met may refer to

- The Norwegian Meteorological Institute in Oslo, which is also known under the abbreviation Met Oslo since the early 20th century
- Oslo Metropolitan University, which uses the abbreviation OsloMet since 2018
