= JEEP II =

Permanently shutdown Norwegian research reactor

JEEP II was a research reactor in Kjeller, Norway that was in operation between 1966 and 2018. The reactor was operated by the Institute for Energy Technology (IFE). Construction of JEEP II began in 1965, and the reactor went critical for the first time in December 1966.

The reactor had a thermal power of 2 MW. It used heavy water as a moderator and coolant, and used low-enriched uranium as fuel. JEEP II was used for basic research in solid state physics, neutron irradiation of materials and production of radioactive isotopes.

The reactor was stopped on December 15, 2018 for scheduled maintenance, whereby major damage was discovered. This meant that IFE's board decided on 25 April 2019 not to restart the reactor but instead to start decommissioning.
