= Norwegian Nuclear Commission =

The Norwegian Nuclear Commission (Norwegian: Kjernekraftutvalget) was appointed in June 2024 to consider the role of nuclear power in Norway.

The commission reported to Minister of Energy Terje Aasland on 8 April 2026. The report found that nuclear power is not profitable in Norway because the electricity prices are too low to justify the necessary investment.
