= Jon Frode Blichfeldt =

Norwegian psychologist

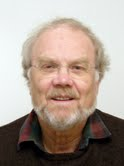
Jon Frode Blichfeldt

Jon Frode Blichfeldt (born June 24, 1944 in Oslo) is a Norwegian Professor Emerius of Education and Psychology.

He was a researcher at the Work Research Institute from 1970 to 2004, and the institute's director from 1986 to 1989. From 1994 to 2004, he was also Professor of Psychology at the University of Oslo (part-time). He was Professor of Education at Oslo University College from 2004 to 2011.

He has also worked for UNDP. He was a member of the Committee to Evaluate the School Curriculum.

== Bibliography ==
- Blichfeldt, J.F. (2010): On knowledge bases and maps of knowledge. Some quiddities on getting to know in contemporary higher education. Nordic Studies in Education, Vol. 30 pp. 252–265.
- Blichfeldt, J.F. (2007): Supporting good work? In: Löwstedt, J, Larsson, P, Karsten, S, and VanDick, R (eds): From intensified work to professional development. P.I.E. Peter Lang, Brussels
- Blichfeldt, J.F. (2004): Oppgaverasjonalitet og Kunnskapsforståelse. Nordiske Organisasjonsstudier nr. 4
- Blichfeldt, J.F. (2003): Lære for livet? Skolen som møteplass for mening og mestring. Evaluering av Reform 97. AFI-rapport nr. 7
- Blichfeldt, J.F. og Aamodt, P.O. (1999): Om følgeforskningen i R94. I Kvalsund, R, Deichman-Sørensen, T. og Aamodt, P.O.(red): Videregående skole ved en skillevei? Oslo Tano Aschehoug.
- Blichfeldt, J.F. (1996). Organisering og samarbeid: Motsetningsfylte prosesser. I Blichfeldt m.fl.: Utdanning for alle. Evaluering av Reform 94. Oslo, Tano Aschehoug.
- Blichfeldt, J.F. Haugen, R. og Jangård, H. (1978) : Mot en ny skoleorganisasjon. Oslo Tanum.
- Blichfeldt, J.F. (1973): Bakerst i klassen. Oslo Norli.
