= Oslo and Akershus University College =

State university college in Norway

Coordinates: 59°55′18.73″N 10°44′0.26″E

Oslo and Akershus University College of Applied Sciences
- Høgskolen i Oslo og Akershus
- Type: University college
- Active: 2011–2018
- Rector: Curt Rice
- Students: c. 20,000 (2016)
- Location: Oslo, Sandvika and Kjeller, Norway
- Successor institution: Oslo Metropolitan University
- Website: hioa.no

Oslo and Akershus University College (Norwegian: Høgskolen i Oslo og Akershus, abbr. HiOA) was the largest state university college in Norway from its establishment in 2011 until 2018, when it was transformed into Oslo Metropolitan University, the youngest of Norway's new universities.

It had more than 20,000 students and 2,100 employees. HiOA had higher education programs at bachelor's, master's and PhD level. It offered studies and conducted research in health professions, social sciences, engineering, liberal arts, and other fields.

HiOA was established in 2011 following the merger of Oslo University College and Akershus University College, which were themselves the results of many previous mergers. In 2014 the Work Research Institute and Norwegian Social Research were also merged into the institution, and from 2016 it also incorporates the Norwegian Institute for Urban and Regional Research and the National Institute for Consumer Research. Most of the university college was located in the city centre of Oslo along the Pilestredet street, with subsidiary campuses in Sandvika and Kjeller in Akershus.

== Education ==
The language of instruction was Norwegian, and certain courses were taught in English, both on bachelor's degree and master's degree level and to some extent on PhD level.

== Management ==
Curt Rice, an American linguist who was formerly a professor at the University of Tromsø, became rector on August 1, 2015. He is not the first non-Norwegian to head a Norwegian university or college however, as the University of Oslo has been headed by the French-born Oscar I of Sweden and various Swedish statesmen as chancellors.

== Faculties ==
- Faculty of Health Sciences
- Faculty of Education and International Studies
- Faculty of Social Sciences
- Faculty of Technology, Art and Design

== Centres ==
- Centre for Educational Research and Development
- Centre for Welfare and Labour Research
- Centre for the Study of Professions
- National Centre for Multicultural Education
- Learning Centre

=== Centre for the Study of Professions ===
Centre for the Study of Professions (CSP, Norwegian: Senter for profesjonsstudier) was formally opened in 1999 in order to stimulate research and critical reflection within the study of professions.

The study of professions includes several areas of research, such as:

- professional practice, its autonomy, social organisation, and governance
- the qualification of professionals, work motivation, and professional careers
- the social and historical role of professions

CSP develops the study of professions as a multidisciplinary field of research emphasising comparative approaches. The goal of CSP is to become a leading research facility within the study of professions in the Nordic countries.

CSP carries out a number of projects and activities, among them

- Ph.D. programme in the study of professions
- Various research projects
- StudData – Database for Studies of Recruitment and Qualification in the Professions

Ongoing research projects in English:

- Qualifying for professional careers (QPC)
- Teachers' Professional Qualification (TPQ)

CSP currently employs approximately 40 professors, researchers, fellows and administrative staff. CSP also hosts the open access journal Professions and Professionalism.

=== Centre for the Study of Professions ===
- Centre for the Study of Professions
- Qualifying for professional Careers (QPC)
- Teachers' Professional Qualification (TPQ)

=== Centre for Welfare and Labour Research ===
Centre for Welfare and Labour Research (SVA) consists of Work Research Institute (AFI), Norwegian Social Research (NOVA), Norwegian Institute for Urban and Regional Research (NIBR), and Consumption Research Norway (SIFO).

- http://www.hioa.no/eng/About-HiOA/Centre-for-Welfare-and-Labour-Research

== See also ==
- Library assessment
