= Curt Rice =

American linguist

Curtis Calvin Rice (born 1962) is an American-born Norwegian linguist. He was the rector of the Norwegian University of Life Sciences from 2021 to 2023. Until 2021, he was the rector of Oslo Metropolitan University and formerly of its predecessor institution, Oslo and Akershus University College. Rice was the first rector of Oslo Metropolitan University who was not elected. He began his rectorship at Oslo Metropolitan University on 1 August 2015. A major issue of his tenure as rector has been the question of whether HiOA should apply for the status of a university to become one of Norway's new universities; it received this status on 12 January 2018. Rice is known for controversial views on the status of the Norwegian language in academia, having called for a ban on research papers in Norwegian.

== Early career ==
Rice grew up in Rochester, Minnesota, and graduated from high school there in 1980. He is an alumnus of Rochester Mayo High School. He studied philosophy at Augsburg College in Minnesota and graduated with a bachelor's degree in 1984. He spent the 1984–1985 academic year as a Fulbright grantee at KU Leuven, Belgium. He earned a PhD in general linguistics at the University of Texas at Austin in 1991. His research has focused on generative grammar and phonology.

== Academic positions ==
Rice was a professor in the Department of Languages and Linguistics at the University of Tromsø, Norway. He represented the academic employees on the university board in Tromsø and served as Pro-Rector for Research and Development 2009–2013. He was also director of the Center for Advanced Study in Theoretical Linguistics (CASTL) at the University of Tromsø. In 2012, Rice applied unsuccessfully for the rector position at the Norwegian University of Science and Technology.

In 2015 he was appointed as the first non-elected rector of Oslo and Akershus University College. The college received the status of a university in 2018, and became Oslo Metropolitan University.

In April 2024, it was announced that Rice would be the new Executive Director of Fulbright Norway.

== Norwegian academic controversy ==
Rice is known for controversial views on the use of the Norwegian language in academia, which have been criticized by the Language Council of Norway and Norwegian academics and media on several occasions. He has called for "banning research papers in Norwegian" and claimed that academics who write in Norwegian "abdicate as academics." He has also called for less use of Norwegian in higher education and more use of English. He has instituted policies at Oslo Metropolitan University that no longer require fluency in Norwegian, which drew widespread criticism. His views have been noted to be at odds with the government's policy of promoting the Norwegian language in research and higher education. Dagbladet commentator Inger Merete Hobbelstad has noted that "Curt Rice would probably have liked being in Norwegian academia, had it not been Norwegian." His promotion of the name "OsloMet", and subsequently his promotion of the English name as the primary name, was criticized by the Language Council, linguists, politicians and media commentators.

Rice has chaired the Committee on Gender Equality and Diversity in Research and the board of CRIStin.

== Writing ==
Rice blogs for The Guardian about open access, leadership, and gender equality issues in higher education.

== Personal life ==
He is married to Tove I. Dahl, who also studied at Augsburg College and who is a professor of educational psychology at the University of Tromsø as well as the dean of Skogfjorden, the Norwegian Language Village at Concordia Language Villages.
