= Jorun Solheim =

Norwegian anthropologist (born 1944)

Jorun Solheim (born 18 November 1944) is a Norwegian social anthropologist and women's studies academic, whose work is centered on gender, culture and modernity.

She was lecturer in social anthropology at the University of Oslo from 1971 to 1983, Researcher at the Work Research Institute from 1981 to 2001 and Professor at the Centre for Women's Studies at the University of Oslo from 1994 to 1999. She is currently Senior Researcher at the Norwegian Institute of Social Research. In 2007, she became editor-in-chief of Tidsskrift for kjønnsforskning. She has a mag.art. (i.e. PhD) degree in social anthropology from 1970.

== Works ==
- Kjønn og modernitet, 2007
- Den usynlige hånd?, 2002
- Den åpne kroppen, 1998
