= Bjørn Gustavsen =

Norwegian academic

Bjørn Gustavsen (born April 3, 1938) is a Norwegian academic and working life researcher. He has been Director of the Work Research Institute (1972–1983) and Professor at the Arbetslivscentrum in Stockholm (1986–1999), the University of Oslo (1995–1999) and the Norwegian University of Science and Technology (from 2000). He is originally trained as a lawyer, and took the cand.jur. degree at the University of Oslo in 1964. He was an assistant judge 1965-66. After fours years as a research fellow at Norges almenvitenskapelige forskningsråd, he became a researcher at the Work Research Institute in 1970.

Much of his academic work belongs to the action research tradition. He had a central role in the drafting of the Norwegian Working Environment Act. He has also taken a great interest in the Nordic Model, which he sees not so much in terms of economic policies but in the practical cooperation between the social partners, and between these partners and political institutions.

== Bibliography ==
- 1969: Bedriftsorganisasjon : Alternative modeller
- 1992: Dialogue and development - Theory of communication, action research and the restructuring of working
- 2001: Creating connectedness - The role of social research in innovation policy, med Håkon Finne og Bo Oscarsson, Amsterdam: John Benjamins Publishing Company. Dialogues on Work and Innovation, vol. 13.
- 2004: Kan regionale bedriftsnettverk skapes gjennom forskning? - Refleksjoner om forholdet mellom teori og praksis, i Dale, B., Karlsdottir, R., Strandhagen O. (red.) «Bedrifter i nettverk». Trondheim: Tapir Akademisk Forlag. s. 371-385.
- 2004: Making knowledge actionable - From theoretical centralism to distributive constructivism «Concepts and Transformation» (artikkelsamling), vol. 9, no. 2, s. 147-180.
- 2007: Learning together for local innovation: promoting learning regions, med Richard Ennals og Barry Nyhan.
- 2008: Learning from Workplace Development Initiatives: External Evaluations versus Internal Understandings, International journal of action research, Special issue: Working life reform in difficult times: International experiences. Vol. 4, no. 1+2, pp. 15–38.
