= Bjørg Aase Sørensen =

Norwegian sociologist (1944–2010)

Bjørg Aase Sørensen (18 February 1944 – 16 June 2010) was a Norwegian sociologist. She was senior researcher at the Work Research Institute, professor at Vestfold University College and adjunct professor at the University of Oslo. She was editor-in-chief of Acta Sociologica from 1974 to 1976.
