= I. H. Monrad Aas =

Norwegian researcher (born 1948)

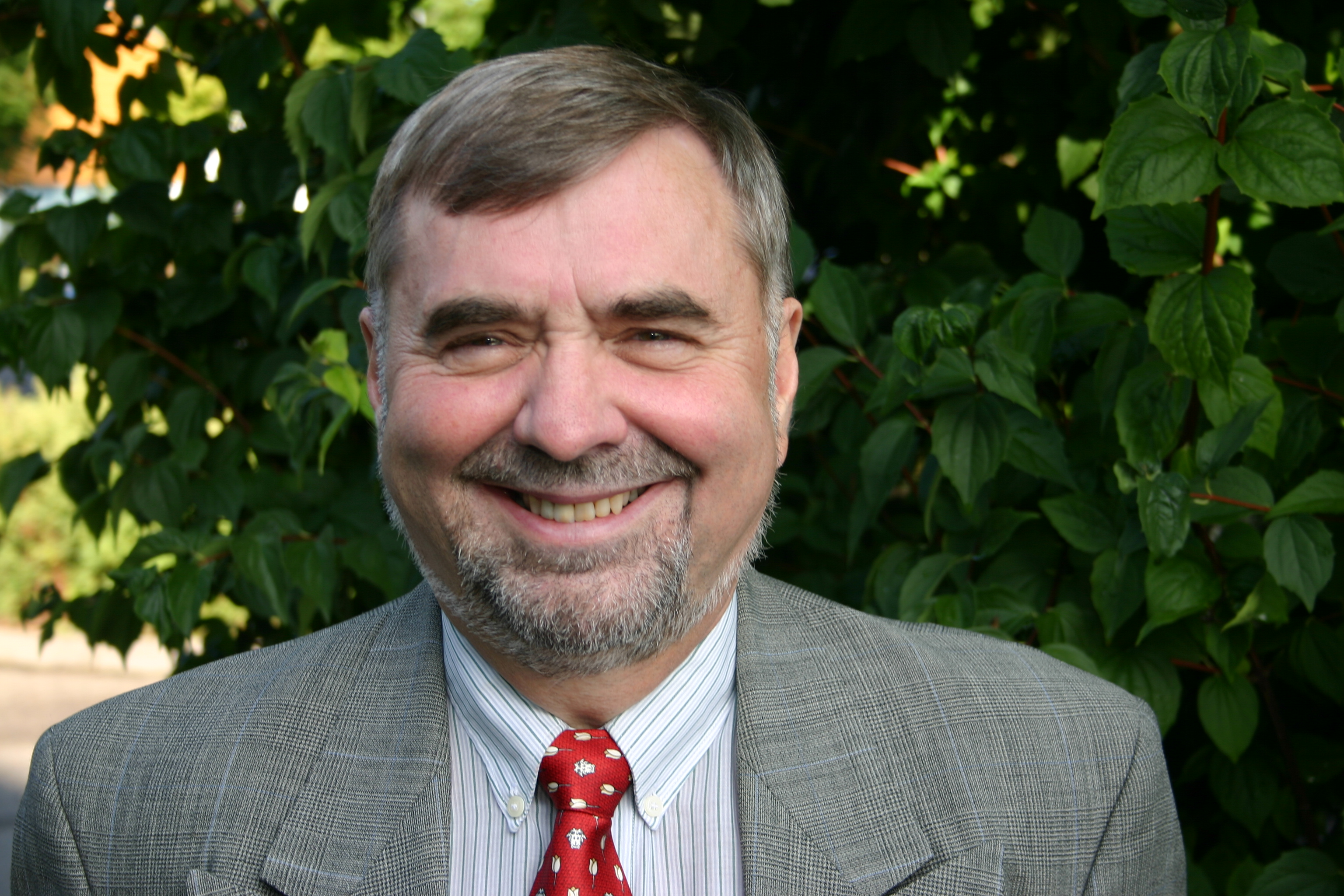
Photo: Øistein Bjørvik

Inge Harald Monrad Aas (born October 21, 1948) is a Norwegian researcher.

Born in Steinkjer, he was educated in odontology at the University of Oslo (1973) and has his doctoral degree (1983) from the same institution. He started in research in 1976 and has had focus on health services research, telemedicine, health care management, health policy, psychiatry (GAF) and research methodology. He has full professor competence (from 1994), been invited speaker to international conferences in Europe, Australia, New Zealand, USA and the Middle East, been mentor and given feedback to more than 250 research works, at the Nordic School of Public Health leading international courses at high level in management and international courses for researchers. He has worked with the University of Oslo (1976–1984), the Norwegian Institute for Hospital Research (1985–1989), the Nordic School of Public Health in Gothenburg (1990–1995), the Norwegian Work Research Institute in Oslo (1995–2006), the Research Department of Vestfold Mental Health Care Trust in Tønsberg (2006-2011) and at the Research Unit, Division of Mental Health and Addiction, Vestfold Hospital Trust. He has had elected positions, for example member of the Oslo Students Parliament (1970–1973) and leader of the Norwegian Association for Researchers at Vestfold Mental Health Care Trust (2007-2012) and Vestfold Hospital Trust (2012-2015). He became a fellow at the Royal Society of Medicine (London) in 2011.

== Selected bibliography ==
- «Global Assessment of Functioning (GAF): properties and frontier of current knowledge» In: Annals of General Psychiatry 2010; 9: 20
- «Guidelines for rating Global Assessment of Functioning (GAF)» In: Annals of General Psychiatry 2011; 10: 2
- «The future of telemedicine – take the organisational challenge!». In: Journal of Telemedicine and Telecare 2007; 13: 379-381.
- The organizational challenge for health care from telemedicine and e-health. The Work Research Institute, Oslo 2007. (155 pages).
- «Organizational centralization in radiology». In: Journal of Telemedicine and Telecare 2006; 12: 27-32.
- «Changes in the job situation due to telemedicine». In: Journal of Telemedicine and Telecare 2002; 8: 41-47.
- «Telemedical work and co-operation», In: Journal of Telemedicine and Telecare 2001; 7:212-218.
- «A qualitative study of the organizational consequences of telemedicine». In: Journal of Telemedicine and Telecare 2001;7: 18-26.
- «Organizational change: Decentralization in hospitals». In: International Journal of Health Planning and Management 1997;12:103-114.
- «Incentives and financing methods». In: Health Policy 1995; 34: 205-220.
- «Malpractice». Quality Assurance in Health Care 1991;3:21-39.
- Poliklinikker og dagkirurgi. Virksomhets-beskrivelse for ambulant helsetjeneste. (Outpatient clinics and daysurgery. Describing the activity of ambulatory care). NHV-rapport 1991:4, Nordiska Hälsovårdshögskolan, Göteborg 1991, (107 pages).
- Aas IHM, Freeman JL, Palmer GR & Fetter RB. The making of Norwegian DRGs. NIS report 3/89. Trondheim 1988. (147 pages). ISBN 82-595-5615-4
- «Variability of a dental morphological trait». In: Acta Odontologica Scandinavica 1983;41:257-263.
- Publications in database for Norwegian research
