= Institute for Energy Technology =

Norwegian research institute

Coordinates: 59.9743°N 11.0513°E

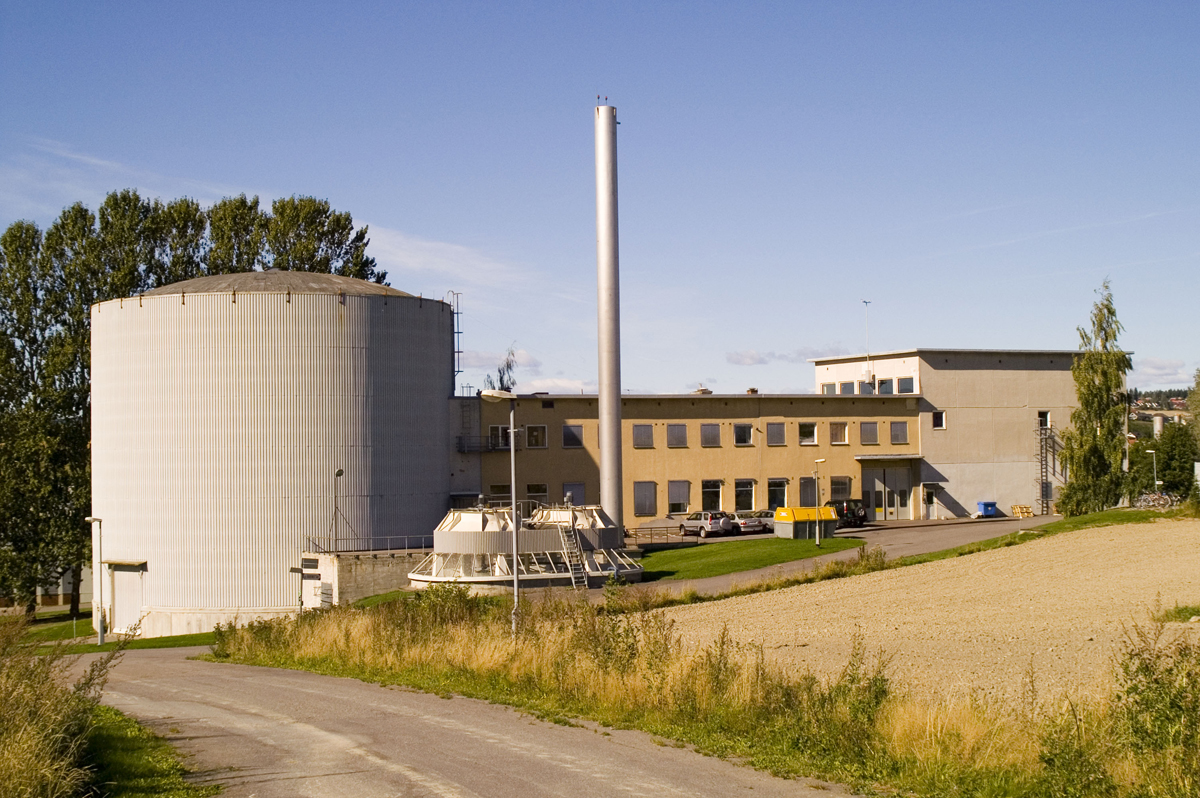
JEEP II reactor at Kjeller (Norway) is a research instrument for materials science and basic research in physics.

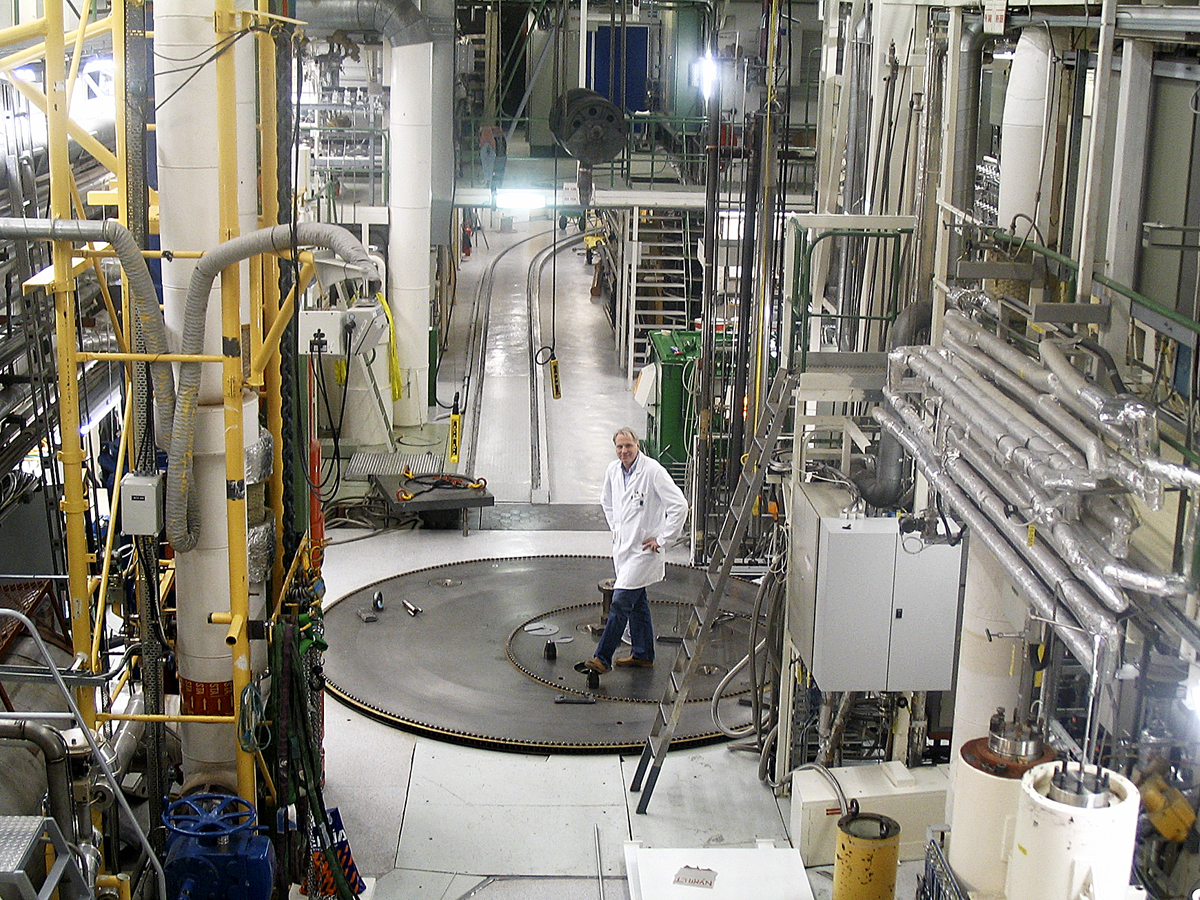
Halden-reaktoren was a research tool for i.a. reactor safety and fuel integrity.

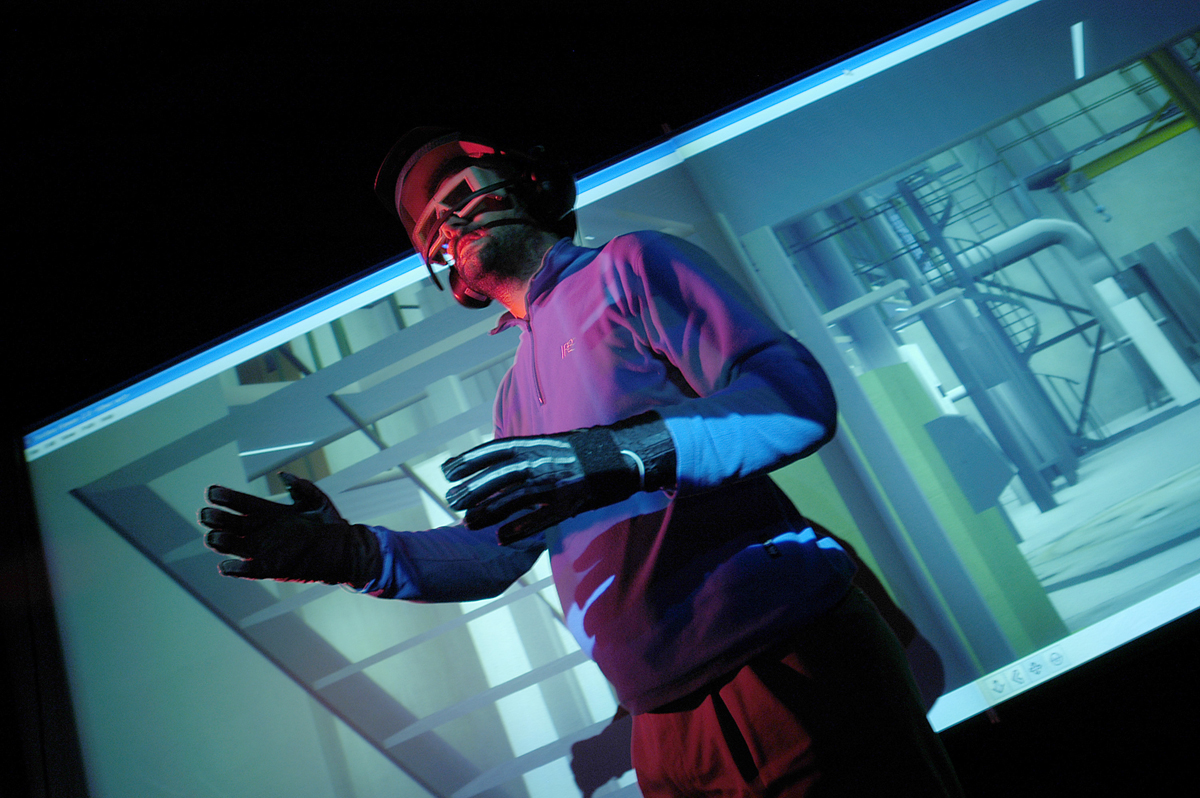
IFE has a Human-Centred Technologies section in Halden (Norway) with a special focus on applying augmented and virtual reality technology to meet energy industry needs

Institute for Energy Technology (IFE) is a Norwegian research institute. It was established in 1948 as the Institute for Nuclear Energy (IFA). The name was changed in 1980. Its main office is at Kjeller, Norway, and slightly under half of the institute’s activities are based in Halden. In Halden IFE is host to the international OECD Halden Reactor Project, with 18 member states.

IFE conducts research in the following areas: energy, environmental technology, physics, materials science, petroleum technology, nuclear safety and reliability and man-machine systems (man-technology-organisation).

In the 21st century, IFE operated the only two existing nuclear reactors in Norway. Both were dedicated to research. The JEEP II reactor at Kjeller was used for basic research in physics and material science, as well as production of radiopharmaceuticals. The Halden Reactor was used for research in materials technology and nuclear fuel safety. The reactor was transferred to Norwegian Nuclear Decommissioning on April 1. 2025

The Institute has approximately 600 employees in Halden and at Kjeller. The President is Nils Morten Huseby.

== History ==
During the post-war years Norway put strong efforts in the area of nuclear research. Gunnar Randers and Odd Dahl had already started the Norwegian nuclear research activities at the Norwegian Defence Research Establishment (FFI) from 1946, and after World War II this research was separated from the military establishment, with a focus on civilian use of nuclear power.

Institute for Nuclear Energy (IFA) was established in 1948 as a civilian offspring from the Norwegian Defence Research Establishment with Gunnar Randers as President until 1970.

Norway’s first nuclear reactor (JEEP or later, JEEP I) went into operation at Kjeller in 1951. It went critical for the first time June 30, 1951. At this time only the great powers in the world: United States, United Kingdom, France, the Soviet Union and Canada had managed to build and put nuclear reactors in operation.

In the 1980s IFE reformed its programme profile. Public financing was reduced, and in line with contemporary neo-liberal trends in society new demands were put on industry research, market adaptation and exposing research more to commercialisation. Research areas that saw a growth in this period included petroleum research, renewable energy, control room technology and man-machine-communication.

From the 1990s IFE gained a leading position in Norwegian energy- and environmental research, with focus on hydrogen storage in metal hydrides, environmental technology, energy systems analysis, solar energy and renewable energy systems.

In the area of petroleum technology, IFE has expertise in the areas of tracer technology, corrosion inhibition and multiphase flow assurance.

In the 2000s IFE has invested in the area of solar cell research. A new solar cell laboratory at Kjeller was opened in 2009, and cost about 50 million NOK, one of the biggest investments made by the Institute. The Centre for Environmental Energy Research hosted by IFE will concentrate on the development of silicon-based solar cells.

== Police report by Norway's foreign ministry ==
A 12 May 2013 article in O Estado de S. Paulo broke the story about testing done at the Halden Reactor in regards to the nuclear submarine program of Brazil. The testing did not have the proper authorization from Norway's government.

On 4 September, media said that the institute "is admitting to illegal cooperation with companies in four more countries:" Russia, Argentina, France and the United States. Later Norway's foreign ministry made a police report to PST.

== See also ==
- Halden Reactor
