= Pilestredet =

Street in Oslo, Norway

Coordinates: 59°55′04″N 10°44′18″E

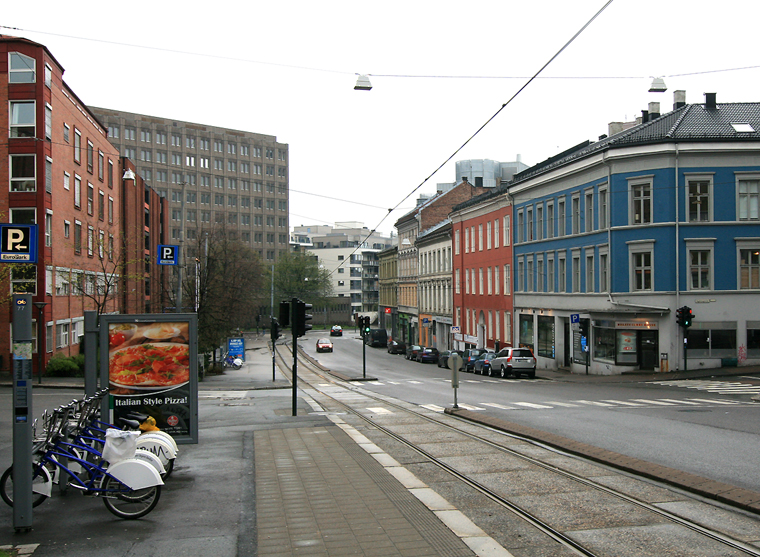
Pilestredet at Høyskolesenteret tram station in front of Oslo Metropolitan University

Pilestredet is a street in Oslo, Norway which begins in the city center and runs through the boroughs of St. Hanshaugen and Frogner.

The street was originally called Rakkerstrædet in reference to the city dump that was located along the road at today's Pilestredet Park. It was renamed in 1820 to Pilestrædveien because of all the willow trees along the road. According to historian Alf Collett the renaming came about after pressure from the Brochmann family, who did not want to live on a road named after rubbish. Rikshospitalet was located there earlier, now superseded by Pilestredet Park. Oslo Metropolitan University is found along the street, and the Ullevål Hageby tram line runs along parts of it. The Blitz movement is housed in Pilestredet 30. There are several churches along the street, including Fagerborg Church.

Industry in the street includes Conrad Langaard and St. Halvard Bryggeri.

The street is featured in the Norwegian version of the board game Monopoly, at the spot where North Carolina Avenue is found in the US version.
