= Halden Reactor =

Permanently shutdown nuclear reactor in Halden, Norway

Coordinates: 59.1269°N 11.4036°E

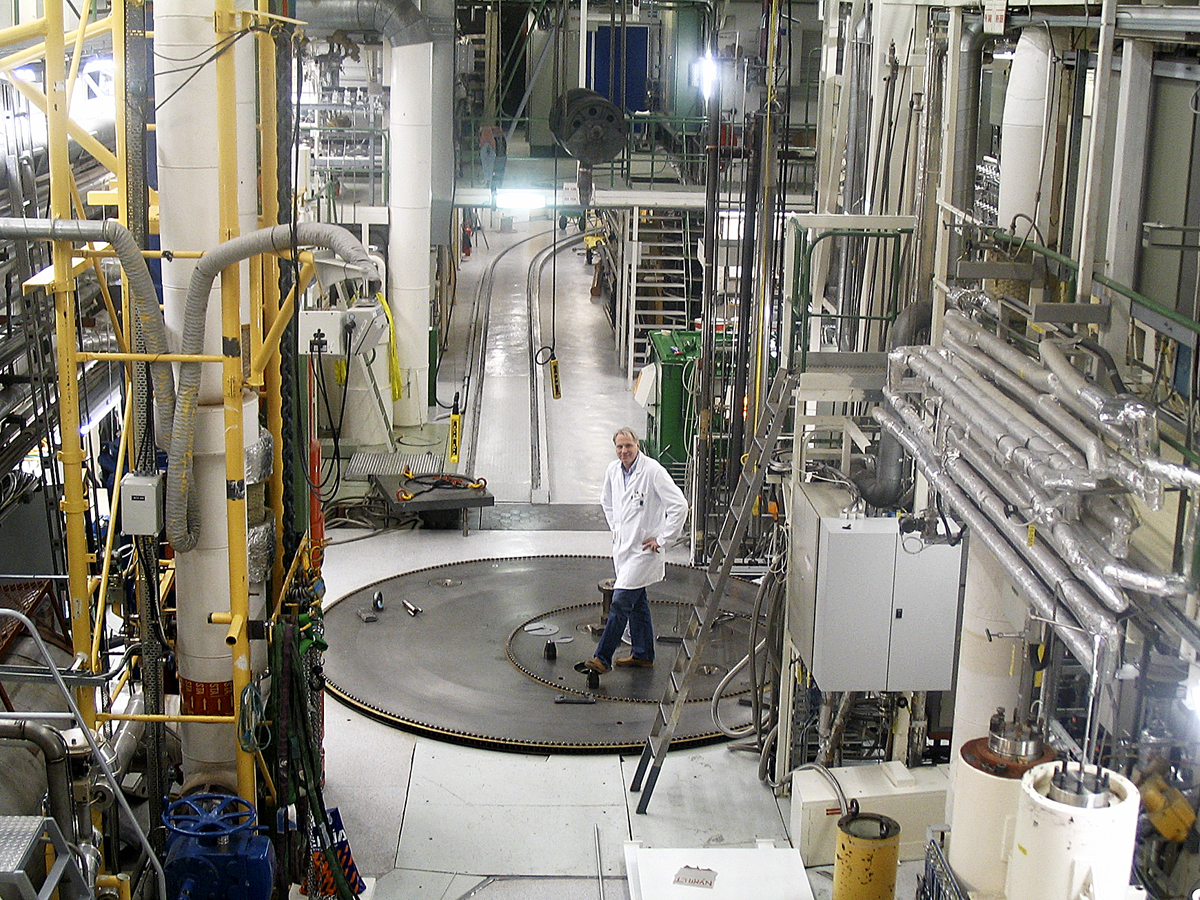
The reactor hall of the Halden Reactor

The Halden Reactor was a 25MW (thermal) nuclear reactor located in Halden, Norway and dedicated for research. Construction started 1955 and the reactor became operative in 1958 and was operated by the Institute for Energy Technology (IFE). The reactor was built into bedrock at 100 metres (330 ft) depth. The Halden Reactor was operational 1958–2018. The Halden Reactor was transferred to the state agency Norwegian Nuclear Decommissioning on 1 April 2025, for decommissioning.

In October 2016 media said that it was expected to close at the time, without saying what year it would reopen. In June 2018, the board of directors of Norway's Institute for Energy Technology (IFE) has decided to close the Halden Reactor permanently and to start its decommissioning. The board did not apply to extend its operating licence, which expired in 2020, and the reactor, which was at the time shut down due to a safety valve failure, was not restarted again. Because it was primarily a research reactor, steam production was driven by the research programme rather than demand from the paper factory (the consumer).

The reactor was a boiling heavy water reactor; it was moderated and cooled by heavy water in the primary circuit, producing heavy water steam. The heat was transferred to a closed light water secondary circuit, then to a tertiary system which delivered steam to a neighbouring paper factory The reactor was used for safety-focused research into materials, fuel burnup, and fuel behaviour in prolonged operating conditions in co-operation with organizations from 19 countries.

In 2019 IFE uncovered that research data had been falsified or manipulated at the Halden Reactor.

In August 2019 IFE started an investigation into alleged scientific misconduct in historic Halden Reactor projects involving the possible alterations of research results. Since 2016 IFE has worked to improve the safety culture and processes at Halden. An independent investigation found that the results of several nuclear fuel tests carried out between 1990 and 2005 had been fabricated, and the false results had been supplied to a number of nuclear organisations internationally.

In 2020 it was estimated dismantling the Halden and Kjeller research reactors and restoring the sites to unrestricted use will cost about NOK20 billion (US$2 billion) and take 20 to 25 years.

== Incidents ==
The research reactor suffered a small leakage of radioactive iodine on 24 October 2016 1:45 pm. No health risk or danger to the environment outside the facility was expected by the NRPA-authority. The reactor was already shut down at the time for routine maintenance.
