= Jan Grund =

Norwegian academic

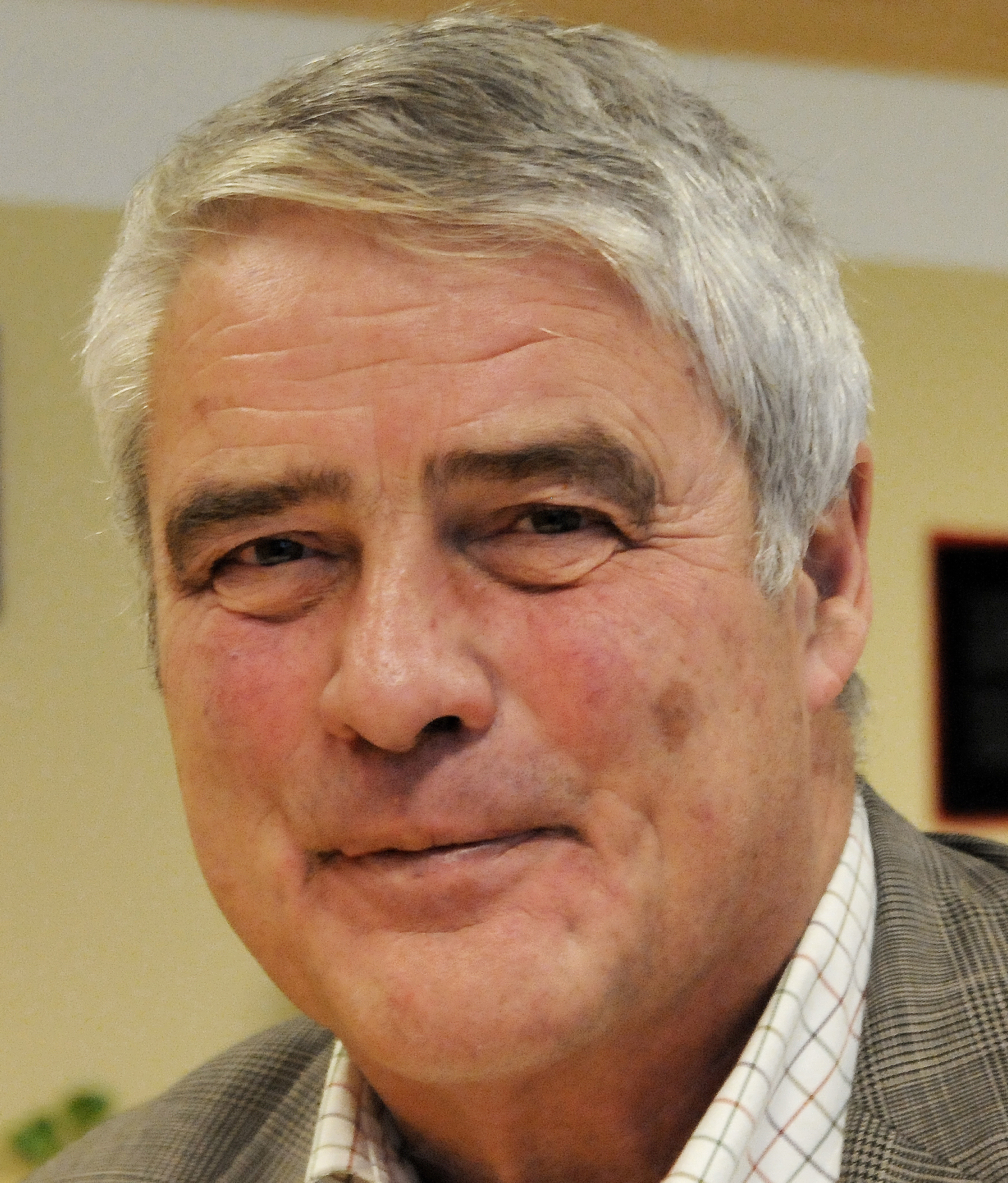
Jan Grund

Jan Grund (born 22 July 1946) is a Norwegian academic.

He graduated with the cand.oecon. degree in 1972. He was hired as rector of Akershus University College in December 2007, and assumed office in April 2008. He was formerly a professor of health administration at the Norwegian School of Management's Department of Public Governance. He has also been chair of Oslo Nye Teater and a member of the board of Oslo Kino and Black Box Teater.

He is a son of Inger Louise Valle. He is married, and lives in Ullern.

Academic offices
Preceded by Gyrid Garshol (acting)	Rector of Akershus University College; 2008–present	Incumbent
