= Kantar Sifo =

Swedish Market research company

Kantar Sifo, previously TNS Sifo and Sifo Research International, is a Swedish company operating in the field of opinion and social research.

Since 1967, Sifo has published its public opinion poll "Voter monitor" (Swedish: Väljarbarometern) which analyses the party allegiances of Swedish voters. Sifo is also known for one of the largest media surveys in the world – ORVESTO Konsument, for which almost 50 thousand people (out of total of 9 million citizens) are interviewed every year about their media and consumption patterns.

Kantar Sifo has its headquarters in Stockholm.

== History ==
The company was founded in 1954 as Svenska institutet för opinionsundersökningar ("the Swedish Institute for Opinion Surveys") and known by the public under the acronym Sifo. In 2000 the company was acquired by WPP and renamed Sifo Research International. After a merger with TNS Gallup in 2009, the company was named TNS Sifo. Since 2016 the company is known as Kantar Sifo.
