= Sifo Company =

American toy company

The Sifo Company (which did business as Sifo's Toys and The Sifo Novelty Company) was a maker of mainly wooden children's toys that was located in St. Paul, Minnesota.

Sifo's niche was early educational toys. Sifo catalogs of the period emphasized the various properties of their toys that would entertain and educate children. Their toys were largely made of wood, with the wood milled and rendered into parts at a facility in Norway, Michigan. Final assembly and finishing of the toys took place at the St. Paul headquarters and factory located at 353 Rosabel Street (now Wall Street).

Sifo's best known products were the Timmy Time Clock Children's game and the Kinder City city play set.

Sifo was in business from 1944 until 1975. The St. Paul factory was razed and replaced with a parking lot.
