= Oslo University College =

State university college in Norway

Coordinates: 59°55′18.73″N 10°44′0.26″E

- Høgskolen i Oslo
- Motto: OUC provides knowledge for a lifetime (translated from Norwegian)
- Type: State College
- Active: 1994–2011
- Rector: Sissel Østberg
- Administrative staff: 1100
- Students: 12,000
- Location: Oslo, Norway
- Successor institution: Oslo and Akershus University College
- Website: www.hio.no

Oslo University College (Norwegian: Høgskolen i Oslo; HiO) was the largest state university college in Norway from 1994 to 2011, with more than 18,000 students and approximately 1800 employees. Oslo University College merged with Akershus University College to form Oslo and Akershus University College in 2011, and this institution became Oslo Metropolitan University in 2018.

OUC was established on 1 August 1994 when the Norwegian college system was restructured and 18 smaller colleges in the Oslo area merged. From the 2000s most of the school was located in the city centre of Oslo along Pilestredet street. The main campus was the previous Frydenlund Brewery near Bislett stadium. OUC offered the broadest portfolio of professional studies available in Norway. The language of instruction was Norwegian.

== Faculties ==
- Faculty of Art, Design and Drama
- Faculty of Social Sciences
- Faculty of Education and International Studies
- Faculty of Engineering
- Faculty of Health Sciences
- Faculty of Journalism, Library and Information Science
- Faculty of Nursing

== Centres ==
- Centre for Educational Research and Development
- Centre for the Study of Professions
- National Centre for Multicultural Education
- Learning Centre
