= Akershus University College =

College in Norway

Coordinates: 59°58′30.38″N 11°2′55.23″E

- Høgskolen i Akershus
- Established: 1 August 1994
- Rector: Jan Grund
- Administrative staff: 300
- Students: 3,900
- Location: Kjeller, Norway

Akershus University College (Norwegian: Høgskolen i Akershus, HiAk) was a university college located in Kjeller, Norway. The institution is one of 25 public university colleges owned and run by the Norwegian state. It last had about 3,900 students and a staff of approximately 300. It merged with Oslo University College on 1 August 2011 to create Oslo and Akershus University College.

The college was divided into four faculties:

- Faculty of Nursing Education
- Faculty of Product Design
- Faculty of Social Education
- Faculty of Technical and Vocational Teacher Education
