= Kjeller =

Coordinates: 59°59′N 11°02′E

- Village
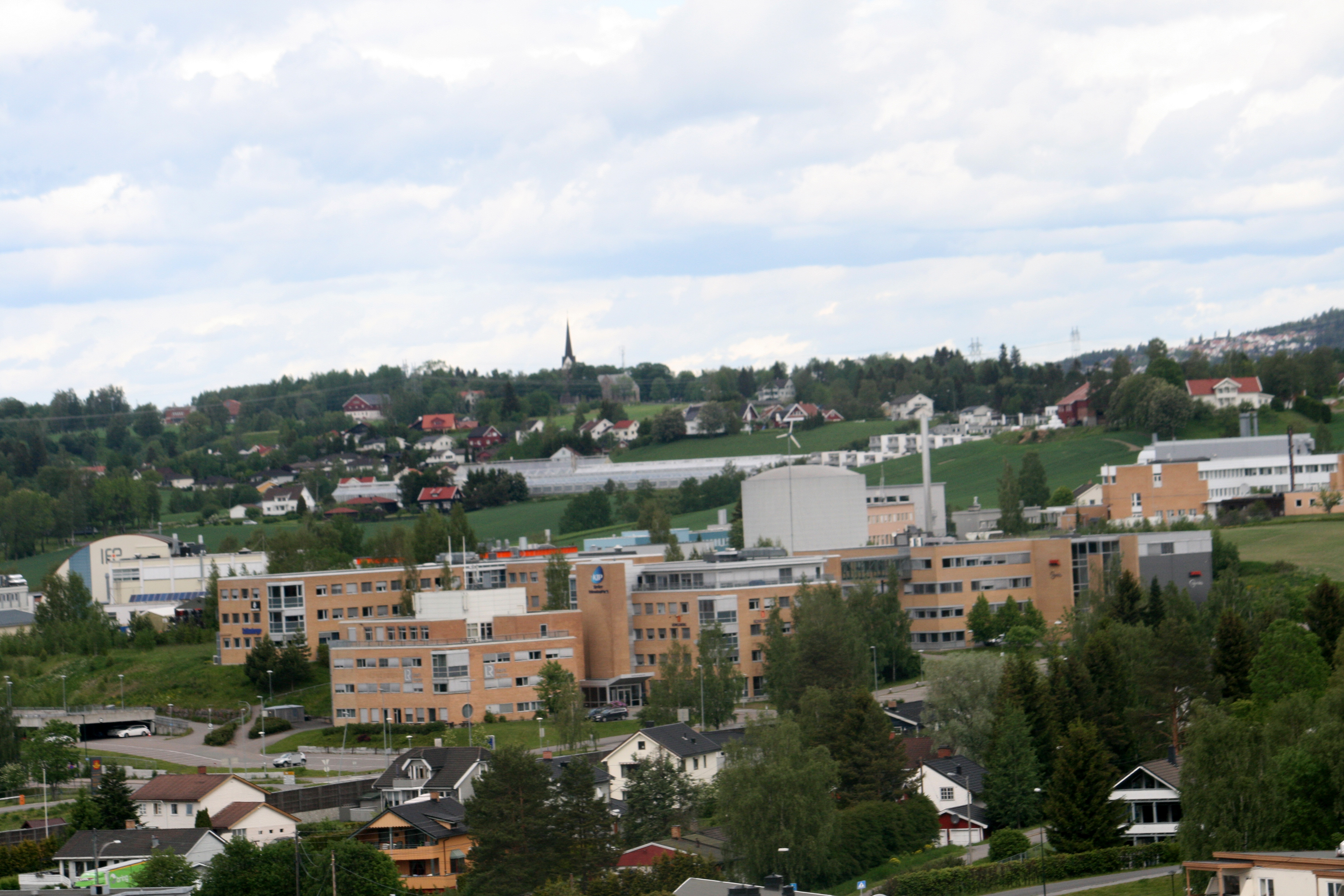

- Location in Akershus
- Country: Norway
- Region: Østlandet
- County: Akershus
- Time zone: UTC+01:00 (CET)
  - Summer (DST): UTC+02:00 (CEST)

Kjeller is a village located near Lillestrøm in the municipality of Lillestrøm, Norway. It is located 25 kilometers north-east of Oslo.

== Name ==
The Norse form of the name was probably Tjaldir. This is then the plural of tjald n 'tent'. The hills around the farm (Kjellerhaugen and others) might have been compared in form with tents.

== Facilities ==
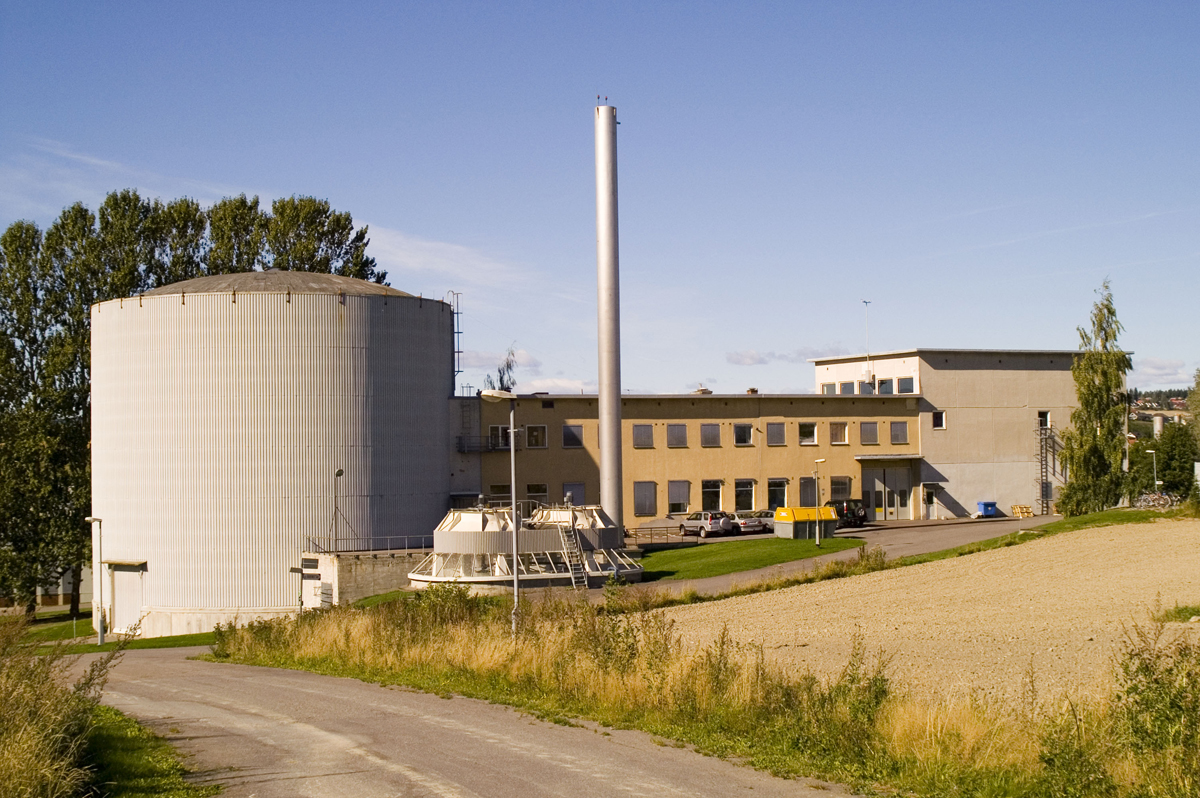
JEEP II reactor at Kjeller (Norway) is a research instrument for materials science and basic research in physics.

Kjeller contains:

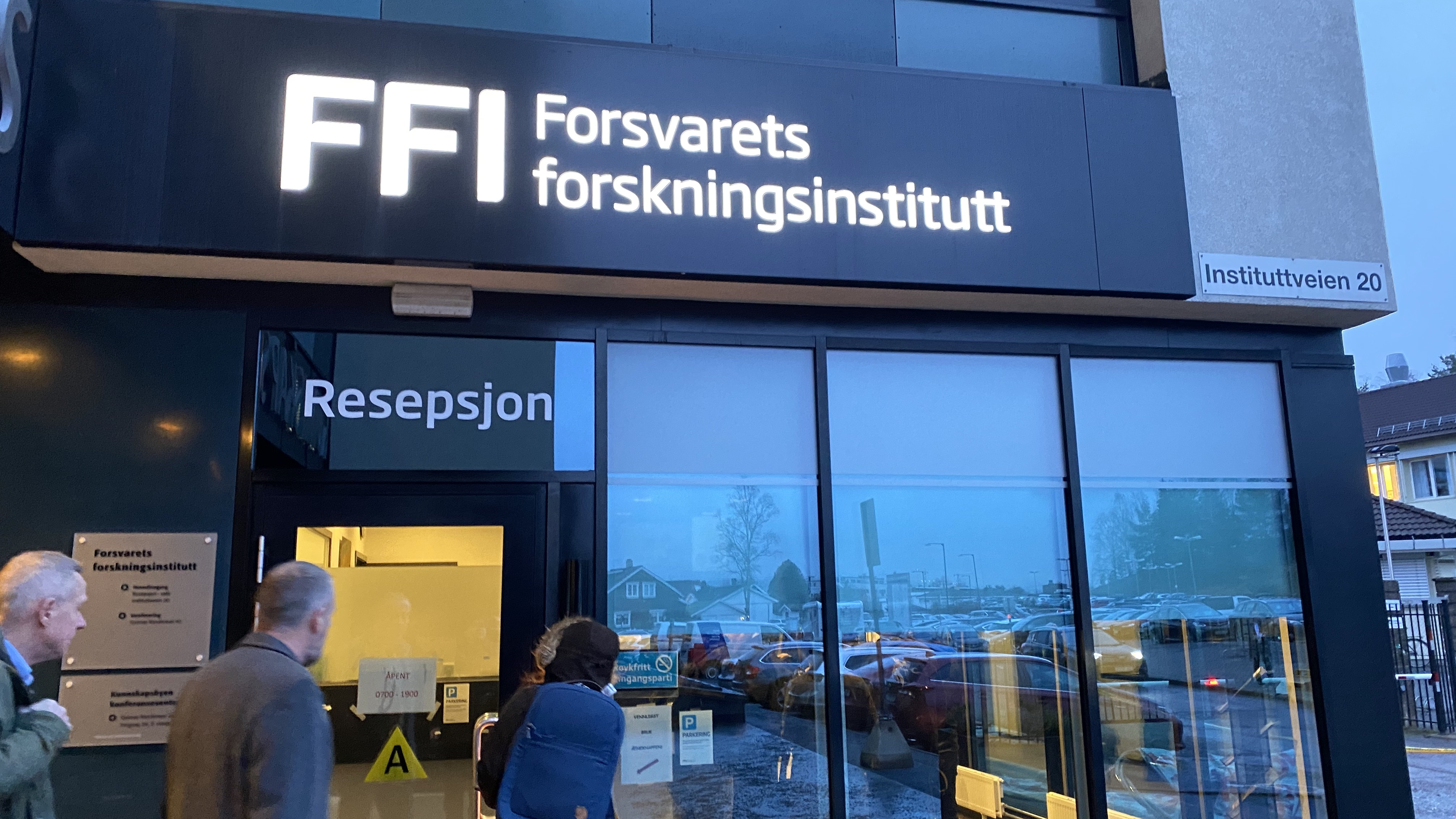
FFI in Kjeller, Norway

- Kjeller Airport
- Norwegian Defence Logistic Organization (FLO)
- The Norwegian Defence Research Establishment (FFI)
- The Institute for Energy Technology (IFE), including one of Norway's two nuclear research reactors.
- Norwegian Institute for Air Research
- The Norwegian Standardisation Bureau
- UNIK (University Graduate Center)
- Oslo Metropolitan University
- NORSAR (Norwegian Seismic Array)

Historically, Kjeller has also been the location for a small aircraft factory. The Telenor Research Centre was located in Kjeller until 2001, when the majority of employees moved to Fornebu on 23 November. Akershus University College was opened in autumn 2003 at Telenor's previous location. Approximately 3700 students attend the university.

The array at NORSAR was one of the first European nodes of the ARPANET, the precursor to the Internet.

=== Nuclear reactor ===
The nuclear reactor at Kjeller, opened on November 28, 1951 was the first reactor outside the US, Soviet Union, Canada, Great Britain and France. It was a joint project by the Dutch and Norwegian governments. The Netherlands supplied the uranium and Norway the heavy water. The nuclear reactor is used in scientific research and is together with a nuclear reactor in Halden Norway's only two nuclear reactors. Neither of them is in commercial use.

On 9 September 2006, the reactor suffered a "contained" leak which forced it to shut down for three weeks for repairs.

Its operating license expires at the end of 2018. In 2020 it was estimated dismantling the Halden and Kjeller research reactors and restoring the sites to unrestricted use will cost about NOK20 billion (US$2 billion) and take 20 to 25 years.
