= Norwegian Institute for Urban and Regional Research =

Norwegian research institute

The Norwegian Institute for Urban and Regional Research (Norwegian: Norsk institutt for by- og regionforskning, NIBR) is a social science research institute based in Oslo, Norway.

== History ==
It is a part of the Oslo Centre for Interdisciplinary Environmental and Social Research cooperative umbrella organization. Its purpose is to conduct "studies which promote society's ability to tackle environmental and social development challenges".

The current director general of the institute is Dr. Hilde Lorentzen.

== Departments ==
NIBR has four departments:

- Dept. for Housing and Environmental Planning Research
- Dept. for International Studies in Development, Transition and Migration
- Dept. for Socioeconomic and Territorial Studies
- Dept. for Welfare, Democracy and Governance Research
