= National Institute for Consumer Research =

Norwegian research institute

The National Institute for Consumer Research (Norwegian: Statens institutt for forbruksforskning, SIFO) is a consumer affairs research institute based in Oslo, Norway. It has researchers in both social and natural sciences.

Albeit non-biased, it is not organizationally independent, as it is subordinate to the Norwegian Ministry of Children and Family Affairs, who appoints its board of directors and provides the funding.

The institute has 55 employees. It is divided into three departments; Consumption and Economy, Technology and Environment, and Market and Politics. The current director general is Arne Dulsrud; the director of research is Eivind Stø.

== Directors ==
- Tormod K. Lunde 1990-1997
- Reidar Skaug
- Anne Moxnes Jervell
- Sigrun Vågeng 2013-2015
- Arne Dulsrud 2015-
