= Fridtjof Nansen Prize for Outstanding Research =

Norwegian research award

The Fridtjof Nansen Prize for Outstanding Research (Norwegian: Fridtjof Nansens belønning for fremragende forskning) is a Norwegian research award. It is conferred by the Nansen Trust and its associated trusts, and it was established in 1896 after the return of the Fram Expedition.

The prize is awarded in two categories: a historical-philosophical award, first conferred in 1903, and a mathematical–natural science award, first conferred in 1907. The prize is NOK 150,000. Since 2003, recipients of the Fridtjof Nansen Prize for Outstanding Research have also been awarded the Nansen Medal for Outstanding Research.

== Recipients ==
=== Historical-philosophical category ===
The following people have received the Fridtjof Nansen Prize for Outstanding Research in the historical-philosophical category:

- 1903 Hjalmar Falk, linguist
- 1903 Alf Torp, philologist
- 1905 Wilhelm Schencke, religious historian
- 1906 Olaf Broch, linguist
- 1909 Sten Konow, philologist
- 1910 Jørgen Alexander Knudtzon, linguist
- 1911 Christen Collin, literary historian
- 1912 Gerhard Gran, literary historian
- 1913 Haakon Shetelig, archaeologist
- 1914 Marius Hægstad, linguist
- 1915 Anton Wilhelm Brøgger, archaeologist
- 1916 Samson Eitrem, philologist
- 1917 Hans E. Kinck, philologist
- 1917 Arnold Ræstad, legal scholar
- 1918 Alexander Bugge, historian
- 1919 Anders Nicolai Kiær, statistician
- 1920 Fredrik Stang, legal scholar
- 1921 Nikolaus Gjelsvik, legal scholar
- 1921 Just Knud Qvigstad, philologist
- 1922 Magnus Olsen, linguist
- 1922 Tord Pedersen, historian
- 1923 Amund B. Larsen, linguist
- 1924 Sigmund Mowinckel, theologian
- 1925 Halvdan Koht, historian
- 1926 Ivar Kleiven, historian
- 1927 Holger Sinding-Larsen, architect
- 1928 Konrad Nielsen, philologist
- 1929 Gunnar Rudberg, philologist
- 1930 Carl Marstrander, linguist
- 1931 Paul Olaf Bodding, linguist
- 1931 Jon Skeie, legal scholar
- 1932 Johannes Bøe, archaeologist
- 1932 Didrik Arup Seip, linguist
- 1933 Torstein Høverstad, historian
- 1934 Fredrik Paasche, literary historian
- 1936 Ragnar Knoph, legal scholar
- 1936 Simen Skappel, historian
- 1937 Oscar Albert Johnsen, historian
- 1938 Erik Krag, literary historian
- 1939 Knut Liestøl, folklore specialist
- 1941 Hans Peter L'Orange, art historian
- 1942 Reidar Thoralf Christiansen, folklore specialist
- 1943 Asgaut Steinnes, historian
- 1944 Rolv Thesen, literary critic
- 1945 Georg Morgenstierne, linguist
- 1946 Ingjald Reichborn-Kjennerud, dentist
- 1947 Theodor Petersen, archaeologist
- 1948 Nils Lid, ethnologist
- 1949 Francis Bull, literary historian
- 1950 Andreas Hofgaard Winsnes, literary historian
- 1951 Arne Bergsgård, historian
- 1952 Ragnvald Iversen, linguist
- 1953 Johan Schreiner, historian
- 1954 Knut Hermundstad, folklore specialist
- 1955 Ingerid Dal, linguist
- 1956 Jens Arup Seip, historian
- 1957 Carl Jacob Arnholm, legal scholar
- 1958 Christian Schweigaard Stang, linguist
- 1959 Anne Holtsmark, philologist
- 1960 Øystein Vesaas, art historian
- 1961 Einar Molland, church historian
- 1962 Egil Sæther, geologist
- 1963 Sverre Steen, historian
- 1964 Johs. Andenæs, legal scholar
- 1965 Dorothea Stoud Fischer, art historian
- 1965 Gerhard Fischer, architect
- 1966 Ole Mørk Sandvik, musicologist
- 1967 Hans Vogt, linguist
- 1968 Leiv Amundsen, philologist
- 1968 Eiliv Skard, philologist
- 1969 Ludvig Holm-Olsen, philologist
- 1969 Hallvard Lie, philologist
- 1970 Einar Haugen, linguist
- 1971 Erling Johansen, archaeologist
- 1972 Lars Østby, demographer
- 1974 Sjur Brækhus, legal scholar
- 1974 Torstein Eckhoff, legal scholar
- 1975 Arvid S. Kapelrud, theologian
- 1976 Per Nyquist Grøtvedt, philologist
- 1977 Andreas Holmsen, historian
- 1978 Edvard Beyer, literary historian
- 1979 Trygve Haavelmo, economist
- 1979 Leif Johansen, economist
- 1981 Paulus Svendsen, literary historian
- 1982 Lilli Gjerløw, archivist
- 1983 Arne Næss, philosopher
- 1984 Ingrid Semmingsen, historian
- 1985 Thor Heyerdahl, ethnographer
- 1985 Anne Stine Ingstad, archaeologist
- 1985 Helge Ingstad, explorer
- 1986 Daniel Haakonsen, literary historian
- 1987 Helge Julius Jakhelln Dyvik, linguist
- 1988 Carsten Smith, legal scholar
- 1988 Magnus Aarbakke, legal scholar
- 1989 Johan P. Olsen, political scientist
- 1990 Henry Henne, linguist
- 1991 Knut Mykland, historian
- 1992 Even Hovdhaugen, linguist
- 1993 Kjell Venås, philologist
- 1994 Ottar Grønvik, philologist
- 1994 Kristian Smidt, literary historian
- 1995 Magne Sæbø, biblical scholar
- 1996 Thor Falkanger, legal scholar
- 1997 Knut Bergsland, linguist
- 1998 Helge Nordahl, philologist
- 1999 Hjalmar Torp, archaeologist
- 2000 Cathrine Fabricius-Hansen, linguist
- 2001 Nils Christie, sociologist
- 2001 Knut Helle, historian
- 2002 Helge Pharo, historian
- 2003 Dagfinn Føllesdal, philosopher
- 2004 Hans M. Barstad, theologian
- 2005 Fredrik Barth, anthropologist
- 2006 Jon Elster, social theorist
- 2007 Svein J. Magnussen, psychologist
- 2008 Christoph Harbsmeier, sinologist
- 2009 Agnar Sandmo and Victor D. Norman, economists
- 2010 Peter Svenonius, linguist
- 2011 Eyjólfur Kjalar Emilsson, philosopher
- 2012 Ernst Håkon Jahr, linguist
- 2013 no award
- 2014 Michael Schulte, linguist
- 2015 no award
- 2016 Kalle Moene, economist
- 2017 no award
- 2018 Egil Kraggerud, philologist

=== Mathematical–natural science category ===
The following people have received the Fridtjof Nansen Prize for Outstanding Research in the mathematical–natural science category:

- 1906 Johan Aschehoug Kiær, paleontologist
- 1907 Roald Amundsen, polar explorer
- 1908 Vilhelm Bjerknes, physicist
- 1908 Kristian Birkeland, physicist
- 1909 Mikael Heggelund Foslie, botanist
- 1910 Johan Hjort, marine biologist
- 1910 Carl Størmer, geologist
- 1911 Johan Herman Lie Vogt, geologist
- 1912 Victor Goldschmidt, chemist
- 1913 Axel Thue, mathematician
- 1914 Henrik Mohn, meteorologist
- 1915 Bjørn Helland-Hansen, oceanographer
- 1916 Francis Harbitz, anatomist
- 1916 Olaf Holtedahl, geologist
- 1917 Kristian Emil Schreiner, anatomist
- 1918 Axel Holst, physician
- 1918 Nordal Wille, botanist
- 1919 Haaken Hasberg Gran, botanist
- 1919 Hjalmar August Schiøtz, ophthalmologist
- 1919 Søren Holth, ophthalmologist
- 1920 Ellen Gleditsch, chemist
- 1922 Richard Birkeland, mathematician
- 1923 Peter Fredrik Holst, physician
- 1924 Hans Christian Geelmuyden, medical specialist
- 1924 Heinrich Jacob Goldschmidt, chemist
- 1925 Jens Fredrik Schroeter, astronomer
- 1926 Sigurd Einbu, astronomer
- 1927 Claus Nissen Riiber, chemist
- 1928 Birger Meidell, mathematician
- 1929 Svein Rosseland, astronomer
- 1930 Otto Lous Mohr, geneticist
- 1932 Carl Fredrik Holmboe, mechanical engineer
- 1933 Knud Magnus Haaland, medical specialist
- 1933 Bernt Arne Lynge, botanist
- 1934 Lars Vegard, physicist
- 1935 Kristine Bonnevie, botanist
- 1935 Eugen Jørgensen, botanist
- 1937 Halvor Solberg, meteorologist
- 1938 Thoralf Skolem, mathematician
- 1939 Viggo Brun, mathematician
- 1940 August Brinkmann, zoologist
- 1940 Knut Dahl, zoologist
- 1941 Oscar Hagem, botanist
- 1942 Torbjørn Gaarder, chemist
- 1943 Emil Korsmo, botanist
- 1944 Egil Hylleraas, physicist
- 1945 Jonas Fjeldstad, oceanographer
- 1946 Olaf Hassel, astronomer
- 1947 Rolf Nordhagen, botanist
- 1948 Christen Finbak, chemist
- 1949 Ivar Asbjørn Følling, biochemist
- 1950 Theodor Thjøtta, bacteriologist
- 1951 Harald Wergeland, physicist
- 1952 Alf Brodal, anatomist
- 1953 Ivar Jørstad, botanist
- 1954 Nils Andreas Sørensen, chemist
- 1955 Jan B. Jansen, anatomist
- 1956 Einar Lea, marine biologist
- 1957 Håkon Flood, physicist
- 1959 Endre Berner, chemist
- 1959 Bjørn Føyn, zoologist
- 1960 Odd Hassel, chemist
- 1960 Ragnar Nicolaysen, nutrition specialist
- 1961 Olav Foss, chemist
- 1962 Otto Bastiansen, chemist
- 1963 Leiv Kreyberg, anatomist
- 1964 Erik Waaler, pathologist
- 1965 Sven Furberg, biologist
- 1966 Leif Størmer, geologist
- 1967 Birger Kaada, physician
- 1968 Carl Semb, surgeon
- 1969 Johan Peter Holtsmark, physicist
- 1970 Lorentz Eldjarn, physician
- 1971 Ivan Th. Rosenqvist, geologist
- 1972 Per Andersen, brain researcher
- 1973 Jens Lothe, physicist
- 1974 Fredrik Kiil, physician
- 1975 Raphael Høegh-Krohn, mathematician
- 1976 Georg Waaler, physician
- 1977 Anton Eliassen, meteorologist
- 1977 Ragnar Fjørtoft, meteorologist
- 1978 Rolf Yngvar Berg, botanist
- 1979 Arne Løvlie, zoologist
- 1980 Alexis Pappas, chemist
- 1980 Lars Skattebøl, chemist
- 1980 Axel Sømme, geographer
- 1981 Terje Lømo, physiologist
- 1982 Knut Fægri, botanist
- 1983 Roald Tangen, physicist
- 1983 Sverre Westin, physicist
- 1984 Christian Peskine, mathematician
- 1984 Nils Christian Stenseth, biologist
- 1985 John Ugelstad, chemist
- 1986 Arne Semb-Johansson, zoologist
- 1987 Theodor Blackstad, brain researcher
- 1987 Fred Walberg, physician
- 1988 Olav Sand, physiologist
- 1989 Kaj Grjotheim, chemist
- 1990 Jens Feder, physicist
- 1990 Torstein Jøssang, physicist
- 1991 Jon Bremer, physician
- 1992 Lars Walløe, cybernetics specialist
- 1993 Jon Magne Leinaas, physicist
- 1993 Jan Myrheim, physicist
- 1994 Arnoldus Schytte Blix, zoologist
- 1995 Bjørg Cyvin, physicist
- 1995 Sven Josef Cyvin, physicist
- 1996 Bernt Øksendal, mathematician
- 1997 Jan K. S. Jansen, physiologist
- 1998 John Birks, biologist
- 1998 John Gray, marine biologist
- 2000 Kjell B. Døving, physiologist
- 2000 Olav Smidsrød, chemist
- 2001 Sjur Refsdal, astrophysicist
- 2001 Jon Storm-Mathisen, anatomist
- 2002 Knut Aukland, physiologist
- 2003 Per Brandtzæg, pathologist
- 2004 Ola Bratteli, mathematician
- 2005 Hans Prydz, physician
- 2006 Tore Slagsvold, zoologist
- 2007 Ola M. Johannessen, oceanographer
- 2008 Trond Berg, biologist
- 2009 Idun Reiten, mathematician
- 2010 Bjørn Jamtveit, geologist
- 2011 Odd Magnus Faltinsen, mathematician
- 2012 Ludvig Sollid, physician
- 2013 May-Britt Moser and Edvard I. Moser, medical specialists
- 2014 Kirsten Sandvig, biochemist
- 2015 Anne-Lise Børresen-Dale, biochemist
- 2016 no award
- 2017 Trond Helge Torsvik, geophysicist
- 2018 no award
- 2019 Trygve Ulf Helgaker, theoretical chemist
