= Hans Peter L'orange =

Hans Peter L'orange may refer to:

- Hans Peter L'orange (officer) (1835–1907), Norwegian military officer
- Hans Peter L'Orange (academic) (1903–1983), Norwegian art historian and classical archaeologist, a paternal grandson of Hans Peter L'Orange (officer)
