= Jan K. S. Jansen =

Norwegian physiologist (1931–2011)

Jan Kristian Schøning Jansen (16 January 1931 – 8 January 2011) was a Norwegian physiologist.

He was born in Oslo as a son of professor of medicine Jan Birger Jansen (1898–1984) and Helene Sofie Schøning (1902–1976). He was married to Lisbeth Bjørneby from 1954 to 1974 and to Helen Troye from 1981.

He finished his secondary education at Berg Upper Secondary School in 1949 and studied at the University of Oslo under his father and Birger Kaada. He specialized in neurophysiology. His early research focused on afferent impulses to the cerebellar hemispheres from the cerebral cortex and subcortical nuclei, using electro-anatomical studies in cats. He took the cand.med. degree in 1955, and in 1957 he took the dr.med. degree with the thesis Afferent impulses to the cerebellar hemispheres from the cerebral cortex and certain subcortical nuclei. An electro-anatomical study in the cat. In 1959 he started studies at the University Laboratory of Physiology in Oxford. He won the Andres Jahre Prize for Young Researchers together with Per Andersen in 1967. He was hired as a docent at the University of Oslo in 1968, worked under Stephen Kuffler and John Nicholls at Harvard University from 1969 to 1970, and was a professor at the University of Oslo from 1979 to 1995. He was a member of the Norwegian Academy of Science and Letters from 1977, and chairman of the Nansen Fund.

Awards
Preceded by Bernt Øksendal	Recipient of the Fridtjof Nansen Excellent Research Award in Science; 1997	Succeeded by John Birks; John Stuart Gray
