= John S. Gray =

John S. Gray may refer to:

- John S. Gray (Idaho politician) (1833–1891), Idaho Lieutenant Governor and politician
- John S. Gray (businessman) (1841–1906), candymaker, businessman, and first president of Ford Motor Company
- John Stuart Gray (1941–2007), British-Norwegian marine biologist

== See also ==
- John Gray (disambiguation)
