= Biagini =

Biagini is an Italian surname. Notable people with the surname include:

- Eugenio Biagini (born 1958), Italian historian
- Francesca Biagini (born 1973), Italian-German mathematician
- Greg Biagini (1952–2003), American player, coach and manager in minor league baseball
- Isabella Biagini (1943–2018), Italian actress and showgirl
- Joe Biagini (born 1990), American professional baseball pitcher
- Leonardo Biagini (born 1977), Argentine retired footballer
- Luca Biagini (born 1949), Italian actor and voice actor
