= Peter Bastiansen =

Peter Bastiansen may refer to:

- Peter Bastiansen (politician) (1912–1995), Norwegian communist politician
- Peter Bastiansen (tennis) (born 1962), Danish professional tennis player
