= Carl With =

Carl With may refer to:

- Carl Johannes With (1877–1923), Danish doctor and arachnologist
- Carl Georg With (1827–1908), Norwegian military officer
