= Jens Feder =

Norwegian physicist (1939–2019)

Gottfried Jens Feder (31 January 1939 – 15 February 2019) was a Norwegian physicist.

He was born in Munich, Germany but moved to live in Oslo in 1947. Following his graduation in physics, he received a NATO fellowship to study phase transitions and superconductors in Orsay, France (1965–66). He then joined IBM Zürich Research in Switzerland (1966–68) to study phase transitions in perovskites.

He was awarded a dr.philos. degree in 1970 by the University of Oslo where, and after spending two years as a lecturer, he was appointed professor of physics, only 35 years old. His research fields were broad and varied, including condensed matter physics, fluid dynamics, complex systems, and geophysics. He cooperated closely with physicist Torstein Jøssang, but also with colleagues worldwide. He spent sabbaticals at the IBM T.J. Watson Research Center in Yorktown Heights, New York (1972–73), at General Electric Research Laboratory in Schenectady, New York (1978–79), as the Williams Otis Crosby lecturer of geology at MIT (1997), at the Isaac Newton Institute for Mathematical Sciences in Cambridge, UK, and at Imperial College London (1999).

His book Fractals (Plenum, 1988) was translated into several languages, including Chinese, Japanese and Russian.

He was elected a fellow of the Norwegian Academy of Science and Letters in 1988 and a Fellow of the American Physical Society in 1989 "for contributions to theories and experiments on structural phase transitions and on fractals in aggregates and in porous media".

He resided at Slemdal and was married to Liv Feder and they had two children.

Awards
Preceded by Kaj Grjotheim	Recipient of the Fridtjof Nansen Excellent Research Award in Science; 1990 (with Torstein Jøssang)	Succeeded by Jon Bremer
