= Eberson =

Eberson is a surname. Notable people with the surname include:

- John Eberson (1875–1954), Ukrainian American architect
- Jon Eberson (born 1953), Norwegian jazz guitarist and composer
- Lennart Eberson, (1933–2000), Swedish chemist
- Marte Eberson, Norwegian keyboardist and composer

== See also ==
- Ebberston
