= Acta Chemica Scandinavica =

Peer-reviewed scientific journal

- Discipline: Chemistry
- Language: English, German, French

Publication details
- History: 1947–1999
- Publisher: Danish Chemical Society, Finnish Chemical Societies, Norwegian Chemical Society, Swedish Chemical Society

Standard abbreviations
- ISO 4: Acta Chem. Scand.

Indexing
- Acta Chemica Scandinavica (1947–1973)
- CODEN: ACSAA4
- ISSN: 0001-5393
- Acta Chemica Scandinavica, Series A: Physical and Inorganic Chemistry (1974–1988)
- CODEN: ACAPCT
- ISSN: 0302-4377
- Acta Chemica Scandinavica, Series B: Organic Chemistry and Biochemistry (1974–1988)
- CODEN: ACBOCV
- ISSN: 0302-4369
- Acta Chemica Scandinavica (1989–1999)
- CODEN: ACHSE7
- ISSN: 0904-213X

Links
- Journal homepage

Acta Chemica Scandinavica was a peer-reviewed Nordic scientific journal in the fields of chemistry. The journal was established in 1947 and was jointly managed during 53 years from beginning of 1947 until the end of 1999 by the chemical societies in Denmark (The Danish Chemical Society), Finland (Finnish Chemical Societies), Norway (The Norwegian Chemical Society), and Sweden (The Swedish Chemical Society). The journal was jointly owned by the four chemical societies through the Publishing Association Acta Chemica Scandinavica. The Swedish Chemical Society managed the administration of the Publishing Association at their secretariat in Stockholm.

When making citations or references to articles in Acta Chemica Scandinavica the abbreviation Acta Chem. Scand. is used.

== Background ==
During the turbulent years after World War II, it was difficult for Nordic scientists to publish results from fundamental chemical research in magazines with international recognition. The two Danish societies Danish Chemical Society and the Danish Society for Analytical Chemistry, where the latter society at that time was an independent society, were planning to establish a journal Acta Chemica Danica. This was never realised, but when the Swedish Chemical Society during 1946 sent out an enquiry to the other Nordic countries for a co-operation in publishing a new scientific journal, the Danes were well prepared and immediately positive. Thus, the first issue of Acta Chemica Scandinavica was published in January 1947. Gradually, the magazine became an internationally recognized scientific journal in the fields of physical, inorganic and organic chemistry and also in biochemistry.

== Publication coverage ==
The journal was published as one volume per year starting with Volume 1 in 1947. Thus, the last volume for 1999 became Volume 53. During the first 27 years (1947–1973) each volume consisted of 10 issues.

Following from the growing appreciation of the journal and the growing number of articles received, it was decided to split the journal into two series. Thus, from 1974 until 1988, two separate series were issued for the journal:

- Acta Chemica Scandinavica Ser. A (physical and inorganic chemistry)
- Acta Chemica Scandinavica Ser. B (organic chemistry and biochemistry)

Also for the last 11 volumes (1989–1999) the journal was issued as two separate series, but then in common issues. Due to these combined editions from 1989, these issues were given a new format.

In total, the 53 volumes include 16,632 scientific articles (including "short communications") and the total number of pages is 102,640. Today, all articles from Acta Chemica Scandinavica are available for free for scientists and interested persons globally.

Acta Chemica Scandinavica only accepted articles from Nordic (including Icelandic) chemists or scientists including foreign visiting scientists that were working in the Nordic countries. The manuscripts written in English, French or German were submitted to national editorial committees with representatives appointed by the chemical society in respective country. The editors accepted or rejected the manuscripts and submitted them to the main editor, Karl Myrbäck in Stockholm, who finally decided whether a manuscript would be accepted or not. From 1974 also peer reviewing was introduced. The Editorial Secretary and a small secretariat were carrying out the technical editing, proofreading, linguistic corrections, offprints, invoicing and bookkeeping. The printing was made by Frenckell's printing house in Helsinki and all distribution by Munksgaard's publishing house in Copenhagen.

Already from the beginning, the economy was tight and based on paid subscription fees and contributions from the four chemical societies.

== Publishing Association and Publishing Corporation ==
In the beginning the work for the journal was carried out with no remuneration to editors since this work was considered as part of regular scientific activities for those involved. When the size of the journal grew, this situation became untenable. A certain economic assistance was received from the Swedish Scientific Research Council (Naturvetenskapliga forskningsrådet, NFR) in Sweden and when the Swedish Chemical Society in 1961 moved to Wenner-Gren Center in Stockholm, the Journal got its own offices connected with the Society. At this time, the Swedish Chemical Society proposed that the four chemical societies should establish the Publishing Association Acta Chemica Scandinavica that would become responsible for the technical editorial office and become employer for the staff. In this way the four chemical societies became common owners of the Publishing Association and each society appointed one board member each.

A degree of voluntary contributions remained in the way that neither editors, nor board or editorial committees, received remuneration for work carried out.

During 1973, the Swedish Chemical Society and the Publishing Association moved to Wallingatan 24 in Stockholm, where the Chemical Society still resides.

During the 1960s and 1970s the journal grew in volume as well as in number of subscribers and the Board of the Publishing Association realised that the four participating chemical societies could not assume the increasing economic risk that the journal came to represent to them. In this situation one decided to establish a shareholding corporation or a limited company Acta Chemica Scandinavica Aktiebolag with the Publishing Association as the only shareholder. The first business year for this company was 1975.

However, during the middle of the 1980s the business was yielding growing losses and it was decided to establish a co-operation with Munksgaard's Publishing House in Denmark and let them handle administration, printing and distribution. The Publishing Association remained as owner of the journal and the publishing rights. The Publishing Association was responsible for the scientific content, nomenclature and linguistic quality, while Munksgaard was responsible for production and distribution. This change started from 1986 and turned out to be economically successful.

== Editorial Committee ==
From the start, Karl Myrbäck was Main Editor for the journal. He retired in 1980, but after his retirement no new Main Editor was appointed.

The following four tables show for Acta Chemica Scandinavica (1) the active national editors until end of 1973, (2) the editors for the two series during the period 1974–1999, (3) the editorial secretaries for the period 1947–1985, and (4) the Publishing Association's board members.

(1) Acta Chemica Scandinavica's National Editors during 1947–1973
Country	Period	National Editor
Denmark	1947–1962	Jens Anton Christiansen
	1963–1973	Carl Johan Ballhausen
Finland	1947–1966	A. I. Virtanen
	1967	Eero Tommila
	1968–1973	Heiki Suomalainen
Norway	1947–1956	Odd Hassel
	1957–1965	Olav Foss
	1966–1968	Alf Wickström
	1969–1973	Olav Notevarp
Sweden	1947–1973	Karl Myrbäck

(2) Acta Chemica Scandinavica's Serial Editors 1974–1999
Series	Period	Serial Editor
Series A	1974	Carl Johan Ballhausen (DK)
	1975–1981	Sven Furberg (NO)
	1982–1991	Lauri Niinistö (FI)
	1992–1995	Asbjørn Hordvik (NO)
	1996–1999	Christian Rømming (NO)
Serie B	1974	Karl Myrbäck (SE)
	1975–1999	Lennart Eberson (SE)

(3) Acta Chemica Scandinavica's Editorial Secretaries 1947–1985
Period	Editorial Secretary
1947–1951	Håkan Winberg
1952–1977	Gunnar Neumüller
1978–1985	Kurt Samuelsson

(4) The Publishing Association's Board Members
Country	Period	Board Member
Denmark	1962–1963	C. A. Bang-Petersen
	1964	Svend Erik Rasmussen
	1965–1980	Flemming Woldbye
	1981–2004	Sven Egil Harnung
Finland	1962–1969	Einar A. O. Nordenswan
	1970–1984	Jori Larinkari
	1985–1991	Tor-Magnus Enari
	1992–1999	Lauri Niinistö
	2000	Pekka Pyykkö
	2001–2004	Lauri Niinistö
Norway	1962–1965	Aage Lund
	1966	Aage Alertsen
	1967–1970	Arne Benterud
	1971–2004	Lars Skattebøl
Sweden	1962–1994	Edmund Schjånberg
	1995–2004	Agneta Sjögren

== Development during the 1990s ==
During the 1990s the publication of new scientific magazines increased and it became more and more difficult for scientific libraries at different universities to finance the escalating subscription fees. In addition, during the same period a strong restructuring of the publishing of scientific journals took place and some commercial publishers incorporated a large number of journals in their portfolios. In this way, these publishers could rationalise and standardise publishing, marketing, printing, etc. and in this way become more competitive.

In this situation, national chemical societies got increasing difficulties to maintain single scientific journals. Also in the United Kingdom this development had an impact and already in 1980 it was decided to merge the old associations the Chemical Society, the Royal Institute of Chemistry, the Faraday Society, and the Society for Analytical Chemistry into the new Royal Society of Chemistry, RSC. During the following years all their publishing activities of RSC were combined and managed from Thomas Graham House in Cambridge. In this way, RSC managed to establish a strong and modern publishing activity in the chemical fields.

For Acta Chemica Scandinavica the number of articles received, as well as the number of subscribers, decreased towards the end of the 1990s. It became clear for the Publishing Association that the activities could only continue for a limited time into the future.

== Closure ==
Thus, during 1998, it was agreed to merge Acta Chemica Scandinavica with RSC's journals for organic and for inorganic chemistry, which at that time were Dalton Transactions, Perkin Transactions 1 and Perkin Transactions 2. In 2003 the two Perkin journals were merged and the new journal was named Organic and Biomolecular Chemistry.

The agreement with RSC implied that the publishing of Acta Chemica Scandinavica was stopped from the year 2000.

The agreement between RSC and the Nordic chemical societies also connoted that for each article published in Dalton Transactions and in Organic and Biomolecular Chemistry with a Nordic main author, a certain amount was transferred to the Publishing Association. These amounts have then been split between the four part-owning societies.

== See also ==
- List of scientific journals in chemistry
