= Olav Foss =

Norwegian chemist

Olav Foss (14 January 1918 – 28 October 2007) was a Norwegian chemist.

== Early life and career ==
He was born in Bjelland as a son of a teacher. He finished his secondary education in Mandal in 1935 and graduated from the Norwegian Institute of Technology with the siv.ing. degree in 1940—receiving the excellent grade 1.4. He subsequently received a research fellowship from the Norwegian Institute of Technology in 1941, was financed by Norsk Hydro from 1942 to 1944.

However, during the German occupation of Norway, Foss was arrested on 29 December 1943 and placed in Vollan concentration camp. Transferred to Falstad concentration camp on 16 March 1944, he was further moved to Grini concentration camp on 8 May 1944, where he remained for exactly one year until the occupation ended and the camp was liberated.

He married in 1946, but his wife died in April 1947. He married for the second time in 1951.

== Academic career ==
Foss resumed as a research fellow at the Norwegian Institute of Technology on 1 July 1946. The next year he finally finished his doctorate, having defended the thesis Studies on polytriokates and related compounds. He received an NTNF grant to study at Columbia University for on year. He mainly published on selenium and tellurium compounds.

In 1949 he was appointed as an associate professor at the University of Oslo, advancing to docent of inorganic chemistry in 1954. From 1955 he served as a professor at the University of Bergen. He also headed the Chemical Institute for 18 years. Penning about 130 scientific articles, his last was published in 2004.

Foss was Norway's editor of the journal Acta Chemica Scandinavica from 1957 to 1965. In 1961 he received the Fridtjof Nansen Prize for Outstanding Research, and in 1973 the Guldberg-Waage Medal. He was inducted into the Norwegian Academy of Science and Letters in 1957, as well as the Royal Norwegian Society of Sciences and Letters, the Norwegian Academy of Technological Sciences and Bergen's Selskapet til Vitenskapenes Fremme.

He died in October 2007 at the private Florida Hospital in Bergen.

Awards
Preceded by Ragnar Nicolaysen	Recipient of the Fridtjof Nansen Prize for Outstanding Research; 1961	Succeeded by Otto Bastiansen
