= Skappel =

Skappel is a surname. Notable people with the surname include:

- Dorthe Skappel, Norwegian journalist and television personality
- Helge Skappel, Norwegian aviator, photographer, and cartographer
- Simen Skappel, Norwegian historian and statistician
- Øivin Skappel Fjeldstad, Norwegian banker and politician
