= Torstein Jøssang =

Norwegian physicist (1933–2026)

Torstein Kristen Fossan Jøssang (31 October 1933 – 5 September 2026) was a Norwegian physicist.

== Life and career ==
Torstein Kristen Fossan Jøssang was born in Jørpeland on 31 October 1933. He took the cand.real. at the University of Oslo in 1962 and took the dr.philos. degree at the same institution in 1968, following a research tenure at Ohio State University from 1963 to 1966. He has also been a guest scholar in Shenyang, Tel Aviv, Gainesville, Florida and Ponca City, Oklahoma.

He became an associate professor of physics at the University in Oslo in 1969 and professor in 1987. He has cooperated closely with physicist Jens Feder. He led the Norwegian Academy of Science and Letters' Centre for Advanced Study from 1993 to 2000, and has edited the Royal Swedish Academy of Sciences journal Physica Scripta.

Jøssang was a fellow of the Norwegian Academy of Science and Letters and the Académie Européenne des Sciences, des Arts et des Lettres.

He resided at Blommenholm. Jøssang died on 5 September 2026, at the age of 92.

Awards
Preceded by Kaj Grjotheim	Recipient of the Fridtjof Nansen Excellent Research Award in Science; 1990 (with Jens Feder)	Succeeded by Jon Bremer
