= Nordic Medical Prize =

Swedish medical prize

The Nordic Medical Prize (Swedish Nordiska medicinpriset) is a Swedish prize in medicine awarded by the SalusAnsvar/Ulf Nilsonnes Foundation for Medical Research in cooperation with the insurance company Folksam. It is the second largest medical award in the Nordic countries, after the Nobel Prize in Medicine, and includes a monetary prize of one million Swedish kronor. The prize has been awarded since 1998.

== Recipients ==
- 1998 – Lars Wallentin
- 1999 – Björn Rydevik
- 2000 – Jörgen Engel
- 2002 – Anne-Lise Børresen-Dale
- 2003 – Rikard Holmdahl and Andrej Tarkowski
- 2004 – Ulf Lerner and Jukka H. Meurman
- 2005 – Peter Arner
- 2006 – Claes Ohlsson and Kalervo Väänänen
- 2007 – Thomas Sandström
- 2010 – Markku Kaste, Perttu J. Lindsberg and Turgut Tatlisumak
- 2012 – Ola Didrik Saugstad
- 2013 – Eija Kalso and Eva Kosek
- 2014 – Erkki Isometsä and Gerhard Andersson
- 2015 – Lars Engelbretsen, Roald Bahr, Jón Karlsson and Michael Kjær
- 2016 – Heikki Joensuu and Lisa Rydén, Henrik Grönberg and Jonas Hugosson
- 2017 – Gunhild Waldemar and Kaj Blennow
- 2018 – Juleen R. Zierath and Patrik Rorsman

== See also ==
- List of medicine awards
