= Carl Semb =

Norwegian surgeon (1895–1971)

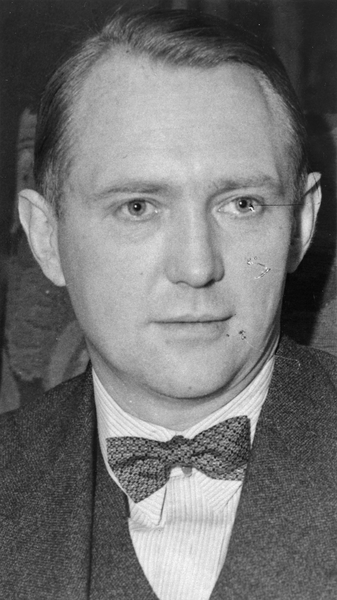
- Carl Semb, c. 1938
- Born: 19 August 1895; Kristiania, Norway
- Died: 16 July 1971 (aged 75)
- Occupation(s): Surgeon, professor
- Employer(s): Ullevål Hospital; University of Oslo
- Relatives: Gudmund Stenersen (father-in-law)
- Awards: Order of St. Olav

Carl Semb (19 August 1895 – 16 July 1971) was an internationally renowned Norwegian surgeon and professor at the University of Oslo.

== Biography ==
Carl Boye Semb grew up in Oslo, Norway. He received a cand.med. degree in 1920 and dr.med. degree in 1929. After eighteen years as a district doctor in Gimsøy Municipality and Skjervøy Municipality, Semb became chief physician at the surgical ward at Ullevål hospital (1935–65). He was a professor of surgery at the University of Oslo (1951-1965). Semb was chairman of the Norwegian Surgical Society (1940-1947). Semb was President of the Nordic Surgical Society (1955–56).

During World War II, Semb engaged in the resistance movement and joined the Milorg. He was a central Milorg leader, from 1941 to 1943, when he had to flee to Sweden. He is particularly noted for his role in the formation of Norwegian police troops in Sweden during World War II. His pioneering initiative resulted in health camps and a vaccination plan for the refugees. After the war, he was Chief of the Norwegian Army Medical Corps (1945-1947).

== Personal life ==
Senb was born in Kristiania (now Oslo) on 19 August 1895. On 19 February 1926, he married Helga Louise Stenersen, the daughter of painter Gudmund Stenersen. They had five children. In 1955, he was appointed Commander of the Order of St. Olav.

== Selected works ==
- Toracoplasty with extrafascial apicollysis (1935)
- Sykdommer i mamma (in "Nordisk lærebok i kirurgi") (1941)
- Lungenchirurgie (1944)
- Svulster og Halsens sykdommer (in "Nordisk lærebok i kirurgi") (1948)

== Other sources ==
- Söderman, Harry(1946) Polititroppene i Sverige. Norska och danska trupper i Sverige (Oslo: Gyldendal)

Awards
Preceded by Birger Kaada	Recipient of the Fridtjof Nansen Excellent Research Award in Science; 1968	Succeeded by Johan Peter Holtsmark
