= Kirsten Sandvig =

Norwegian biochemist

Kirsten Sandvig (born 17 May 1950) is a Norwegian biochemist.

== Career ==
After finishing her PhD at the University of Oslo in 1979, she was hired as a researcher at the Institute for Cancer Research, Norwegian Radium Hospital. From 1996 she was an adjunct professor at the Institute for Molecular Biosciences, University of Oslo.

In 1989 she received the Anders Jahre Medical Prize for young researchers. In 2014 the Fridtjof Nansen Prize for Outstanding Research was bestowed upon her.

She is a fellow of the Norwegian Academy of Science and Letters, of the American Academy of Microbiology as the third Norwegian to be inducted, and of the Academia Europaea. In 2007 she received an honorary degree at the University of Copenhagen.

She has been a board member and deputy chair of the Norwegian Radium Hospital and Institute for Cancer Research.

== Personal life ==
She is a daughter of engineer Steinar Uchermann Sandvig and Danish-born Vera Pedersen. Her paternal grandfather, also named Steinar Uchermann Sandvig, was a dentist and sculptor, and son of dentist and museum founder Anders Sandvig. Kirsten Sandvig's father worked at Mesna Kartonfabrik in Lillehammer at the time of her birth, but moved to Borregaard in Sarpsborg in 1951.

Awards
Preceded by Sophie D. Fosså	Recipient of King Olav V's Prize for Cancer Research; 1998	Succeeded by Per Eystein Lønning
Preceded by May-Britt Moser; Edvard Moser	Recipient of the Fridtjof Nansen Prize for Outstanding Research; 2014	Succeeded by Anne-Lise Børresen-Dale
