= Hjalmar Torp =

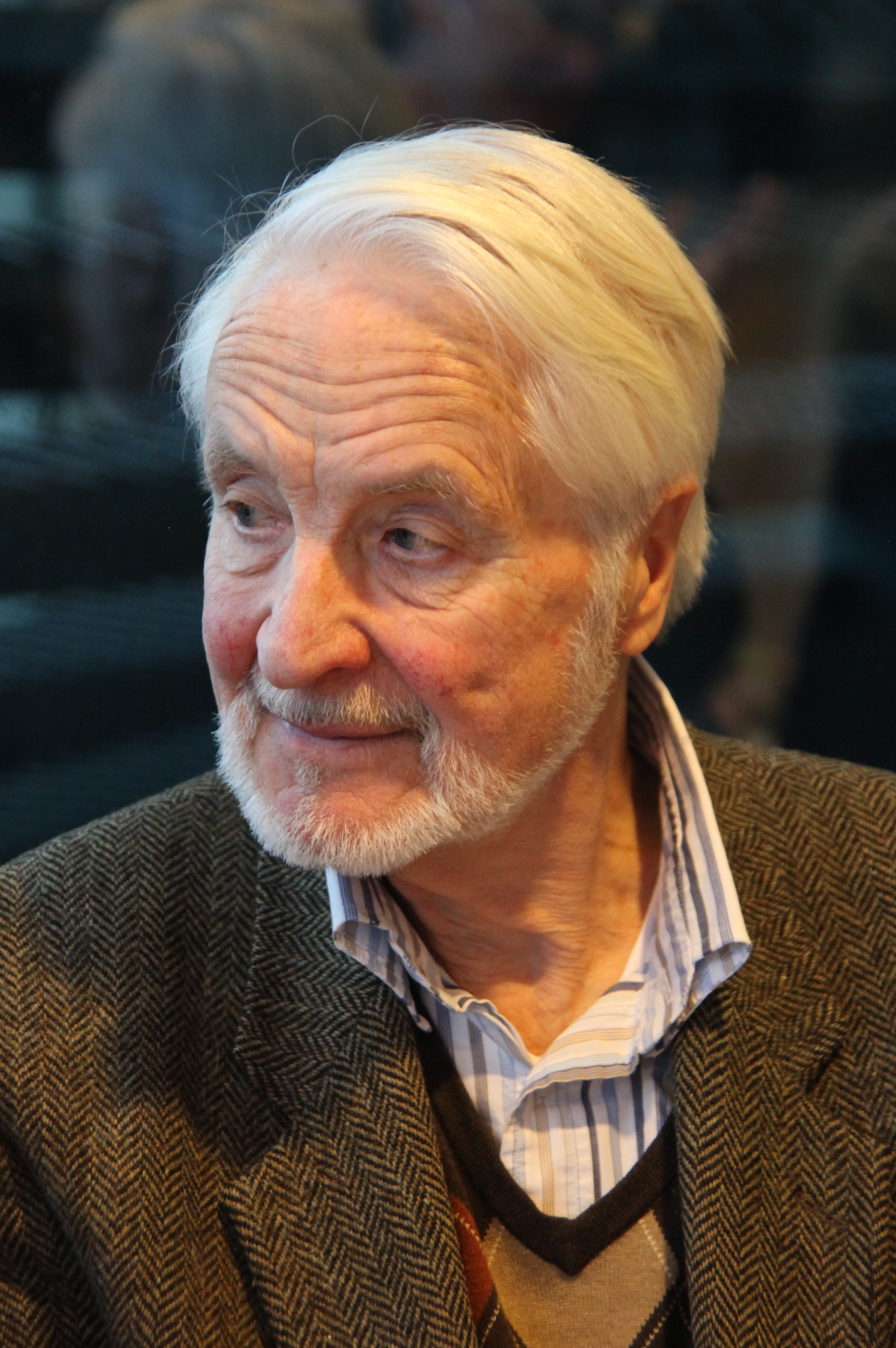
Image of Hjalmar Torp

Hjalmar Torp (14 April 1924 – 10 September 2023) was a Norwegian art historian.

Torp specialized in Byzantine art, and worked on a Langobardian tempietto in Cividale del Friuli in the late 1940s, together with Einar Dyggve and Hans Peter L'Orange. Torp studied under André Grabar at the Collège de France from 1949 to 1952, before embarking on a project studying the mosaics at the St. George Rotunda in Thessaloniki. Following two years at Dumbarton Oaks from 1953 to 1955, Torp studied Coptic sculpture from Bawit in the late 1950s.

He was a co-founder, or self-described "demiurge", of the Norwegian Institute in Rome in 1959, and worked there as a secretary until 1968. He became a professor of medieval art history at the University of Oslo, and later served as director of the Norwegian Institute in Rome from 1977 to 1983. He published in Norwegian, English, Italian, French and German.

In 1999 Torp received the Fridtjof Nansen Prize for Outstanding Research, entailing 50,000 kr. He was a fellow of the Norwegian Academy of Science and Letters. In Italy, he was decorated with the Order of Merit of Italy in 1967 and received honorary citizenship of Cividale del Friuli in 2006. He died in September 2023, 99 years old.
