= Svein Magnussen =

Norwegian psychologist

Svein Jean Magnussen (born 24 March 1942) was a Norwegian psychologist.

He took the dr.philos. degree in 1976. From 1990 he held a professorship of cognitive psychology at the University of Oslo. He was inducted into the Norwegian Academy of Science and Letters in 1998. In 2001 he was awarded the Norwegian Research Council Prize for Excellence in Research, followed by the Fridtjof Nansen Prize for Outstanding Research in 2007.

Magnussen also led a research group in witness psychology, and issued the book Vitnepsykologi. Pålitelighet og troverdighet i dagligliv og rettssal in 2004. He sat on the Criminal Cases Review Commission, and in 2008 voted to recommence the case of Arne Treholt.

He resided at Grav in Bærum.

Awards
Preceded by Nils Christian Stenseth	Recipient of the Norwegian Research Council Prize for Excellence in Research; 2001	Succeeded by Agnar Sandmo
Preceded by Jon Elster	Recipient of the Fridtjof Nansen Prize for Outstanding Research; 2007	Succeeded by Christoph Harbsmeier
