= Jon Bremer =

Norwegian biochemist

Jon Bremer (5 December 1928 – 12 November 2005) was a Norwegian biochemist.

He was born in Ås as a son of agronomy professor Anders Hillegaard Bremer, and a nephew of psychiatrist Johan Bremer. Jon Bremer finished his secondary education at Eidsvoll Landsgymnas in 1948 and graduated with the cand.med. degree from the University of Oslo in 1956. Already in 1957 he followed with the dr.med. degree with a thesis on bile acid metabolism, titled Ein in vitro-studie over konjugeringa av frie gallesyrer med taurin og glycin. He actually wrote the doctoral thesis before finishing his graduate studies, spurred by a collaboration with Lorentz Eldjarn.

He was a research fellow for the National Association Against Cancer from 1960, docent in clinical biochemistry at the University of Oslo from 1966 and professor from 1972. He was inducted into the Norwegian Academy of Science and Letters in 1981. In 1985 he received the Anders Jahre Medical Prize and the Fridtjof Nansen Prize for Outstanding Research in 1991. Among others, he did research on lecithin and carnitine. He was an active researcher until his sudden death in November 2005, aged 77.

Bremer was the first physician to write his doctoral thesis in Norwegian Nynorsk. He was a board member of Noregs Mållag from 1961 to 1965. He also presided over a fund that raised money for Nynorsk print media.

Awards
Preceded by Kari Kivirikko	Recipient of the Anders Jahre Medical Prize; 1985	Succeeded by Morten Simonsen
Preceded by Torstein Jøssang	Recipient of the Fridtjof Nansen Prize for Outstanding Research; 1991	Succeeded by Lars Walløe
