= Karl Myrbäck =

Swedish chemist (1900–1986)

Karl David Reinhold Myrbäck
- Born: 7 September 1900; Vendel, Sweden
- Died: 1 July 1985 (aged 84); Stockholm, Sweden
- Education: Stockholms högskola
- Scientific career
- Fields: Chemistry, biochemistry
- Workplaces: Stockholms högskola, Stockholm University

Karl David Reinhold Myrbäck (7 September 1900 – 1 July 1986) was a Swedish chemist.

Myrbäck graduated with a Ph.D. degree in 1927 from Stockholms högskola with a thesis on enzyme chemistry. He became Docent of biochemistry in 1926, and Laborator at the Department of Biochemistry at Stockholms högskola in 1928. He was appointed professor of fermentation chemistry at Stockholms högskola in 1932, and of organic chemistry and biochemistry in 1947. Between 1963 and 1967, he was professor of biochemistry at Stockholm University. He was elected to both the Royal Swedish Academy of Sciences and the Royal Swedish Academy of Engineering Sciences in 1943, and acted subsequently as Deputy Secretary of the Royal Swedish Academy of Engineering Sciences. Myrbäck became editor-in-chief of the scientific journal Acta Chemica Scandinavica in 1947.

== Family ==
Karl Myrbäck was son of editor Herman Myrbäck and Helena, née Lundgren. In 1927, he married Signe Karlsson (1900–1983), daughter of restaurant keeper Alfred Karlsson and Hilda, née Wester.

== Sources ==
- Vem är det : Svensk biografisk handbok 1975, Eva Löwgren (Ed.), P. A. Norstedt & Söners Förlag, Stockholm 1974 ISBN 91-1-746002-6 p. 719
