= Lars Wallentin =

Swedish physician and cardiologist

- Born: 1943 (age 82–83)
- Education: Linköping University
- Medical career
- Profession: Doctor
- Institutions: Uppsala University
- Sub-specialties: Cardiology

Lars Wallentin (born 1943) is a Swedish physician and cardiologist. In 1998 he was the first recipient of the Nordic Medical Prize, the second largest medical award in the Nordic countries. He was elected as a member of the Royal Swedish Academy of Sciences in 2007. He has been described by the European Heart Journal as an "international, superstar cardiologist".

He holds a doctorate in medicine from Linköping University in 1976 and is a full professor of cardiology at Uppsala University. He is one of the world's leading experts on unstable coronary artery disease, and one of the most highly cited cardiologists overall.

== Honours ==
- Nordic Medical Prize, 1998
- Lars Werkö Prize, 2004
- Member of the Royal Swedish Academy of Sciences, 2007
- (Sweden) H. M. The King's Medal, 8th size, worn on the ribbon of the Order of the Seraphim (6 June 2026)
