= Anne-Lise Børresen-Dale =

Norwegian biochemist

Anne-Lise Børresen-Dale is a Norwegian biochemist. She is a senior scientist at Oslo University Hospital and Professor of molecular tumor biology at the University of Oslo. She received the 2002 Nordic Medical Prize. In 2015 she received the Fritjof Nansen medal and award for Outstanding Research from the Norwegian Academy of Science and Letters, and in 2017 she was appointed to Commander of the Royal Norwegian St. Olavs Order by the King of Norway.

She holds an M.Sc. in biochemistry from the Norwegian Institute of Technology (1970), a D.Sc. in medical biochemical genetics from the University of Oslo (1978) and was awarded full professor competence in gene technology in 1987. She was employed at the Institute of Medical Genetics at the University of Oslo from 1970 as a research assistant, research fellow, senior research fellow and head of section. From 1987 she was a senior scientist at the Department of Genetics at the Norwegian Radium Hospital, and since 1999 she has also been head of department. She has additionally been Professor of molecular tumor biology at the University of Oslo since 1992.

== Honours ==
- King Olav V's Prize for Cancer Research, 1994
- Member of the Royal Norwegian Society of Sciences and Letters, 1998
- Honorary member of the Norwegian Biochemical Society, 2001
- Research Prize of the University of Oslo, 2002
- Nordic Medical Prize, 2002
- Member of the Norwegian Academy of Science and Letters, 2004
- Swiss Bridge Award for outstanding Cancer Research, 2004
- Honorary doctorate in medicine (dr.med. h.c.), University of Copenhagen, 2008
- Möbius Prize of the Research Council of Norway, 2008
- Member of the European Academy of Cancer Sciences, 2009
- Honorary ambassador of the Norwegian Cancer Society, 2010
- Honorary member of The Hungarian Cancer Society, 2012
- Helmholtz International Fellow Award, Germany, 2014
- European Journal of Surgical Oncology Award Lecture, 2014
- Elena Timofeeff-Ressovsky Lecturer, Berlin, 2015
- Mildred Scheel Lecturer, Germany, 2015
- Fritjof Nansen medal and award for Outstanding Research, 2015
- Oslo University Hospital's Excellent Researcher Award, 2015
- The AACR Distinguished Lectureship in Breast Cancer Research, 2015
- AACR-Women in Cancer Research Charlotte Friend Memorial Lectureship and award, 2017
- Commander of the Royal Norwegian St. Olavs Order, 2017

Awards
Preceded by Terje Espevik	Recipient of King Olav V's Prize for Cancer Research; 1994	Succeeded by Stein-Ove Døskeland
Preceded by Kirsten Sandvig	Recipient of the Fridtjof Nansen Prize for Outstanding Research; 2015	Succeeded by Trond Helge Torsvik (2017)
