= Tore Slagsvold =

Norwegian zoologist

Tore Slagsvold (born 16 December 1947) is a Norwegian zoologist.

He took his dr.philos. degree in 1978 and became professor at the University of Oslo in 1991. He edited the Journal of Avian Biology from 1993 to 2001. As one of Norway's most cited scientists, he was one of 14 people in the country to rank as "highly cited" in the ISI Index in 2010.

Slagsvold is a member of the Norwegian Academy of Science and Letters since 1995. In 2006 he won the Fridtjof Nansen Prize for Outstanding Research.

Awards
Preceded by Hans Prydz	Recipient of the Fridtjof Nansen Outstanding Research Award in Science; 2006	Succeeded by Ola M. Johannessen
