= Alf Bjørnskau Bastiansen =

Norwegian politician (1883–1965)

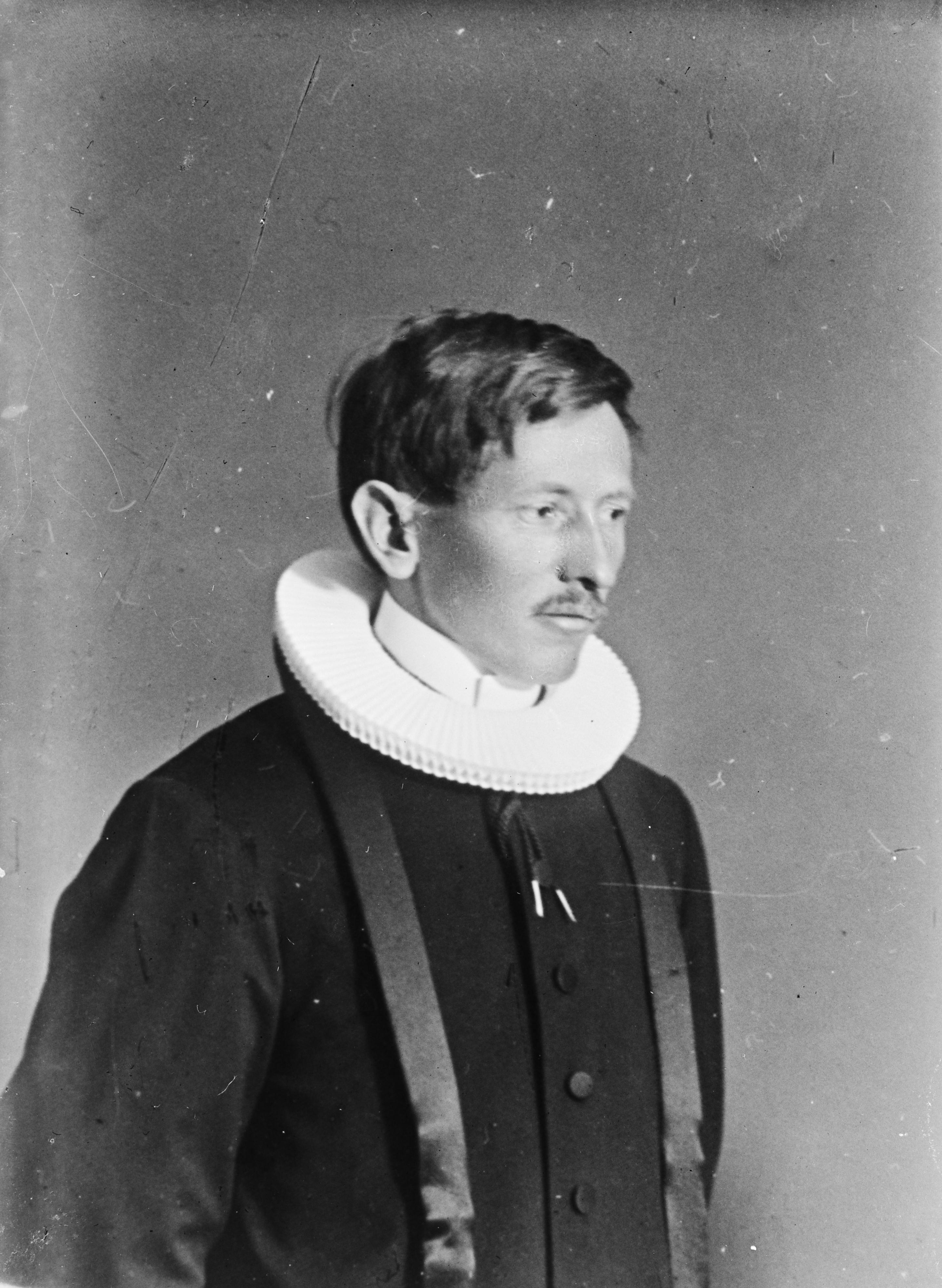
- Bastiansen, c. 1910–1920
- Born: 18 November 1883; Tjøme Municipality, Norway
- Died: 7 May 1965 (aged 81); Oslo, Norway
- Children: Peter Ivan Lodtz Bastiansen, Otto Christian Astrup Bastiansen
- Parents: Otto Bernhard Bastiansen (father); Anna Sofie Bjørnskau (mother)

Alf Bjørnskau Bastiansen (18 November 1883 – 7 May 1965) was a Norwegian priest and politician for the Labour Party. Chairing the Norges Kristne Arbeideres Forbund from 1939 to 1948, he was among the co-founders and became an honorary member. He was elected mayor of Vadsø Municipality before being appointed as a vicar in Balsfjord Municipality, where he was also elected mayor. He continued his clerical career in Hvaler Municipality from 1919, Drammen Municipality from 1929 and Oslo from 1937. Except for a period of three years when he was deposed by the Quisling regime, he served as vicar in Kampen Church until 1953, and was also an Oslo city councilman.
