= Otto Bastiansen =

Norwegian chemist (1918–1995)

Otto Christian Astrup Bastiansen
- Born: September 5, 1918; Balsfjord
- Died: October 2, 1995 (aged 77); Oslo
- Parents: Alf Bjørnskau Bastiansen (father); Petra Christine Johanne Astrup (mother)
- Relatives: Peter Ivan Lodtz Bastiansen (brother)

Otto Christian Astrup Bastiansen (5 September 1918 – 2 October 1995) was a Norwegian chemist and physical chemist.

He was the son of priest Alf Bjørnskau Bastiansen and brother of jurist Peter Bastiansen. He took the dr.philos. degree in 1949, and was hired as a lecturer at the University of Oslo in 1954. Already in 1955 he became professor of theoretical chemistry at the Norwegian Institute of Technology. He returned to the University of Oslo in 1962, and switched from theoretical chemistry to physical chemistry in 1964. From 1965 to 1969 he chaired the research council NAVF. He was then vice rector from 1970 to 1973 and rector from 1973 to 1976 at the University of Oslo. He was also a visiting scholar, both in the United States and at the University of Moscow.

Otto Bastiansen was a member of the first anti-nuclear organization in Norway, together with John Engh, Johan Bernitz Hygen and Odd Hølaas, among others.

Awards
Preceded by Olav Foss	Recipient of the Fridtjof Nansen Prize for Outstanding Research; 1962	Succeeded by Leiv Kreyberg
Academic offices
Preceded by Johs. Andenæs	Rector of the University of Oslo; 1973–1976	Succeeded by Bjarne A. Waaler
