= Sven Josef Cyvin =

Norwegian chemist (1931–2013)

- Education: Norwegian Institute of Technology
- Awards: Fridtjof Nansen Prize for Outstanding Research
- Scientific career
- Fields: Chemistry
- Workplaces: Norwegian Institute of Technology

Sven Josef Cyvin (25 February 1931 – 19 September 2013) was a Norwegian chemist.

== Early life and education ==
He was born in Czechoslovakia, but emigrated to Norway with his parents in 1940. He finished his secondary education at Trondheim Cathedral School in 1949 and graduated in chemical engineering at the Norwegian Institute of Technology in 1956. During his studies, he met his wife and collaborator Bjørg Cyvin. In 1960 he took the dr.techn. degree. From 1964 he was a docent, and from 1970 to his retirement he was a professor of theoretical chemistry at the Norwegian Institute of Technology. He was a fellow of the Norwegian Academy of Science and Letters and the Royal Norwegian Society of Sciences and Letters.

Cyvin was a prolific researcher, publishing over 700 articles during his career. was also active in the social movements Pugwash, Nei til Atomvåpen and Framtiden i våre hender.

Awards
Preceded by Arnoldus Schytte Blix	Recipient of the Fridtjof Nansen Excellent Research Award in Science; 1995 (with Bjørg Cyvin)	Succeeded by Bernt Øksendal
