= Lorentz Eldjarn =

Norwegian biochemist and medical doctor

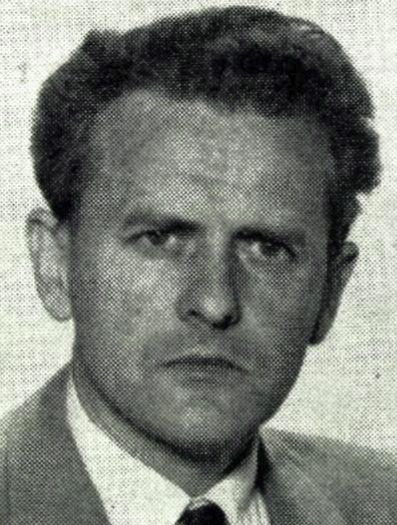
- Norwegian physicist Lorentz Eldjarn
- Born: 23 March 1920; Måsøy
- Died: 11 February 2007 (aged 86)
- Occupations: Biochemist and medical doctor
- Awards: Fridtjof Nansen Excellent Research Award in Science (1970); Anders Jahre's Award for Medical Research (1976)

Lorentz Eldjarn (23 March 1920 – 11 February 2007) was a Norwegian biochemist and medical doctor. He pioneered the use of quality control methods in Norwegian hospital laboratories.

== Biography ==
Lorentz Eldjarn was born on 23 March 1920 in Måsøy Municipality in Finnmark, Norway, later moving to Haslum. He studied medicine at the University of Oslo, completing his medical degree in 1947. He then studied physics and organic chemistry and completed a research fellowship in Sweden with the biochemist Hugo Theorell. He was appointed to the Norwegian Radium Hospital in 1951 as the chief physician of its laboratory. He oversaw the redevelopment of the Radium Hospital's laboratory to update its diagnostic methods using blood and urine samples, and in 1959 he moved to the Rikshospitalet (National Hospital) as laboratory chief physician and professor of clinical chemistry.

Eldjarn's thesis from 1954 treated metabolism of cystamine and cysteamine. He was a pioneer in the development of diagnostic methods and the use of clinical and chemical laboratories. He was a proponent of quality control methods at the Rikshospitalet and carried out a nationwide survey of 50 hospital laboratories in 1964. In collaboration with a pharmaceutical company, he produced reference samples to enable laboratories to correct errors in their diagnostic tests. He resigned from his hospital position in 1978 to establish his own company, SERO, which continues to produce quality control materials for laboratories.

He was inducted into the Norwegian Academy of Science and Letters in 1963. In 1970 he was awarded the Fridtjof Nansen Prize for Outstanding Research, and in 1976 the Anders Jahre's Award for Medical Research.

He died on 11 February 2007 in Bærum Municipality in Akershus county.

Awards
Preceded by Johan Peter Holtsmark	Recipient of the Fridtjof Nansen Excellent Research Award in Science; 1970	Succeeded by Ivan Rosenqvist
