= Bernt Øksendal =

Norwegian mathematician (born 1945)

Bernt K. Øksendal
- Born: 10 April 1945 (age 81); Fredrikstad, Norway
- Education: University of California, Los Angeles
- Known for: Stochastic processes
- Scientific career
- Fields: Mathematician
- Thesis: Peak sets and interpolation sets for some algebras of analytic functions (1971)
- Doctoral advisor: Theodore Gamelin
- Doctoral students: An Thi Kieu Ta, Yeliz Yolcu Okur, Mark Rubtsov, Paul Carlisle Kettler, Torstein Nilssen, David Ruiz Baños

Notes
- www.math.uio.no/~oksendal/

Bernt Karsten Øksendal (born 10 April 1945 in Fredrikstad) is a Norwegian mathematician. He completed his undergraduate studies at the University of Oslo, working under Otte Hustad. He obtained his PhD from University of California, Los Angeles in 1971; his thesis was titled Peak Sets and Interpolation Sets for Some Algebras of Analytic Functions and was supervised by Theodore Gamelin. In 1991, he was appointed as a professor at the University of Oslo. In 1992, he was appointed as an adjunct professor at the Norwegian School of Economics and Business Administration, Bergen, Norway.

His main field of interest is stochastic analysis, including stochastic control, optimal stopping, stochastic ordinary and partial differential equations and applications, particularly to physics, biology and finance. For his contributions to these fields, he was awarded the Nansen Prize in 1996. He has been a member of the Norwegian Academy of Science and Letters since 1996. He was elected as a member of the Norwegian Royal Society of Sciences in 2002.

As of February 2003, Øksendal has over 130 published works, including nine books. In 1982 he taught a postgraduate course in stochastic calculus at the University of Edinburgh which led to the book Øksendal, Bernt K. (1982). Stochastic Differential Equations: An Introduction with Applications. Springer, Berlin. In 2005, he taught a course in stochastic calculus at the African Institute for Mathematical Sciences in Cape Town.

He resided at Hosle. He married Eva Aursland in June 1968. They have three children: Elise (born 1971), Anders (1974) and Karina (1981).

== Awards and appointments ==
- Visiting research fellow at the University of Edinburgh, Scotland. The fellowship was awarded by the Science and Engineering Research Council, UK (Jan.-June 1982).
- Norwegian Mathematical Society (chairman 1987-1989)
- Appointed VISTA Professor by The Norwegian Academy of Sciences (1992–1996)
- Awarded Nansen Prize (1996)
- Elected member of Royal Norwegian Science Society (2002)
- European Research Council's Advanced Grant for Innovations in Stochastic Analysis and Applications (INNOSTOCH) (2009–2014)
- Awarded University of Oslo Research Prize for excellent research (2014)
- Scientific leader of the research program Challenges in Stochastic Control, Information and Applications (STOCONINF) (2016–2020)
- Appointed honorary doctor at the Norwegian School of Economics

== Selected publications ==
=== Articles ===
- with Alexander Munro Davie: Davie, A. M; Øksendal, B. K (1971). "Rational approximation on the union of sets". Proc. Amer. Math. Soc. 29 (3): 581–584. doi:10.1090/S0002-9939-1971-0277725-6.
- Øksendal, Bernt K (1971). "A short proof of the F. and M. Riesz theorem". Proc. Amer. Math. Soc. 30: 204. doi:10.1090/S0002-9939-1971-0279316-X.
- with A. M. Davie: Davie, Alexander M; Øksendal, Bernt (1982). "Analytic capacity and differentiability properties of finely harmonic functions". Acta Mathematica. 149 (1): 127–152. doi:10.1007/BF02392352.
- Øksendal, Bernt (1985). "Finely harmonic functions with finite Dirichlet integral with respect to the Green measure". Trans. Amer. Math. Soc. 287 (2): 687–700. doi:10.1090/S0002-9947-1985-0768734-3.
- with Helge Holden: Holden, Helge; Øksendal, Bernt (2000). "A White Noise Approach to Stochastic Neumann Boundary-Value Problems". Acta Applicandae Mathematicae. 63 (1–3): 141–150. doi:10.1023/A:1010730510108. S2CID 118131786.
- Øksendal, Bernt (2008). "Stochastic partial differential equations driven by multi-parameter white noise of Lévy processes". Quart. Appl. Math. 66 (3): 521–537. doi:10.1090/S0033-569X-08-01090-5. hdl:10852/10513.

=== Books ===
- Øksendal, Bernt K. and Sydsæter, Knut (1996). Lineær Algebra. Universitetsforlaget.
- Øksendal, Bernt K. (2003). Stochastic Differential Equations: An Introduction with Applications. Springer, Berlin. ISBN 978-3-540-04758-2.; Øksendal, Bernt (2010). 6th edition. Springer. ISBN 9783642143946.
- Øksendal, Bernt K. and Sulem, Agnès (2005). Stochastic control of jump diffusions, Springer Verlag.
- Holden, Helge; Øksendal, Bernt; Ubøe, Jan; Zhang, Tusheng (2009). Stochastic partial differential equations: A modeling, white noise functional approach. Springer. ISBN 9780387894881.
- Biagini, Francesca; Hu, Yaozhong; Øksendal, Bernt; Zhang, Tusheng (2008). Stochastic calculus for fractional Brownian motion and applications. Probability and its Applications. Springer. doi:10.1007/978-1-84628-797-8. ISBN 978-1-85233-996-8. MR 2387368.

Awards
Preceded by Bjørg Cyvin; Sven Josef Cyvin	Recipient of the Fridtjof Nansen Excellent Research Award in Science; 1996	Succeeded by Jan K. S. Jansen
