= Gerhard Andersson =

Swedish psychologist (born 1966)

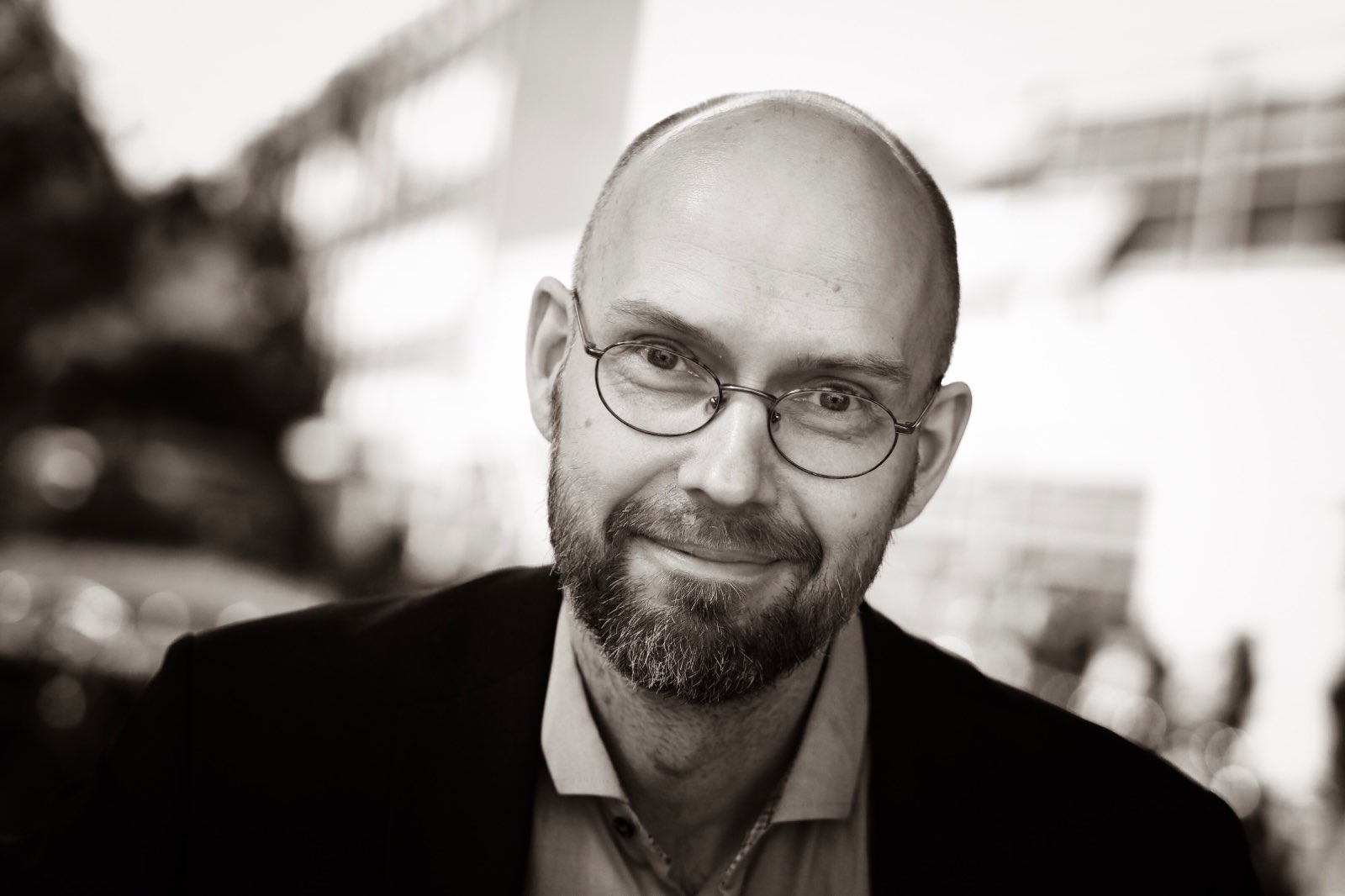
- Born: 10 June 1966 (age 60); Norrköping, Sweden
- Education: Uppsala University
- Known for: Internet-based psychological treatments Cognitive behavioural treatment of tinnitus
- Scientific career
- Fields: Clinical Psychology
- Workplaces: Linköping University; Karolinska Institute
- Website: www.gerhardandersson.se

Gerhard Andersson (born 10 June 1966) is a Swedish psychologist, psychotherapist and Professor of clinical psychology at Linköping University. He is also affiliated researcher at Karolinska Institutet. He was a co-recipient of the Nordic Medical Prize in 2014.

Professor Andersson is one of the most influential researchers in the world on Internet-based psychological treatments. Moreover, his contributions in the field of tinnitus have enriched the research field widely. Andersson was appointed a professor at the age of 37, and has been highly productive, having produced more than 980 scientific papers. He is known for his many collaborations with researchers and clinicians and has remained clinically active during his whole career. Gerhard Andersson won the Swedish Psychologist Award in 2014. He received a Lifetime Achievement Award 2017 from the International Society for Research on Internet Interventions International Society for Research on Internet Interventions. Professor Andersson is currently main supervisor of 9 PhD students and co-supervisor for 12 PhD students. To date, 31 former PhD students for whom Professor Andersson has been the main supervisor have been awarded a PhD. Eleven of Professor Andersson's former PhD students have become full professors, and nine of those in clinical psychology: Professor Per Carlbring Stockholm University, Professor Viktor Kaldo (Linnéuniversitetet), Professor Erik Hedman-Lagerlöf (Karolinska Institute), professor Brjann Ljotsson (Karolinska Institute), Professor Erik Andersson (Karolinska Institute), Professor Hugo Hesser (Örebro University), Professor Alexander Rozental (Luleå University), Professor Monica Buhrman (Uppsala University) and Professor Robert Johansson Stockholm University. Moreover, Professor Andersson has been faculty opponent for several PhD candidates and external reviewer for several PhD theses in Sweden and abroad.

== Research fields ==
=== Internet treatment—the Swedish approach ===
Gerhard Andersson can further be named as the founder of the Swedish approach to internet-delivered cognitive-behaviour therapy (CBT). In one of the publications from the group, Andersson et al. (2008, p. 164) refer to the Internet-based approach as:"a therapy that is based on self-help books, guided by an identified therapist which gives feedback and answers to questions, with a scheduling that mirrors face-to-face treatment, and which also can include interactive online features such as queries to obtain passwords in order to get access to treatment modules."

The Swedish approach is different from purely self-administered self-help since it combines the advantages of structured self-help materials with the provision of guidance by an identified therapist. In particular, the role of the therapist is highlighted in the treatment trials conducted by Professor Andersson and his group. The therapist provides support, encouragement, motivation, and answers to patient's questions. Hence, the cognitive-behavioural treatment resembles rather a live treatment than a pure self-help treatment, but is provided via the Internet. A similar way to deliver Internet treatment has been endorsed by other researchers across the world. Despite the important role of the therapist, Internet-delivered treatments require much less therapist time than conventional CBT. Furthermore, Internet-based CBT allows patients to work at their own pace whenever they find the time to work on the material. This procedure gives a lot of responsibility to the patient, which can be helpful for the final treatment outcome. Several studies conducted by Andersson and his colleagues show a high efficacy of the Internet-based treatment approach for very different disorders, e.g. depression, social anxiety, and tinnitus. Current studies of the group compare the efficacy of Internet-delivered CBT with traditional CBT approaches, e.g. face-to-face treatment, group therapy. Due to Andersson's studies on Internet-based approaches to deliver psychotherapy, Sweden is world leading in online-based treatments. The research has generated quite a lot of media attention in Sweden, but also in other countries. Research on psychological treatments on the Internet is available from several other research groups as well.

=== Tinnitus ===
Gerhard Andersson is one of the world leading researchers in the field of psychologically oriented tinnitus research. His contributions to the field has been influential. For example, Andersson and his colleagues provided the first comprehensive meta-analytic review on psychological treatments of tinnitus in 1999. In the following years, Andersson was interested in basic research as well as in the development and improvement of psychological treatment approaches. Thus, he studied for example cognitive disruptions in tinnitus patients, changes in regional cerebral blood flow or the role of tinnitus loudness for perceived distress. Moreover, Andersson and his colleagues developed several treatment concepts to reduce tinnitus distress based on cognitive behavioural therapy.

=== Health psychology ===
As a clinical psychologist working in the field of behavioral medicine for 20 years, Andersson has devoted much of his research to the study of how behavioral, cognitive, biological, and social variables influence health and illness. His research in this area covers a broad range of conditions, including chronic pain, cancer, irritable bowel syndrome, dizziness, hearing loss, tinnitus, burn damages, and health anxiety. Andersson's work focuses primarily on the development and evaluation of behavioral and cognitive therapies for medical conditions, but his research in health psychology also concerns the study of how cognitive, behavioral and genetic factors are involved in health and prevention of illness. A particular interest of his is cognitive aspects and to apply various theories and methods from cognitive psychology in the study of health problems. Among many recent activities, Andersson is currently involved in studies on the role of acceptance in chronic medical conditions, including the first clinical trials on acceptance oriented CBT for tinnitus.

=== Other research ===
Andersson is also active in research fields such as psychotherapy research and the psychology of religion. He is the former editor-in-chief and now associate editor for the journal Internet Interventions.

== Education ==
Professor Andersson received his education at Uppsala University, Department of Psychology, and graduated in 1991 (M.Sc. in Clinical Psychology). His first Ph.D. was in Clinical Psychology (1995) and his second Ph.D. was in Medicine (2000). He has also completed a B.A. in Theology (2010), a M.A. in Theology (2024) and also a B.A in Comparative literature (2026). In terms of clinical training he has completed a degree in psychotherapy (2005) and supervisor training (2016). In 1997, Andersson received the qualification as associate professor. He was appointed full professor in clinical psychology at Linköping University in 2003. Between 2007 and onwards Andersson has had a position as affiliated researcher at the Karolinska Institutet, Stockholm, in the department of Clinical Neuroscience, Psychiatry. He is also linked to Universidade Lusófona, Lissabon, Portugal (since 2021) and Luleå Technical University (since 2025). During his whole career he has worked part-time as a clinician, mainly in audiology, but also in psychiatry.

== Publications ==
Professor Andersson has published more than 970 scientific papers, 27 books and more than 80 book chapters. His present h-index on Scopus is 131(last updated 2026-11-18).

== Hobbies ==
Gerhard Andersson is an active skateboarder and has written a book on the topic. He is also responsible for a website on skateboarding in Norrköping. Another interest is music and he plays in a band called Obstipation where he plays guitar and sings. They perform at restaurants and parties.
