= Gudmund Stenersen =

Norwegian artist (1863–1934)

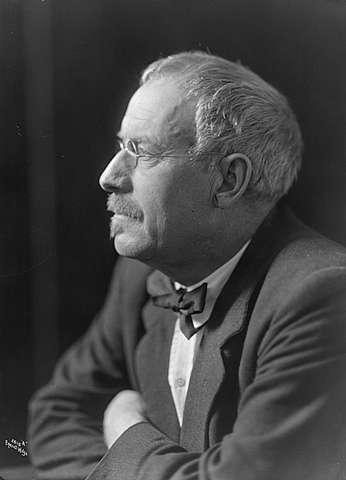
Gudmund Stenersen in 1921

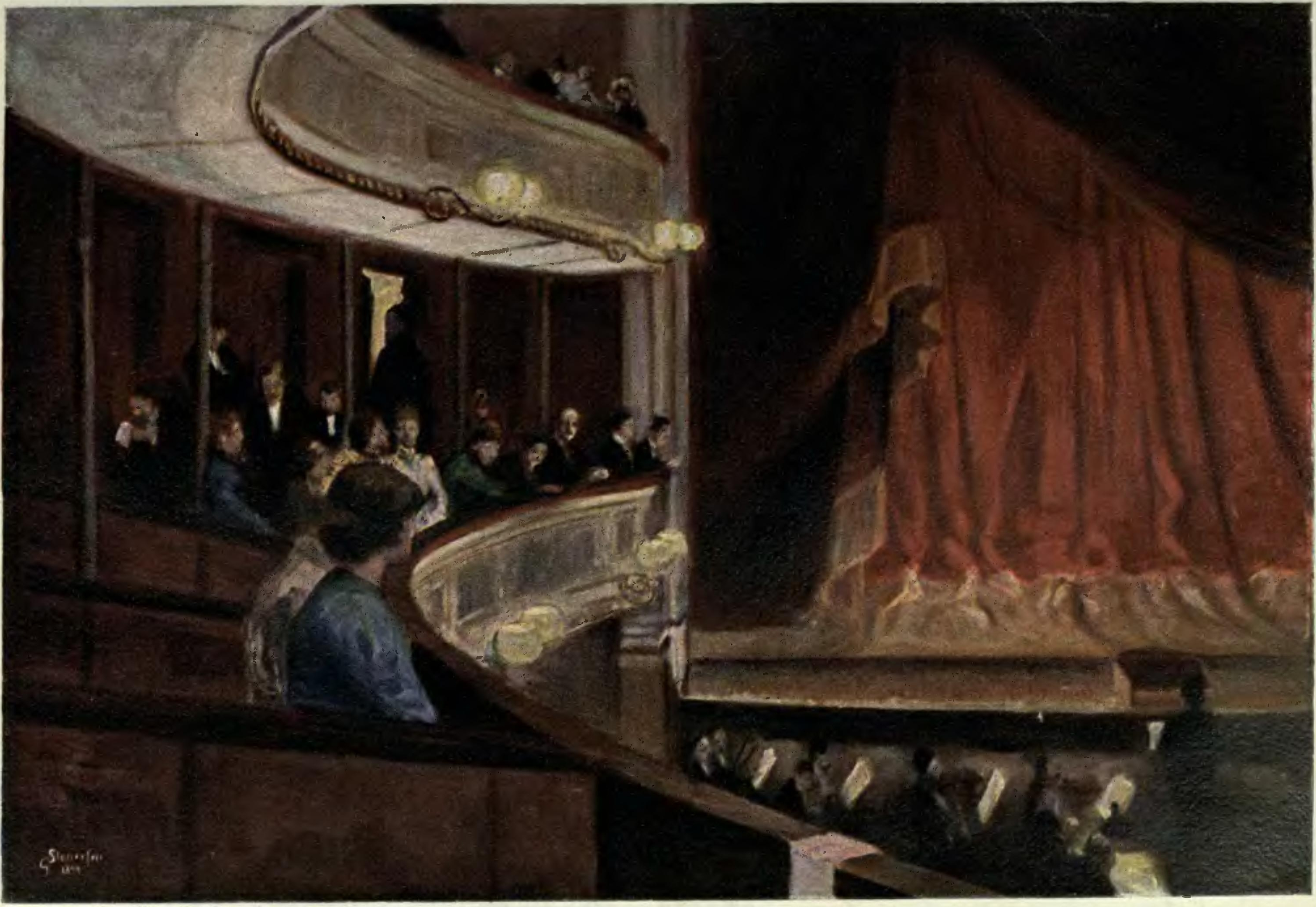
Intermission at the Christiania Theater (1899).

Gudmund Stenersen (18 August 1863 – 17 August 1934) was a Norwegian painter and illustrator.

== Biography ==
He was born in Ringsaker Municipality to veterinarian Stener Johannes Stenersen (1835–1904) and Helga Hermana Heltberg (1842–1921). He was a grandnephew of theologian Stener Johannes Stenersen, Sr. (1789–1835). He took his examen artium in Hamar in 1883, and then took education and work as a dentist while painting in his spare time. His first work to be accepted at the Autumn Exhibit was I Baadstøe in 1885.

After working as a dentist in Tønsberg from 1886 to 1889, he studied in Paris under Léon Bonnat and Fernand Cormon from 1889 to 1892. He then spent 1893 and 1894 in Italy. He then moved to Stavanger. There, in January 1897, he married Karen Wally Jacobsen (1874–1962), the daughter of a photographer. In 1898 they moved to Christiania. He became the father-in-law of Carl Semb, who married his daughter Helga Louise Stenersen, in February 1926.

He mainly painted in the naturalist style, with portraits of Christiania as well as Odal, Gudbrandsdalen, Vestfold, and Valdres. He also portrayed many notable people of the day. He was also a notable illustrator, among others in the books Vestlandsviser (by Vilhelm Krag, 1898), Fra fjeld og fremmed Land (by Theodor Caspari, 1900), Smaafæ (by Hans Aanrud, 1906 as well as his own publication Besøg i skogen (1905).

He contributed illustrations to Aftenposten in 1917, and also made Christmas magazines. His notable paintings include Fra Siena (1893) and Njosgardene i Valdres (1893–1902), which are owned by the National Museum of Art, Architecture and Design.

Stenersen chaired Tegneforbundet from 1901 to 1926, and was a freemason. He died in August 1934 in Oslo.
