= Ludvig Sollid =

Norwegian researcher and immunologist

Ludvig M. Sollid (born 18 September 1962) is a Norwegian physician-scientist whose laboratory has made discoveries in the pathogenesis of HLA associated human disorders, most notably celiac disease. He is currently a Professor of Medicine (immunology) at the University of Oslo (Institute of Clinical Medicine) and a Senior Consultant at Oslo University Hospital.

== Career ==
After finishing school at Stabekk gymnas (high school), he entered medical school at the University of Oslo in 1981. He started doing research during his medical studies with Erik Thorsby and Per Brandtzaeg as supervisors. He completed medical school and afterwards he did service at hospital and in general practice in Norway to get his medical license. He then took up research again at the University of Oslo to complete his doctoral studies. He defended his doctoral thesis in 1992. He continued research activities as a postdoc in the group of Erik Thorsby. He got a faculty position at the Institute of Transplantation Immunology, University of Oslo and served as a full professor and group leader from 1996. He still holds this position at the Department of Immunology. He was a Visiting Scholar and Fulbright fellow at Stanford University in 2003-2004. He had shorter stays as Visiting Scholar at Stanford University in 2014 and 2022 and at University of Chicago in 2016. He served as the Director of the Centre for Immune Regulation (2007-2017) which was a Centre of Excellence funded by the Research Council of Norway and a Director of the KG Jebsen Coeliac Disease Research Centre (2016-2022) funded by Stiftelsen Kristian Gerhard Jebsen.

== Research ==
He has uncovered key pathogenic mechanisms of the widespread condition celiac disease. Celiac disease develops in genetically predisposed individuals on exposure to dietary cereal gluten proteins. Human leukocyte antigen is as a major genetic risk factor for celiac disease, and he identified the HLA allotype HLA-DQ2.5 as the major culprit HLA molecule. This HLA molecule is carried by most celiac disease patients, and the remaining patients carry HLA-DQ2.2 or HLA-DQ8. He and his coworkers demonstrated that celiac disease patients who express HLA-DQ2.5 have gluten-specific CD4+ T cells in their gut mucosa that recognize gluten antigen in the context of this HLA molecule. Later he showed that celiac disease patients who express HLA-DQ8 and HLA-DQ2.2 have gluten-specific T cells that recognize gluten antigen in context of these HLA-DQ molecules. Biochemical peptide binding studies revealed that HLA-DQ2.5 has preference for binding antigenic peptides with negatively charged residues, yet gluten proteins have few negatively charged amino acids. An answer to this conundrum came with the observation that transglutaminase 2, an enzyme to which celiac disease patients generate autoantibodies, can posttranslationally modify gluten peptides by converting certain glutamine residues to negatively charged glutamate residues in a process called deamidation. A little later, the group of Frits Koning published similar results. The research group of Sollid identified the sequence of immunodominant gluten peptides recognized by T cells of celiac disease patients. Together with the group of Chaitan Khosla he solved the x-ray crystal structure of HLA-DQ2.5 with a bound deamidated gluten T-cell epitope.

More recently he has transitioned his research to studies of the antibody response in celiac disease. His research aimed to answer the question why exposure to a foreign antigen (gluten) causes production of autoantibodies. His group has established human monoclonal antibodies from single plasma cells of the celiac gut lesion, both transglutaminase 2-specific as well as gluten-specific antibodies. This work has allowed detailed analysis of how celiac antibodies recognize the autoantigen, and it has enabled the establishment of a mouse model to study autoantibody formation to transglutaminase 2. Surprisingly, there is no B-cell tolerance to transglutaminase 2 in mice that have been made knock-in for a celiac antibody that recognizes both human and mouse transglutaminase 2. In such mice the generation of autoantibodies seems to be contingent on T-cell help from gluten-specific T cells – a type of help that he early suggested to be mediated by such T cells via involvement of hapten-carrier like TG2-gluten complexes.

Collectively, his work gives mechanistic insights into how the disease-predisposing HLA-DQ molecules, via presentation of posttranslationally modified gluten peptides, are connected to the generation of autoantibodies to transglutaminase 2 in celiac disease, as reviewed.

== Awards and honors ==
- Anders Jahre's Medical Award for Scientists in the Nordic countries - junior award, 1998. Shared with Lars Fugger.
- Rikshospitalet's Prize for Outstanding Research, 2002.
- Elected member of the Norwegian Academy of Science and Letters, 2004.
- The Research Council of Norway's Møbius Prize for Outstanding Research, 2006.
- Wm. K. Warren, Jr. Prize for Excellence in Celiac Disease Research, 2007.
- Rank Prize for Nutrition, 2012. Shared with Frits Koning.
- Fridtjof Nansen Award for Excellence in Science, 2012.
- United European Gastroenterology Research Prize, 2012.
- Oslo University Hospital Excellent Researcher Award, 2014.
- Anders Jahre's Medical Award for Scientists in the Nordic countries - senior award, 2015. Shared with Rikard Holmdahl.
- Honorary Member Norwegian Society for Immunology, 2016.
- Research Prize. University of Oslo, 2022.

== Personal life ==
He lives in Oslo, Norway, with his wife, Anna Saetersdal.
