= Carl Georg With =

Norwegian military officer

Carl Georg With.jpg
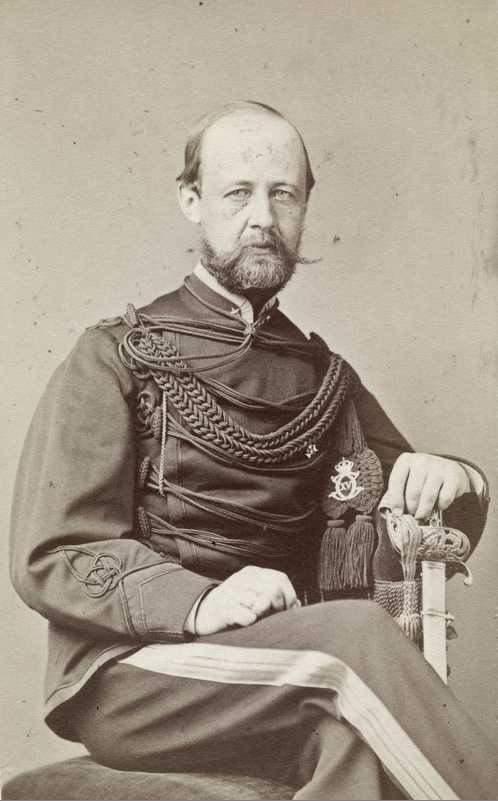
- Born: July 3, 1827
- Died: September 4, 1908 (aged 81)
- Military career
- Allegiance: Norway
- Branch: Norwegian Army
- Conflicts: First World War

Carl Georg With (3 July 1827 – 4 September 1908) was a Norwegian military officer. He was the Commanding General in Norway from 1884 to 1897.

== Biography ==
He was born in Christiania (now Oslo), Norway. He was a son of Martin Rasmus With (1788–1848) and Helle Alethe Ramm (1800–1885). In April 1855 he married Agnes Smith (1829–1917).

He attended the Norwegian Military Academy from 1844 to 1848 and the Norwegian Military College from 1849 to 1852; he also studied abroad in 1873 and 1877. He served both in the General Staff, the infantry and the cavalry. From 1867 to 1869 he was an aide-de-camp for King Carl XV, and from 1858 to 1905 he was a chamberlain at the royal court. He served as the commanding general in Norway from March 1888 to June 1897, having been acting Commanding General from September 1884. From December 1893 he was also inspector-general and leader of the Cavalry. He finally retired in March 1899.

He reached the ranks of second lieutenant in 1848, premier lieutenant in 1857, captain in March 1862, major in July 1864, lieutenant colonel in April 1872, colonel in September 1882, and major general in March 1887, lastly lieutenant general from January 1895. He was decorated with a silver medal from the journal Norsk Militært Tidsskrift for a good article in 1862.

Military offices
Preceded by	Commanding General in Norway; 1884–1897 (acting 1884–1888)	Succeeded by Hans Peter L'orange
