= Sven Furberg =

Norwegian biologist and professor

Sven Verner Furberg
- Born: Sven Verner Furberg; 16 April 1920; Sande, Vestfold, Norway
- Died: 15 March 1983 (aged 62); Oslo, Norway
- Education: Birkbeck College London (PhD)
- Known for: DNA structure; The Structure of cytidine
- Awards: Fridtjof Nansen Award of Excellence (1966)
- Scientific career
- Fields: Crystallography; Molecular biology; Chemistry
- Workplaces: University of Oslo; University of Montevideo; University of Bergen
- Thesis: An X-ray Study of Some Nucleosides and Nucleotides. (1949)

Sven Verner Furberg (16 April 1920 – 15 March 1983) was a Norwegian chemist, biologist, and crystallographer who first proposed a helical structure for DNA. Furberg suggested a single-chain helical structure in 1949, which he referred to as a "zig-zag" chain. In 1952, his structure of DNA was published in the journal Acta Chemica Scandinavica. In this paper, he deduced that DNA forms a helix from the crystal structure and density value of nucleosides and other related molecules. A year later (in 1953), this paper was cited by James Watson and Francis Crick in Molecular Structure of Nucleic Acids: A Structure for Deoxyribose Nucleic Acid.
