= Bjørn Jamtveit =

Norwegian geologist

Bjørn Jamtveit (born 1960) is a Norwegian geologist.

He was born in Notodden.

He became a professor of geology at the University of Oslo. During his time there, he was the director of the center of excellence Physics of Geological Processes.

Jamtveit received the Nansen Medal in 2010 and the Norwegian Research Council prize for excellence in research in 2012. He is also a fellow of the Norwegian Academy of Science and Letters and the Geochemical Society.

Jamtveit has been a deputy board member (for Anne Husebekk) of the Norwegian Academy of Science and Letters' Centre of Advanced Study and chairman of the Norwegian Academy of Science and Letters and Statoil's joint research program Vista.
