= Cystamine =

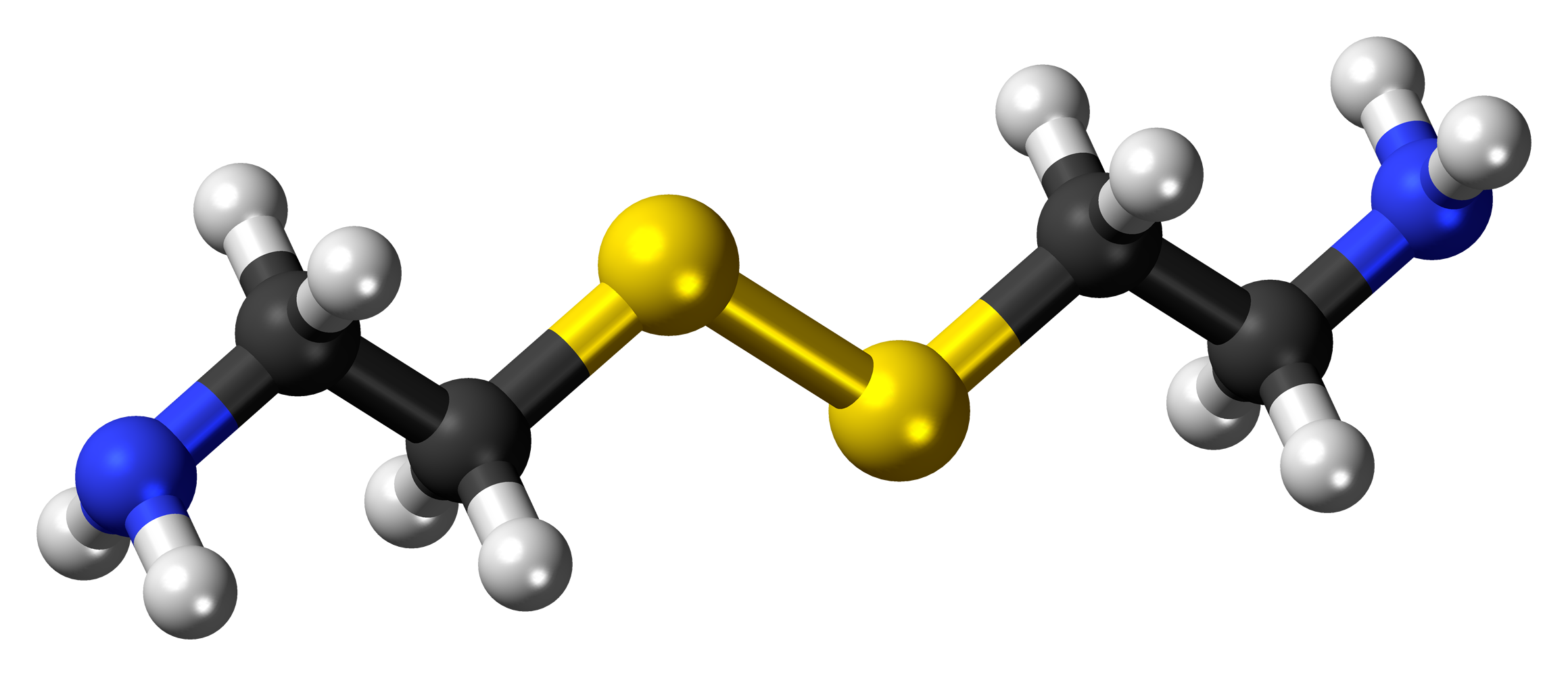

Names
- Preferred IUPAC name 2,2′-Disulfanediyldi(ethan-1-amine)
- Other names 2,2'-Dithiobisethanamine; 2-Aminoethyl disulfide Decarboxycystine

Identifiers
| CAS Number | 51-85-4 |
| 3D model (JSmol) | Interactive image |
| Abbreviations | AED |
| ChEBI | CHEBI:78757 |
| ChEMBL | ChEMBL61350 |
| ChemSpider | 2812 |
| ECHA InfoCard | 100.000.119 |
| PubChem CID | 2915 |
| UNII | R110LV8L02 |
| CompTox Dashboard (EPA) | DTXSID60199005 |
- InChI: InChI=1S/C4H12N2S2/c5-1-3-7-8-4-2-6/h1-6H2 Key: APQPRKLAWCIJEK-UHFFFAOYSA-N; InChI=1/C4H12N2S2/c5-1-3-7-8-4-2-6/h1-6H2 Key: APQPRKLAWCIJEK-UHFFFAOYAQ
- SMILES: S(SCCN)CCN

Properties
| Chemical formula | C_{4}H_{12}N_{2}S_{2} |
| Molar mass | 152.28 g/mol |
| Appearance | colorless oil |
| Density | 1.1156 g/cm^{3} |
| Melting point | 135–6 °C (275–43 °F; 408–279 K) |
| Boiling point | 105-6 5 torr |
| Solubility in water | Miscible |
| Solubility in Ethanol | Soluble |
- Except where otherwise noted, data are given for materials in their standard state (at 25 °C [77 °F], 100 kPa). verify (what is ?) Infobox references

Cystamine (2,2'-dithiobisethanamine) is an organic disulfide. It is formed when cystine is heated, the result of decarboxylation. Cystamine is an unstable liquid and is generally handled as the dihydrochloride salt, C_{4}H_{12}N_{2}S_{2}·2HCl, which is stable to 203-214 °C at which point it decomposes. Cystamine is toxic if swallowed or inhaled and potentially harmful by contact.

== Structure and synthesis ==
Cystamine is an organic disulfide which is formed when Cystine is heated as a result of decarboxylation. It is often used as sulfhydryl reagent, enzyme inhibitor and radiation-protective agent. Thiols can be synthesized to disulfides like cystamine through chemical oxidation with various oxidizing agents (molecular oxygen, metal ion, metal oxide, DMSO, nitric oxide, halogen and sodium perborate), through electrochemical oxidation and through borohydride exchange resin (BER)-transition metal salts systems (like BER-CuSo4).

== Uses ==
Cystamine dihydrochloride is a useful reagent to derivatize various polymer monoliths for hydrophilic interaction liquid chromatography, as a crosslinking agent in the development of polymer hydrogels, and as a functional group in nanoparticles developed for siRNA and DNA delivery.

It has also been studied as a potential radioprotective agent. It is found in the Soviet AI-2 "Aptechka" CBRN first-aid kit given to civilians.

Cystamine has also been studied as a potential medicinal compound in the case of Huntington's disease, Alzheimer's disease, carbon tetrachloride liver damage, and inhibition of erythrocyte sickling

== Interactions ==
Cystamine has been shown to bind reversibly with purified DNA in vitro, and imparts a radiation-protective effect to treated DNA. However, in vitro cell culture experiments on mammalian cells treated with cystamine failed to show a radiation-protective effect, whereas treatment with cysteamine did.

Furthermore, cystamine is also able to bind to nucleoproteins. The nucleic acids that form from binding to DNA are more stable than unbound nucleic acids. Binding of cystamine to nucleoproteins makes them precipitate. The disulfides than binds to DNA and precipitate nucleoproteins have an analogous interaction like cadaverine and spermidine with DNA. The affinity of cystamine to DNA plays a role in the toxicity and radioprotecting properties of cystamine.

Cystamine has also been shown to interact with the production of microtubule assemblies in bovine brain tissue. The interaction of cystamine interferes with the formation of microtubules, thus acting as an anti-microtubule at low concentrations. At high concentrations cystamine induces an abnormal tubulin polymerization. Five cystamine molecules can bind covalently to tubulin, this will cause mediated aggregation of tubulins.

== Toxicity ==
Multiple factors of potential cystamine toxicity have been described relating to hepatoxicity, anti-coagulant activity and skin sensitisation. LD50/48H values after intravenous administration have been described for rats (97 mg/kg of body weight) and mice (155.93 mg/kg of body weight).

Cystamine inhibits coagulation factor XIa and thrombin, Therefore, exhibiting anti-coagulant behavior. Furthermore, cystamine can cause liver damage by elevating cytosolic Ca^{2+} levels and subsequently activating a cytosolic proteolytic system. Skin sensitisation is a predicted effect of cystamine being a thiol.

== Metabolism ==
Cystamine in the body is reduced into cysteamine and RS-cysteamine mixed disulfide by thiol-disulfide exchange. This is done by consumption of intracellular glutathione. Cysteamine is oxidized to hypotaurine, which is performed by the enzyme cysteamine dioxygenase. Hypotaurine is oxidized to taurine by reactive oxygen species. Taurine is excreted out of the body or used in the body.
