= John Stuart Gray =

British-Norwegian marine biologist

John Stuart Gray (21 August 1941 – 21 October 2007) was a British-Norwegian marine biologist.

He was born in Bolsover, but migrated to Norway. After his PHD degree in 1965, he took the dr.scient. degree in 1976 and became a professor at the University of Oslo. He was a member of the Norwegian Academy of Science and Letters from 1980 and won the Fridtjof Nansen Prize for Outstanding Research in 1998.

Awards
Preceded by John Birks	Recipient of the Fridtjof Nansen Outstanding Research Award in Science; 1998	Succeeded by Kjell B. Døving
