= Hans Peter L'orange (officer) =

Norwegian military officer

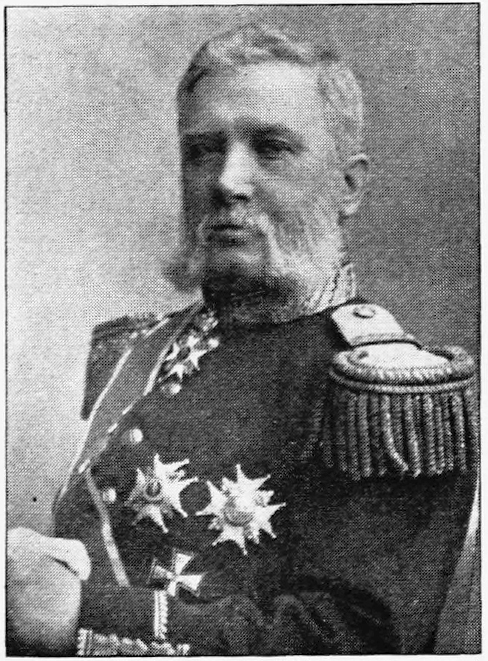
Hans Peter L'orange

Hans Peter L'orange (8 September 1835 – 1907) was a Norwegian military officer. He was the Commanding General in Norway from 1897 to 1903.

== Personal life ==
He was born in Herøy as a son of Peter Vilhelm L'orange (1806–1871) and Ingeborg Bue. He was a first cousin of Georg Fredrik Lorange and a second cousin of Anders Lorange. In November 1863 in Bergen he married Alvilde Rosalie Christiane Koren (1841–1929), a daughter of Johan Koren (1809–1885). He was the father of Major General Hans Wilhelm L'Orange (1868–1950) and Colonel Johan Ingolf Koren L'orange (1873–1949), and through the former a grandfather of archaeologist and art historian Hans Peter L'Orange.

== Career ==
He attended the Norwegian Military Academy until 1856 and from April to September 1857. He had reached the rank of premier lieutenant in 1857, and attended the Norwegian Military College before he was a brigade aide-de-camp in Bergen and from 1864 an apprentice in the General Staff. He was the leader of the Norwegian Military Academy from 1872 to 1885, and also lectured in topography and wrote the textbook Veiledning i Terrænget. He served in different places before and after his stint at the academy. He reached the ranks of captain in March 1867, major in July 1885, lieutenant colonel in January 1889, colonel in February 1891, and major general in April 1894, lastly Lieutenant General from July 1899. He became Chief of the General Staff in 1894, and from 1897 to his retirement in 1903 he served as the Commanding General of Norway. He was decorated with the Grand Cross of the Royal Norwegian Order of St. Olav in September 1903.

Military offices
Preceded by Carl Georg With	Commanding General in Norway; 1897–1903	Succeeded by O. Hansen
