= Danish Chemical Society =

Nonprofit organization for chemists

The Danish Chemical Society (Danish: Kemisk Forening) was founded in 1879. The nonprofit organization aims to advance the chemical sciences in Denmark.

By 1 November 2003, there were approximately 870 members. The revenue received from membership fees is the primary source of funding for the society's activities. The society consists of divisions including the Danish Society of Molecular Spectroscopy, the Danish Society of the History of Chemistry, the Danish Society of Environmental Chemistry, the Division of Organic Chemistry, the Division of Theoretical Chemistry, the Division of Inorganic Chemistry and the Danish Society of Analytical Chemistry.

The society has published articles in journals such as Acta Chemica Scandinavia and, since 2000, British journals including Dalton Transactions (Inorganic Chemistry) and Perkin Transactions (Organic Chemistry).
