= Francesca Biagini =

German-Italian mathematician

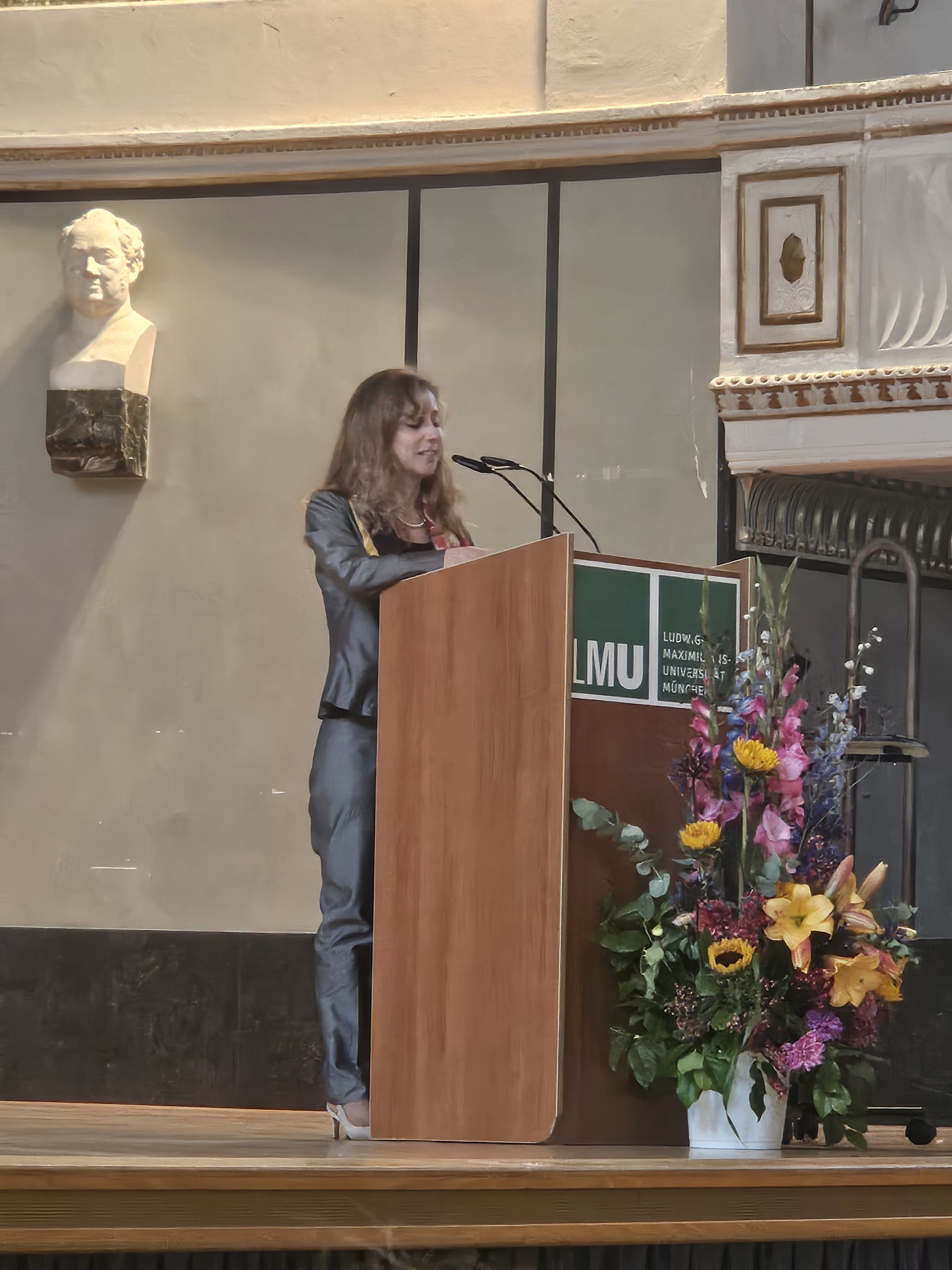
Francesca Biagini (2025)

Francesca Biagini (born 31 July 1973) is a German and Italian mathematician specializing in mathematical finance, stochastic calculus, and probability theory. Topics in her research include fractional Brownian motion and portfolio optimization for inside traders. She is a professor of applied mathematics and vice president for international affairs and diversity at LMU Munich, and president of the Bachelier Finance Society.

== Education and career ==
Biagini was a high school student in Pistoia, and earned a laurea in mathematics in 1996 from the University of Pisa, under the mentorship of Margherita Galbiati. She completed a doctorate in 2001 at the Scuola Normale Superiore di Pisa, with the dissertation Quadratic hedging approach for interest rate models with stochastic volatility supervised by Maurizio Pratelli.

She worked as an assistant professor at the University of Bologna from 1999 to 2005, when she moved to LMU Munich as an associate professor. After declining an offer to become a chaired professor at the University of Hanover in 2008, she was given a chair as full professor of applied mathematics at LMU Munich in 2009.

She became vice president for international affairs and diversity at LMU Munich, and is president of the Bachelier Finance Society for the 2020–2021 term.

== Books ==
With Massimo Campanino, Biagini is the coauthor of Elementi di Probabilità e Statistica (Springer, 2005), an Italian-language textbook on probability theory and statistics translated into English as Elements of Probability and Statistics: Introduction to Probability with the De Finetti's Approach and to Bayesian Statistics (Springer, 2016). With Yaozhong Hu, Bernt Øksendal, and Tusheng Zhang, she is the coauthor of the monograph Stochastic Calculus for Fractional Brownian Motion and Applications (Springer, 2008).

== Recognition ==
Biagini was awarded the Princess Therese of Bavaria Prize, an award for outstanding women scientists at LMU Munich, in 2019.
