= Ivan Rosenqvist =

Norwegian marine geologist

Ivan Rosenqvist (17 May 1916 – 8 October 1994) was an Austrian-born Norwegian geologist. He was born in Vienna. His research focus centered on marine sediments. He was appointed professor of mineralogy and geology at the University of Oslo from 1965 to 1984. During the German occupation of Norway, Rosenqvist had a central position in the clandestine intelligence organization XU.

Rosenqvist was a volunteer in the Winter War on the Finnish side.

Awards
Preceded by Lorentz Eldjarn	Recipient of the Fridtjof Nansen Excellent Research Award in Science; 1971	Succeeded by Per Andersen
