= Bjørg Cyvin =

Norwegian chemist

- Born: 1932
- Education: Norwegian Institute of Technology
- Awards: Fridtjof Nansen Prize for Outstanding Research
- Scientific career
- Fields: Chemistry
- Workplaces: Norwegian Institute of Technology

Bjørg Cyvin (born 1932 – died 2015 at age 82) is a Norwegian chemist and researcher.

== Early life ==
Bjorg Cvyvin (born Nygaard) was born February 8, 1932, in Alesund, Norway. Her father, Johannes Nygaard and her mother Ovidia Nygaard were married at Ålesund parish.

She had an older brother named Harald Nygaard who was born in 1928.

== Education and work ==
Bjørg Nygaard earned her diploma as a civil engineer in 1956 at the Department of Industrial Chemistry at the Norwegian Institute of Technology (NTH) in Trondheim.

The following year, she was employed as a researcher at the institute's Department of Industrial Chemistry. There she collaborated with, among others, the institute's founder and head, Olav Notevarp, on research into the connection between fatty acids in the diet and occurrences of arteriosclerosis and cardiovascular diseases. Among other things, they determined the importance of a diet rich in polyunsaturated fat.

In 1957, she married the chemist Sven Josef Cyvin (1931–2013), and took his surname.

The married couple were also research colleagues. Together with her husband and fellow researcher, she received the Fridtjof Nansen Prize for Outstanding Research in 1995.

She has been widely published, often in collaboration with her husband.

Some of her published work includes a book on Coronoid Hydrocarbons which she wrote with her husband Sven Josef Cyvin and another researcher named Jon Brunvoll.

She has 222 research publications while she was associated with Xiamen University and other places. Many were in collaboration with her husband and other researchers.
