= Peter Bastiansen (politician) =

Norwegian businessman and politician

Peter Ivan Lodtz Bastiansen
- Born: 20 September 1912; Vadsø
- Died: 13 April 1995 (aged 82); Bergen
- Parents: Alf Bjørnskau Bastiansen (father); Petra Christine Johanne Astrup (mother)
- Relatives: Otto Christian Astrup Bastiansen (brother)

Peter Ivan Lodtz Bastiansen (20 September 1912 – 13 April 1995) was a Norwegian businessperson and politician for the Communist Party.

He was born in Vadsø, and was the son of priest Alf Bjørnskau Bastiansen and brother of chemist Otto Bastiansen. After World War II he was a member of the central committee of the Norwegian Communist Party. He represented his party in Oslo city council from 1945 to 1948. In 1948 he relocated to Venezuela, and helped build the corporation Savoy Brands, one of the largest in the Venezuelan food industry.
