= Rikard Holmdahl =

Swedish physician and immunologist

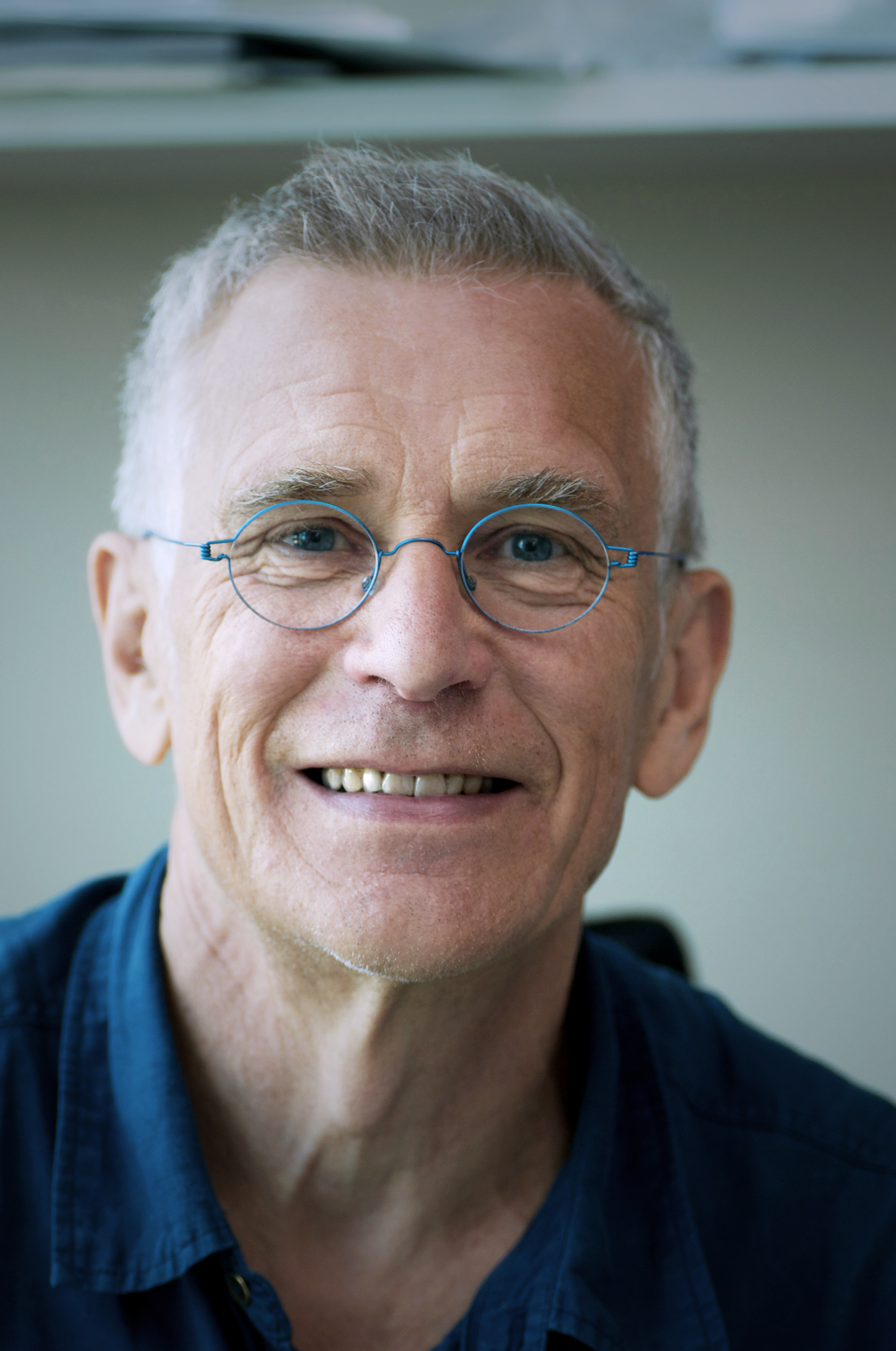
Rikard Holmdahl Swedish physician and immunologist

Rikard Holmdahl is a Swedish physician and immunologist. He was appointed as a full professor and the head of Medical Inflammation Research (MIR) unit at Lund University in 1993. In 2008, Rikard and his whole research group were moved to Karolinska Institute. His team was the first to discover and positionally clone a single nucleotide polymorphism at the Ncf1 gene causing susceptibility to autoimmune diseases such as Rheumatoid Arthritis in rat models. Rikard is an adjunct member of the Nobel Committee for physiology or medicine between 2016-2021 and was ranked 3rd among the top immunology scientists in Sweden in 2024. From January 2026, Rikard will be recruited to the Department of Medical Biochemistry and Microbiology, Uppsala University.

== Career ==
Rikard Holmdahl obtained his Doctor of Philosophy and Medical Doctor degrees at Uppsala University in 1985 and 1987, respectively. After his clinical residency training during 1988–1989, he started his research fellowship and was promoted as Associate Professor at Swedish Medical Research Council in 1990.

He became a full professor since 1993, and he is now the head of the MIR unit at Division of Immunology at Karolinska Institute (2008–present). He is also serving as visiting professor at Department of Medical Biochemistry and Microbiology, at Uppsala University since March 2025.

He was a member of the Nobel Assembly during 2014–2021 and an adjunct member of the Nobel committee for physiology or medicine during 2016–2021. He is also a member of the Royal Swedish Academy of Science since 2017.

== Awards ==
- 1994: The Göran Gustafsson prize in medicine, Swedish Royal Science Academy.
- 2002: The European Descartes prize “the most prestigious prize in medicine given by the European Community”
- 2003: The SalusAnsvar Nordic Medical prize.
- 2015: The Anders Jahre main scientific prize, "the most prestigious Nordic prize in medicine".
- 2015: The Yangtze River Scholar Award, "the highest academic award issued to an individual in higher education by the Ministry of Education of the People's Republic of China".
