= Arvid Kapelrud =

Norwegian biblical scholar

Arvid Schou Kapelrud (14 May 1912 - 23 October 1994) was a Norwegian professor, theologian and biblical scholar. He was noted for his research on the Old Testament prophet Joel and the religion of the old Ugarit.

== Biography ==
Kapelrud was born in Lillehammer in 1912. He graduated from the University of Oslo in 1938 with a degree in theology. Among his teachers were the Norwegian biblical scholar Sigmund Mowinckel. Kapelruds early research interest was with oriental languages, including the Babylonian Code of Hammurabi. He went to Uppsala in 1939, and returned after the war, where he continued his theological studies with the Uppsala-school of Biblical Studies. He completed his thesis on Joel in 1948, which he submitted to the Theological Faculty at the University of Uppsala. Later works include studies of Amos and Zephaniah.

In 1949-50 he went to the United States to undertake work at the Babylonian Collection at Yale University. In this period he collaborated with Albrecht Goetze. As a result of these studies he published Baal in the Raas Shamra Texts (1952), one of his more influential works. This publication was followed up by a companion volume, The Ras Shamra Discoveries and the Old Testament (1963), based on lectures given at the University of Oslo in the early 1950s.

In this period he also got involved with research on the Dead Sea Scrolls. Kapelrud returned to the study of Ras Shamra texts in the late 1960s when he published The Violent Goddess. Anat in the Ras Shamra Texts (1969).

In 1981, at the end of his career, he published God and His Friends in the Old Testament (1981). Kapelrud retired in 1982 after having served as Professor at the University of Oslo since 1954.

== Academic work and theories ==
Kapelruds main contribution to Biblical Studies is his work on the prophets and the ancient texts of Ras Shamra.

=== The Prophets ===
Kapelruds first major work was a treatise on the book of Joel. Kapelrud sees the book of Joel as a work of liturgy, closesly connected to the cultic context originating from the temple in Jerusalem. He also suggests a later dating of the book of Joel than his contemporaries, arguing for a possible date around the year 600 B.C.

In his discussion of Amos Kapelrud suggested that the prophet spoke from an ethical viewpoint, and that all nations were aware of the ethical standards of Yaweh. This universalism was, according to Kapelrud, a central idea in the book of Amos.

Kapelrud also studied other old testament prophets, such as Zephaniah. According to Fensham Kapelrud managed to throw fresh light on the prophecies of Zephaniah by suggesting that the prophet used the ideas of older prophets, such as Amos, in order to come up with new expressions.

=== The Ras Shamra texts ===
One of Kapelruds main interests was the study of the Ras Shamra texts, and the ancient Canaanite religion. He was of the opinion that there was a close connection between the Ras Shamra texts, which reflected Canaanite religion, and the text of the Old Testament. According to Merrill Kapelrud puts forward the theory that the goddess Anat and the god Baal are intimately related, and that there is a cultic context for the major Ras Shamra texts. Kapelrud also suggests an affinity between Baal and the Amorite storm-god Adad, also called Hadad. According to Kapelrud the Baal ritual and myth was celebrated annually.

== Published works ==
- Joel Studies (1948)
- Baal in the Raas Shamra Texts (1952)
- Central Ideas in Amos (1956)
- Dødehavsrullene (1956)
- The Ras Shamra Discoveries and the Old Testament (1963)
- Et folk på hjemferd (1964)
- Profetene i det gamle Israel og Juda (1966)
- The Violent Goddess. Anat in the Ras Shamra Texts (1969)
- The Message of the Prophet Zepaniah: Morphology and Ideas (1975)
- Job og hans problem i fortid og i dag (1976)
- God and His Friends in the Old Testament (1981)
- Han var ikke i stormen - det gamle testamente den gang og i dag (1984)

== See also ==
- Sigmund Mowinckel
- Canaanite religion
- Yale Babylonian Collection
