= Helge Julius Jakhelln Dyvik =

Norwegian linguistics professor

Helge Julius Jakhelln Dyvik (born December 23, 1947) is a Norwegian linguistics professor.

Dyvik was born in Bodø. After receiving a master's degree from the University of Bergen in 1972, he studied Old English and Middle English at Durham University in 1973, and then in 1976 received a master's degree in Nordic languages from the University of Bergen, where he also received his doctorate in 1983 with a dissertation in theoretical linguistics titled Grammatikk og empiri: en syntaktisk modell og dens forutsetninger (Grammar and Empiricism: A Syntactic Model and its Assumptions).

In 1987, Dyvik received the Fridtjof Nansen Award for Excellence. He has worked at the University of Bergen's Department of Linguistics, Literary, and Aesthetic Studies as a professor of general linguistics since 1983. He became a member of the Royal Norwegian Society of Sciences and Letters in 1995, the Norwegian Academy of Science and Letters in 1998, and the Academia Europaea in 2015. He has held various positions, including president of the Nordic Association of Linguists. He joined the Language Council of Norway in 2000.
