= Agnar Sandmo =

Norwegian economist (1938–2019)

Agnar Sandmo (9 January 1938 – 31 August 2019) was a Norwegian economist at the Norwegian School of Economics (NHH). He made a series of important contributions in the study of disparities, redistribution, insurance arrangements and tax systems.

He has written and published many economic articles throughout his career. From 1976 to 1980, he was a member of the Petroleum Price Board of the Swedish Government's Economic Commission and, from 1996 to 1997, of the Government Committee on Priorities in Health Care. He served as chairman of the Government Expert Committee on Investment Policies of the Petroleum Fund in 2004. Sandmo was affiliated with the SNF, a prominent research firm, he mainly did work on public economics and taxation. His research is not limited to but includes the overarching fields of economics of uncertainty, public economics, environmental economics and the history of economic thought. His articles have appeared in many prominent Economic journals. He had various positions, such as honorary doctor, at various universities.

== Awards, fellowships ==
- Fellow, Econometric Society
- Member of the Royal Swedish Academy of Sciences.
- Member of the Norwegian Academy of Science and Letters.
- Member of the Academia Europaea.

Awards
Preceded by Svein Magnussen	Recipient of the Norwegian Research Council Prize for Excellence in Research; 2002	Succeeded by Atle Kittang
