= Ragnar Knoph =

Norwegian jurist (1894–1938)

Ragnar Knoph (24 October 1894 – 25 December 1938) was a Norwegian jurist and professor of jurisprudence at the University of Oslo. He was born in Kristiania. Among his publications are Norsk arverett from 1930, and Åndsretten from 1936. He was an enthusiastic lecturer, and his works are regarded innovative and influential.
