= Lennart Eberson =

Swedish chemist (1933–2000)

Lennart Eugén Eberson
- Born: 5 January 1933; Malmö, Sweden
- Died: 1 February 2000 (aged 67); Malmö, Sweden
- Education: Lund University
- Known for: Organic chemistry; Electrochemistry
- Scientific career
- Fields: Chemistry
- Workplaces: Lund University

Lennart Eugén Eberson (5 January 1933 – 1 February 2000) was a Swedish chemist.

Eberson graduated with a Ph.D. degree in 1959 from Lund University with a thesis entitled "Studies in the Succinic and Glutaric Acid Series". From 1979 until his retirement in 1998, he was Professor of organic chemistry at Lund University. He authored several books, including the text books Introduktion till den organiska kemin (1965) and Organisk kemi (1970; 2nd edition 1977). He was elected to the Royal Swedish Academy of Engineering Sciences in 1974, and to the Royal Swedish Academy of Sciences in 1988.

== Family ==
Lennart Eberson was son of shop manager Ebbe Eberson and Margit Eberson, née Fardrup. Married in 1957 to Anne-Marie Hansson, daughter of accountant Hilding Hansson and Margareta Hansson, née Lundgren.

== Sources ==
- Vem är det : Svensk biografisk handbok 1997, Ed. Jill Salander Mortensen. Norstedts Förlag, Stockholm 1996 ISBN 91-1-960852-7 p. 249
