= Simen Skappel =

Norwegian historian (1866–1945)

Simen Skappel (7 March 1866 – 15 July 1945) was a Norwegian historian and statistician.

He specialized in agricultural history and agricultural statistics, and worked for Statistics Norway for 34 years, leading the Department of agricultural statistics for parts of that period. He was hired in Statistics Norway in 1902, was promoted to secretary in 1911 and department head in 1928. His most prominent publication was Om husmannsvesenet i Norge, published in 1922. A husmann in Norway was a type of crofter. In the book, Skappel distinguished between crofters who received some land in exchange for work, often on short-term contracts, and crofters who received land in exchange for rent, often on lifetime contracts. Skappel's theory has been discussed as late as around 2000, but has been found (by historian Ståle Dyrvik) models to lack important complexity. Other prominent works by Skappel include Hedemarkens amt 1814–1914 and Ringsaker Sparebank 1847–1927, but he mostly published in journals. He died in the summer of 1945.
