= Hans Peter L'Orange (academic) =

Norwegian art historian and archaeologist

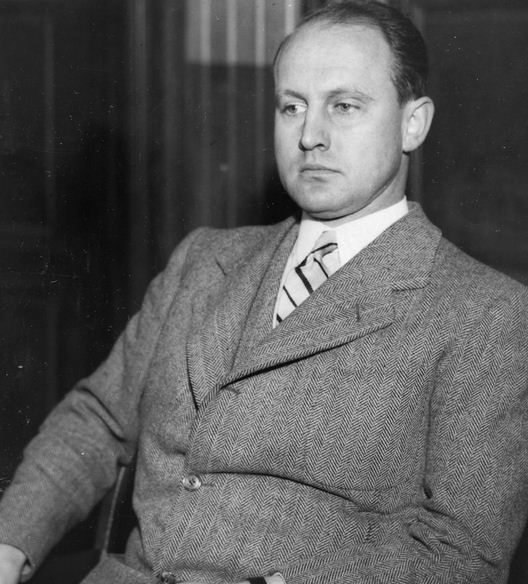
Hans Peter L'Orange

Hans Peter L'Orange (2 March 1903 – 5 December 1983) was a Norwegian art historian and classical archaeologist.

== Biography ==
L'Orange was born in Kristiania (now Oslo), Norway. He was a son of Major General Hans Wilhelm L'Orange (1868–1950) and Ginni Gulbranson (1879–1949). His family had its origin from among the French Huguenots. He was a paternal grandson of military officer Hans Peter L'Orange (1835–1907), maternal grandson of businessowner Carl August Gulbranson (1831–1910) and brother-in-law of journalist and writer, Gunnar Larsen (1900–1958).

From 1930 to 1936, he was a university fellow resident in Rome. He studied art history at the Ludwig-Maximilians-Universität München. He took the dr.philos. degree at the University of Oslo in 1933 with his thesis Studien zur Geschichte des spätantiken Porträts. He was a professor of classical archaeology at the University of Oslo from 1942 to 1973.

In 1959, he and professor Hjalmar Torp established the Norwegian Institute in Rome (Det norske institutt i Roma) as an affiliate of the University of Oslo. The institute established a permanent Norwegian base for research and studies of the Mediterranean countries. He was director of the institute until he retired in 1973.

He was a visiting professor at Harvard University (1950) and at Johns Hopkins University (1966–1967). In 1969, he was awarded the Arts Council Norway Honorary Award (Norsk kulturråds ærespris). He was awarded the Gunnerus Medal by the Royal Norwegian Society of Sciences and Letters in 1970.

== Selected works ==
- Apotheosis in Ancient Portraiture - 1947
- Keiseren på himmeltronen - 1949
- Romersk idyll - 1952
- Mot middelalder - 1963
- Romerske keisere i marmor og bronse- 1967
- Sentrum og periferi. Ni utvalgte essays - 1973

Awards
Preceded by Frits von der Lippe	Recipient of the Arts Council Norway Honorary Award; 1969	Succeeded by Alf Prøysen
