= Kai Grjotheim =

Norwegian chemist (1919–2003)

Kai Gudbrand Grjotheim (13 July 1919 – 17 April 2003) was a Norwegian chemist.

He was born in Åsnes as a son of school manager Erland Gudbrandson Grjotheim (1887–1969) and domestic science teacher Kaya Johanne Haarbye (1882–1963). He was married to Jorunn Synnøve Andersen since 1944. He finished his secondary education at Hamar Cathedral School in 1940, graduated from the Norwegian Institute of Technology with the siv.ing. degree in 1950. He was a research fellow from 1952 to 1955 and docent from 1955 to 1956 and 1957 to 1959. In 1956 he took the dr.techn. degree on the thesis Contribution to the Theory of the Aluminum Electrolysis, and from 1956 to 1957 he did research at the University of Toronto.

His fields were inorganic chemistry, physical chemistry, metallurgy and production of light metals. He is especially known for solving problems within thermodynamics of salt smelters and the aluminum electrolysis. He was a professor at the Norwegian Institute of Technology from 1959 to 1961 and 1969 to 1972, at the Technical College of Denmark from 1961 to 1969 and at the University of Oslo from 1972 to 1989. He had an honorary degree at the Shenyang University of Technology from 1980, was a guest scholar in several countries and was awarded several medals. He had a widespread cooperation with foreign scholars and penned over 300 academic articles. He was a fellow of the Royal Norwegian Society of Sciences and Letters since 1961, the Norwegian Academy of Technological Sciences since 1962, the Norwegian Academy of Science and Letters since 1968 and the German Academy in Berlin.
