= John Birks =

English botanist and paleontologist

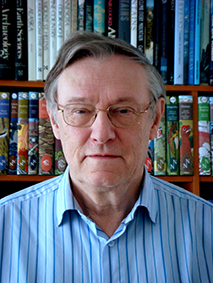
- John Birks in 2010
- Born: Harry John Betteley Birks; 12 January 1945 (age 81); Malvern, UK
- Education: University of Cambridge
- Spouse: Hilary Helen Birks née Lees
- Children: 1
- Awards: Bicentenary Medal of the Linnean Society of London (1982); Fridtjof Nansen Prize, Norwegian Academy of Science and Letters (1998); Lifetime Achievement Award, International Paleolimnology Association (2012)
- Scientific career
- Fields: Palaeoecology; Plant ecology; Botany
- Workplaces: University of Cambridge; University of Minnesota; University of Bergen; University College London
- Thesis: The Late-Weichselian and Present Vegetation of the Isle of Skye

Harry John Betteley Birks is a botanist and emeritus professor at the University of Bergen and University College London. He is best known for his work on the development of quantitative techniques in Quaternary palaeoecology. He has researched the vegetational and environmental history over the past 10–20,000 years in many parts of the world, including Fennoscandia, UK, Minnesota, the Yukon, Siberia, and Tibet.

== Early life, education, and career ==
Birks was born on 12 January 1945 in Malvern, UK. He was educated at Glasgow Academy and Latymer Upper School, London (1949–1958) and at Manchester Grammar School (1958–1963). He was a Taylor Scholar in Natural Sciences at Sidney Sussex College, Cambridge (1963–1966) and read the Natural Science Part I (Botany, Zoology, Geology, Biochemistry) and Part II (Botany) Tripos. He was awarded the Frank Smart Prize (1965) and Studentship (1966) in Botany. He completed his PhD thesis on “The Late-Weichselian and Present Vegetation of the Isle of Skye” at the University of Cambridge in 1969. He was a post-doctoral research fellow at the Limnological Research Center, University of Minnesota (1970–71, 1982) working with Herb Wright. He was elected a Research Fellow (1967–1971) and Fellow (1971–1984) of Sidney Sussex College. He was appointed Assistant in Research, Sub-department of Quaternary Research, University of Cambridge 1971, Senior Assistant in Research in 1973, and University Lecturer in Botany 1975. He served as a College Lecturer in Natural Sciences (1971 – 1984) and Tutor for Graduate Students (1977 – 1983) at Sidney Sussex. In 1984 he moved to the Botanical Institute (now Department of Biological Sciences), University of Bergen and was Professor of Quantitative Ecology and Palaeoecology until he retired in 2015. He was also ENSIS Professor of Quantitative Palaeoecology in the Environmental Change Research Centre, University College London 1993–2010. On retirement, he became Professor Emeritus in the Department of Biological Sciences, University of Bergen and Visiting Professor Emeritus at the Environmental Change Research Centre, University College London Birks held short-term visiting academic positions in Minnesota, Fairbanks, Kingston (Ontario), Toronto, Lund, Umeå, Abisko, Krakow, Utrecht, Bern, Innsbruck, and Oxford.

== Scientific research ==
Birks studied Quaternary pollen analysis, vegetational history, and plant ecology. He developed and applied numerical approaches in Quaternary pollen analysis with Allan D. Gordon and in palaeolimnology, notably in acid-rain research with Cajo ter Braak and climate reconstructions. Contemporary botanical research has been in community ecology, plant geography, and bryology. He has authored or edited 26 books and over 590 papers or book chapters. His principal mentors have been Harry Godwin, Frank Oldfield, Herb Wright, Ed Cushing, Derek Ratcliffe, and Michael Proctor. He has supervised over 35 doctoral students and over 30 master students and mentored more than 60 research visitors. He has taught botanical and numerical analytical topics within palaeoecology and ecology at the undergraduate and graduate levels.

== Awards and honours ==
- 1982 Bicentenary Medal of the Linnean Society of London
- 1987 Foreign Member, Norske Videnskaps Akademi (Norwegian Academy of Science and Letters)
- 1998 Fridtjof Nansen Prize, Norwegian Academy of Science and Letters
- 1998 Philosophiae Doctor Honoris Causa, University of Lund
- 2004 Honorary Fellow, Botanical Society of Scotland
- 2004 President's Prize, Botanical Society of the British Isles, for An Illustrated Guide to British Upland Vegetation
- 2010 Honorary Fellow, University College London
- 2012 Lifetime Achievement Award and Medal, International Paleolimnology Association
- 2014 Foreign Member (Geosciences Class V), The Royal Swedish Academy of Sciences
- 2016 Corresponding Fellow, Royal Society of Edinburgh (Earth Sciences and Chemistry Class)

In 2015, The Holocene published a Special Issue in honour of Birks entitled ‘At the frontiers of palaeoecology’ edited by Richard W. Battarbee, Anne E. Bjune, and Kathy J. Willis.

== Personal life ==
Birks married Hilary Helen Lees in 1966 and they have one child, Christopher (born 1972). Hilary is also a botanist and Quaternary scientist. Together they have explored arctic or alpine floras on all continents except Antarctica since 1965 and have a large collection of plant images taken on these expeditions.

== Selected publications ==
- Birks, H.J.B. 1973. Past and Present Vegetation of the Isle of Skye: a Palaeoecological Study. Cambridge University Press
- Birks, H.J.B. & Birks, H.H. 1980. Quaternary Palaeoecology. Edward Arnold
- Huntley, B. & Birks, H.J.B. 1983. An Atlas of Past and Present Pollen Maps for Europe: 0 13000 years ago. Cambridge University Press
- Birks & Gordon 1985. Numerical Methods in Quaternary Pollen Analysis. Academic Press
- Birks, H.J.B., Line, J.M., Juggins, S., Stevenson, A.C. & ter Braak, C.J.F. 1990. Diatoms and pH reconstruction. Philosophical Transactions of the Royal Society of London B 327: 263 278
- Ratcliffe, D.A., Birks, H.J.B. & Birks, H.H. 1993. The ecology and conservation of the Killarney Fern (Trichomanes speciosum Willd.) in Britain and Ireland. Biological Conservation 66: 231-247
- Birks, H.J.B. 1995. Quantitative palaeoenvironmental reconstructions. In: Statistical Modelling of Quaternary Science Data (eds. D. Maddy & J.S. Brew). Technical Guide 5, Quaternary Research Association, Cambridge, pp. 161–254
- Birks, H.J.B. 1998. Numerical tools in palaeolimnology - progress, potentialities, and problems. Journal of Paleolimnology 20, 307-332
- Smol, J.P., Wolfe, A.P., Birks, H.J.B. et al. 2005. Climate-driven regime shifts in the biological communities of arctic lakes. Proceedings of the National Academy of Sciences 102: 4397-4402
- Birks, H.H. & Birks, H.J.B. 2006. Multi-proxy studies in palaeolimnology. Vegetation History and Archaeobotany 15: 235-251
- Willis, K.J. & Birks, H.J.B. 2006. What is natural? The need for a long-term perspective in biodiversity conservation. Science 314: 1261-1265
- Birks, H.J.B., Lotter, A.F., Juggins, S. & Smol, J.P. (eds.) 2012. Tracking Environmental Change Using Lake Sediments. Volume 5: Data Handling and Numerical Techniques. Springer, Dordrecht
- Nogué, S., Santos, A.M.C., Birks, H.J.B. et al. 2021. The human dimension of biodiversity changes on islands. Science 372: 488-491.
