= Birger Kaada =

Norwegian physician and neurophysiologist (1918–2000)

Birger Rygg Kaada
- Born: 11 July 1918; Jørpeland, Norway
- Died: 30 January 2000 (aged 81); Stavanger
- Occupation: Physician
- Awards: Order of St. Olav

Birger Rygg Kaada (11 July 1918 – 30 January 2000) was a Norwegian physician and neurophysiologist.

Kaada was born in Jørpeland to merchant Theodor Kaada and Anna Rygg. He established the institution Nevrofysiologisk laboratorium in 1950, and was appointed professor of neurophysiology at the University of Oslo from 1959. He was a member of the Norwegian Academy of Science and Letters from 1958, and was decorated Knight, First Class of the Order of St. Olav in 1971. His experimental research focused on limbic and related structures, particularly the hippocampus and amygdala, using electrical stimulation and lesions in animal models to study somatic, autonomic and behavioural responses.
