= List of members of the Norwegian Academy of Science and Letters =

The Norwegian Academy of Science and Letters has about 880 members.

There are classes for Sciences and Letters, respectively, and also subgroups within them. The subgroups are further classified into so-called "ordinary members" and members over 70 years old, because 70 is the retirement age in Norway.

Members are elected to the society for lifetime. The maximum number of ordinary members is 140 Norwegian and 100 foreign members for the Mathematics and sciences class, and 110 Norwegian and 60 foreign members for the Letters class. Positions for new members are available when an ordinary member dies or passes the 70 years age limit.

== Sciences ==
=== Mathematics ===
Norwegian

- Fred Espen Benth
- Birgitte Freiesleben de Blasio
- Bjørn Ian Dundas
- Ingrid Kristine Glad
- John Grue
- Helge Holden
- Nina Holden
- Kenneth Hvistendahl Karlsen
- Eugenia Malinnikova
- Hans Munthe-Kaas
- Kristian Ranestad
- Nils Henrik Risebro
- John Rognes
- Håvard Rue
- Kristian Seip
- Karsten Trulsen
- Marit B. Veierød
- Paul Arne Østvær
- Ørnulf Borgan (over 70 years old)
- Geir Ellingsrud (over 70 years)
- Steinar Engen (over 70 years)
- Odd Magnus Faltinsen (over 70 years)
- John Erik Fornæss (over 70 years)
- Nils Lid Hjort (over 70 years)
- Arnfinn Laudal (over 70 years)
- Knut Liestøl (over 70 years)
- Tom Lyche (over 70 years)
- Dag Normann (over 70 years)
- Ragni Piene (over 70 years)
- Sverre O. Smalø (over 70 years)
- Erling Størmer (over 70 years)
- Dag Tjøstheim (over 70 years)
- Ragnar Winther (over 70 years)
- Bernt Øksendal (over 70 years)
- Odd Aalen (over 70 years)

Foreign

- Frédéric Dias
- Fedor Fomin
- Arnoldo Frigessi
- Avi Wigderson
- Douglas N. Arnold (over 70 years old)
- John Ball (over 70 years)
- David Ross Brillinger (over 70 years)
- Luis Caffarelli (over 70 years)
- Lennart Carleson (over 70 years)
- Elaine Cohen (over 70 years)
- Alain Connes (over 70 years)
- Pierre René Deligne (over 70 years)
- Ivar Ekeland (over 70 years)
- Björn Engquist (over 70 years)
- Hillel Furstenberg (over 70 years)
- Mikhail Gromov (over 70 years)
- Masaki Kashiwara (over 70 years)
- Steven Kleiman (over 70 years)
- Donald Knuth (over 70 years)
- Robert Langlands (over 70 years)
- László Lovász (over 70 years)
- Gregory Margulis (over 70 years)
- Yves Meyer (over 70 years)
- John Willard Milnor (over 70 years)
- David B. Mumford (over 70 years)
- John Nicholas Newman (over 70 years)
- Christian Peskine (over 70 years)
- Richard Riesenfeld (over 70 years)
- Larry L. Schumaker (over 70 years)
- Jean-Pierre Serre (over 70 years)
- Melvyn A. Shapiro (over 70 years)
- Yakov G. Sinai (over 70 years)
- Dennis Parnell Sullivan (over 70 years)
- Endre Szemerédi (over 70 years)
- Michel Talagrand (over 70 years)
- John G. Thompson (over 70 years)
- Howell Tong (over 70 years)
- Karen Uhlenbeck (over 70 years)
- S. R. Srinivasa Varadhan (over 70 years)
- Andrew Wiles (over 70 years)

=== Physics, astronomy and geophysics ===
Norwegian

- Arne Brataas
- Tor Eldevik
- Øystein Elgarøy
- Hans Kristian Kamfjord Eriksen
- Carmen Gaina
- Viggo H. Hansteen
- Christoph Heinze
- Morten Hjorth-Jensen
- Bodil Holst
- Ann-Cecilie Larsen
- Per Barth Lilje
- Anders Malthe-Sørenssen
- Cecilie Mauritzen
- Jøran Moen
- Knut Jørgen Måløy
- Alexander L. Read
- Bjørn Hallvard Samset
- Sunniva Siem
- Steinar Stapnes
- Asle Sudbø
- Trond Helge Torsvik
- Susanne Viefers
- Stephanie C. Werner
- László Pál Csernai (over 70 years)
- Oddbjørn Engvold (over 70 years)
- Arne Foldvik (over 70 years)
- Kristian Fossheim (over 70 years)
- Bjørn Gjevik (over 70 years)
- Alex Hansen (over 70 years)
- Øystein Hov (over 70 years)
- Hallstein Høgåsen (over 70 years)
- Ola M. Johannessen (over 70 years)
- Torstein F. Jøssang (over 70 years)
- Yngve Kristoffersen (over 70 years)
- Egil Leer (over 70 years)
- Jon Magne Leinaas (over 70 years)
- Johan E. Moan (over 70 years)
- Eivind Osnes (over 70 years)
- Hans Pécseli (over 70 years)
- Finn Ravndal (over 70 years)
- John Bernhard Rekstad (over 70 years)
- Per Arne Rikvold (over 70 years)
- Svein Sjøberg (over 70 years)
- Arne Torbjørn Skjeltorp (over 70 years)
- Jan K. Trulsen (over 70 years)
- Jan Erik Weber (over 70 years)

Foreign

- Conny Aerts
- Michael Edwards Brown
- Mats Carlsson
- David Charbonneau
- Deliang Chen
- Bart De Pontieu
- Winfried Denk
- Maria Godinho
- Mike C. Gurnis
- Stefan Hell
- David C. Jewitt
- Jane Luu
- Yuri Y. Podladchikov
- Sara Seager
- Amnon Aharony (over 70 years)
- Jens Aage Als-Nielsen (over 70 years)
- Boris Altshuler (over 70 years)
- James Roger Prior Angel (over 70 years)
- Gerd Binning (over 70 years)
- Guy Pierre Brasseur (over 70 years)
- Herbert C. Carlson (over 70 years)
- Jørgen Christensen-Dalsgaard (over 70 years)
- Sierd Cloetingh (over 70 years)
- John Culhane (over 70 years)
- Peter A. Davies (over 70 years)
- Donald M. Eigler (over 70 years)
- Ora Entin-Wohlman (over 70 years)
- Andrew C. Fabian (over 70 years)
- Ryoichi Fujii (over 70 years)
- Iouri Galperine (over 70 years)
- Christoph Gerber (over 70 years)
- Lars Gottschalk (over 70 years)
- David Gubbins (over 70 years)
- Bengt Gustafsson (over 70 years)
- Alan H. Guth (over 70 years)
- Maximilian Haider (over 70 years)
- Thors Hans Hansson (over 70 years)
- Sumio Iijima (over 70 years)
- Cecilia Jarlskog (over 70 years)
- Ondrej Krivanek (over 70 years)
- Andrei Linde (over 70 years)
- Ulf G. Lindström (over 70 years)
- Richard Lindzen (over 70 years)
- Paul Meakin (over 70 years)
- Holger Bech Nielsen (over 70 years)
- Per-Åke Nordlund (over 70 years)
- William Richard Peltier (over 70 years)
- John Brian Pendry (over 70 years)
- Michael John Prather (over 70 years)
- Eric Priest (over 70 years)
- Martin Rees (over 70 years)
- Harald Rose (over 70 years)
- Robert Rosner (over 70 years)
- Hans Thomas Rossby (over 70 years)
- Göran Scharmer (over 70 years)
- Robert F. Stein (over 70 years)
- Jan Olof Stenflo (over 70 years)
- Kip S. Thorne (over 70 years)
- Roger Ulrich (over 70 years)
- Knut Urban (over 70 years)
- Ewine van Dishoeck (over 70 years)
- Valerii Vinokur (over 70 years)
- Wang Wei-Chyung (over 70 years)
- Christos S. Zerefos (over 70 years)

=== Geosciences ===
Norwegian

- Elisabeth Alve
- Jostein Bakke
- Jørn Hurum
- Hope Jahren
- Bjørn Jamtveit
- Andreas Max Kääb
- Anna Nele Meckler
- François Renard
- Trude Storelvmo
- John Inge Svendsen
- Henrik H. Svensen
- Jemma Wadham
- Chong-Yu Xu
- Karin Andreassen (over 70 years)
- Knut Olav Bjørlykke (over 70 years)
- Anders Elverhøi (over 70 years)
- Jan Inge Faleide (over 70 years)
- Roy Helge Gabrielsen (over 70 years)
- Kaare Høeg (over 70 years)
- Eystein Jansen (over 70 years)
- Jan Mangerud (over 70 years)
- Bjørn Olav Mysen (over 70 years)
- Else-Ragnhild Neumann (over 70 years)
- Rolf Birger Pedersen (over 70 years)
- Ivar B. Ramberg (over 70 years)
- Per Aagaard (over 70 years)

Foreign

- Wim Spakman
- Bernhard Steinberger
- John T. Andrews (over 70 years)
- William Griffin (over 70 years)
- Stein Bjørnar Jacobsen (over 70 years)
- Suzanne Lacasse (over 70 years)
- Kurt Lambeck (over 70 years)
- Stephen Larter (over 70 years)
- Gifford H. Miller (over 70 years)
- Keith O'Nions (over 70 years)
- Suzanne O'Reilly (over 70 years)
- Kristín Vala Ragnarsdóttir (over 70 years)
- Olav Slaymaker (over 70 years)
- Scott B. Smithson (over 70 years)
- Hans Thybo (over 70 years)
- Peter Richard Vogt (over 70 years)
- Marjorie Wilson (over 70 years)
- Xia Jun (over 70 years)

=== Chemistry ===
Norwegian

- Knut J. Børve
- Chen De
- Mari-Ann Einarsrud
- Abhik Ghosh
- Tor Grande
- Unni Olsbye
- Kenneth Ruud
- Mats Tilset
- Rolf David Vogt
- Thomas Ebbesen (over 70 years)
- Helmer Fjellvåg (over 70 years)
- Knut Fægri, Jr. (over 70 years)
- Tyge Greibrokk (over 70 years)
- Trygve Ulf Helgaker (over 70 years)
- Per Hoff (over 70 years)
- Signe H. Kjelstrup (over 70 years)
- Karl Petter Lillerud (over 70 years)
- Elsa Lundanes (over 70 years)
- Truls Eivind Norby (over 70 years)
- Lars Skattebøl (over 70 years)
- Sigurd Skogestad (over 70 years)
- Leiv Kristen Sydnes (over 70 years)
- Einar Uggerud (over 70 years)

Foreign

- Paul Alivisatos
- Jürgen Gauss
- Kevin C. Jones
- Willem M. Klopper
- Chad Mirkin
- David Lawrence Allara (over 70 years)
- Odile Eisenstein (over 70 years)
- Hans-Heinz Emons (over 70 years)
- Georgiy V. Girichev (over 70 years)
- István Hargittai (over 70 years)
- Henning Hopf (over 70 years)
- Robert S. Langer (over 70 years)
- Claus Jørgen Nielsen (over 70 years)
- Bengt Nordén (over 70 years)
- Ralph Nuzzo (over 70 years)
- Bo Nyström (over 70 years)
- Jacob Sagiv (over 70 years)
- Reiner Salzer (over 70 years)
- Nadrian C. Seeman (over 70 years)
- Barry Welch (over 70 years)
- George Whitesides (over 70 years)

=== Biology ===
Norwegian

- Dag Lorents Aksnes
- Inger Greve Alsos
- Ottar Nordal Bjørnstad
- Anne Krag Brysting
- Hugo de Boer
- Bente Edvardsen
- Anders Goksøyr
- Dag Olav Hessen
- Rolf Anker Ims
- Kjetill S. Jakobsen
- Atle Mysterud
- Inger Elisabeth Måren
- Marit Reigstad
- Anne Gro Salvanes
- Vigdis Vandvik
- Leif Asbjørn Vøllestad
- Nigel Gilles Yoccoz
- Lise Øvreås
- Ingvild Austad (over 70 years)
- Arnoldus Schytte Blix (over 70 years)
- Christian Brochmann (over 70 years)
- Kåre Fossum (over 70 years)
- Odd Halvorsen (over 70 years)
- Ola M. Heide (over 70 years)
- Per Magnus Jørgensen (over 70 years)
- Thor Landsverk (over 70 years)
- Hanna Mustaparta (over 70 years)
- Inger Nordal (over 70 years)
- Stig William Omholt (over 70 years)
- Leif Ryvarden (over 70 years)
- Jan Raa (over 70 years)
- Tore Slagsvold (over 70 years)
- Nils Christian Stenseth (over 70 years)
- Jon Swenson (over 70 years)
- Bernt-Erik Sæther (over 70 years)
- Lauritz Sverdrup Sømme (over 70 years)
- Tron Frede Thingstad (over 70 years)

Foreign

- Hans Ellegren
- James Elser
- Winrich Freiwald
- Herwig Leirs
- Jan Mulder
- Göran Erik Nilsson
- Roger A. Pielke Jr.
- Loren H. Rieseberg
- Eörs Szathmáry
- Katherine J. Willis
- Zhang Zhibin
- Teuvo Tapio Ahti (over 70 years)
- Richard William Battarbee (over 70 years)
- Hilary H. Birks (over 70 years)
- John Birks (over 70 years)
- Edward P. Cunningham (over 70 years)
- Tom Fenchel (over 70 years)
- Else Marie Friis (over 70 years)
- John G. Hildebrand (over 70 years)
- Olavi Junttila (over 70 years)
- Charles J. Krebs (over 70 years)
- Yvon Le Maho (over 70 years)
- Björn Hadar Lindqvist (over 70 years)
- Walter Jami Lusigi (over 70 years)
- Geoffrey M. O. Maloiy (over 70 years)
- David Pegler (over 70 years)
- Tamás Pócs (over 70 years)
- Pierre Taberlet (over 70 years)
- Iain Thornton (over 70 years)

=== Cell and molecular biology ===
Norwegian

- Jan Terje Andersen
- Magnar Bjørås
- Heidi Kiil Blomhoff
- Vincent Eijsink
- Kristian Gundersen
- Terje Johansen
- Arne Klungland
- Vessela Kristensen
- James Bradley Lorens
- Ragnhild A. Lothe
- Hilde Loge Nilsen
- Kristian Prydz
- Anne Simonsen
- Kirsten Skarstad
- Harald Stenmark
- Kjetil Taskén
- Reidunn Aalen
- Haakon Breien Benestad (over 70 years)
- Trond Berg (over 70 years)
- Rune Blomhoff (over 70 years)
- Erik Boye (over 70 years)
- Anne-Lise Børresen-Dale (over 70 years)
- Stein Ove Døskeland (over 70 years)
- Terje Espevik (over 70 years)
- Anders Fjose (over 70 years)
- Sigbjørn Fossum (over 70 years)
- Odd Stokke Gabrielsen (over 70 years)
- Kaare Gautvik (over 70 years)
- Per Einar Granum (over 70 years)
- Karen B. Helle (over 70 years)
- Anne-Brit Kolstø (over 70 years)
- Per Eystein Lønning (over 70 years)
- Ingolf Figved Nes (over 70 years)
- Ørjan Olsvik (over 70 years)
- Olav Sand (over 70 years)
- Inger Sandlie (over 70 years)
- Kirsten Sandvig (over 70 years)
- Per Ottar Seglen (over 70 years)
- Reidun Sirevåg (over 70 years)

Foreign

- Kristian G. Andersen
- Cornelia Bargmann
- Phillippe Collas
- Nancy Kanwisher
- Li Peifeng
- Aurora Martínez
- Jacques Neefjes
- Ardem Patapoutian
- John Donald Scott
- Raymond Charles Stevens
- Doris Ying Tsao
- Mark Achtman (over 70 years old)
- David Ian Attwell (over 70 years)
- Dominique Aunis (over 70 years)
- R. John Collier (over 70 years)
- Ray Dingledine (over 70 years)
- Ford Doolittle (over 70 years)
- Ann Martin Graybiel (over 70 years)
- Gareth Griffiths (over 70 years)
- Angela Gronenborn (over 70 years)
- Carl-Henrik Heldin (over 70 years)
- David Julius (over 70 years)
- Tomas Lindahl (over 70 years)
- Jean-Louis Mandel (over 70 years)
- Linda K. Medlin (over 70 years)
- Gordon Bret Mills (over 70 years)
- Kenneth Nilsson (over 70 years)
- Bjørn Reino Olsen (over 70 years)
- James E. Rothman (over 70 years)
- Richard H. Scheller (over 70 years)
- Bo van Deurs (over 70 years)

=== Medicine ===
Norwegian

- Lars A. Akslen
- Mahmood Reza Amiry-Moghaddam
- Ole A. Andreassen
- Linda Hildegard Bergersen
- Farrukh Abbas Chaudhry
- Rebecca Jane Cox
- Niels Christian Danbolt
- Evandro Fei Fang-Stavem
- Marianne Fyhn
- Eva Gerdts
- Sigrun Halvorsen
- Åslaug Helland
- Eystein Husebye, Jr.
- Espen Andre Haavardsholm
- Jan Haavik
- Tom Hemming Karlsen
- Nina Langeland
- Karl-Johan Malmberg
- Edvard Moser
- May-Britt Moser
- Pål Rasmus Njølstad
- Johanna Olweus
- Torbjørn Omland
- Helga Refsum
- John-Arne Røttingen
- Truls Raastad
- Ludvig Sollid
- Anne Spurkland
- Camilla Stoltenberg
- Tone Tønjum
- Dag Erik Undlien
- Giske Ursin
- Pål Aukrust (over 70 years)
- Oddmund Bakke (over 70 years)
- Bjarne Bogen (over 70 years)
- Øyvind S. Bruland (over 70 years)
- Gro Harlem Brundtland (over 70 years)
- Stein Arne Evensen (over 70 years)
- Stig Frøland (over 70 years)
- Kenneth Hugdahl (over 70 years)
- Gunnar Husby (over 70 years)
- John Kjekshus (over 70 years)
- Hans Einar Krokan (over 70 years)
- Øivind Larsen (over 70 years)
- Terje Lømo (over 70 years)
- Gunnar Nicolaysen (over 70 years)
- Kirsten Kjelsberg Osen (over 70 years)
- Ole Petter Ottersen (over 70 years)
- Rolf Kåre Reed (over 70 years)
- Ola Didrik Saugstad (over 70 years)
- Ole Mathias Sejersted (over 70 years)
- Torstein Sjøvold (over 70 years)
- Erlend B. Smeland (over 70 years)
- Otto A. Smiseth (over 70 years)
- Johan Frederik Storm (over 70 years)
- Jon Storm-Mathisen (over 70 years)
- Marianne Thoresen (over 70 years)
- Per Magne Ueland (over 70 years)
- Lars Walløe (over 70 years)
- Ivar Walaas (over 70 years)

Foreign

- Emmanuelle Charpentier
- Jennifer A. Doudna
- Stephen V. Faraone
- Joel C. Glover
- B. Pontus Persson
- Lene Juel Rasmussen
- Janna Saarela
- Virginijus Siksnys
- Ursula Sonnewald
- Christopher A. Walsh
- Robert Zorec
- Ingemar Björkhem (over 70 years)
- Richard Steven Blumberg (over 70 years)
- Vilhelm A. Bohr (over 70 years)
- Kenneth R. Chien (over 70 years)
- Fitz-Roy Curry (over 70 years)
- Dusan Ferluga (over 70 years)
- Robert Fettiplace (over 70 years)
- Georgii P. Georgiev (over 70 years)
- Albert Gjedde (over 70 years)
- Gunnar Grant (over 70 years)
- Sten Grillner (over 70 years)
- Hans Hultborn (over 70 years)
- Tomas Hökfelt (over 70 years)
- Sirpa T. Jalkanen (over 70 years)
- Roland Jonsson (over 70 years)
- Pierre Magistretti (over 70 years)
- Eve Marder (over 70 years)
- Georg Friedrich Melchers (over 70 years)
- Michael Merzenich (over 70 years)
- Brenda Milner (over 70 years)
- Enrico Mugnaini (over 70 years)
- John O'Keefe (over 70 years)
- Harry T. Orr (over 70 years)
- Christine Petit (over 70 years)
- Rem V. Petrov (over 70 years)
- Marcus Raichle (over 70 years)
- Pasko Rakic (over 70 years)
- Kristofer Rubin (over 70 years)
- Carla J. Shatz (over 70 years)
- Shen Yucun (over 70 years)
- Anthony Smith (over 70 years)
- Johan Stenflo (over 70 years)
- Thomas C. Südhof (over 70 years)
- Prakash Narain Tandon (over 70 years)
- Menno Witter (over 70 years)
- Huda Zoghbi (over 70 years)

=== Technology ===
Norwegian

- Balpreet Sing Ahluwalia
- Anders M. Dale
- Thor Inge Fossen
- Odd Sture Hopperstad
- Inge Jonassen
- Deborah Oughton
- Kristin Ytterstad Pettersen
- Kristian Berg (over 70 years)
- Alf Bjørseth (over 70 years)
- Tor Helleseth (over 70 years)
- Eivind Hovig (over 70 years)
- May-Britt Hägg (over 70 years)
- Torgeir Moan (over 70 years)
- Odd Nakken (over 70 years)
- Brit Salbu (over 70 years)
- Hans Martin Seip (over 70 years)
- Eiliv Steinnes (over 70 years)

Foreign

- Valery Kashparov
- Maria Strømme
- John Hirth (over 70 years)

== Letters ==
=== History ===
Norwegian

- Camilla Brautaset
- Geir Hestmark
- Einar Lie
- Leidulf Melve
- Kari Aga Myklebost
- Olav Njølstad
- Hans Jacob Orning
- Veronique Pouillard
- Hilde Sandvik
- Fredrik Thue
- Odd Arne Westad
- Hilde Henriksen Waage
- Håkon With Andersen (over 70 years old)
- Astri Andresen (over 70 years old)
- Sverre Bagge (over 70 years)
- Ida Bull (over 70 years)
- John Peter Collett (over 70 years)
- Hans Fredrik Dahl (over 70 years)
- Knut Einar Eriksen (over 70 years)
- Narve Fulsås (over 70 years)
- Ole Kristian Grimnes (over 70 years)
- Tore Grønlie (over 70 years)
- Gro Hagemann (over 70 years)
- Lars Ivar Hansen (over 70 years)
- Guri Hjeltnes (over 70 years)
- Even Lange (over 70 years)
- Jan Eivind Myhre (over 70 years)
- Einar Niemi (over 70 years)
- Helge Pharo (over 70 years)
- Øystein Rian (over 70 years)
- Anne-Lise Seip (over 70 years)
- Jarle Simensen (over 70 years)
- Rune Slagstad (over 70 years)
- Øystein Sørensen (over 70 years)
- Rolf Tamnes (over 70 years)
- Hallvard Tjelmeland (over 70 years)
- Stein Tønnesson (over 70 years)

Foreign

- Patricia Clavin
- Kathleen Burk (over 70 years)
- Alexandre O. Chubarian (over 70 years)
- Anne Deighton (over 70 years)
- Michael Drake (over 70 years)
- Arthur E. Imhof (over 70 years)
- Hans Christian Johansen (over 70 years)
- Michael Jones (over 70 years)
- Paul Gordon Lauren (over 70 years)
- Gunner Lind (over 70 years)
- Odd S. Lovoll (over 70 years)
- Christian Meier (over 70 years)
- Göran B. Nilsson (over 70 years)
- Patrick Salmon (over 70 years)
- Bo Stråth (over 70 years)
- Rolf Torstendahl (over 70 years)
- Jay Murray Winter (over 70 years)
- Eva Österberg (over 70 years)

=== Culture, aesthetics ===
Norwegian

- Kristin Asdal
- Brita Brenna
- Annelin Eriksen
- Stanley Hawkins
- Ingjerd Hoëm
- Mari Hvattum
- Helge Jordheim
- Marianne Lien
- Iver B. Neumann
- Bjørnar Olsen
- Jill Walker Rettberg
- Brynjulf Stige
- Kristin B. Aavitsland
- Arne Bugge Amundsen (over 70 years)
- Jon-Roar Bjørkvold (over 70 years)
- Signe Horn Fuglesang (over 70 years)
- Sidsel Helliesen (over 70 years)
- Harald Herresthal (over 70 years)
- Bjarne Hodne (over 70 years)
- Arne Birger Johansen (over 70 years)
- Asbjørn Klepp (over 70 years)
- Siri Skjold Lexau (over 70 years)
- Hans-Emil Lidén (over 70 years)
- Øivind Lunde (over 70 years)
- Marit Melhuus (over 70 years)
- Even Ruud (over 70 years)
- Staale Sinding-Larsen (over 70 years)
- Dagfinn Skre (over 70 years)
- Bergljot Solberg (over 70 years)
- Arvid O. Vollsnes (over 70 years)
- Marit Werenskiold (over 70 years)
- Unni Wikan (over 70 years)

Foreign

- Penelope Harvey
- Bente Knold Kiilerich
- Lena Liepe
- Jan von Bonsdorff
- Mieke Bal (over 70 years)
- John Bergsagel (over 70 years)
- Barbara E. Crawford (over 70 years)
- Patrick Dinslage (over 70 years)
- Owain Edwards (over 70 years)
- Kirsten Hastrup (over 70 years)
- Lotte Hedeager (over 70 years)
- Christopher Henshilwood (over 70 years)
- Lise Bender Jørgensen (over 70 years)
- Erik Kjellberg (over 70 years)
- Friedhelm Krummacher (over 70 years)
- Saphinaz-Amal Naguib (over 70 years)
- Valentino Pace (over 70 years)
- David M. Wilson (over 70 years)

=== Philosophy, psychology ===
Norwegian

- Herman Wright Cappelen
- Unn Falkeid
- Anders Martin Fjell
- Andreas Føllesdal
- Olav Gjelsvik
- Kristin Gjesdal
- Thomas Kjeller Johansen
- Bruno Laeng
- Øystein Linnebo
- Reidar Maliks
- Michael Morreau
- Ole Frithjof Norheim
- Bjørn Torgrim Ramberg
- Espen Røysamb
- Camilla Serck-Hanssen
- Arne Johan Vetlesen
- Kristine B. Walhovd
- Lars Tjelta Westlye
- Henrik Daae Zachrisson
- Merete Glenne Øie
- Jon Elster (over 70 years old)
- Torgrim Gjesme (over 70 years)
- Vibeke Grøver (over 70 years)
- Jon Hellesnes (over 70 years)
- Tore Helstrup (over 70 years)
- Svein J. Magnussen (over 70 years)
- Nils Roll-Hansen (over 70 years)
- Bjørn Rishovd Rund (over 70 years)
- Gunnar Skirbekk (over 70 years)
- Jon Martin Sundet (over 70 years)
- Karl Halvor Teigen (over 70 years)
- Svenn Torgersen (over 70 years)
- Margarete Erika Vollrath (over 70 years)

Foreign

- Christian Beyer
- Finnur Ulf Dellsén
- Christel Fricke
- Agustín Rayo
- Tong Shijun
- Julia Annas (over 70 years)
- Lars Bergström (over 70 years)
- Eyjólfur K. Emilsson (over 70 years)
- Gail S. Goodman (over 70 years)
- Paul L. Harris (over 70 years)
- Jennifer Hornsby (over 70 years)
- Andrew J. I. Jones (over 70 years)
- Anthony Kenny (over 70 years)
- Patricia K. Kuhl (over 70 years)
- Andrew N. Meltzoff (over 70 years)
- Onora O'Neill (over 70 years)
- John R. Perry (over 70 years)
- Steven Pinker (over 70 years)
- Thomas Pogge (over 70 years)
- Dag Prawitz (over 70 years)
- Peter Railton (over 70 years)
- Samuel Scheffler (over 70 years)
- Timothy Williamson (over 70 years)

=== Literature ===
Norwegian

- Charles Ivan Armstrong
- Kjersti Bale
- Erik Bjerck Hagen
- Frode Helland
- Ingunn Lunde
- Elisabeth Oxfeldt
- Tore Rem
- Jørgen Magnus Sejersted
- Tone Selboe
- Liv Bliksrud (over 70 years old)
- Per Buvik (over 70 years)
- Jostein Børtnes (over 70 years)
- Erik Egeberg (over 70 years)
- Jorunn Hareide (over 70 years)
- Karin M. Holter (over 70 years)
- Jon Haarberg (over 70 years)
- Jakob Lothe (over 70 years)
- Toril Moi (over 70 years)
- Ellen Mortensen (over 70 years)
- Stein Haugom Olsen (over 70 years)
- Hans H. Skei (over 70 years)

Foreign

- Robert Crawford
- Hanna Meretoja
- Terence Cave (over 70 years)
- André Guyaux (over 70 years)
- Annegret Heitmann (over 70 years)
- Johnny Kondrup (over 70 years)
- Arne Melberg (over 70 years)
- Mitsuya Mori (over 70 years)
- Mary Kay Norseng (over 70 years)
- Vésteinn Ólason (over 70 years)
- James Phelan (over 70 years)
- Janet Rasmussen (over 70 years)
- Sandra Saari (over 70 years)
- Beatrice Sandberg (over 70 years)
- Stuart Sillars (over 70 years)
- Barbro Ståhle Sjönell (over 70 years)
- Johan Wrede (over 70 years)

=== Philology, linguistics ===
Norwegian

- Ante Aikio
- Ingrid Lossius Falkum
- Dag Trygve Haug
- Laura Janda
- Pia Lane
- Terje Lohndal
- Anastasia Maravela
- Unn Røyneland
- Kjell Johan Sæbø
- Marit Westergaard
- Øivind Andersen (over 70 years old)
- John Ole Askedal (over 70 years)
- Synnøve des Bouvrie (over 70 years)
- Leiv Egil Breivik (over 70 years)
- Jens Erland Braarvig (over 70 years)
- Tove Bull (over 70 years)
- Helge Dyvik (over 70 years)
- Kjersti Fløttum (over 70 years)
- Jan Terje Faarlund (over 70 years)
- Jan Ragnar Hagland (over 70 years)
- Ernst Håkon Jahr (over 70 years)
- Egil Kraggerud (over 70 years)
- Elizabeth Lanza (over 70 years)
- Fredrik Otto Lindeman (over 70 years)
- Ole Henrik Magga (over 70 years)
- Else Mundal (over 70 years)
- Svein Karl Mønnesland (over 70 years)
- Jan Erik Rekdal (over 70 years)
- Magnus Rindal (over 70 years)
- Kjell Ivar Vannebo (over 70 years)
- Geirr Wiggen (over 70 years)

Foreign

- Artemis Alexiadou
- Lutz E. Edzard
- Stephen J. Harrison
- Irene de Jong
- Andrew R. Linn
- Lars Boje Mortensen
- Robert Nedoma
- Guðrún Nordal
- Maria Polinsky
- Pia Quist
- Jason Rothman
- Roumyana Slabakova
- Wim Michiel Vandenbussche
- Monika Asztalos (over 70 years)
- Michael Patrick Barnes (over 70 years)
- Michael Benskin (over 70 years)
- Henning Bergenholtz (over 70 years)
- Helmut Birkhan (over 70 years)
- Kurt Braunmüller (over 70 years)
- Tatiana Chernigovskaya (over 70 years)
- Östen Dahl (over 70 years)
- François-Xavier Dillmann (over 70 years)
- Cathrine Fabricius Hansen (over 70 years)
- Christoph Harbsmeier (over 70 years)
- William Hardcastle (over 70 years)
- Lars Heltoft (over 70 years)
- Merle Horne (over 70 years)
- Minna Skafte Jensen (over 70 years)
- Ebbe Egede Knudsen (over 70 years)
- Jørn Lund (over 70 years)
- Marianne Mithun (over 70 years)
- Simo Parpola (over 70 years)
- Stanislaw Puppel (over 70 years)
- Bo Ralph (over 70 years)
- Suzanne Romaine (over 70 years)
- Pekka Sammallahti (over 70 years)
- Sven Teleman (over 70 years)
- Peter Trudgill (over 70 years)
- Boris Uspenskij (over 70 years)
- Rainer Voigt (over 70 years)

=== Jurisprudence ===
Norwegian

- Giuditta Cordero-Moss
- Halvard Haukeland Fredriksen
- Linda Gröning
- Trude Haugli
- Eirik Holmøyvik
- Jørn Jacobsen
- Dag Michalsen
- Anna Nylund
- Ole-Andreas Rognstad
- May-Len Skilbrei
- Christina Voigt
- Inger Berg Ørstavik
- Ragna Aarli
- Jan Fridthjof Bernt (over 70 years old)
- Erik Magnus Boe (over 70 years)
- Kirsti Strøm Bull (over 70 years)
- Svein Eng (over 70 years)
- Thor Falkanger (over 70 years)
- Hans Petter Graver (over 70 years)
- Gudrun Holgersen (over 70 years)
- Ola Mestad (over 70 years)
- Erling Chr. Selvig (over 70 years)
- Jens Edvin A. Skoghøy (over 70 years)
- Eivind Smith (over 70 years)
- Tone Sverdrup (over 70 years)
- Geir Ulfstein (over 70 years)
- Frederik Zimmer (over 70 years)

Foreign

- Katja Franko
- Henrik Palmer Olsen
- Andreas Paulus
- Xavier Philippe
- Bertil Bengtsson (over 70 years)
- Francis P. Delpérée (over 70 years)
- Torgny Håstad (over 70 years)
- Kirsten Ketscher (over 70 years)
- Peter-Christian Müller-Graff (over 70 years)
- Stig Strömholm (over 70 years)
- Kaarlo Tuori (over 70 years)
- Jozef van Langendonck (over 70 years)

=== Social sciences ===
Norwegian

- Grete Brochmann
- Alexander Wright Cappelen
- Scott Gates
- Kristian Skrede Gleditsch
- Siri Gloppen
- Bård Harstad
- Håvard Hegre
- Johannes Hjellbrekke
- Steinar Holden
- Cathrine Holst
- Jon Hovi
- Torkild Hovde Lyngstad
- Katrine Løken
- Halvor Mehlum
- Magne Mogstad
- Karen O'Brien
- Kjell Arne Røvik
- Kjell G. Salvanes
- Kjetil Storesletten
- Ragnar Torvik
- Jarle Trondal
- Bertil Tungodden
- Karen Helene Ulltveit-Moe
- Toril Aalberg
- Geir Asheim (over 70 years old)
- Ole T. Berg (over 70 years)
- Gunn Elisabeth Birkelund (over 70 years)
- Tom Christensen (over 70 years)
- Vidar Christiansen (over 70 years)
- Morten Egeberg (over 70 years)
- Finn Ragnar Førsund (over 70 years)
- Nils Petter Gleditsch (over 70 years)
- Sigmund Grønmo (over 70 years)
- Gunhild O. Hagestad (over 70 years)
- Bernt Hagtvet (over 70 years)
- Knut Heidar (over 70 years)
- Ottar Hellevik (over 70 years)
- Gudmund Hernes (over 70 years)
- Michael Hoel (over 70 years)
- Stein Kuhnle (over 70 years)
- Finn E. Kydland (over 70 years)
- Per Lægreid (over 70 years)
- Raino Malnes (over 70 years)
- Arne Mastekaasa (over 70 years)
- Lars Mjøset (over 70 years)
- Kalle Moene (over 70 years)
- Johan P. Olsen (over 70 years)
- Willy Pedersen (over 70 years)
- Trond Petersen (over 70 years)
- Bjørn Erik Rasch (over 70 years)
- Bernt P. Stigum (over 70 years)
- Kaare Strøm (over 70 years)
- Steinar Strøm (over 70 years)
- Bernt Aardal (over 70 years)

Foreign

- Józef Batora
- Annick Prieur
- Peter Hedström (over 70 years)
- Richard Ling (over 70 years)
- Sabrina P. Ramet (over 70 years)
- Björn S. Stefánsson (over 70 years)

=== Religion, theology ===
Norwegian

- Knut Axel Jacobsen
- Siv Ellen Kraft
- Liv Ingeborg Lied
- Hugo Lundhaug
- Michael Stausberg
- Terje Stordalen
- Aud Valborg Tønnessen
- Jorunn Økland
- Svein Aage Christoffersen (over 70 years)
- Ingvild Sælid Gilhus (over 70 years)
- Per Kværne (over 70 years)
- Halvor Moxnes (over 70 years)
- Håkan Rydving (over 70 years)
- Karl Olav Sandnes (over 70 years)
- Oskar Skarsaune (over 70 years)
- Gro Steinsland (over 70 years)
- Einar Thomassen (over 70 years)

Foreign

- Christoph Markschies
- Jayne Svenungsson
- David E. Aune (over 70 years old)
- John Barton (over 70 years)
- Niels Jørgen Cappelørn (over 70 years)
- Troels Engberg-Pedersen (over 70 years)
- Nils Hellholm (over 70 years)
- Ingun Montgomery (over 70 years)
- Samuel Rubenson (over 70 years)
- Einar Sigurbjörnsson (over 70 years)
- Rudolf Smend (over 70 years)
- Reinhart Staats (over 70 years)
