= Leiv Egil Breivik =

Norwegian linguist

Leiv Egil Breivik (born 6 June 1944) is a Norwegian linguist.

He graduated from the University of Bergen with the cand.philol. degree in 1971. He continued doing research there until 1974, and then for two years at the University College London. Breivik was employed at the University of Tromsø in 1976, was promoted to professor in 1980 and took the dr.philos. degree in 1982. He was later a professor of English linguistics at the University of Bergen from 1988 to his retirement, as well as an adjunct professor at the University of Tromsø from 1994 and 2003.

He was a dean at both universities. Breivik was also a visiting scholar/professor in Vienna and London in 1991, Bloomsburg (1999), Vienna again (2000), Carolina (2002), Western Australia (2002–03) and Santiago de Compostela (2004). Works for which he is known include "On the interpretation of existential there" (Language, 1981), Exististential there: A synchronic and diacronic study (1990) and Language Change: Contributions to the study of its causes (co-editor, 1989).

Chairing the Norwegian Association of Applied Linguistics from 1984 to 2000, he was also a representative in the International Association of Applied Linguistics. He was inducted into the Norwegian Academy of Science and Letters in 1993.

He was married to fellow linguist Toril Swan (1945–2022).

== See also ==
- Dummy pronoun#Existential there
