= Wellbeing economy =

Public policy framework

Wellbeing economy is a public policy framework in which the economy is designed to serve social, health, cultural, equity and nature outcomes. The aim is to go beyond gross domestic product (GDP) as the main measure of national economic performance. Since the early 2000s there has been growing interest in wellbeing as a framework in research, measurement and policy.

== National and international adoption ==
A number of countries have introduced wellbeing metrics to guide public policy decision-making and inform budgetary processes with a focus on education and skills, health, gender and inclusion. The approach has been adopted as national policy in a number of countries including Scotland, New Zealand, Iceland, Wales, Finland and Canada which established the Wellbeing Economy Governments partnership (WEGo) in 2021.

Intergovernmental organisations such as the World Health Organization (WHO) have also adopted wellbeing as a whole-of-government approach to meet complex social, environmental and public health challenges. This was first articulated in 2021 with the adoption of the Geneva Charter for Wellbeing. and in May 2023 the WHO Assembly adopted A global framework for integrating well-being into public health utilizing a health promotion approach.

The Wellbeing Economy Alliance (WEAll) is the leading collaboration of organisations, alliances, movements and individuals working towards a Wellbeing Economy. WEAll was born in 2018 as a time-bound project to catalyse a transition towards a Wellbeing Economy by promoting radical connection and collaboration between different actors of the new economy ecosystem, so they can achieve impact larger than the sum of their parts.

Ambassadors of the Wellbeing Economy Alliance include: Bayo Akomolafe, James Gustave Speth, Darrick Hamilton, Sophie Howe, Katherine Trebeck, Abdul El-Sayed, Ayabonga Cawe, Carolina Urrutia Vásquez, Christian Felber, David Korten, Giancarlo Pucci, Jason Hickel, Kate Pickett, Kate Raworth, Kristin Vala Ragnarsdottir, Lebohang Liepollo Pheko, Neva Goodwin, Pedro Tarak, Dirk Philipsen, Peter Blom, Rajiv Joshi, Richard Wilkinson, Robert Costanza, Sandrine Dixson-Decleve, Sharan Burrow, Tim Jackson, Bill McKibben, Victor Mochkofsky, and Michael Mezzatesta.

== Well-being washing ==
Well-being washing or WW (a compound word modeled on "whitewashing") is a form of advertising or marketing spin that deceptively uses public relations and platitudes to persuade the public that an entity cares about employee health and well-being. In place of genuine support, superficial gestures like one-off yoga classes, talks, or perks are offered that don't address underlying issues like excess hours, lack of autonomy, and work-life balance. Well-being washing may attempt to remediate the symtpoms of an organization without addressing the underlying root cause.

Well-being washing coincides with the rise of green-washing and the emergence of the wellbeing economy.

== Notable examples ==
=== New Zealand ===
New Zealand was a pioneer in this space. In May 2019, under Jacinda Ardern's Labour Government, New Zealand launched the country’s first Wellbeing Budget, which committed to putting people’s wellbeing and the environment at the heart of its policies. Rather than focus solely on GDP, they picked five priority areas: climate and environment, productive work, Māori and Pacific opportunities, child wellbeing, and mental and physical health.

Prime Minister Ardern stated: “The purpose of government spending is to ensure citizens’ health and life satisfaction, and that — not wealth or economic growth — is the metric by which a country’s progress should be measured. GDP alone does not guarantee improvement to our living standards and does not take into account who benefits and who is left out.”

The approach was scraped by the subsequent National-led coalition government in 2024.

New Zealand has an active hub of the Wellbeing Economy Alliance, called Wellbeing Economy Alliance Aotearoa New Zealand (WEAll Aotearoa NZ). On their website WEAll Aotearoa describe themselves as "a non-partisan and independent ‘think and do’ tank working to redesign Aotearoa New Zealand’s economy around the wellbeing of our people and te taiao. We use an evidence-informed approach and focus upstream to develop practical, long-term solutions for the public good."

== Public opinion ==
A survey made by Ipsos for the organization Earth4All in 17 of the G20 countries, found that 68% of the respondents support prioritizing wellbeing over profit.

== See also ==
- Happiness economics
- Quality of life
- Sophie Howe
