= Ingun Montgomery =

Swedish theologian

Ingun Montgomery (born 14 April 1936 - 4 September 2026) was a Swedish theologian. She moved to Norway where she became the first female professor of theology.

She was born in Uppsala, and took the cand.theol. degree at Uppsala University in 1962. Following her lic.theol. degree in 1966, she was a research fellow at the University of Bergen from 1971. With the doctoral thesis Värjostånd och lärostånd, she took the dr.philos. degree there in 1972 and was promoted to associate professor.

In 1977 she was appointed professor of church history at Uppsala University. She moved to the same position at the University of Oslo in 1979, becoming Norway's first female professor of theology. She was a fellow of the Norwegian Academy of Science and Letters. In 1997 she received an honorary degree at the University of Helsinki.

== Festschrift ==
- Jensen, Roger, Dag Thorkildsen og Aud Valborg Tønnessen (eds.): Kirke, protestantisme og samfunn: Festskrift til professor dr. Ingun Montgomery, Trondheim: Tapir Akademisk, 2006. ISBN 8251921171
