= Kjell Ivar Vannebo =

Norwegian linguist

Kjell Ivar Vannebo (born 18 July 1938) is a Norwegian linguist.

He was born in Overhalla as a son of a banker. He graduated from the University of Oslo with the cand.philol. degree in 1966 with the thesis Aksjonsart i norsk. Ein syntaktisk funksjonsanalyse, and was soon hired as a lecturer at Stockholm University in 1967. From 1970 he was a lecturer at the University of Oslo, where he finished the dr.philos. degree in 1978 with the thesis Tempus og tidsreferanse. Tidsdeiksis i norsk. He was promoted to docent in 1984 and professor of Nordic linguistics in 1985.

In addition to the works about grammar, which includes the reference grammar Norsk referansegrammatikk which he wrote with Jan Terje Faarlund and Svein Lie, Vannebo is a known lexicographer and wrote a book about written literacy in the 1800s, En nasjon av skriveføre (1984).

He was a member of the Language Council of Norway from 2000 to 2004 and edited Maal og minne from 1996 to 2005. He was inducted into the Norwegian Academy of Science and Letters in 1990 and the Royal Norwegian Society of Sciences and Letters in 1997.
