= Gloppen =

Gloppen may refer to:

== People ==
- Siri Gloppen (born 1964), a Norwegian political scientist
- Helene Gloppen (born 1993), a Norwegian football player

== Places ==
- Gloppen Municipality, a municipality in Vestland county, Norway
- Gloppen or Gloppefjorden, a fjord in Vestland county, Norway

== Other ==
- Gloppen FIL, a sports club based in Gloppen Municipality in Vestland county, Norway
