= Kjersti =

Kjersti is a Norwegian feminine given name, a Norwegian form of Christina. Notable people with the given name include:

- Kjersti Alveberg (born 1948), Norwegian choreographer and dancer
- Kjersti Bale (born 1959), Norwegian philologist
- Kjersti Beck (born 1979), Norwegian handball player
- Kjersti Buaas (born 1982), Norwegian snowboarder
- Kjersti Døvigen (1943–2021), Norwegian actress
- Kjersti Engan (born 1971), Norwegian researcher in signal and image processing
- Kjersti Ericsson (born 1944), Norwegian psychologist, criminologist, writer, poet and former politician
- Kjersti Fløttum (born 1953), Norwegian linguist
- Kjersti Graver (1945–2009), Norwegian jurist
- Kjersti Grini (born 1971), Norwegian handball player
- Kjersti Holmen (born 1956), Norwegian actress
- Kjersti Horn (born 1977), Norwegian theater director and storyboard artist
- Kjersti Markusson (born 1955), Norwegian politician
- Kjersti Plätzer (born 1972), Norwegian race walker
- Kjersti Reenaas (born 1981), Norwegian ski-orienteering competitor
- Kjersti Scheen (1943–2026), Norwegian journalist, writer and illustrator
- Kjersti Annesdatter Skomsvold (born 1979), Norwegian author
- Kjersti Løken Stavrum (born 1969), Norwegian journalist and editor
- Kjersti Stenseng (born 1974), Norwegian politician
- Kjersti Stubø (born 1970), Norwegian vocalist
- Kjersti Thun (born 1974), Norwegian soccer player
- Kjersti Toppe (born 1967), Norwegian politician
