= Valerii Vinokur =

Condensed matter physicist

- Born: April 26, 1949 (age 77)
- Died: December 16, 2025 (aged 76)
- Citizenship: United States
- Education: Institute of Solid State Physics (Russia)
- Scientific career
- Fields: Condensed matter physics
- Workplaces: Argonne National Laboratory; University of Chicago
- Website: www.anl.gov/profile/valerii-vinokour

Valerii Vinokur (also spelled as Vinokour, or Valery Vinokour; 26 April 1949 — 16 December 2025) was a condensed matter physicist who worked on superconductivity, the physics of vortices, disordered media and glasses, nonequilibrium physics of dissipative systems, quantum phase transitions, quantum thermodynamics, and topological quantum matter. He was a senior scientist and Argonne Distinguished Fellow at Argonne National Laboratory and a senior scientist at the Consortium for Advanced Science and Engineering, Office of Research and National Laboratories, The University of Chicago. He was a Foreign Member of the National Norwegian Academy of Science and Letters and a Fellow of the American Physical Society.

== Career ==
Vinokur earned his BSc in physics of metals at Moscow Institute of Steel and Alloys in 1972 and moved to the Institute of Solid State Physics, Chernogolovka, Russia, where he received a Ph.D. in physics in 1979. He has held appointments as a visiting scientist at CNRS, Grenoble (1987), a visiting scientist at Leiden University (1989), a visiting scientist at ETH (Zurich) (1990), and as visiting director of research at Ecole Normale Superieure (Paris) (1996). Since 1990 till January 2021 Vinokur has worked at the Argonne National Laboratory, having become a Distinguished Argonne Fellow in 2009. Since 2018 till January 2021, he has been a senior scientist at the Consortium for Advanced Science and Engineering, Office of Research and National Laboratories, The University of Chicago. Since January 2021 Vinokur has been working for Terra Quantum AG as a Chief Technology Officer US. Since January 2021 Vinokur also has been an adjunct professor at City College of the City University of New York.

== Honors, awards and fellowships ==
- Fellow of the American Physical Society, 1998
- University of Chicago Distinguished Performance Award, 1998
- John Bardeen Prize, 2003
- Alexander von Humboldt Research Award, 2003
- Foreign Member of the Norwegian National Academy of Letters and Science, 2013
- Alexander von Humboldt Research Award, 2013
- International Abrikosov Prize, 2017
- Fritz London Memorial Prize, 2020
