= Veierød =

Veierød is a Norwegian surname. Notable people with the surname include:

- Marit Veierød, Norwegian biostatistician and epidemiologist
- Tom Veierød (born 1937), Norwegian civil servant
- Tove Veierød (born 1940), Norwegian politician
