= Kjerstin =

Kjerstin is the given name of:

- Kjerstin Andersen (born 1958), Norwegian former team handball goalkeeper
- Kjerstin Askholt (born 1962), Norwegian civil servant, former governor of Svalbar
- Kjerstin Braathen (born 1970), Norwegian CEO
- Kjerstin Dellert (1925–2018), Swedish opera singer and theatre manager
- Kjerstin Wøyen Funderud (born 1970), Norwegian politician
- Kjerstin Øvrelid (1929–1989), Norwegian painter
- Kjerstin Boge Solås (born 1997), Norwegian handball player

== See also ==
- Kjersti, another given name
