= Pierre Magistretti =

Italian-Swiss physician and neuroscientist (born 1952)

Professor Pierre Julius Magistretti
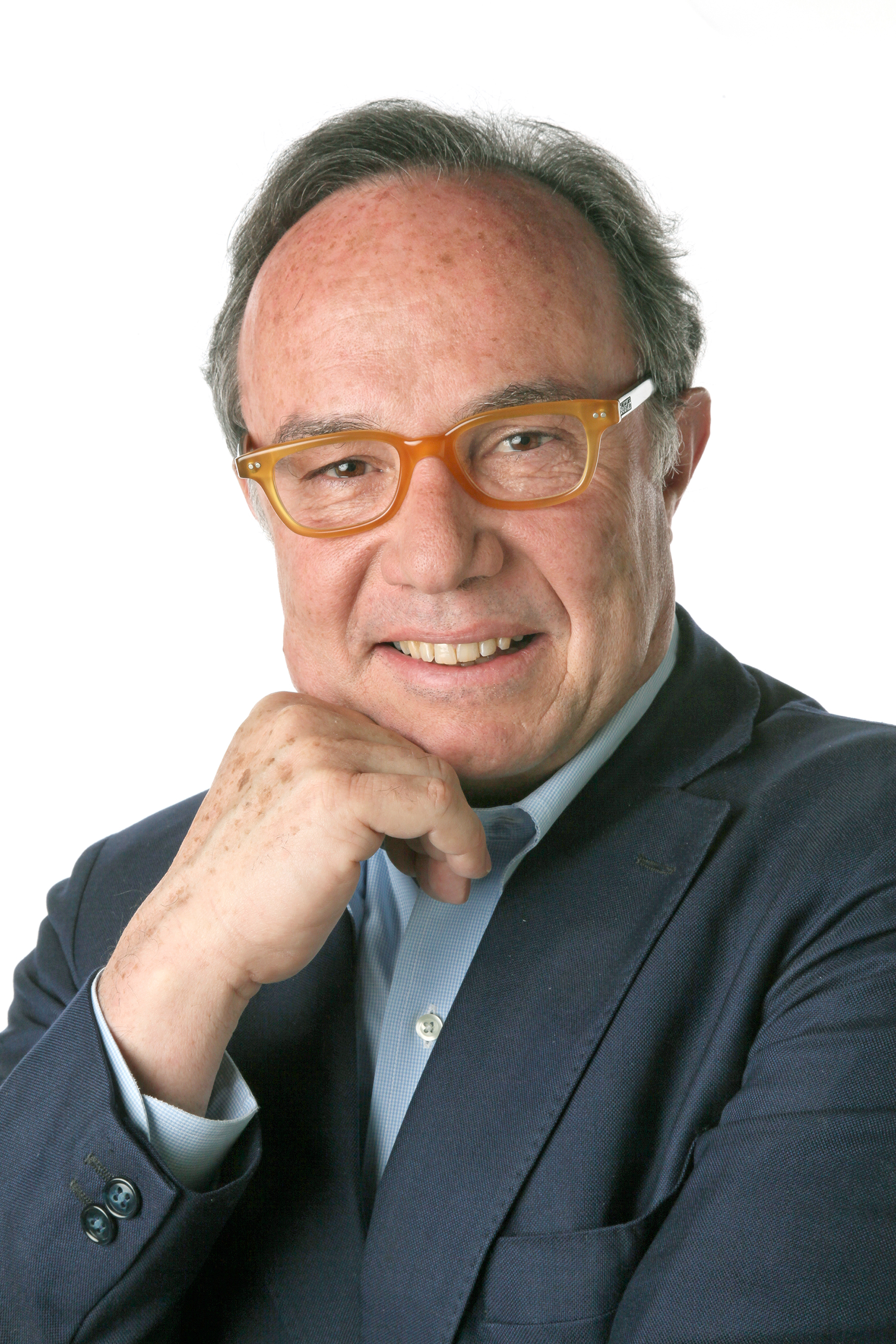
- Pierre J. Magistretti in 2017
- Born: 1952 (age 73–74); Milan, Italy
- Citizenship: Italy; Switzerland
- Known for: Glia cells metabolism
- Awards: IPSEN Foundation Prize; Camillo Golgi Medal Award; Goethe Award for Psychoanalytic and Psychodynamic Scholarship

Academic background
- Education: Medicine; Neuroscience, University of Geneva; University of California, San Diego
- Thesis: Vasoactive Intestinal Polypeptide: A Regulator of Cellular Homeostasis in Cerebral Cortex (1982)
- Doctoral advisor: Floyd E. Bloom; William Shoemaker
- Other advisor: Ralph Straub

Academic work
- Discipline: Neuroscience
- Sub-discipline: Metabolism of glia cells
- Institutions: EPFL (École Polytechnique Fédérale de Lausanne); KAUST
- Main interests: Brain metabolism Glia cells
- Website: https://people.epfl.ch/pierre.magistretti

Pierre J. Magistretti (born 1952 in Milan, Italy) is an Italian and Swiss neuroscientist and physician. He is a professor emeritus of neuroscience at EPFL (École Polytechnique Fédérale de Lausanne; until 2017), University of Geneva (until 2017) and University of Lausanne (until 2018). Until 2012, he was the director of the EPFL's Brain Mind Institute and director of the Center for Psychiatric Neuroscience of the University of Lausanne and Lausanne University Hospital. Since 2012 he has been distinguished professor at King Abdullah University of Science and Technology where he was dean of the division of biological and environmental sciences and engineering between 2012 and 2020.

== Career ==
Magistretti studied medicine at University of Geneva, and received his diploma in 1977 and his medical doctor degree in 1979 for his thesis on Etude de la liaison spécifique du ³H-spiropéridol dans la fraction membranaire de la rétine de mammifère supervised by Michel Schorderet. He then joined Floyd E. Bloom's A.V. Davis Center for Behavioral Neurobiology Laboratory at Salk Institute for Biological Studies in La Jolla and enrolled in a graduate program for neuroscience at the University of California, San Diego. In 1982, he received his PhD for a thesis on Vasoactive Intestinal Polypeptide: A Regulator of Cellular Homeostasis in Cerebral Cortex co-supervised by William Shoemaker. Until 1987 he was Maître Assistant (postdoctoral researcher) at University of Geneva's department of pharmacology and worked on the synergistic interactions between vasoactive intestinal peptide and norepinephrine in forming cyclic adenosine monophosphate (cAMP).

In 1988, he became professor at the University of Lausanne's department of physiology, whose chairman he was from 2001 to 2004. From 2004 to 2012 he was the founding director of the Center for Psychiatric Neuroscience at the University of Lausanne.

In 2005, he became professor and co-director of EPFL's Brain Mind Institute, whose sole director he became in 2008. From 2010 to 2016 he acted as director of the Swiss National Center for Competence SynaPsy. Since 2012, he has been distinguished professor and from 2012 to 2020 dean of the department of Biological, Environmental Sciences and Engineering at King Abdullah University of Science and Technology.

He was given emeritus status at EPFL in 2017, University of Geneva in 2017, and University of Lausanne in 2018.

== Distinctions ==
Magistretti is member and for former president of the Swiss Society for Neuroscience (1997–1999), the Federation of European Neuroscience Societies (FESN; 2002–2004), and the International Brain Research Organization (IBRO; 2014–2019). He was a member of the board of trustees of the Human Frontier Science Program (2003–2018), vice chairman of the European Dana Alliance for the Brain (EDAB; since 2002), honorary member of the Chinese Association for Physiological Sciences (since 2014), ad personam member of the Swiss Academy of Medical Sciences (since 2001), and member of Academia Europaea (since 2001).

He is the recipient of the 2016 IPSEN Foundation Prize (together with David Attwell and Marcus Raichle), the 2011 Camillo Golgi Medal Award from the Golgi Foundation, and the 2009 Goethe Award for Psychoanalytic and Psychodynamic Scholarship from Canadian Psychological Association. In 2024 Magistretti became a member of the Norwegian Academy of Science and Letters. In 2025, he was awarded an honorary doctorate in Neuroscience by the University of Turin.

He was International Chair Professor at Collège de France (2007–2008), and Emil Kraepelin Guest Professor at the Max Planck Institute of Psychiatry (2002).

== Selected works ==
- Pellerin, L.; Magistretti, P. J. (1994). "Glutamate uptake into astrocytes stimulates aerobic glycolysis: A mechanism coupling neuronal activity to glucose utilization". Proceedings of the National Academy of Sciences. 91 (22): 10625–10629. Bibcode:1994PNAS...9110625P. doi:10.1073/pnas.91.22.10625. PMC 45074. PMID 7938003.
- Magistretti, P. J.; Pellerin, L.; Rothman, D. L.; Shulman, R. G. (1999). "NEUROSCIENCE:Energy on Demand". Science. 283 (5401): 496–497. Bibcode:1999Sci...283..496.. doi:10.1126/science.283.5401.496. PMID 9988650. S2CID 83806643.
- Marquet, Pierre; Rappaz, Benjamin; Magistretti, Pierre J.; Cuche, Etienne; Emery, Yves; Colomb, Tristan; Depeursinge, Christian (2005). "Digital holographic microscopy: A noninvasive contrast imaging technique allowing quantitative visualization of living cells with subwavelength axial accuracy". Optics Letters. 30 (5): 468–470. Bibcode:2005OptL...30..468M. doi:10.1364/OL.30.000468. PMID 15789705.
- Bélanger, Mireille; Allaman, Igor; Magistretti, Pierre J. (2011). "Brain Energy Metabolism: Focus on Astrocyte-Neuron Metabolic Cooperation". Cell Metabolism. 14 (6): 724–738. doi:10.1016/j.cmet.2011.08.016. PMID 22152301.
- Lee, Youngjin; Morrison, Brett M.; Li, Yun; Lengacher, Sylvain; Farah, Mohamed H.; Hoffman, Paul N.; Liu, Yiting; Tsingalia, Akivaga; Jin, Lin; Zhang, Ping-Wu; Pellerin, Luc; Magistretti, Pierre J.; Rothstein, Jeffrey D. (2012). "Oligodendroglia metabolically support axons and contribute to neurodegeneration". Nature. 487 (7408): 443–448. Bibcode:2012Natur.487..443L. doi:10.1038/nature11314. PMC 3408792. PMID 22801498.
- Tsacopoulos, M.; Magistretti, PJ (1996). "Metabolic coupling between glia and neurons". The Journal of Neuroscience. 16 (3): 877–885. doi:10.1523/JNEUROSCI.16-03-00877.1996. PMC 6578818. PMID 8558256. S2CID 5974098.
- Suzuki, Akinobu; Stern, Sarah A.; Bozdagi, Ozlem; Huntley, George W.; Walker, Ruth H.; Magistretti, Pierre J.; Alberini, Cristina M. (2011). "Astrocyte-Neuron Lactate Transport is Required for Long-Term Memory Formation". Cell. 144 (5): 810–823. Bibcode:2011Cell..144..810S. doi:10.1016/j.cell.2011.02.018. PMC 3073831. PMID 21376239.
- Magistretti, Pierre J.; Pellerin, Luc (1999). "Cellular mechanisms of brain energy metabolism and their relevance to functional brain imaging". Philosophical Transactions of the Royal Society of London. Series B: Biological Sciences. 354 (1387): 1155–1163. doi:10.1098/rstb.1999.0471. PMC 1692634. PMID 10466143.
