= Viefers =

Viefers is a surname. Notable people with this name include:

- Susanne Viefers (born 1970), German-Norwegian physicist
- Ulrich Viefers (born 1972), German rower
