= Anne Deighton =

British historian

Anne Deighton FRHistS
- Occupation: Historian

Academic background
- Education: University of Oxford; University of Reading
- Doctoral advisor: Avi Shlaim

Academic work
- Discipline: Modern history
- Sub-discipline: History of the European Union
- Institutions: University of Reading; Open University; University of Oxford

Anne Deighton FRHistS is a British historian of the European Union. She is a Emeritus Professor of European International Politics at the University of Oxford and an Emeritus Fellow at Wolfson College, Oxford.

== Biography ==
Anne Deighton was educated at the University of Oxford, where she read modern history during a time when the subject's scope "ended decisively in 1939", and the University of Reading, where her doctoral advisor was Avi Shlaim. She worked at the University of Reading (1987–1991) and the Open University as a lecturer and at St Antony's College, Oxford as a NatWest Senior Research Fellow (1991–1997). She later became Reader in European International Politics at Oxford, before being promoted to Professor and eventually Emeritus Professor.

Deighton became fellow of Wolfson College, and she was eventually promoted to emeritus fellow. She was the Wiener – Anspach Foundation's Ganshof van der Meersch Chair (1999–2000), having received the support of political scientist Eric Remacle. She has also served as a Jean Monnet Chair in the history of European integration.

As an academic, Deighton specialises in the history of the European Union, especially the history of European integration. In addition to being an editor of several history books on the European Union, she is the author of The Impossible Peace: Britain, the Division of Germany and the Origins of the Cold War, 1945-1947 (1990), which discusses the United Kingdom's role in the star of the Cold War, particularly in post-war Germany. From 2009 to 2011, she hosted the Cyril Foster Lectures at the Department of Politics and International Relations, University of Oxford.

Deighton is a foreign member of the Norwegian Academy of Science and Letters's History section. She is a Fellow of the Royal Historical Society.

== Works ==
- Britain and the First Cold War (1990, as editor)
- The Impossible Peace: Britain, the Division of Germany and the Origins of the Cold War, 1945-1947 (1990)
- Western European Union, 1954-1997, Defence, Security, Integration (1997, as editor)
- WEU, 1948-1998: From the Treaty of Brussels to the Treaty of Amsterdam (1998, as co-editor)
- Widening, Deepening, Acceleration, the European Economic Community, 1957-1963 (1999, as co-editor)
- Building Postwar Europe: National Decision-Makers and European Institutions, 1948-1963 (2003, as editor)
- Securing Europe? Implementing the European Security Strategy (2006, as editor)
- The EC/EU: a World Security Actor? 1957-2007 (2007, as co-editor)
