= Nils Nygaard =

Norwegian legal scholar

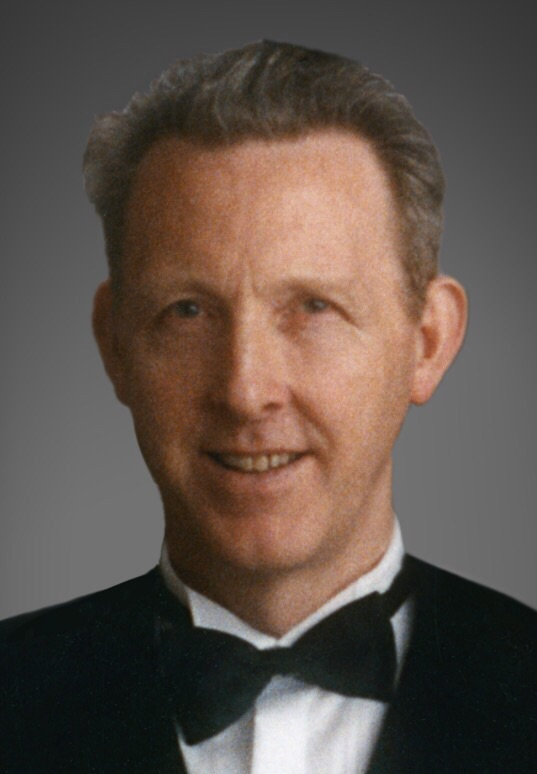
Nils Andreas Nygaard, legal scholar, (July 1988)

Nils Andreas Nygaard (born 3 April 1932, died 3 November 2015) was one of the founders of the Faculty of Law in Bergen and left behind one of the strongest tort law communities in the Nordic region. His teaching of the subject has left a lasting impact on generations of students.

Nils Nygaard was born and raised in Imsland Municipality in Ryfylke, Norway. He was born as the heir to a forest estate. In preparation for taking over the management of the property, he studied economics at the Oslo School of Economics, then at the Institute of Business Economics ("BI"). To complete his studies, he decided to study introductory law at the University of Oslo. However, law turned out to be Nygaard's great passion, so he chose to continue his law studies. He graduated with the Norwegian "Candidatus Juris" degree in 1967.

At that time, he became the first person in Oslo to receive a scholarship from the Norwegian General Research Council (NAVF). Nygaard moved to Bergen in 1969 where he was hired at the University of Bergen, affiliated with the HF faculty, since the law department had not yet been established. He became the first lawyer associated with the academic community in Bergen that from 1980 became the Faculty of Law.

In 1974, Nygaard earned his doctorate in jurisprudence for his dissertation "Aktløysevurderinga i norsk rettspraksis" ("the Culpa-norm according to Norwegian case law"). He was the first person to be awarded a doctorate in law at the University of Bergen. The following year he became an associate professor. This marked the beginning of his long academic career at the University of Bergen. Nygaard served as a professor of jurisprudence from 1977 to 2002 and as professor emeritus until 2013. During this period, he served as the Dean of the Faculty of Law for five years from 1986 to 1991. He was also elected as section leader and head of department, which reflects the trust and respect he earned among his colleagues. He played a key role in building the new faculty and was instrumental in consolidating the faculty together in the new Law Building at Dragefjellet. Alongside Gudrun Holgersen, with whom he co-authored several books, Nygaard contributed to the development of the field of Norwegian social security law.

Nygaard has a significant body of academic literature to his name, particularly in the fields of tort and social security law. His work "Skade og ansvar" (6th ed. 2007) is considered a standard work in Norwegian tort law. Nygaard was also the author of a substantial collection of articles covering topics ranging from insurance, suicide and mental illness to the state's liability for errors or omissions in implementing EU/EEA directives. throughout his career, Nygaard championed the use of the Norwegian Nynorsk language and was awarded the language Prize by the Juristmållaget (the Norwegian Association for the Promotion of Legal Language) in 2007.
