= Elisabeth Alve =

Norwegian environmental geologist and micropaleontologist

Elisabeth Alve (born 1957) is a Norwegian environmental geologist and micropaleontologist who studies benthic foraminifera, single-celled organisms found in seafloor sediments. Her research has included the study of how these organisms change their behavior in response to environmental changes such as marine pollution, the applications of these environmental responses in biomonitoring, and their taphonomy, the study of how ancient and modern foraminera became fossils. She is a professor emerita of environmental geosciences at the University of Oslo, in the Department of Geosciences and Faculty of Mathematics and Natural Sciences.

== Education and career ==
Alve earned a doctorate in geology from the University of Oslo in 1991.

She continued at the University of Oslo for postdoctoral research from 1991 to 1993, and then from 1994 to 1995 she worked for the Norwegian Geological Survey at the Norwegian Institute of Marine Research in Bergen. She returned to the University of Oslo as an associate professor in 1995, and was promoted to full professor in 1999.

== Recognition ==
Alve was elected to the Norwegian Academy of Science and Letters in 2004.
