= Ann-Cecilie Larsen =

Norwegian physicist

Ann-Cecilie Larsen (born 14 February 1980) is a Norwegian nuclear physicist and nuclear astrophysicist, whose research interests include reaction rates in the astrophysical creation of heavy elements. She is an associate professor of nuclear and energy physics at the University of Oslo.

== Education and career ==
Larsen is originally from Fredrikstad, on the southern coast of Norway near the Swedish border. She was inspired by high school physics teacher Erik Svendsen to continue her study of physics at the University of Oslo, where she earned a master's degree in 2002, a candidate of science in 2004, and a Ph.D. in 2008.

She stayed in Oslo as a postdoctoral researcher and, eventually, faculty member, and has also visited Michigan State University, the University of California, Berkeley, and the Lawrence Berkeley National Laboratory as a Fulbright Scholar.

== Recognition ==
Larsen was given the Young Excellent Researcher prize of the Research Council of Norway in 2016, and was elected to the Norwegian Academy of Science and Letters in 2017.
