= Norwegian Journal of Sociology =

- Discipline: Sociology
- Language: Norwegian, Danish, Swedish, occasionally English
- Edited by: Uzair Ahmed, Hedda Haakestad, Aksel Tjora og Gunhild Tøndel

Publication details
- Former names: Sosiologi i dag, Sosiologisk tidsskrift
- History: 1971-present
- Publisher: Universitetsforlaget (Norway)
- Frequency: Quarterly

Standard abbreviations
- ISO 4: Nor. J. Sociol.

Indexing
- ISSN: 2535-2512
- OCLC no.: 986519987

Links
- Journal homepage

The Norwegian Journal of Sociology (Norwegian: Norsk sosiologisk tidsskrift) is a Norwegian, peer-reviewed academic journal within the field of sociology. It is published by Universitetsforlaget on behalf of all the institutes of sociology at Norway's universities, with support from the Research Council of Norway. The journal is the result of the 2016 merger of the journals, Sosiologi i dag ("Sociology Today"), established in 1971, and Sosiologisk tidsskrift ("Journal of Sociology"), established in 1993, which were both among the then three leading social science journals in Norway; the journal also obtained its present title at the time of the merger. The journal's joint editors-in-chief are Uzair Ahmed, Hedda Haakestad, Aksel Tjora and Gunhild Tøndel. Previous editors are Mette I. Snertingdal, Cecilie Basberg Neumann, Hans Erik Næss, Kari Stefansen, May-Len Skilbrei and Arve Hjelseth.

Formerly a print subscription journal, the Norwegian Journal of Sociology became an open access online-only journal in 2017 and is available through Scandianvian University Press' publication platform.

The journal is primarily published in the Scandinavian languages, that is Norwegian, Danish and Swedish, which are mutually intelligible, and also occasionally publishes articles in English.
