= Marianne Gullestad =

Norwegian social anthropologist

- Born: 28 March 1946; Kristiansand, Norway
- Died: 10 March 2008 (aged 61); Oslo, Norway
- Education: University of Bergen (M.A.)(Ph.D.)
- Spouse: Jan Terje Faarlund
- Scientific career
- Fields: Anthropology
- Workplaces: University of Bergen; University of Tromsø; Norsk senter for barneforskning University of Chicago

Marianne Gullestad (28 March 1946 – 10 March 2008) was a Norwegian social anthropologist. Gullestad grew up in Bergen, took her magister degree in social anthropology from the University of Bergen in 1975 and her dr. philos. in 1984. Her thesis from 1984, Kitchen table society, treated the life of young working-class mothers. She was appointed guest lecturer at the University of Chicago during three periods in the 1980s and 1990s. From 1998 she was appointed assistant professor at the University of Tromsø. Gullestad frequently appeared in television and radio, and wrote hundreds of newspaper articles.

She was awarded Eilert Sundt's Research Prize in 1989, and the Norwegian Academy Prize in memory of Thorleif Dahl in 2007.

She was married to the linguist Jan Terje Faarlund.
