= Geir Asheim =

Norwegian economist

Geir Bjarne Asheim (born 3 October 1953) is a Norwegian economist and professor of economics at the Department of Economics, University of Oslo.

Asheim obtained his cand.mag. degree from the University of Bergen in 1975 and his Ph.D. from University of California at Santa Barbara in 1979. He mainly works in economic theory, publishing in journals such as Journal of Economic Theory and Theoretical Economics. Most of his research output is theoretical work relating to climate economics, intergenerational equity, game theory or national accounting.

He became a professor at the University of Oslo in 1994, and also adjunct professor at Agder University College in 1995.

Asheim has authored two books Justifying, Characterizing and Indicating Sustainability and The Consistent Preferences Approach to Deductive Reasoning in Games, both of which were published by Springer Publishing. He is an editor for Social Choice and Welfare. He is a member of the Norwegian Academy of Science and Letters from 2014 and the European Association of Environmental and Resource Economists from 2020.
