= Hanna Meretoja =

Finnish professor

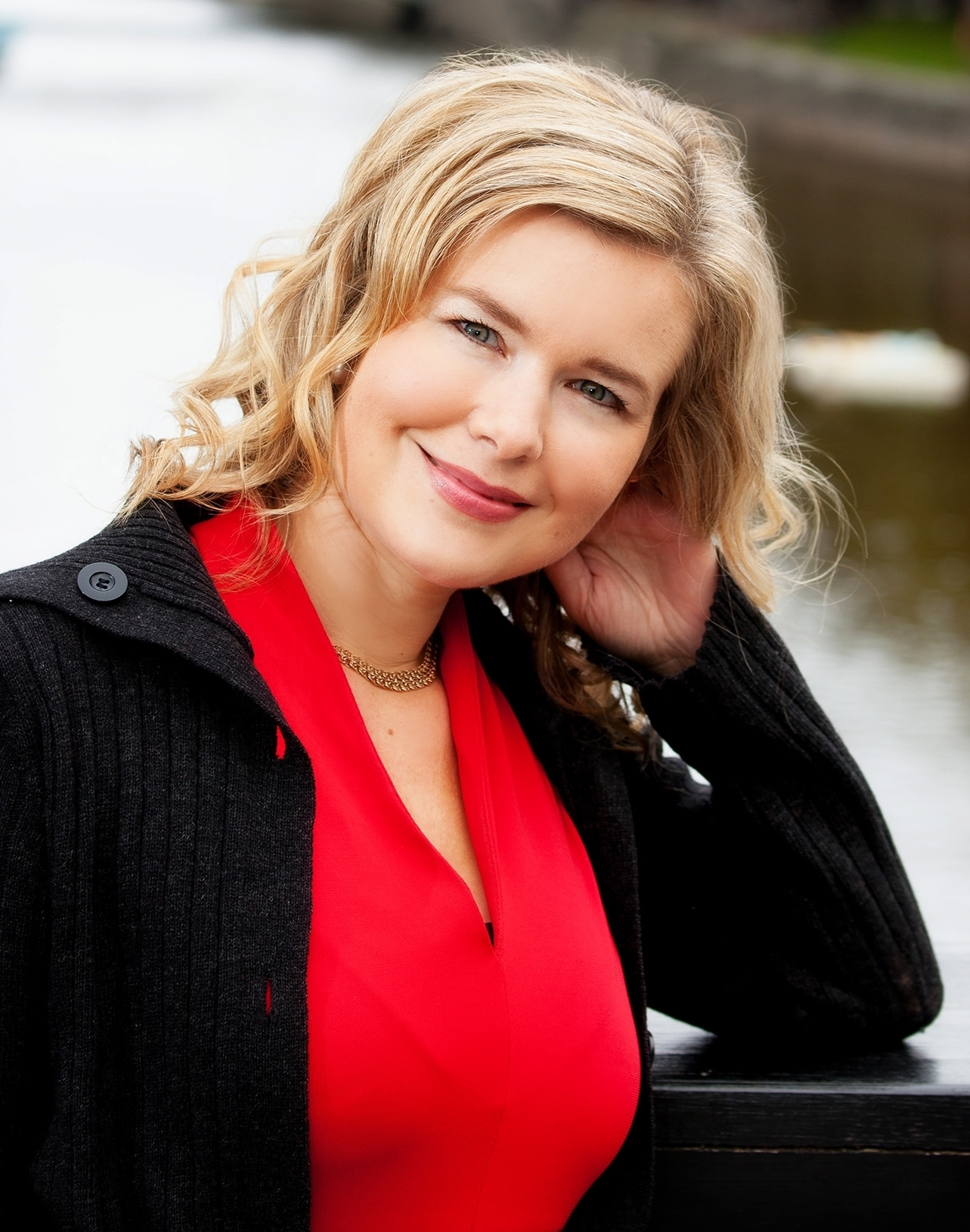
2017 Photo of Hanna Meretoja

Hanna Meretoja is a Finnish literary scholar and narrative theorist. She is professor of Comparative Literature at the University of Turku. She is also a novelist.

== Education and career ==
In 2001, Meretoja received her M.A. from the University of Turku, where she studied comparative literature as her major and philosophy, art history, cultural history and communications as her minors. In 2010, she completed her Ph.D. in comparative literature at the University of Turku. The title of her thesis is The French Narrative Turn: From the Problematization of Narrative Subjectivity in Alain Robbe-Grillet’s Dans le labyrinthe to its Hermeneutic Rehabilitation in Michel Tournier’s Le Roi des Aulnes. Meretoja was a visiting scholar at the University of Tübingen in 2002–2003, Sorbonne Nouvelle in 2004 and Uppsala University in 2008, as well as a visiting professor at the American University of Paris in 2013–2014. In 2014-2015, she was the first director of the research centre Narrare: Centre for Interdisciplinary Narrative Studies at the University of Tampere. In 2019-2020, she was Visiting Fellow at the University of Oxford (Exeter College and Oxford Centre for Life-Writing, Wolfson College). She is Director of SELMA: Centre for the Study of Storytelling, Experientiality and Memory.

== Work ==
Meretoja has contributed mainly to the fields of narrative theory, narrative hermeneutics and narrative ethics. Her areas of expertise also include the interrelations between literature, philosophy and history; literary and critical theory; cultural memory studies; trauma studies; philosophical hermeneutics; the intersections of ethics and aesthetics; 20th and 21st century narrative fiction in French, German and English; the socio-critical dimension of literature; and the study of subjectivity, identity and experientiality. Her novel Elotulet (2022, The Night of Ancient Lights) has been translated in German with the title Die Nacht der alten Feuer (2024, Mare Verlag, translated by Stefan Moster).

== Books in English ==
- The Narrative Turn in Fiction and Theory: The Crisis and Return of Storytelling from Robbe-Grillet to Tournier. (Palgrave Macmillan, 2014)
- Values of Literature. (Brill, 2015, co-edited with Saija Isomaa, Pirjo Lyytikäinen & Kristina Malmio)
- The Ethics of Storytelling: Narrative Hermeneutics, History, and the Possible. (Oxford University Press, 2018)
- Storytelling and Ethics: Literature, Visual Arts and the Power of Narrative. (Routledge, 2018, co-edited with Colin Davis)
- Sen, Amartya; Räikkä, Juha; Meretoja, Hanna (2000). Luentoja etiikasta ja taloustieteestä (in Finnish). ISBN 978-951-579-107-8.

== Honors and awards ==
In 2018, Meretoja received the Early Career Award of the Narrative Research Special Interest Group of the American Educational Research Association. She was inducted into the Norwegian Academy of Science and Letters in 2023. She is also member of Academia Europaea.
