= Reidar Maliks =

- Born: 1972 (age 53–54)

Academic background
- Education: Columbia University (PhD)
- Thesis: Making the Center Hold: Kant on Sovereignty and Resistance (2008)

Academic work
- Era: Contemporary philosophy
- Region: Western philosophy
- School or tradition: German Idealism
- Institutions: University of Oslo

Reidar Kiljan Maliks (born 1972) is a professor of philosophy at the University of Oslo and a member of the Norwegian Academy of Science and Letters.

== Life and work ==
Malik received his PhD from Columbia University in 2008 and has been awarded the Derek Bok Certificate of Distinction for Teaching at Harvard University. He was elected to the Norwegian Academy of Science and Letters in 2025.

Maliks 2014 book Kant's Politics in Context has been translated to Japanese in 2024.

== Publications ==
- Maliks, Reidar (2022). "Kant and the French Revolution". Elements in the Philosophy of Immanuel Kant. doi:10.1017/9781108529723.
- Maliks, Reidar (2014). Kant's Politics in Context. Oxford University Press. doi:10.1093/acprof:oso/9780199645152.001.0001. ISBN 978-0-19-964515-2.
