= Kjetill Sigurd Jakobsen =

Norwegian biologist

Kjetill Sigurd Jakobsen is a Norwegian biologist. He is a professor at the Centre for Ecological and Evolutionary Synthesis (CEES) at the University of Oslo and a member of the Norwegian Academy of Science and Letters.

Jakobsen is known for sequencing the Atlantic cod, thereby adding it to the list of sequenced animal genomes, and population genomic studies of this species.

Jakobsen is also known for his contributions to protist evolution research, to the complex evolutionary processes of polyploids, and toxin genes in cyanobacteria and dinoflagellates. Since 2018, Jakobsen has contributed to research on De novo gene birth and Deep sea fish.
