= Anne-Brit Kolstø =

Norwegian microbiologist

Anne-Brit Kolstø (born 21 May 1945) is a Norwegian microbiologist.

She took her dr.philos. degree in biochemistry at the University of Tromsø, and is now a professor of microbiology at the Department of Pharmaceutical Biosciences, University of Oslo. From 2002 to 2005 she served as prorector of the University of Oslo.

She is a fellow of the Norwegian Academy of Science and Letters and the Royal Norwegian Society of Sciences and Letters. She is also a deputy board member of the Norwegian University of Life Sciences.

She was married to fellow professor Hans Prydz (1933–2011). They resided at Smestad.
