= Toril Swan =

Norwegian linguist (1945–2022)

Toril Swan (19 October 1945 – 13 September 2022) was a Norwegian linguist.

She was born in Sandnessjøen. After taking a bachelor's degree in philosophy at Bates College in 1970, she graduated with the cand.philol. degree from the University of Oslo in 1978. Swan was hired as an associate professor at the University of Tromsø in 1980, and received the dr.philos. degree from the same institution in 1987. Promoted to professor in 1990, she also served as dean of the Faculty of Humanities from 1997 to 2002.

Swan was a dean at the University of Stavanger from 2002 to 2004 before moving to Bergen, though continuing on the faculty of the University of Tromsø until her retirement in 2016. Swan was a member of the Norwegian Academy of Science and Letters since 1997.

In Bergen she became known as a figurehead in the Humanist Association. She was married to Leiv Egil Breivik.

Swan died on 13 September 2022.
