= Else-Ragnhild Neumann =

Norwegian geologist

Else-Ragnhild Neumann (born 1938) is a Norwegian geologist, "Norway’s first female professor of geology". She is a professor emerita at the University of Oslo, affiliated with its Faculty of Mathematics and Natural Sciences, Department of Geosciences, and Centre for Planetary Habitability. Her research has concerned vulcanism, mantle plumes, and the chemistry of the rocks formed in these processes, especially in connection with the Oslo Graben, a volcanic formation near Oslo in Norway.

== Education and career ==
Neumann was born on 7 December 1938. She grew up in Oslo hoping to become a physician, but she did not get into medical school in Oslo, and her parents hid from her the fact that she was accepted to another program in Bergen, as they were only able to afford to send one of their children to another city for school and they chose to send her brother to an engineering program in Trondheim. Instead, she obtained a degree in physical geography from the University of Oslo and became a high school teacher for two years in Ris, Norway.

After marrying and leaving her job, she began an international tour with her husband, beginning in the United States, where she obtained a master's degree in structural geology at the University of California, Los Angeles. They continued their tour in Europe, and she became a researcher in Zurich, leaving work while pregnant with her second child. Returning to Norway, she took a research assistant position at the University of Oslo in 1972. She completed her Ph.D. there in 1979, and became an associate professor. She was promoted to full professor in 1981.

== Recognition ==
Neumann is a member of the Norwegian Academy of Science and Letters since 1983, and was elected to the Academia Europaea in 1993.

The annual Else-Ragnhild Neumann Award for women in geosciences was established in her honor in 2018, at a symposium to honor Neumann's 80th birthday.
