= Hans Christian Johansen =

Danish historian

Hans Christian Johansen (born 27 June 1935) is a Danish historian.

He was a professor at the Odense University from 1970 to 2003. He is a fellow of the Norwegian Academy of Science and Letters from 1980.

His books include Dansk økonomisk politik i årene efter 1784 (1968).
