= Brit Salbu =

Norwegian radiochemist

Brit Salbu (born 1947) is a Norwegian radiochemist and radioecologist whose research has concerned the environmental effects of radioactive materials. She is a professor emerita at the Norwegian University of Life Sciences (NMBU), and the former director of the NMBU Centre for Environmental Radioactivity (CERAD) and chair of the NATO Environmental Security Panel.

== Education and career ==
Salbu has a Ph.D. from the Department of Nuclear Chemistry of the University of Oslo. She was a doctoral student of Alexis Pappas, whose advisor Ellen Gleditsch was a student of Marie Curie. Salbu became one of the earliest researchers to investigate the consequences of the Chernobyl disaster in 1986.

In 1987 she became head of the Isotope Laboratory at the Agricultural University of Norway, which later became the Norwegian University of Life Sciences.

== Recognition ==
Salbu is a member of the Norwegian Academy of Science and Letters. The International Union of Radioecology gave Salbu the V. I. Vernadsky Award in 2014, "in recognition of her outstanding contribution to the development and dissemination of radioecology". Salbu received an honorary doctorate from the National University of Life and Environmental Sciences of Ukraine in 2016. She was named as a knight first class in the Order of St. Olav in 2020.
