= Staale Sinding-Larsen =

Norwegian art historian

Staale Sinding-Larsen (born 12 April 1929) is a Norwegian art historian.

He was born in Oslo. He took the dr.philos. degree in 1975 with the doctoral thesis Christ in the Council Hall. Studies in the Religious Iconography of the Venetian Republic. After one year as guest scholar at New York University, he became professor of architectural history at the Norwegian Institute of Technology in 1969, also serving as director of the Norwegian Institute in Rome from 1983 to 1986. He is a member of the Norwegian Academy of Science and Letters.
