= Eivind Osnes =

Norwegian physicist

Eivind Osnes (born 11 May 1938) is a Norwegian physicist.

He took his dr.philos. degree at the University of Oslo in 1966. His specialty became theoretical nuclear physics. He became docent at the University of Oslo in 1977 and professor in 1985. He is a member of the Norwegian Academy of Science and Letters. In 2009 he received the King's Medal of Merit in gold. Osnes is one out of two Norwegian delegates to the CERN Council.

Osnes chaired the Norwegian Board of Technology from 1999 to 2007.
