= Otto Smiseth =

Norwegian professor of medicine

Otto Armin Smiseth (born 26 July 1949) is a Norwegian professor of medicine.

Hailing from Asker, he took his cand.med. degree at the University of Oslo in 1975 and his dr.med. degree at the University of Tromsø in 1993. His speciality is cardiac physiology. In 1995 he became a professor at the University of Oslo and Rikshospitalet. He is a member of the Norwegian Academy of Science and Letters.
