= May-Len Skilbrei =

Norwegian sociologist, criminologist and gender studies scholar

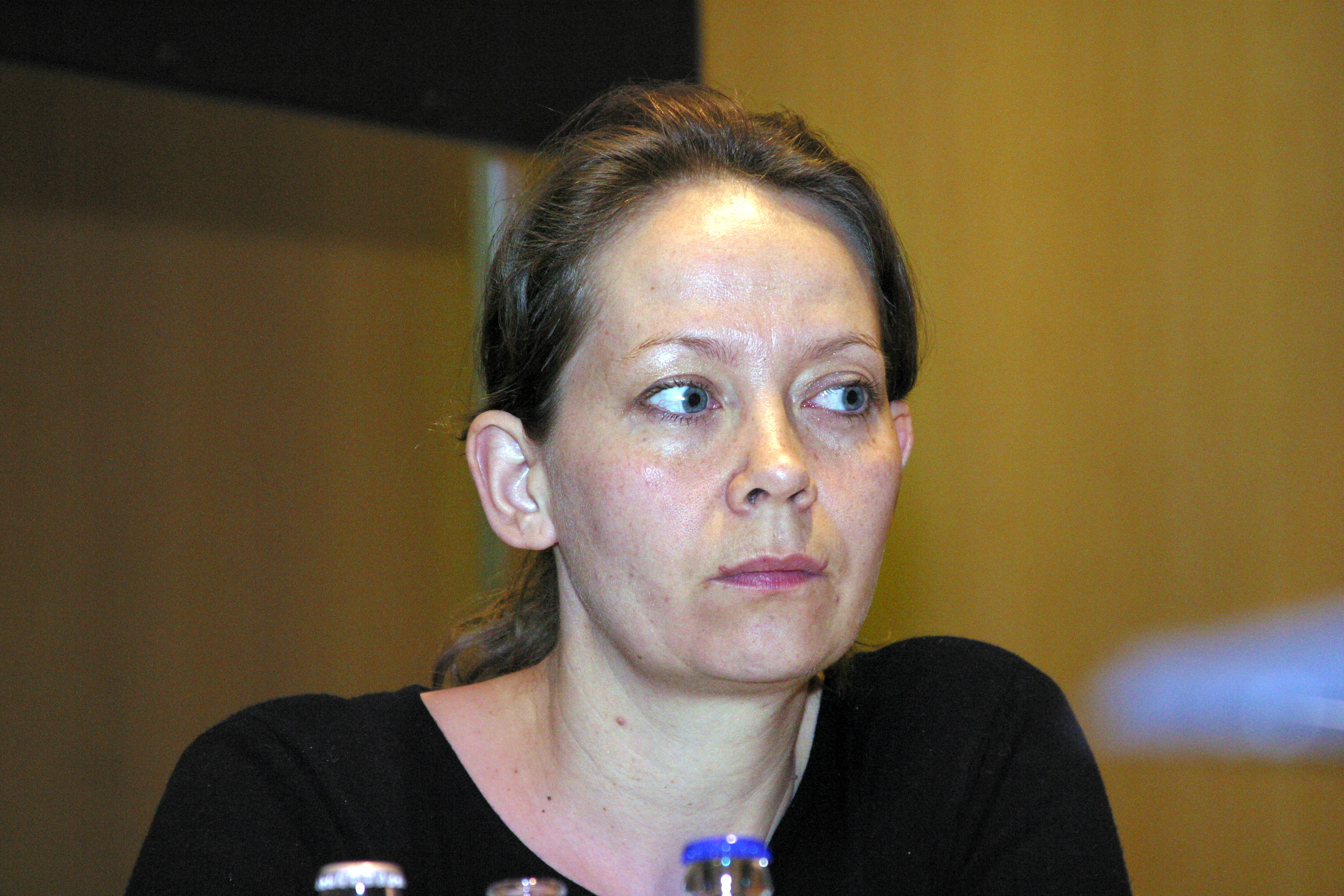
- Born: 1971 (age 54–55)

Academic background
- Education: University of Oslo

Academic work
- Discipline: Sociologist, criminologist
- Institutions: University of Oslo
- Main interests: Gender studies, migration, immigration policy, violence

May-Len Skilbrei (born 1971) is a Norwegian sociologist, criminologist and gender studies scholar. She is Professor of Criminology at the Department of Criminology and Sociology of Law at the University of Oslo Faculty of Law. She has previously been managing director of the Fafo Institute for Applied International Studies. She is editor-in-chief of the journal Sosiologi i dag (with Kari Stefansen). She has also been President of the Association for Gender Research in Norway, board member of the European Society of Criminology and board member of the University of Oslo Faculty of Law. She also headed the Research network on prostitution in the Nordic countries. She has been described by Aftenposten as one of Norway's leading experts on prostitution and human trafficking.

== Career ==
May-Len Skilbrei earned her PhD in sociology at the University of Oslo in 2003. She has been a research fellow and researcher at Norwegian Social Research (NOVA) 1998–2003, a postdoctoral researcher at the Department of Criminology and Sociology of Law at the University of Oslo, before joining the private Fafo Foundation where she was a researcher, research director and managing director for seven years until her appointment as a professor of criminology at the University of Oslo.

Skilbrei's research has focused on prostitution and human trafficking. She has also done research on unskilled women in the workforce. Her research fields are mainly migration, gender, immigration policy and violence.

In 2024 Hjellbrekke became a member of the Norwegian Academy of Science and Letters.
