= Inger Sandlie =

Norwegian molecular biologist

Inger Sandlie (born 8 June 1953) is a Norwegian molecular biologist.

She took her dr.philos. degree in biochemistry at the University of Bergen, and was a post-doctoral fellow at the Johns Hopkins University. She was hired at the University of Oslo in 1988, and is now a professor at the Section for Biochemistry and Molecular Biology. She is a fellow of the Norwegian Academy of Science and Letters.

She resides at Røa.
