= Harald Herresthal =

Norwegian musicologist (born 1944)

Harald Herresthal (born 15 January 1944) is a German-born Norwegian organist, composer and musicologist.

== Early life and education ==
He was born in Neuwied as a son of Heinz Herresthal and Bjørg Nordsjø. His father was a violinist and his mother an organist. The family moved to Norway, where he grew up both in Narvik and Vestfossen.

Harald Herresthal enrolled at the Norwegian Conservatory of Music, where he also tutored others from 1964. His main instrument was the church organ, graduating as an organist and cantor in 1966. During the next two years, he studied further, and graduated with the cand.philol. degree in musicology from the University of Oslo in 1968.

== Career ==
He was a church organist from 1965. He worked as such in Grefsen Church from 1967 and Majorstuen Church from 1974. He also held his debut concert in Paulus Church in 1968. From 1973 to 1976 he chaired the organists' union, Norges organistforbund.

In 1968, Herresthal was employed at the Conservatory of Music, becoming an associate professor in 1973 upon the establishment of the Norwegian Academy of Music. He was promoted to professor in 1978 and also served as rector from 1980 to 1983. He was inducted into the Norwegian Academy of Science and Letters, received the Lindeman Award in 2001 and an honorary degree at the Berlin University of the Arts in 2003.

Herresthal is a composer and psalm writer, having edited Norsk Salmebok (1985) and written several hymns included therein. His largest volume of work was the four-volume book about Ole Bull, Ole Bull: En kunstner og hans tid (2006–2010). He has written biographical accounts on Carl Arnold, Arild Sandvold, Conrad Baden, Knut Nystedt og Egil Hovland, as well as musical history from the 1800s and 1940–1945. As a German-Norwegian "war child" himself, he wrote the personal memoir Min mor valgte meg: Et krigsbarns familiehistorie (2017).

He contributed to the five-volume work Norges musikkhistorie, The New Grove Dictionary of Music and Musicians and Die Musik in Geschichte und Gegenwart. From 1973 to 1975 he edited the church music journal Norsk kirkemusikk. From 1969 to 1988 he was a music critic in Aftenposten, having also written for Morgenbladet and Verdens Gang.

Academic offices
Preceded by Robert Levin	Rector of the Norwegian Academy of Music; 1980–1983	Succeeded by Harald Jørgensen
