= Arne Foldvik =

Norwegian oceanographer

Arne Foldvik (born 6 April 1930) is a Norwegian oceanographer.

He was born in Tromsø as a son of as a son of meteorologist Nils M. Foldvik and Helene Andresen. In 1956 he married teacher Ninja Schibbye Danifer, a daughter of painter Sigurd Danifer.

He finished his secondary education in 1948 and graduated from the University of Oslo with the cand.real. degree in meteorology in 1955. After a period as research fellow from 1955 to 1960, at the Norwegian Academy of Science and Letters's Institute for Weather and Climate Research led by Einar Høiland, he was hired as a lecturer at the University of Bergen in 1960. Finishing his dr.philos. degree in 1968, he was promoted to docent in 1976 and professor of physical oceanography in 1985. His main fields of study were the Arctic and Antarctic Oceans. He has been a visiting scholar at the University of California, Los Angeles (1963–64), University of Gothenburg (1970–71), University of Washington (1981–82) and the Office of Naval Research (1988–89).

He sat on the council for the Chr. Michelsen Institute from 1989 to 1993. and helped build the University Centre in Svalbard. He is a fellow of the Norwegian Academy of Science and Letters since 1992.
