= Lene Juel Rasmussen =

Danish geneticist and gerontologist

Lene Juel Rasmussen is a Danish geneticist and gerontologist. She is a professor at the University of Copenhagen, where she is also managing director of the university's Center for Healthy Aging.

== Biography ==
She was educated at the Technical University of Denmark, where she got her MSc in Chemical Engineering in 1988 and, at the Department of Microbiology with the supervision of Tove Atlung, her PhD in Molecular Genetics in 1991. After working as a postdoctoral researcher at the University of Massachusetts Medical School (1991-1994) and the Harvard School of Public Health (1994-1996), she started working at Roskilde University as assistant professor in 1996, before being promoted to associate professor in 2000 and eventually Professor in 2006. In 2009, she moved to the University of Copenhagen, where in addition to becoming Professor, she also became managing director of the university's Center for Healthy Aging.

As an academic, Rasmussen specializes in the genetic origins of diseases, particularly measles, mumps, rubella, hereditary nonpolyposis colorectal cancer, and similar diseases. At the University of Copenhagen Department of Cellular and Molecular Medicine, she also runs the Rasmussen Group, a research group specializing in the relationship between the causes of aging and their effects.

She is a foreign member of the Norwegian Academy of Science and Letters's Medicine section.
