= Christel Fricke =

German philosopher

- Born: 1955 (age 70–71); Berlin, Germany
- Awards: Member of the Norwegian Academy of Science and Letters; Member of the Royal Norwegian Society of Sciences and Letters

Education
- Education: Staatsexamen in Philosophy and French Language & Literature (Heidelberg University, 1981); PhD in Philosophy (Heidelberg University, 1988); Habilitation (Heidelberg University, 1998)

Philosophical work
- Era: 21st-century philosophy
- Region: Western philosophy
- Institutions: University of Oslo
- Main interests: moral philosophy, aesthetics, history of philosophy
- Website: https://christelfricke.no/

Christel Fricke (born 1955) is a German philosopher and professor of philosophy at the University of Oslo. Her research focuses on moral philosophy, aesthetics, and the moral-sentimentalist tradition, especially in relation to Adam Smith, David Hume, and Immanuel Kant.

== Books ==
- Kants Theorie des reinen Geschmacksurteils (De Gruyter, 1990)
- Das Recht der Vernunft: Kant und Hegel über Denken, Erkennen und Handeln (Frommann Holzboog, 1995)
- Zeichenprozeß und ästhetische Erfahrung (Wilhelm Fink Verlag, 2001)
- (ed.) Adam Smith als Moralphilosoph (De Gruyter, 2005)
- (ed.) The Ethics of Forgiveness: A Collection of Essays (Routledge, 2011)
- (ed.) Intersubjectivity and Objectivity in Adam Smith and Edmund Husserl: A Collection of Essays (Ontos Verlag / De Gruyter, 2012)
- (ed., with Christian Beyer and Frode Kjosavik) Husserl’s Phenomenology of Intersubjectivity: Historical Interpretations and Contemporary Applications (Routledge, 2018)
