= Jan Raa =

Norwegian biologist

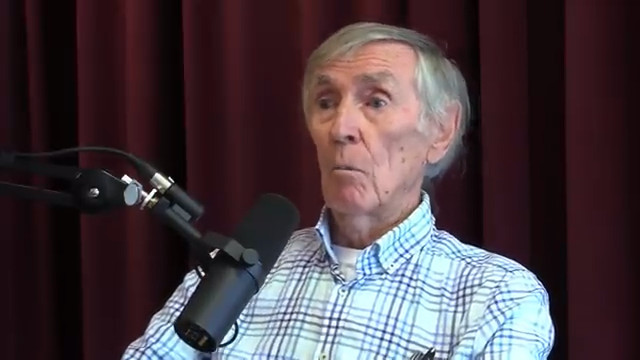
Jan Raa in 2023 at Wolfgang Wee Uncut Podcast

Jan Raa (born 11 October 1939) is a Norwegian biologist.

Raa was a professor at the University of Tromsø from 1972 to 1988, and has an honorary degree at the same university. After his tenure at the University of Tromsø he was a director at the Directorate of Fisheries Institute of Nutrition, research director at Fiskeriforskning and developer of the company Biotec Pharmacon.

He is a fellow of the Norwegian Academy of Science and Letters and the Norwegian Academy of Technological Sciences. In 2010 he was decorated as a Commander of the Order of St. Olav.
