= Earth4All =

International sustainability initiative

Earth4All is an initiative launched in 2022 that promotes economic systems change to achieve sustainable development and social equity within planetary boundaries. The project builds upon the legacy of The Limits to Growth report from 1972 and is convened by the Club of Rome, the Potsdam Institute for Climate Impact Research, the Stockholm Resilience Centre and the BI Norwegian Business School. Earth4All is also the name of the computer model used in the initiative's research, while the initiative's primary publication is titled Earth for All: A Survival Guide for Humanity.

== Background ==
The initiative emerged from discussions among economic thinkers, scientists, advocates and policy experts about the need for new models to address 21st-century challenges. It was conceived as a follow-up to the Limits to Growth study, which used computer modelling to examine the implications of exponential economic and population growth with finite resources.

== Main components ==
=== Earth for All: A Survival Guide for Humanity ===
The initiative's publication, Earth for All: A Survival Guide for Humanity (2022), presents two scenarios for the global economy to 2100. The scenarios are based on expert elicitation via a "transformational economics commission", literature reviews and computer modelling, which helps ensure the scenarios are internally consistent. The book was co-authored by Sandrine Dixson-Declève, Owen Gaffney, Jayati Ghosh, Jørgen Randers (co-author of The Limits to Growth), Johan Rockström and Per Espen Stoknes, with a foreword by climate activist Elizabeth Wathuti. It outlines five "extraordinary turnarounds" needed to achieve sustainable prosperity and wellbeing on a finite planet:

- Eliminate poverty
- Reduce inequality
- Empower women
- Transform food systems
- Transform energy systems

The analysis stresses that these turnarounds must be implemented simultaneously in order to achieve the desired outcomes.

Alongside the five turnarounds, the book proposes a transformation of the current economic system to one that prioritises human and planetary wellbeing above economic growth.

The book has been published in 11 languages and the Argentinian version was recognised in 2024 as a book of legislative interest by the City of Buenos Aires. A further book applying the Earth4All modelling to Germany, Earth for All: Germany was published in October 2024 and reached number nine on the Der Spiegel nonfiction bestseller list

=== System dynamics modelling ===
Earth4All employs system dynamics-based modelling to support expert analysis of potential future scenarios. For this purpose, the initiative developed a highly aggregated global simulation, Earth4All-global, which draws on insights from earlier system dynamics world models, including the World3 model used for The Limits to Growth. A regional, less-aggregated version was developed alongside the global model. The models are intended to explore long-term interactions between social, economic and environmental variables and to test the internal consistency of the scenarios. The project developed two main scenarios:

- "Too Little Too Late" - modelling current policy trajectories
- "Giant Leap" - modelling transformative policy changes

These scenarios are detailed in the book Earth for All: A Survival Guide for Humanity and are used by the Earth4All initiative as a basis for policy proposals to achieve the "Giant Leap" scenario. In this scenario, rapid global cooperation to enact the five "extraordinary turnarounds" results in stabilised temperatures, reduced material use, and the end of extreme poverty. According to the model, in this scenario social tension falls, inequality is reduced, and wellbeing rises. The authors warn of social breakdown if the alternative scenario is pursued.

The analytic approach, alongside the Millennium Institute's iSDG model, has since been used to model these scenarios for Kenya, Germany and Austria, and to analyse pathways towards the SDGs in Sub-Saharan Africa and globally.

The global and regional models are available open source and are subject to ongoing academic analysis and discussion.

== Reception and impact ==
The book and initiative have generated discussion across academic, policy, and public spheres since its launch. It was featured at the 2023 European Parliament "Beyond Growth" conference, with Executive Chair Sandrine Dixson-Declève giving a keynote address. Its 2024 research conducted with Ipsos UK into public attitudes to progressive tax policies was quoted by economist Gabriel Zucman in support of a G20 initiative for a global wealth tax

Its analysis has influenced organisations and initiatives including H&M Foundation and the European Union Youth Orchestra, who based its 2023 tour on the initiative. In 2023, Italian newspaper La Repubblica named its annual Green&Blue festival "Earth for All, Una Terra per Tutti" inspired by the book.

=== Population projections ===
In 2023 the Earth4All initiative published a paper on its model's projections on global population growth. The model suggests that the world's population will peak earlier than predicted by previous studies, reaching a high of 8.8 billion in the middle of the 21st century then declining rapidly. These projections were critiqued by some as overly optimistic

The study also analysed the connection between population and exceeding planetary boundaries. It found that population size is not the prime driver of exceeding planetary boundaries such as climate change, but rather the high material footprint of the world's richest 10%.
