= Arvid O. Vollsnes =

Norwegian historian of music

Arvid Olav Vollsnes (born 16 April 1945) is a Norwegian historian of music.

He took the mag.art. degree in 1972 with a thesis on the passacaglia of the composer Ludvig Irgens-Jensen. He was employed by the University of Oslo's Department of Musicology where he eventually became professor. He was inducted into the Norwegian Academy of Science and Letters in 2004.

Vollsnes published a biography about Irgens-Jensen, Komponisten Ludvig Irgens-Jensen in 2000 and also published on Fartein Valen.

In the 1990s he was the chief editor for the five-volume work on the history of music in Norway, Norges musikkhistorie published by Aschehoug. He followed up as editor of Norges opera- og balletthistorie in two volumes in 2010.

He married Brit Victoria Mogens in Haslum Church in December 1968. He resided at Øvrevoll.
