= Bjørn Gjevik =

Norwegian physicist

Bjørn Gjevik (born 30 March 1939) is a Norwegian physicist.

He hails from Hitra Municipality. He took the dr.philos. degree in 1972 and became a professor of hydrodynamics at the University of Oslo in 1977. He is a fellow of the Norwegian Academy of Science and Letters.

He resides at Grav.
