= Anne Spurkland =

Norwegian professor of immunology

Anne Spurkland (born 22 August 1960) is a Norwegian anatomist and immunologist.

She finished the cand.med. degree at the University of Oslo in the autumn of 1986. In 1993 she delivered the doctoral thesis HLA Associated Genetic Susceptibility to Multiple Sclerosis and Coeliac disease, gaining the dr.med. degree.

She became a professor at the University of Oslo. In 2017 she issued her first popular science book, Immun. Kroppens evige kamp for å overleve about the immune system. During the COVID-19 pandemic in Norway, Spurkland was often used by various media as an expert immunologist. She is a fellow of the Norwegian Academy of Science and Letters.

Spurkland is married. In adopting children from Ethiopia, she learned Amharic. Spurkland grew up at Hvalstad in Asker, also settling there. She has been an activist against high-rise development around Hvalstad Station. In having engaged herself with coeliac disease, she has also issued a cookbook of gluten-free cakes, Frie kaker, on the publishin house Spartacus in 2011.
