= Guðrún Nordal =

Icelandic academic

Guðrún Nordal (born 27 September 1960) is a professor at the University of Iceland and the Director of the Árni Magnússon Institute for Icelandic Studies in Reykjavík. She has written several books and is considered a leading scholar of medieval Icelandic literature.

== Career ==
Guðrún Nordal was born in Reykjavík, the daughter of Jóhannes Nordal, governor of the Central Bank of Iceland, and Dóra Guðjónsdóttir. She studied at the University of Iceland (BA, 1982), the Ludwig-Maximilians-Universität München (1982–1983), and the University of Oxford (DPhil, 1988). Her dissertation, on ethics in 13th-century sagas, was published by Odense University Press in 1998. She has been a leading scholar of Icelandic skaldic poetry. Her book, Tools of Literacy: The Role of Skaldic verse in Icelandic Textual Culture, demonstrates how Icelandic courtly poetry was a bridge between the Latin culture of the Middle Ages and the Icelandic literary tradition. She became a researcher at Stofnun Árna Magnússonar in 1997, Assistant Professor in Icelandic literature at the University of Iceland in 2001 and full professor in 2004. In 2009, she was appointed Director of the Árni Magnússon Institute. In 2015, she ran for the position of President and Rector of the University of Iceland, losing the election to Jón Atli Benediktsson.

Guðrún has been active in local and international research projects and administration. She has served on the Governing Council of the European Science Foundation, and was chair of NordForsk (the Nordic Science Insititution) from 2008 to 2014. She is on the editorial board of the project Skaldic Poetry of the Scandinavian Middle Ages.

She has been awarded various honors for her academic work. These include the Order of the White Rose of Finland, Royal Norwegian Order of Merit, and the Danish Order of the Dannebrog. In 2010, she was awarded the Knight's Cross of the Order of the Falcon for her work on behalf of Icelandic studies. She is a Fellow of the Royal Gustavus Adolphus Academy and the Norwegian Academy of Science and Letters (from 2020), and a member of the Academia Europaea.

== Family ==
Guðrún Nordal is married to architect Ögmundur Skarphéðinsson, and they have one daughter. Her grandfather was the renowned scholar and ambassador Sigurður Nordal, and her younger sister was the politician Ólöf Nordal.

== Books and articles (selected) ==
- Ethics and Action in Thirteenth-Century Iceland. Odense University Press, 1998. ISBN 8778384192.
- Tools of Literacy: The Role of Skaldic verse in Icelandic Textual Culture. Toronto University Press, 2001. ISBN 0802047890.
- "Attraction of Opposites: Skaldic Verse in Njáls Saga". In: Pernille Hermann (ed.), Literacy in Medieval and Early Modern Scandinavian Culture. University Press of Southern Denmark, 2005. ISBN 9788776740405.
- "The Art of Poetry and the Sagas of Icelanders". In: Quinn, Judy, et al. (eds.): Learning and Understanding in the Old Norse World: Essays in Honour of Margaret Clunies Ross. Brepols, 2007. ISBN 9782503525808.
- "Alternative Criteria for the Dating of the Sagas of Icelanders". In: Ney Agneta, et al. (eds)., Á austrvega: Saga and East Scandinavia: Preprint Papers of The 14th International Saga Conference. Gävle University Press, 2009. ISBN 9789197832908.
- "Rewriting History: The Fourteenth-Century Versions of Sturlunga saga". In: Emily Lethbridge and Judy Quinn (eds.), Creating the Medieval Saga: Versions, Variability and Editorial Interpretations of Old Norse Saga Literature. University Press of Southern Denmark, 2010. ISBN 9788776745325.
- Skiptidagar. Nesti handa nýrri kynslóð. Mál og menning, 2018. ISBN 9789979340355.
