= Stein A. Evensen =

Norwegian physician (born 1942)

Stein Arne Evensen (born 25 October 1942) is a Norwegian hematologist.

He was born in Oslo as a son of a physician. He finished his secondary education in 1961 and the cand.med. degree in 1968, before taking the dr.med. degree in 1972. He spent his entire career at Rikshospitalet from 1973 to 2012, in addition to being professor of medicine at the University of Oslo.

From 1998 to 2006 he served as dean of the Faculty of Medicine, University of Oslo. He ran for election as rector of the University of Oslo in 2005. Evensen has also been a board member of Rikshospitalet, Akershus University Hospital and the Norwegian Radium Hospital. He was also inducted into the Norwegian Academy of Science and Letters. In March 2017 he was decorated as a Commander of the Order of St. Olav.

In 2018 he was elected as chairman of the Nasjonalforeningen for folkehelsen.
