= Ottar Hellevik =

Norwegian legal scholar

Ottar Hellevik (born 20 June 1943) is a Norwegian sociologist of political scientist. He was the most frequently read textbook writer on sociological methodology in Norway during his time.

Hellevik was a research fellow at the Peace Research Institute Oslo and took the mag.art. degree in sociology in 1969 with the thesis Stortinget – en sosial elite?. He was hired at the University of Oslo in 1971, became a professor of political science in 1986 and has also served as dean of the Faculty of Social Sciences. He is a fellow of the Norwegian Academy of Science and Letters.

Hellevik's textbooks on the methodology of sociology and political science (especially quantitative methods) include Forskningsmetode i sosiologi og statsvitenskap, Introduction to Causal Analysis and Sosiologisk metode. During his time, his books were the most widely read on the subject in the Nordic countries altogether.

Hellevik also specialized in opinion research, holding a part-time job as research director at the gallup institute MMI from 1984. His book Nordmenn og det gode liv (1996) summarized ten years of opinion collecting through the program Norsk Monitor.
