= Sunniva Siem =

Norwegian nuclear physicist

Sunniva Siem (born 1969) is a Norwegian experimental nuclear physicist, a professor of nuclear and energy physics at the University of Oslo, and the director of the Norwegian Nuclear Research Centre.

She has served as president of the Norwegian Physical Society, and was elected to the Norwegian Academy of Science and Letters in 2017.
