= Jon-Roar Bjørkvold =

Norwegian musicologist (born 1943)

Jon-Roar Bjørkvold (born 2 March 1943) is a Norwegian musicologist.

He was born in Oslo. He was a lecturer at the University of Oslo from 1970. In 1979 he published the book Barnas egen sangbok, a collection of songs that Bjørklund had observed children sing in Norwegian kindergartens. He took the dr.philos. degree in 1981 with the thesis Den spontane barnesangen – vårt musikalske morsmål, later published in 1985, which detailed spontaneous singing in children as a "musical mother tongue". His 1989 book Det musiske menneske further developed his ideas on spontaneous singing in children.

Having completed his doctorate, Bjørklund was a professor of musicology at the University of Oslo from 1982 to 2005. He was inducted into the Norwegian Academy of Science and Letters in 1992.

Further books include Fra Akropolis til Hollywood – Filmmusikk i retorikkens lys (1988) on film scores; «Vi er de tusener ...» – Norske musikkhistorier (2003) on everyday use of music in Norway; and Med musiske våpen (2022) on the role of song during the German occupation of Norway.
