= Svein Sjøberg =

Norwegian educationalist

Svein Erlend Sjøberg (born 22 May 1943) is a Norwegian physicist and educationalist, born in Oslo. He is among the central developers of didactic methods in natural sciences in Norway.

Following his cand.real. degree with a master's thesis in physics at the University of Oslo in 1970, he also took an MA in education at the University of Leeds in 1975.

Following his attainment of the dr.philos. degree in 1982, he became an associate professor at the University of Oslo in 1985 and professor in 1993. He is known for textbooks in natural sciences for all levels of primary and secondary education, and for Naturfagenes didaktikk. Fra vitenskap til skolefag (1990, second edition 1992) and Naturfag som allmenndannelse (1998, third edition 2009).

Sjøberg also participated in the public debate on education policy. He won the University of Oslo's science communication prize in 2013.

Sjøberg was inducted into the Norwegian Academy of Technological Sciences in 2005 and the Norwegian Academy of Science and Letters in 2009.
