= Jan Erik Rekdal =

Norwegian philologist and poet

Jan Erik Rekdal (born 10 February 1951) is a Norwegian philologist and poet.

He has issued such poetry collections as Vandring på verdens vestkyst (1975), Linedanseren (1976), Sentrum i periferien (1978), Oppstandelse nærvær (1985), I Rumis skygge (1997) and Hotellvertens bedrøvelse og andre samtaler (2007).

Rekdal is a professor of Celtic languages and Irish literature at the University of Oslo. He is a member of the Norwegian Academy of Science and Letters.
