= Deborah Oughton =

Norwegian nuclear and environmental chemist

Deborah Helen Oughton is a nuclear and environmental chemist whose research concerns the movement of metals and radionuclides through soil and water, the effects of radioactive materials on the environment, and the ethics of nuclear use. Educated in the UK, she works in Norway as a professor of nuclear chemistry and environmental chemistry at the Norwegian University of Life Sciences (NMBU) in Ås, director of the university's Centre for Environmental Radioactivity (CERAD), and professor II and deputy director of the Norwegian Nuclear Research Centre at the University of Oslo.

Oughton has a 1989 Ph.D. in radiochemistry from the University of Manchester, and has been a faculty member at NMBU since 1990. She was appointed as director of CERAD in 2020, after serving as its research director since its founding. She is a member of the Norwegian Academy of Science and Letters.
