= Marit Reigstad =

Norwegian scientist

- Scientific career
- Fields: Arctic and subarctic ecosystems; Plankton; Pelagic-benthic coupling, and; Ecosystems response to a changing climate.
- Website: https://en.uit.no/ansatte/person?p_document_id=41356

Marit Reigstad is a professor at the University of Tromsø. Her research interests are in developing a comprehensive understanding on the regulatory mechanisms of carbon fluxes from the ocean's surface to depth. She has led a variety of interdisciplinary projects and expeditions including 'The Nansen Legacy' which aims are to provide a cross-disciplinary, sustainable, and holistic management of marine systems and human presence within the Barents Sea and Arctic Ocean.

While being the lead of The Nansen Legacy, Reigstad has organized key research conferences, leading discourse on climate and ecosystem changes in the seas for over 300 researchers across 19 countries.

== Education ==
Reigstad received her Ph.D. in Marine Ecology from the Department of marine biology at the University of Tromsø.

== Honours and awards ==
Dr. Reigstad has received recognition for her accomplishments, including:

- 2022 Outreach Award, Faculty of Biosciences, Fisheries and Economics, UiT
- 2016, Research Award, Faculty of Biosciences, Fisheries and Economics, UiT

== Publications ==
Dr. Reigstad has over 100 publications, with over 20,000 reads and cited over 5,000 times. Some key publications include:

1. Ice algae contributions to the benthos during a time of sea ice change: a review a supply, coupling, and fate.
2. Contrasting seasonal patterns in particle aggregation and DOM transformation in a sub-Arctic fjord.
3. Hydrography inorganic nutrients and chlorophyll a linked to sea ice cover in the Atlantic Water inflow region north of Svalbard.
