= Jan Terje Faarlund =

Norwegian linguist

Professor Jan Terje Faarlund
- Born: May 3, 1943 (age 83); Østre Toten, Norway
- Scientific career
- Fields: North Germanic languages
- Workplaces: Norwegian University of Science and Technology; University of Oslo

Jan Terje Faarlund (born May 3, 1943) is a Norwegian linguist and professor emeritus of North Germanic languages at the University of Oslo.

== Career ==
Faarlund was born in Østre Toten Municipality. His academic career began with his magister dissertation Preposisjonsuttrykkenes syntaks i moderne norsk (Prepositional Phrase Syntax in Modern Norwegian, 1974) and he has also done substantial work on grammatical issues in Norwegian. One of his most extensive works is as a coauthor of Norsk referansegrammatikk (Norwegian Reference Grammar, 1997).

Faarlund previously worked as a professor at the Norwegian University of Science and Technology. After two previous marriages, he was married to the social anthropologist Marianne Gullestad (1946–2008).

In his 2014 paper "English: The Language of the Vikings" (co-authored by Joseph Embley Emonds), Faarlund and Emonds assert that English is a Scandinavian language (or North Germanic language) which was influenced by Anglo-Saxon (a West Germanic language) which later died out. This view is at odds with the currently accepted view that English is a direct descendant of Anglo-Saxon which was merely influenced by the Norse language of the Vikings. Faarlund and Emonds' assertion, therefore, places English with Swedish and Norwegian as its closest relatives and not German, Frisian, or Dutch as is currently accepted by mainstream linguists.

== Memberships and honours ==
He was elected as a member of the Royal Norwegian Society of Sciences and Letters in 1983 and as a member of the Norwegian Academy of Science and Letters in 1996. He has also been a member of the London Philological Society since 1977.

In 2013 he was awarded the Gad Rausing Prize for Outstanding Research in the Humanities by the Royal Swedish Academy of Letters, History and Antiquities.

== Selected works ==
- Syntactic Change. Towards a Theory of Historical Syntax (1990)
- (with Svein Lie and Kjell Ivar Vannebo) Norsk referansegrammatikk (Norwegian Reference Grammar, 1997)
- Grammatical Relations in Change (2001)
- The Syntax of Old Norse (2004)
- Revolusjon i lingvistikken: Noam Chomskys språkteori (Revolution in Linguistics: Noam Chomsky's Language Theory, 2005)
- "Parameterization and Change in Non-Finite Complementation" (2007)
- English: The Language of the Vikings (with Joseph Embley Emonds), Olomouc Modern Language Monographs (2014)
