= Floyd E. Bloom =

American medical researcher (1936–2025)

- Born: October 8, 1936; Minneapolis, Minnesota, U.S.
- Died: January 8, 2025 (aged 88)
- Education: Woodrow Wilson High School (Dallas); Southern Methodist University; Washington University in St. Louis
- Scientific career
- Fields: Neuroanatomy
- Workplaces: The Scripps Research Institute; Salk Institute for Biological Studies

Floyd Elliott Bloom (October 8, 1936 – January 8, 2025) was an American medical researcher. He had a broad impact on the neurosciences, with interests including pharmacology, chemical neuroanatomy, electrophysiology, behavior, neurological diseases such as alcohol and drug abuse, and neuroHIV.

He received an A.B., cum laude from Southern Methodist University in 1956 and an M.D., cum laude from the Washington University in St. Louis School of Medicine in 1960. The next two years he spent as an intern and resident at the Barnes-Jewish Hospital.

He was chairman emeritus of the Department of Neuropharmacology at The Scripps Research Institute in La Jolla, California, past president of the American Association for the Advancement of Science, former editor-in-chief of Science (1995–2000), director of Behavioral Neurobiology at the Salk Institute for Biological Studies, and chief of the Laboratory of Neuropharmacology of the National Institute of Mental Health. In 1989, he was inducted into the Woodrow Wilson High School Hall of Fame. He was a member of the National Academy of Sciences, the American Academy of Arts and Sciences, the American Association for Anatomy, and the American Philosophical Society.

Bloom died on January 8, 2025, at the age of 88.
