= Kristín Vala Ragnarsdóttir =

Icelandic academic (born 1954)

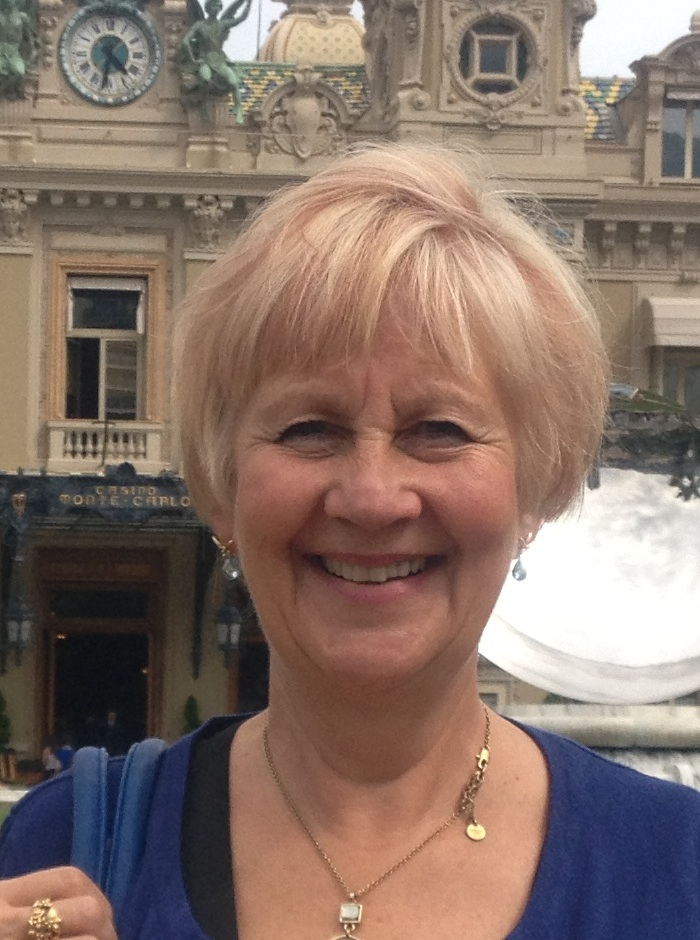
Kristín Vala in 2013

Kristín Vala Ragnarsdóttir (born 1954) is an Icelandic Earth and sustainability scientist and activist who is Professor of Sustainability Science in the Faculty of Earth Sciences and the Institute of Earth Sciences at the University of Iceland. She was the first woman to be a full professor in Earth Sciences at the University of Bristol in the UK and at the same time the first woman to become a full professor in the Science Faculty there. She was also the first woman to serve as Dean of a School at the University of Iceland.

Kristín Vala is a member of Academia Europaea (since 2012), the Norwegian Academy of Science and Letters, and the Icelandic Academy of Science. She is a fellow of the Royal Society of Arts, distinguished fellow of the Schumacher Institute, and a member of the Wellbeing Economy Alliance. She is a member of the sustainability think tanks the Balaton Group and the Club of Rome.

== Career ==
=== Appointments ===
Kristín Vala was on the faculty of the University of Bristol for 20 years from 1989, starting as a research fellow in the Department of Geology, becoming professor of Environmental Geochemistry in the Department of Earth Sciences in 2001 and professor of Environmental Sustainability from 2006 to 2008. She moved to the University of Iceland as Professor of Sustainability Science in the Faculty of Earth Sciences in 2008, and was Dean of the School of Engineering and Natural Sciences from 2008 to 2012.

=== Board memberships ===
Kristín Vala was a board member of the Geological Society of London the European Association of Geochemistry, and the Schumacher Society (now Schumacher Institute). She was a member of the steering committee of the Balaton Group, and the Alliance for Sustainability and Prosperity (ASAP). She was also on the board/steering group of TreeSisters, Pyramid2030, 17Goals, Health Empowernment Through Nutrition, Framtíðarlandið (FutureIceland), Initiative for Equality, Landvernd (Nature Protection) and Landsvirkjun (National Energy).

Kristín Vala is a scientific advisor to the Ecological Sequestration Trust, serves on the global council of Wellbeing Economy Alliance (WEAll) and is a board member of Breiddalssetur Science and Culture Centre, and the Red Cross.

=== Editorial memberships ===
Kristín Vala was a member of the editorial boards of eEarth, Geochemical Transactions, Geochimica et Cosmochimice Acta and Chemical Geology.

Currently, she is a member of the editorial boards of Anthropocene Review, System Change, BioPhysical Economics and Sustainability (previously BioPhysical Economics and Resource Quality), and Solutions (for a Sustainable and Desirable Future).

== Background ==
=== Training ===
Kristín Vala trained in geochemistry and petrology at the University of Iceland and geological sciences at Northwestern University, Evanston, Illinois.

=== Awards ===
Kristín Vala received the Award of Excellence Furthering Sustainability and Equality Learning from the Schumacher Institute. She was co-recipient of the Times Higher Education Supplement (THES) Award to the University of Bristol for Outstanding Contribution to Sustainable Development.

=== Expert member panels ===
Kristín Vala was a member of the UN Environment Program Depleted Uranium Scientific Assessment Teams, Kosovo (2000) and Bosnia Herzegovina (2002). She was a member of the International Expert Working Group of the Government of Bhutan on the New Development Paradigm (2013) and represented Academia Europaea in the European Academies Scientific Advisory Council (EASAC) working group on the Circular Economy (2016).

In Iceland, Kristín Vala has advised the government on issues relating to higher education and research, education for sustainability, climate strategy, prosperity, quality of life and wellbeing, and energy policy.

== Research ==
During her career, Kristín Vala has published over 100 research articles, book chapters, and books and has been awarded prizes and memberships/fellowships by academies and sustainability think tanks.

Among many other topics, Kristín Vala has published work on geothermal systems, mineral solubility, mineral dissolution kinetics, structure and coordination of aqueous species, sorption of aqueous species to mineral surfaces, backfill materials for radioactive waste disposal, link between environment and health, bacterial and fungal weathering, and critical zone processes.

At the turn of the century, Kristín Vala's research turned to issues related to transdisciplinary sustainability science, including city carbon emission management, natural resource availability and management, soil sustainability, sustainable tourism, and achieving the UN Sustainability Goals through the wellbeing economy.

== Politics ==
Kristín Vala is a member of the Pirate Party and has been influential in developing its policies relating to environment, climate, and sustainability. She was instrumental in facilitating the participation of the Icelandic government in joining the Wellbeing Economy Governments (WEGo).

== Selected bibliography ==
=== Books ===
- Ragnarsdottir K.V. and Banwart S.A. (editors) (2016) Soil: The Life Supporting Skin on Earth. eBook University of Iceland and University of Sheffield.
- Plant J.A., Voulvoulis N. and Ragnarsdottir K.V. (editors) (2011) Pollutants, Human Health and the Environment. A Risk Approach. Wiley Blackwell, 356 pages.
- Hancock P.L. and Skinner B.J. (editors), D.l. Dineley (associate editor) and Dawson A.G., Ragnarsdottir K.V. and Steward I.S. (subject editors) (2000) The Oxford Companion to the Earth, 1174 pp. Oxford University Press.

=== Book chapters ===
- Lohrenz U., Sverdrup H.U. and Ragnarsdottir K.V. (2018) Global megatrends and resource use - A systemic reflection. In H. Lehmann (ed) Factor X. Eco-Efficiency in Industry and Science vol 32. Springer, Berlin.
- Thorarinsdottir, R., Coaten, D., Pantanella, E., Shultz, C., Stander, H. and Ragnarsdottir, K.V. (2017) Renewable energy use for aquaponics development on global scale towards sustainable food production. In J. Bundschuh, G. Chen, D. Chandrasekharam, J. Piechocki (Eds.) Geothermal, Wind and Solar Energy Applications in Agriculture and Aquaculture, Sustainable Energy Development Series, CRC Press, 362 pages.
