= Susanne Viefers =

German-Norwegian physicist

Susanne Friederike Viefers
- Born: 28 March 1970 (age 56); Orsoy, Germany
- Education: University of Oslo
- Occupation: Theoretical physicist

Susanne Friederike Viefers (born 1970) is a German-Norwegian theoretical physicist interested in low-dimensional quantum systems including the Quantum Hall effect, Bose–Einstein condensates, and anyons. She is a professor of theoretical physics at the University of Oslo in Norway.

== Education and career ==
Viefers was born on 28 March 1970 in Orsoy, Germany. She moved to Norway as a teenager, but retains her German citizenship. She did all of her studies at the University of Oslo, earning a bachelor's degree in 1992, a master's degree in 1993, and a doctorate (Dr. Sci.) in 1997. Her dissertation was Field theory of anyons and the fractional quantum Hall effect.

After postdoctoral research at the Nordic Institute for Theoretical Physics in Copenhagen, Denmark, at the University of Jyväskylä in Finland, and at Chalmers University of Technology in Gothenburg, Sweden, she returned to the University of Oslo as an associate professor in 2002, and she was promoted to full professor in 2007.

== Recognition ==
Viefers was elected to the Norwegian Academy of Science and Letters in 2017.

== Selected publications ==
- Bøe, Maria Vetleseter & Viefers, Susanne Friederike (2021). Secondary and University Students’ Descriptions of Quantum Uncertainty and the Wave Nature of Quantum Particles. Science & Education. ISSN 0926-7220. doi: 10.1007/s11191-021-00297-w. Full text in Research Archive
- Hansson, Thors Hans; Hermanns, Maria; Simon, Steven H & Viefers, Susanne F (2017). Quantum Hall Physics - hierarchies and CFT techniques. Reviews of Modern Physics. ISSN 0034-6861. 89(2). doi: 10.1103/RevModPhys.89.025005. Full text in Research Archive
- Meyer, Marius Ladegård; Liabøtrø, Ola & Viefers, Susanne F (2016). Linear dependencies between composite fermion states. Journal of Physics A: Mathematical and Theoretical. ISSN 1751-8113. 49(39). doi: 10.1088/1751-8113/49/39/395201.
- Meyer, Marius Ladegård; Sreejith, Ganesh Jaya & Viefers, Susanne F (2014). Rotational properties of two-component Bose gases in the lowest Landau level. Physical Review A. Atomic, Molecular, and Optical Physics (PRA). ISSN 1050-2947. 89(4). doi: 10.1103/PhysRevA.89.043625. Full text in Research Archive
- Manninen, M; Viefers, Susanne F & Reimann, S (2012). Quantum rings for beginners II: Bosons versus fermions. Physica. E, Low-Dimensional systems and nanostructures. ISSN 1386-9477. 46, p. 119–132. doi: 10.1016/j.physe.2012.09.013.
