= Paul Lauren =

American historian

Paul G. Lauren
- Scientific career
- Workplaces: University of Montana

Paul Gordon Lauren is an American historian and Regents Professor Emeritus of History at the University of Montana.

== Books ==
- Diplomats and Bureaucrats. Stanford, CA: Hoover Institution Press, 1976.
- Diplomacy: New Approaches in History, Theory, and Policy. New York: Free Press, 1979.
- The China Hands Legacy: Ethics and Diplomacy. Boulder: Westview Press, 1987.
- Power and Prejudice: The Politics and Diplomacy of Racial Discrimination. Boulder: Westview Press, 1988. 2nd Ed., HarperCollins, 1996.
- Destinies Shared. Boulder: Westview Press, 1989.
- The Evolution of International Human Rights: Visions Seen. Philadelphia: University of Pennsylvania Press, 1998. 3rd Ed., 2011.
- Force and Statecraft: Diplomatic Challenges of Our Time. 5th Ed. (with Gordon A. Craig and Alexander George) New York: Oxford University Press, 2014.
