= Wiener – Anspach Foundation =

The Philippe Wiener – Maurice Anspach Foundation is a Belgian public interest organisation that promotes scientific collaborations, in every field, between the Université libre de Bruxelles and the Universities of Oxford and Cambridge. This collaboration was recently strengthened through the signature of memoranda of understanding between these academic institutions.

The Foundation enables graduates and researchers from the ULB to access the leading research centres of the two British universities. It also gives graduates and researchers from Oxford and Cambridge Universities the opportunity to work at the ULB.

In order to promote the interactions between these three universities, the Foundation organises conferences and encourages contacts between academics by funding short-term visits. It also supports collaborative research projects.

Among the British academics recently invited to the ULB by the Foundation are Prof. John Bell (Cambridge), Prof. Guy Goodwin-Gill (Cambridge), Prof. Hermione Lee (Oxford) and Prof. Avi Shlaim (Oxford).

== History ==
The Foundation was established in 1965 by Phyllis Agnès Beddington to honour the memory of her husband, Philippe Wiener, who died during World War II in the Esterwegen camp, where he was imprisoned as a political opponent. Mrs Beddington later decided to add to her husband's name the name of Maurice Anspach, a close friend of Philippe Wiener, in appreciation for his generous help during and after the war.

== Alumni ==
Since 1965 the Foundation has awarded hundreds of grants and fellowships. It counts among its Alumni Conservative MP Jo Johnson, social entrepreneur David Grayson, Belgian politician Paul Magnette, British barrister Peter Duffy and British lawyers Michael Wood and Christopher Vajda. The latter was appointed in 2012 as the UK Judge to the European Court of Justice.
