= Marit Veierød =

Norwegian biostatistician and epidemiologist

Marit Bragelien Veierød is a Norwegian biostatistician and epidemiologist whose research focuses on environmental factors related to melanoma, a type of skin cancer. She is a professor at the University of Oslo, affiliated with the Oslo Centre for Biostatistics and Epidemiology and Department of Biostatistics in the Institute of Basic Medical Sciences.

== Education and career ==
Veierød earned a candidate (master's) degree in statistics from the University of Oslo in 1988, and worked for a private firm for five years. She returned to study in medical statistics at the University of Oslo in 1994, and completed her Ph.D. in 1999.

After continuing as a postdoctoral researcher, she became an associate professor of biostatistics in the Section of Medical Statistics, Department of Nutrition, and Section of Health Science of the University of Oslo. She transferred to the Department of Biostatistics in 2004, and became its head from 2005 to 2007. She was promoted to full professor in 2010.

== Recognition ==
Veierød was elected to the Norwegian Academy of Science and Letters in 2016.
