= Aud Valborg Tønnessen =

Aud Valborg Tønnessen (born 1 June 1964) is a Norwegian Lutheran theologian, church historian, professor of theology and the dean of the Faculty of Theology at the University of Oslo. She is an expert on Norwegian church history and Christian international humanitarian work. She was elected as a member of the Norwegian Academy of Science and Letters in 2016.

== Selected works ==
- Tønnessen, Aud Valborg: Kirkens Nødhjelp: Bistand, tro og politikk, Oslo: Gyldendal Norsk Forlag, 2007. ISBN 978-82-05-37227-6
- Jensen, Roger, Dag Thorkildsen og Aud Valborg Tønnessen (ed.): Kirke, protestantisme og samfunn: Festskrift til professor dr. Ingun Montgomery, Trondheim: Tapir Akademisk Forlag, 2006. ISBN 8251921171
- Tønnessen, Aud Valborg: "... et trygt og godt hjem for alle"? Kirkelederes kritikk av velferdsstaten etter 1945, Trondheim: Tapir Akademisk Forlag, 2000. ISBN 82-519-1611-9
