= Gudrun Holgersen =

Norwegian legal scholar

Gudrun Holgersen (born 15 April 1950) is a Norwegian legal scholar.

She was born in Stavanger. She took her cand.jur. degree at the University of Oslo in 1975 and the dr.juris. degree at the University of Bergen in 1991. She then became appointed as law professor at the University of Bergen. She is a fellow of the Norwegian Academy of Science and Letters from 2009.

From 1987 to 1995 she led Klagenemnda for likestilling, and later became deputy leader of the Norwegian Equality and Anti-Discrimination Tribunal. She led the committee that publisher the Norwegian Official Report in 2002 against ethnic discrimination. She resides in Nesttun.
