= Kjersti Bale =

Norwegian philologist

Kjersti Bale (born 30 March 1959) is a Norwegian philologist.

She is a professor at the Department of Literature, Area Studies and European Languages, University of Oslo. She headed the aesthetics study programme from its inception in 2003 to 2005, and headed her Department from 2009 to 2012. She is a co-editor of the Journal of Aesthetics & Culture and editorial board member of Agora. Among her literary interests are Cora Sandel and Michel de Montaigne.

She is a member of the Norwegian Academy of Science and Letters. She has also chaired the board of Gyldendal's Endowment, which awards the Gyldendal Prize and the Sult Prize.
