= Rolf Anker Ims =

Norwegian ecologist (born 1958)

Rolf Anker Ims (born 19 May 1958) is a Norwegian ecologist.

He was born in Oslo. He took the dr.philos. degree in 1989, and was appointed as a professor of landscape ecology at the University of Oslo in 1992. In 2001 he moved to the University of Tromsø. He became a member of the Norwegian Academy of Science and Letters in 2000.
