= Siri Gloppen =

Norwegian political scientist (born 1964)

Siri Gloppen (born 30 March 1964) is a Norwegian political scientist who currently serves as professor of Comparative Politics at the University of Bergen (UiB), Senior Researcher at the Chr. Michelsen Institute for Research on Development and Justice (CMI), and Director of the CMI-UiB Center on Law and Social Transformation.

Gloppen has been research coordinator at PluriCourts, University of Oslo and Scientific Director for the Bergen Summer Research School (BSRS) 2014. She is also affiliated with the Centre for Policy Research in New Delhi.

Gloppen is a board member of the Rafto Foundation for Human Rights since 2002 and was head of the Rafto Prize Committee 2010–2011. Since 2019, she has been a member of the Lancet–SIGHT Commission on Peaceful Societies Through Health and Gender Equality, chaired by Tarja Halonen.
