= Kjersti Fløttum =

Norwegian linguist

Kjersti Fløttum (born 12 July 1953) is a Norwegian linguist.

After a tenure at Stavanger University College she was employed by the University of Bergen in 1995 where she is a professor of French language. She has been vice rector of international relations and from 2007 to 2011 led the Bergen Summer Research School.

Fløttum is also vice-consul for France in Bergen, and has been active in the Rafto Foundation.
