= Norwegian Academy of Science and Letters =

Academy of sciences

- Det Norske Videnskaps-Akademi
- Formation: 1811; 215 years ago
- Headquarters: Oslo, Norway
- Members: 538 Norwegian Fellows; 417 Foreign Members
- Patron: Haakon VIII
- President: Annelin Eriksen
- Vice-presidents: Kjetil Taskén and Terje Lohndal
- General secretary: Marit Westergaard
- Staff: 16
- Website: https://dnva.no/

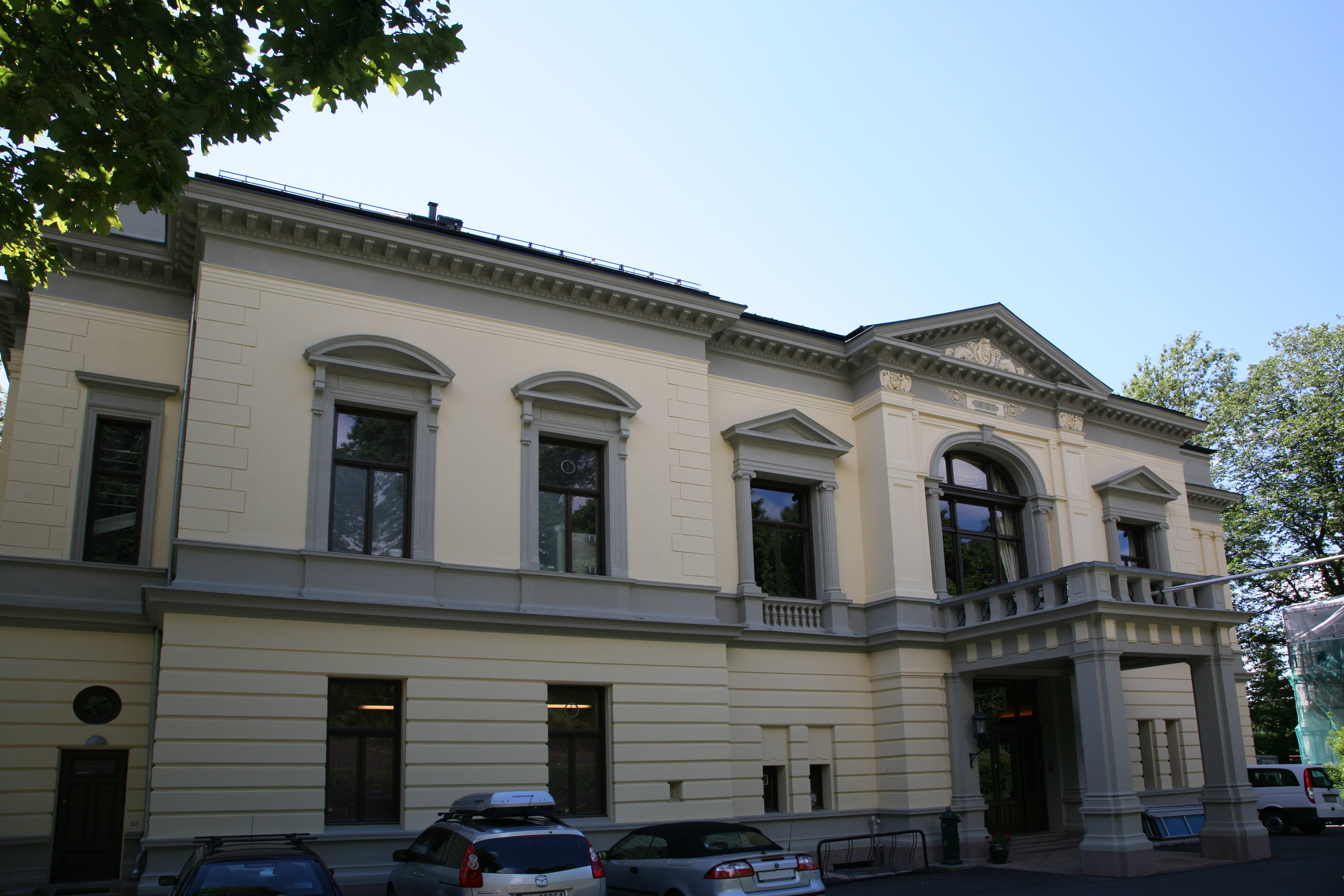
The Norwegian Academy of Science and Letters building in Drammensveien

The Norwegian Academy of Science and Letters (Norwegian: Det Norske Videnskaps-Akademi, DNVA) is a learned society based in Oslo, Norway. Its purpose is to support the advancement of science and scholarship in Norway.

== History ==
The Royal Frederick University in Christiania was established in 1811. The idea of a learned society in Christiania surfaced for the first time in 1841. The city of Trondhjem had no university, but had a learned society, the Royal Norwegian Society of Sciences and Letters, established in 1760. The purpose of a learned society in Christiania was to support scientific studies and aid publication of academic papers. The idea of the Humboldt-inspired university, where independent research stood strong, had overtaken the instrumental view of a university as primarily a means to produce civil servants. The city already had societies for specific professions, for instance the Norwegian Medical Society, which was founded in 1833. However, these societies were open to both academics within medicine as well as physicians outside of academia. The learned society would be open to employed academics only, but from all academic branches.

The idea did not come to immediate fruition in 1841. Money was a problem; also there were "doubts with regards to the adequacy of the scientific powers". However, cross-disciplinary cooperation was flourishing. The first scientific congress in Norway was held in 1844. Two hundred people within the natural sciences and medicine convened for the fourth Scandinavian meeting of natural researchers. Finally, in 1857 a source of finances was found: professor of medicine Frants C. Faye. The academy was founded, and inaugurated on 3 May 1857 under the name Videnskabsselskabet i Christiania. "Christiania" was later changed to "Kristiania". The name Det Norske Videnskaps-Akademi i Kristiania was adopted in the early twentieth century, and from 1924 "i Kristiania" was dropped, when Oslo voted to return the name to its original Norwegian name.

The economic support from the state was minimal during the society's first fifty years. As such the academy led a humble existence. In the early twentieth century, Waldemar Christofer Brøgger (later the university's first rector) suggested a plan to strengthen the academy. He established the Nansen Foundation, specifically tied to the academy to strengthen its economy. Brøgger's goal was to employ researchers specifically within the academy to secure independence from the university; however, this proposal never happened. The purpose of the academy remained to advance science and scholarship in general through meetings, seminars and support of research and publications. Nonetheless, the Nansen Foundation and other economic sources were important. They helped in the establishment of other bodies, such as the Institute for Comparative Research in Human Culture. These foundations lost some of their importance after World War II. However, an entirely new source of funding was later found, as Otto Lous Mohr suggested to use surplus from a state-owned, national lottery. The establishment of Norsk Tipping was laid down in 1946, and founded in 1947. The Norwegian Academy of Science and Letters wished to administer this income through a council of its own, but the Government of Norway refused and created the research council NAVF (Norges allmennvitenskapelige forskningsråd, the Norwegian Council of General Research). The academy could merely suggest representatives for this council. Ever since then, the state-driven research councils have been more important than the academy, economically. NAVF and other bodies were merged in 1993 to become the Research Council of Norway.

== Organisation ==
The General Meeting is the supreme body of the academy. The board of the academy consists of its president, Secretary General and vice-president together with the chairman, vice-chairman and secretary of the two divisions, Mathematics and Natural Sciences and Humanities and Social Sciences.

As of 2025 the President of the academy is professor of social anthropology, Annelin Eriksen (UiB). Vice presidents are Kjetil Taskén and Terje Lohndal. King Harald V of Norway is honorary president.

The academy aims to fulfill its mission by initiating and supporting research, organizing meetings and international conferences, publishing scientific writings and appointing representatives to national and international bodies. Each year, the academy organizes at least 12 open meetings with topics covering a wide range of academic disciplines.

As of 1 April 2021, the academy had 946 members, of which 535 were Norwegian and 411 foreign. The members are divided into the mathematics and science class, and the humanities and social sciences class.

=== Prizes and other activities ===
The academy is responsible for awarding the Abel Prize in mathematics and the Kavli Prize in astrophysics, nanoscience and neuroscience. It also represents Norway in the International Council for Science (ICSU), the Union Académique Internationale (UAI), the European Science Foundation (ESF) and the All European Academies (ALLEA). The academy is also part of the European Science Academies Advisory Council (EASAC) and one representative from the academy is stationed at the headquarters in Brussels. Its aim is to promote science based governing.

The academy has approximately 900 members, both foreign and Norwegian. Prize winners are also added to the member lists upon being awarded.

== See also ==
- List of members of the Norwegian Academy of Science and Letters
