= List of rectors of the University of Oslo =

The rector of the University of Oslo is the university's highest officer, who serves as both its chief executive, its ceremonial head and as chairperson of the university board. The rector is directly elected among the (full) professors by all the members of the university community, that is academic employees, students and technical-administrative staff, who received the right to vote in this order. Until 1989, only professors were eligible to stand for election, although so far all rectors have been professors at the university. The rector's deputy and the university's second highest official, the pro-rector, is also directly elected at the same time. Both the rector and the pro-rector are elected for four-year terms and may stand for reelection to the same office once. The rectorate may also include one or more appointed vice-rectors, who rank below both the rector and the pro-rector. The rectorate forms the university's senior leadership and has the overall responsibility for the management of the university; they are assisted by the director of the university, who heads the technical-administrative staff, but who is subordinate to the rectorate (the rector, pro-rector and vice-rectors).

The office of rector was instituted by law in 1905, and made effective in 1907. From 1845 to 1907, the Collegium academicum, the highest body of the university, elected a chairman among its members to serve for one year. From 1814 to 1845, the university had a Chancellor, which was only a ceremonial office held by the Lord Lieutenant (stattholder), and a Pro-Chancellor, who was the deputy of the Chancellor and ex officio chairman of the Collegium academicum.

== Chancellors, 1814–1844 ==
Term	Chancellor
1814–1816	Count Hans Henric von Essen
1816–1818	Count Carl Mörner
1818–1824	Count Johan August Sandels
1818–1824	Crown Prince Oscar

== Pro-Chancellors, 1814–1845 ==
Term	Pro-Chancellor
1814–1822	Bishop Frederik Julius Bech
1823–1828	Professor Niels Treschow
1828–1840	Count Herman Wedel-Jarlsberg
1840–1845	Bishop Christian Sørenssen

== Chairmen of the Collegium academicum, 1845–1907 ==
Term	Chairman of the Collegium academicum	Field of study
?	?	?

== Rectors, 1907–present ==
Term	Rector	Field of study
1907–1911	Waldemar Christofer Brøgger	Mineralogy and geology
1912–1918	Bredo Henrik von Munthe af Morgenstierne	Jurisprudence, economics, and statistics
1919–1921	Fridtjof Nansen^{1}	Zoology and oceanography
1919–1921	Axel Holst	Medicine
1921–1927	Fredrik Stang	Jurisprudence
1928–1936	Sem Sæland	Physics
1937–1941	Didrik Arup Seip	North Germanic languages
1941–1945	Adolf Hoel^{2}	Geology
1946–1951	Otto Lous Mohr	Medicine
1952–1957	Frede Castberg	Jurisprudence
1958–1963	Johan Tidemann Ruud	Marine biology
1964–1969	Hans Vogt	Romance languages
1970–1972	Johs. Andenæs	Jurisprudence
1973–1976	Otto Bastiansen	Chemistry
1977–1984	Bjarne A. Waaler	Medicine
1985–1992	Inge Lønning	Theology
1993–1998	Lucy Smith	Jurisprudence
1999–2001	Kaare R. Norum	Nutritional science
2002–2005	Arild Underdal	Political science
2006–2009	Geir Ellingsrud	Mathematics
2009–2017	Ole Petter Ottersen	Medicine
2017–2025	Svein Stølen	Chemistry
2025-present	Ragnhild Hennum	Law

1: Fridtjof Nansen was elected rector of the university for the term 1919–1921, but never assumed office.
2: Following the arrest of Didrik Arup Seip during the occupation of Norway by Nazi Germany, the occupying powers appointed the polar researcher Adolf Hoel as rector of the university.

== Pro-Rectors ==
- 1941–1943 Professor Adolf Hoel (Mathematics and Natural Sciences)^{1}
- 1957 Professor Harald Ulrik Sverdrup (Mathematics and Natural Sciences)
- 1957–1960 Professor Alf Sommerfelt (Humanities)
- 1961–1963 Professor Johs. Andenæs (Law)
- 1964–1966 Professor Axel Strøm (Medicine)
- 1967–1969 Professor Alf Brodal (Medicine)
- 1970–1972 Professor Otto Bastiansen (Mathematics and Natural Sciences)
- 1973–1976 Professor Knut Kolsrud (Humanities)
- 1977–1980 Professor Jacob Jervell (Theology)
- 1981–1984 Professor Knut Erik Tranøy (Humanities)
- 1985–1988 Professor Bjørn Pedersen (Mathematics and Natural Sciences)
- 1989–1992 Professor Jens Erik Fenstad (Mathematics and Natural Sciences)
- 1993–1995 Professor Arild Underdal (Social Sciences)
- 1996–1998 Professor Knut Fægri (Mathematics and Natural Sciences)
- 1999–2001 Professor Rolv Mikkel Blakar (Social Sciences)
- 2002–2005 Professor Anne-Brit Kolstø (Mathematics and Natural Sciences)
- 2006–2009 Professor Haakon Breien Benestad (Medicine)
- 2009–2013 Associate Professor Inga Bostad (Humanities)
- 2013–2014 Professor Ruth Vatvedt Fjeld (Humanities)^{2}
- 2014–2017 Professor Ragnhild Hennum (Law)
- 2017-2021 Professor Gro Bjørnerud Mo (Humanities)
- 2021-2025 Professor Åse Gornitzka (Social Sciences)
- 2025- Professor Bjørn Jamtveit (Mathematics and Natural Sciences)

1: Following the arrest of Didrik Arup Seip during the occupation of Norway by Nazi Germany, the occupying powers appointed the polar researcher Adolf Hoel as prorector, and later rector of the university.
2: Ruth Vatvedt Fjeld resigned from her position in 2014.
