= If Women Counted =

1988 book by Marilyn Waring

If Women Counted: A New Feminist Economics
- Author: Marilyn Waring
- Language: English
- Genre: Political economy, feminism, feminist economics
- Publisher: Harper & Row, Macmillan‚ Allen & Unwin
- Publication date: 1988
- Media type: Print (Hardcover & Paperback)
- Pages: 386 pp (Harper & Row edition)
- ISBN: 0-06-250933-0

If Women Counted (1988) is a book by New Zealand academic and former politician Marilyn Waring, that is regarded as the "founding document" of the discipline of feminist economics. The book is a groundbreaking and systematic critique of the system of national accounts, the international standard of measuring economic growth, and the ways in which women's unpaid work as well as the value of Nature have been excluded from what counts as productive in the economy.

The book "persuaded the United Nations to redefine gross domestic product, inspired new accounting methods in dozens of countries, and became the founding document of the discipline of feminist economics." A widely cited book, it made the analysis of this topic known to a large audience.

The book's core argument can be summarised as follows: "UNSNA's rules to determine what should be defined as economic activity needed to be understood as an expression of patriarchal power that valued militarism, environmental destruction, and tools of colonisation while deeming peace, environmental resources, and social reproduction worthless."

== Synopsis ==
Written from a feminist point of view and drawing from statistical data, Waring challenges the assumptions underlying national income accounting. In particular, she problematises the fact that women's unpaid work as well as the value of nature are not accounted for in national income accounting, which, according to her, implies a sexual discrimination that allows for the continued domination of women. Waring observes that not all categories included in calculations of a country's gross domestic product (GDP), such as the state sector, are market activities, which leads her to criticise the fact that housework is left out of these calculations.

== Context ==
Waring was elected to the New Zealand Parliament in 1975. She was part of the Public Expenditure Committee, at a time when New Zealand was adapting its national accounts system to fit the United Nations’ directives. Through this work, she realized that the work performed by women and by natural resources that make life on earth possible (such as lakes, beaches, fresh air, trees) were both invisible in national accounts. In that way, they counted as unproductive, or counted for nothing; and therefore would not be addressed by any public policies.

Waring later comments: "If you are invisible as a producer in a nation' s economy, you are invisible in the distribution of benefits (unless they label you as a welfare 'problem' or a burden)."

Driven by such realisation, she conducted in depth investigation on the rules of the United Nations System of National Accounts (UNSNA), which led to the publication of this book.

== Influence ==
Waring's argumentation builds on traditions of feminism and feminist economics. The recognitions of the exclusion of women and nature from accounts of the productive economy makes If Women Counted a relevant contribution in discussions around ecofeminism. Although Waring's book led to the revision of national accounting by the United Nations, critics emphasise the ongoing importance of If Women Counted for political economy and feminist economics as long as unpaid housework and impacts on nature are not accounted for in these statistics.

The book, and Waring's work in general, can also be considered as being historically significant and influential for the degrowth movement: first, in its argument of economic growth being both in theory and in practice connected to the oppression of women and ecological degradation, and second in its emphasis on the false representation economic indicators offer of the true wellbeing of communities.

If Women Counted inspired the anthology Counting on Marilyn Waring: New Advances in Feminist Economics, edited by Margunn Bjørnholt and Ailsa McKay. Published in 2014 and written by a diverse group of scholars, it maps new advances in the field of feminist economics since the publication of If Women Counted.

It was described by economist Alison Preston as "a timely reminder of the politics and economics underpinning what, how and by whom activities and outputs are valued. For those concerned with social justice and sustainable futures this important and powerful book provides an invaluable and practical insight into issues that are in need of greater visibility."

According to the magazine Choice: Current Reviews for Academic Libraries, the book explores "a wide range of issues—including the fundamental meaning of economic growth and activity to consumption, health care, mortality, unpaid household work, mothering, education, nutrition, equality, and sustainability" and reveals "the breadth, depth, and substance that can grow from innovative ideas and critical analysis."

Diane Elson argues that "despite many valiant efforts, women do not as yet really count in the conduct of economic policy. This book is an imaginative contribution to an ongoing struggle."

== Reception ==
According to emeritus professor of economics Julie A. Nelson, "Marilyn Waring's work woke people up. She showed exactly how the unpaid work traditionally done by women has been made invisible within national accounting systems, and the damage this causes. Her book [...] encouraged and influenced a wide range of work on ways, both numerical and otherwise, of valuing, preserving, and rewarding the work of care that sustains our lives. By pointing to a similar neglect of the natural environment, she also issued a wake-up call to issues of ecological sustainability that have only grown more pressing over time. In recent decades, the field of feminist economics has broadened and widened to encompass these topics and more."

The noted economist John Kenneth Galbraith called If Women Counted "a splendid work... no concerned man or woman can ignore it."

The book is discussed in Melinda Gates' book The Moment of Lift: How Empowering Women Changes the World.

In a reflection on If Women Counted, Ulla Grapard, professor of economics and women's studies at Colgate University, comments : "If Women Counted opened my eyes further. After reading the book, I kept on seeing connections to many other things that I was observing, reading, writing and simply living. Unpaid care work, as we call it now, was everywhere."

== Publication history ==
Originally published by Harper & Row as If Women Counted with an introduction by Gloria Steinem in 1988, it has since also been published by Macmillan under the same title, and by Allen & Unwin and the University of Toronto Press as Counting for Nothing. The book remains most widely known under the title If Women Counted and has been translated into several languages.

At the time she wrote the book, Waring was a visiting fellow at the John F. Kennedy School of Government at Harvard University.

== Film adaptation ==
- The documentary film Who's Counting? Marilyn Waring on Sex, Lies and Global Economics (1995), by Oscar-winning film director Terre Nash, is largely based on the book.

== Literature ==
- Bjørnholt, Margunn; McKay, Ailsa, eds. (2014). Counting on Marilyn Waring: New Advances in Feminist Economics. Toronto: Demeter Press. ISBN 9781927335277.
