= Ailsa McKay =

Scottish economist (1963–2014)

Professor Ailsa McKay
- Born: 7 June 1963
- Died: 5 March 2014 (aged 50)
- Education: University of Stirling; University of Nottingham
- Occupation: Professor of economics
- Employer: Glasgow Caledonian University
- Known for: Research on gender inequalities and the economics of the welfare state, feminist economics and universal basic income

Ailsa McKay (7 June 1963 – 5 March 2014) was a Scottish economist, government policy adviser, a leading feminist economist and Professor of Economics at Glasgow Caledonian University.

She was noted for her research on gender inequalities and the economics of the welfare state, for her contributions to feminist economics, as a leading proponent of the universal basic income concept and as one of the UK's foremost experts on gender budgeting. She served as Vice Dean of the Glasgow School for Business and Society, and was also well known for her support of Scottish independence and as a key adviser to the Scottish government and First Minister Alex Salmond on economic and welfare state policies. Ailsa McKay is highlighted as a leading intellectual figure in the campaign for independence in Alex Salmond's 2015 book The Dream Shall Never Die. Both Salmond and his successor Nicola Sturgeon have highlighted McKay's influence on Scottish gender equality policies.

She was a member of the board of directors of the left-wing Jimmy Reid Foundation think tank, and was an adviser to the United Nations. With Margunn Bjørnholt, she co-edited the book Counting on Marilyn Waring: New Advances in Feminist Economics, which was published days before her death. The Ailsa McKay Fellowship, the Ailsa McKay Lecture, one of the foremost honours in feminist economics, and the McKay House at Lenzie Academy are named in her honour.

== Education ==
She held a 1st class BA Hons from the University of Stirling and a PhD from the University of Nottingham.

== Career and work ==
McKay joined Glasgow Caledonian University as a lecturer in economics in 1991. She later became head of department for economics and international business and Vice Dean of the Glasgow School for Business and Society. She was Reader in Gender and Economics until her 2011 appointment as Professor of Economics.

Her research focused on gender inequalities and the economics of the welfare state, and she served as a consultant to the Scottish Parliament, the Irish Government, Her Majesty's Treasury, and the United Nations Development Programme. Since 2006, she held the visiting chair in gender studies at the Complutense University of Madrid, and was invited as an expert witness to give evidence during the budget process to the Scottish Parliament and the Parliament of Canada. She was a leading authority on gender budget analysis in the United Kingdom. She was also a business commentator for The Herald newspaper. In 2012 she was appointed by the Scottish Government as a member of the Expert Working Group on Welfare and Constitutional Reform.

Her 2005 book The Future of Social Security Policy is according to Almaz Zelleke in Basic Income Studies, a "feminist critique of the neoclassical economic framework in which social security policies are traditionally assessed". The work argues that "this framework is biased in a way that prioritizes income-maintenance aspects of social security policy above all others."

McKay was a founding member of the Scottish Women's Budget Group, a founding member of the European Gender Budget Network, a board member of the Jimmy Reid Foundation and chairperson of the European chapter of the International Association for Feminist Economics (IAFFE).

She was noted as a proponent of Scottish independence and a citizens' basic income. She was also a contributor to the Jimmy Reid Foundation's Common Weal reports, including a report on welfare which was published after her death.

=== Universal basic income ===
McKay was a noted and early proponent of the universal basic income concept from a feminist and gender equality perspective. She argued in 2001 that "social policy reform should take account of all gender inequalities and not just those relating to the traditional labor market" and that "the citizens' basic income model can be a tool for promoting gender-neutral social citizenship rights."

=== Counting on Marilyn Waring: New Advances in Feminist Economics ===
Her final academic work is Counting on Marilyn Waring: New Advances in Feminist Economics, a new anthology in the field of feminist economics that went into print just days before her death, that aims to map the development in the field in the last two decades. In the opening chapter, "Advances in Feminist Economics in Times of Economic Crisis," McKay and her co-editor Margunn Bjørnholt call for a reshaping of the economy, economic theory and the economics profession, taking into account "advances within feminist economics that take as their starting point the socially responsible, sensible and accountable subject in creating an economy and economic theories that fully acknowledge care for each other as well as the planet." The book was described by Winthrop Professor of Economics Alison Preston as "a timely reminder of the politics and economics underpinning what, how and by whom activities and outputs are valued. For those concerned with social justice and sustainable futures, this important and powerful book provides an invaluable and practical insight into issues that are in need of greater visibility." Economics commentator Maria Reinertsen compared the book to Thomas Piketty's Capital in the Twenty-First Century, arguing that "while Thomas Piketty's bestseller Capital in the Twenty-First Century barely tests the discipline's boundaries in its focus on the rich, Counting on Marilyn Waring challenges most limits of what economists should care about." According to Choice: Current Reviews for Academic Libraries, the book explores "a wide range of issues—including the fundamental meaning of economic growth and activity to consumption, health care, mortality, unpaid household work, mothering, education, nutrition, equality, and sustainability" and reveals "the breadth, depth, and substance that can grow from innovative ideas and critical analysis." Diane Elson argues that "despite many valiant efforts, women do not as yet really count in the conduct of economic policy. This book is an imaginative contribution to an ongoing struggle." In a review in Feminist Economics, Patricia E. Perkins calls the book "a joy to read and a revelation" and "a fitting culmination of [McKay's] lifelong work using economics to advance equity for women." The book is quoted in Melinda Gates' 2019 book The Moment of Lift: How Empowering Women Changes the World.

== Death and legacy ==
McKay died aged 50 on the morning of 5 March 2014, following a year-long battle with cancer.

First Minister of Scotland Alex Salmond praised McKay's "astonishing contribution as a feminist economist, both in arguing the case for women into work, and in being the principal author and arguer for many years for the transformation of childcare that will make that possible," while Salmond's eventual successor Nicola Sturgeon described her as "an inspirational economist and feminist." Pamela Gillies, principal and vice-chancellor of Glasgow Caledonian University, wrote: "In her far too early death, Scotland has lost an important force for good, the University has lost a greatly valued, committed and intellectually vibrant colleague and I have lost a dear friend. Professor Ailsa McKay will be missed by so many, but a scholarship founded in her name by the University she loved will inspire future generations of young, similarly feisty scholars to debate and to act for social change." Professor Michael Danson praised her "lifetime inspiring a better kind of economics in Scotland and across the world."

Margunn Bjørnholt and Marilyn Waring wrote that McKay "made a remarkable contribution to the field of feminist economics, as well as to Scottish society (...) through her combination of academic work and an active role in society. She was a founding member of the Scottish Women's Budget Group, which was founded around her kitchen table, later growing into an influential voice listened to by successive Scottish finance ministers and by others. (She) taught us through her life that economics and politics are not separate. She was incessantly campaigning for including gender into economic models and analyses, as well as for welfare reform, properly funded free universal childcare, and a citizen's basic income for all."

A January 2015 conference in honour of McKay attended by academics and politicians paid tribute to her work. Former First Minister Alex Salmond said that "my regret is this, that I didn't take forward Ailsa's policies in my first ministerial stage."

Ailsa McKay is highlighted as a leading intellectual figure in the campaign for Scottish independence in Alex Salmond's 2015 book The Dream Shall Never Die.

== Personal life ==
She was married to fellow economist Jim Campbell and had two children: Rory, born 1999, and Annie, born 2001.

== Ailsa McKay Lecture ==
The Ailsa McKay Lecture is the foremost honour in feminist economics, and has been delivered by:

- 2016: Nancy Folbre: "The Political Economy of Patriarchal Capitalism"
- 2017: Philippe Van Parijs: "Basic Income: A Radical Proposal for a Free Society and a Sane Economy"
- 2018: Stephanie Seguino: "The Contradictory Gender Effects of Globalisation"
- 2019: Rhonda Sharp: "Gender Responsive Budgeting in Challenging Times"
- 2021: James Heintz: "Confessions of a Rotten Kid—Reflections on Feminist Economics and the Future of the World"

== Selected bibliography ==
- Margunn Bjørnholt and Ailsa McKay (eds.), Counting on Marilyn Waring: New Advances in Feminist Economics, with a foreword by Julie A. Nelson, Demeter Press, 2014, ISBN 9781927335277
- Jobs for the Boys and the Girls: Promoting a Smart Successful Scotland Three Years On (with Jim Campbell, Morag Gillespie and Anne Meikle), Scottish Affairs, 66, 2009
- Why a citizens' basic income? A question of gender equality or gender bias, Work Employment & Society, 21 (2): 337–348, 2007
- From Gender Blind to Gender Focused: Re-Evaluating the Scottish Modern Apprenticeship Programme (with Jim Campbell and Emily Thomson), Scottish Affairs, 57, 2006
- How Modern is the Modern Apprenticeship (with Jim Campbell and Emily Thomson), Local Economy, 20 (3), 2005
- The Future of Social Security Policy: Women, Work and a Citizen's Basic Income, Routledge, 2005
- Rethinking Work and Income Maintenance Policy: Promoting Gender Equality Through a Citizens' Basic Income, Feminist Economics, 7 (1): 97–118, 2001
- Gender, Family, and Income Maintenance: A Feminist Case for Citizens Basic Income (with Jo Vanevery), Social Politics, 7 (2): 266–284, 2000

== See also ==
- Feminist economics
- List of feminist economists
- Universal basic income in the United Kingdom

== Literature ==
- Jim Campbell and Morag Gillespie (eds.), Feminist Economics and Public Policy: Reflections on the work and impact of Ailsa McKay, Routledge, 2016
