= Gunhild Vehusheia =

Norwegian lawyer and women's rights leader

President of the Norwegian Women's Lobby
- Incumbent
- Assumed office 2016
- Preceded by: Margunn Bjørnholt
- Succeeded by: Ragnhild Hennum

Personal details
- Born: 1975 (age 50–51) Grimstad
- Occupation: Lawyer

Gunhild Vehusheia (born 1975 in Grimstad) is a Norwegian lawyer and women's rights leader. She served as President of the Norwegian Women's Lobby, an umbrella organisation for the Norwegian women's movement with ten nationwide member organisations, from 2016 to 2017. She has formerly been executive director of the non-profit NGO Legal Advice for Women (JURK) and chairperson of the board of the Nordic Women's University.

Gunhild Vehusheia holds a cand.jur. degree from the University of Oslo from 2003, and was a lawyer at the law firm Salomon-Johansen from 2012 to 2015. She is currently a partner at the law firm Vive Advokater. She is known for representing children in court as well as for representing vulnerable groups such as victims of human trafficking and au pairs.

Vehusheia is a member of the executive board of the Norwegian Association for Women's Rights and is a board member of Legal Advice for Women. She also lectures on violence against women at Nord University.
