= Ragnhild Hennum =

Pro-Rector of University of Oslo
- In office 2014–2017
- Preceded by: Ruth Vatvedt Fjeld
- Succeeded by: Gro Bjørnerud Mo

President of the Norwegian Women's Lobby
- Incumbent
- Assumed office 2017
- Preceded by: Gunhild Vehusheia

Director of the Norwegian Centre for Human Rights
- Incumbent
- Assumed office 2018
- Preceded by: Inga Bostad

Personal details
- Born: 11 June 1967 (age 58)
- Profession: Law professor

Ragnhild Helene Hennum (born 11 June 1967) is a Norwegian jurist, academic administrator, and women's rights leader. Hennum was elected Rector at the University of Oslo for the period 2025-2029, and took office on 1 August 2025. She was Dean at the University of Oslo Faculty of Law from 2020-2025. She was Vice-Rector at the University of Oslo from 2009–2014 and Acting Pro-Rector from 2014–2017, and Director of the Norwegian Centre for Human Rights in 2018. Hennum's research fields are criminal law, criminal procedure and sociology of law, and she is a specialist on child sexual abuse, sexual violence in general and forced marriage. She is President of the Norwegian Women's Lobby, the umbrella organisation for the Norwegian women's movement.

== Career ==
Hennum earned her cand.jur. (LL.M.) degree at the University of Oslo in 1991 and her doctorate at the same university in 1999. She was employed by the University of Oslo Faculty of Law as a researcher, research fellow, postdoctoral fellow and assistant professor from 1992 to 2003. She became Associate Professor of Public Law in 2004 and Professor of Public Law in 2007, both at the Department of Public and International Law. In 2009 she was appointed by newly elected Rector Ole Petter Ottersen as Vice-Rector of the university, and continued in this office following Ottersen's reelection in 2013; in 2014 she became Pro-Rector, the deputy of the Rector and the university's second highest official. In 2018 she became Director of the Norwegian Centre for Human Rights.

She chaired the Royal Commission on Compensation for Victims of Violence (Voldsoffererstatningsutvalget), appointed by the King-in-Council in 2015, which presented Norwegian Official Report 2016: 9 Rettferdig og forutsigbar – voldsskadeerstatning and proposed a new statute on compensation for victims of violence. She was a member of the Royal Commission on Rape (Voldtektsutvalget) appointed in 2006 and the Royal Commission on the Use of Juries in Criminal Proceedings (Juryutvalget) appointed in 2010.

Hennum has been chair of the board of the University of Oslo's subsidiary company Unirand, a board member of Oslo Science Park and a deputy member of the board of the legal information service Lovdata. She is chair of the board of Oslo Women's Shelter. In 2017 she was elected President of the Norwegian Women's Lobby.
