= Centre for Development and the Environment =

Research centre at the University of Oslo

Coordinates: 59°56′51.6″N 10°43′53.5″E

- Senter for utvikling og miljø
- Abbreviation: SUM
- Type: Research institute
- Location: Oslo
- Parent organization: University of Oslo
- Website: www.sum.uio.no

Centre for Development and the Environment (Norwegian: Senter for utvikling og miljø, SUM) was a research centre at the University of Oslo, which dissolved in 2025. Much of its personnel and projects were absorbed into the Centre for Global Sustainability. The overarching goal of SUM, and its successor, is to conduct interdisciplinary research, teaching, and dissemination on development and environmental issues, with a particular focus on the interconnections between development and the environment. SUM was organized as a centre without faculty affiliation, directly under the university board. The centre was established on January 1, 1990, at the initiative of the Ministry of Culture and Science and the Norwegian Research Council for Science and the Humanities (NAVF). The initiative came in the wake of the active role Norway played in the World Commission on Environment and Development, Our Common Future, 1987, where the Brundtland Report was launched.

In the aftermath of the Brundtland Report, a research centre was established at each of the Norwegian core universities. SUM was established by merging three previously independent entities: the Council for Natural and Environmental Sciences (RNM), the Programme for Development Research in the Oslo Region (PUFO), and the Centre for International Development Studies (SIU). In 2000, the Programme for Research and Investigation for a Sustainable Society (ProSus) was incorporated into SUM. The legacy of the Brundtland Report is deeply rooted in SUM's mandate for interdisciplinary research and education on global development and environmental issues.

Today, approximately 74 employees are associated with SUM's successor, the Centre for Global Sustainability.

In 2024, it was announced that SUM would play a central role in the university's new interdisciplinary initiative on sustainability, the Centre for Global Sustainability. The new centre was established as a unit under the university board with the goal of strengthening and facilitating interdisciplinary research, education, and dissemination on sustainability. As of May 2025, the new centre is established virtually, and by the end of 2027, the centre will be physically established and move into what will become the Sustainability House on the Blindern campus.

== Research ==
SUM's vision is to promote groundbreaking, independent, and critical interdisciplinary research on sustainability, focusing on global and local challenges and crises related to health, welfare, nature, and society. The research at SUM seeks to be power-critical and globally oriented, challenge established views, and draw on interdisciplinary perspectives and approaches.

Initially, in addition to several smaller projects, SUM had three major interdisciplinary research programmes: ‘The Programme for Health, Population, Development’ (HEBUT), ‘Norwegian-Indonesian Rain Forest and Resource Management Project’ (NORINDRA), and ‘Environment and Development in Mali’. From 2003, the research was organized into three programmes that largely have influenced today's research groups at SUM. The programmes were: Local changes in developing countries; Culturally based attitudes towards the environment and development; Global governance for environment and development. In 2024, the centre has the following research groups:

- Sustainable consumption and energy equity

- Poverty reduction and the 2030 Agenda for Sustainable Development

- Culture, ethics, and sustainability

- Global Health Politics

- FoodSoil: Sustainable food systems

- Governance for sustainable development

- Rural futures

Additionally, the Research Centre for Socially Inclusive Energy Transition (INCLUDE) is a part of SUM (see below).

== Networks ==
For 28 years, from 1996 to 2024, SUM was the host institution for the Network for Asian Studies. The Network for Asian Studies was a national research network that promoted studies and research on Asia. From 2008 to 2020, SUM was the host institution for NORLANET, a similar network for researchers with Latin America as their research area.

In 2007, SUM initiated the establishment of the Arne Næss Professorship in Global Justice and Environment. The award was established with support from UiO and others and was led by Nina Witoszek until 2024. The professorship is annually awarded to an internationally recognised researcher, leader, or activist. James Lovelock was the first to be appointed as the Arne Næss Professor.

From 2009 to 2019, SUM had a framework agreement with the Norwegian Ministry of Foreign Affairs for operating the secretariat for The Trust Fund for Environmentally and Socially Sustainable Development (TFESSD) funded by Norway and Finland. Desmond McNeill, and later Dan Banik, were co-chairs of the reference group together with Kristalina Georgieva at the World Bank.

From 2011 to 2014, the current centre leader at SUM, Sidsel Roalkvam, led the reference group "The Lancet - University of Oslo Commission on Global Governance for Health," an international commission established on the initiative of UiO, Harvard University, and the journal The Lancet. Desmond McNeill was a member of the commission led by UiO's rector Ole Petter Ottersen. As a follow-up to the commission's work, SUM established ‘The Collective for the Political Determinants of Health,' an international and interdisciplinary group of researchers and practitioners.

In 2016, Professor at SUM Dan Banik established the Oslo SDG Initiative, a network and meeting point for education, research, and dissemination on the UN's 2030 Agenda and the Sustainable Development Goals. The initiative aims to bridge the gap between research and policy. Through the initiative, regular dialogue forums and seminars are organized to communicate research results and create shared platforms for governments, civil society, business, and academia to discuss issues related to the 2030 Agenda.

SUM is the host institution for INCLUDE, a social science Research Centre for Environmental-Friendly Energy (FME) funded by the Norwegian Research Council. INCLUDE was established in 2019, led by SUM's Professor Tanja Winter. The purpose of INCLUDE is to produce knowledge about how a socially just low-emission society can be realized through inclusive processes and close collaboration between research and the public, private, and voluntary sectors.

== Education ==
SUM offers university education at several levels. Until 2003, SUM offered three undergraduate courses (in Norwegian): “People and the Environment," "Environment and Development," and "Environmental Protection and Management." SUM also offered some graduate-level courses, and several master's students from various departments at UiO were associated with research groups at SUM through scholarship schemes. In 2003, SUM established its own master's programme, Culture, Environment, and Sustainability, in collaboration with the Faculty of Humanities at the University of Oslo. The master's programme is now called Development, Environment, and Cultural Change and is a two-year full-time study. Each year, the master's programme receives several hundred applicants, of which around 20 students are admitted. The student group consists of approximately half Norwegian and half international students.

In 2005, SUM received formal status as a Research School. The goal of SUM's Research School is to create a forum for PhD candidates that transcends disciplinary boundaries, challenges dominant values and perspectives, and fosters close collaboration with other departments at UiO and abroad. In addition to regular seminars for PhD students, the Research School organizes short, intensive PhD courses on a wide range of topics.

In 2015, UiO launched its first international MOOC (massive open online course) in collaboration with Stanford University, titled "What Works: Promising Practices in International Development," led by Dan Banik.

As part of the International Summer School, SUM offered the course "Energy Planning and Sustainable Development" until 2019.

In 2022, SUM organized a continuing education course in local sustainable transition management, the first of its kind at the University of Oslo. The course is aimed at professionals and leaders in the public, private, and voluntary sectors who have, or wish to take, responsibility for local transition projects or other development work aimed at sustainable transformation.

In 2023, the University of Oslo launched a sustainability certificate at the bachelor's level, which SUM leads and is mainly responsible for organizing and coordinating. The certificate provides students with an interdisciplinary understanding of challenges related to sustainability and just and sustainable change.

== Research communication and dissemination ==
In line with its mandate, SUM places great emphasis on dissemination. SUM's researchers communicate their work through publication of books and articles in international journals, as well as in debates, panel discussions, presentations, opinion pieces, and events for the broader public.

=== The leaders of SUM's research groups in public discourse ===
Mariel Aguilar-Støen, professor and social geographer at SUM, has a public voice on issues related to meat production, the emergence of infectious diseases and pandemic viruses, Latin America in general, and Guatemala in particular. She is currently in charge of the Research School at SUM.

Professor and political scientist Dan Banik actively participates in public discourse on development, poverty reduction, and the UN's sustainable development goals. Among other things, Dan Banik has his own podcast, "In Pursuit of Development," where he invites researchers, politicians, and activists to discuss and converse on current topics.

Benedicte Bull, professor and political scientist, is particularly prominent in the public sphere. She frequently appears as a guest and expert commentator on television and radio, speaking about current issues in Latin American politics, economics, and development, with a particular focus on Venezuela.

Researcher Arve Hansen communicates research on sustainable consumption, food and meat consumption, and social conditions and development in Asia. He regularly writes opinion pieces in newspapers and is a guest on radio programmes.

Professor and cultural historian Karen Victoria Lykke contributes to public discussions about meat, agriculture, and Norwegian food production. She regularly gives lectures and writes on these subjects.

Katerini Storeng, medical anthropologist and professor at SUM, is active in research dissemination. She regularly participates in panel discussions, conferences, and debates where global health policy issues are discussed.

Tanja Winther, social anthropologist, electrical engineer, and professor at SUM, is an important voice on issues concerning the social and cultural aspects of energy. She communicates research through op-eds, YouTube, and radio participation and is an active lecturer and panelist.

== Directors ==
- Nils Christian Stenseth (1990–1992)

- Desmond McNeill (1992–2001)

- Bente Herstad (2001–2007)

- Kristi Anne Stølen (2007–2017)

- Sidsel Roalkvam (2017 - )
