= Marilyn Waring =

New Zealand politician and academic

Dame Marilyn Waring DNZM
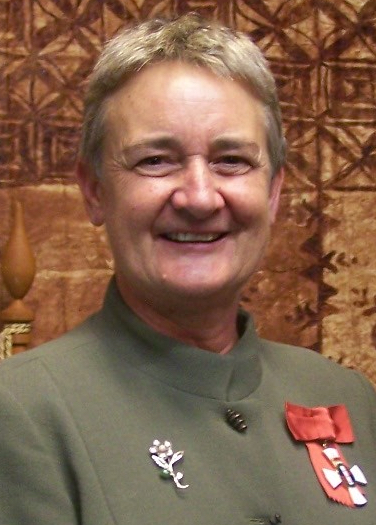
- Waring in 2008

Member of the New Zealand Parliament for Raglan
- In office 29 November 1975 – 25 November 1978
- Preceded by: Douglas Carter
- Succeeded by: Electorate abolished

Member of the New Zealand Parliament for Waipa
- In office 25 November 1978 – 14 July 1984
- Preceded by: Electorate re-established
- Succeeded by: Katherine O'Regan

Chair of the Public Expenditure Committee
- In office 1978–1984

Board member of the Reserve Bank of New Zealand
- In office 2005–2009

Personal details
- Born: 7 October 1952 (age 74) Ngāruawāhia, New Zealand
- Party: National (1974–1984)
- Committees: Public Expenditure Committee (chair); Senior government member of the Foreign Affairs Committee; Disarmament and Arms Control Committee
- Website: www.marilynwaring.com

Dame Marilyn Joy Waring DNZM (born 7 October 1952) is a New Zealand public policy scholar, international development consultant, former politician, environmentalist, feminist and a principal founder of feminist economics.

In 1975, aged 23, she became New Zealand's youngest member of parliament for the centre-right New Zealand National Party. As a member of parliament she chaired the Public Expenditure Committee. Her support of the opposition Labour Party's proposed nuclear-free New Zealand policy was instrumental in precipitating the 1984 New Zealand general election, and she left parliament in 1984.

On leaving parliament she moved into academia; she is best known for her 1988 book If Women Counted, and she obtained a D.Phil in politics in 1989. Through her research and writing she is known as the principal founder of the discipline of feminist economics. Since 2006, Waring has been a professor of public policy at the Institute of Public Policy at AUT, focusing on governance and public policy, political economy, gender analysis, and human rights. She has taken part in international aid work and served as a consultant to UNDP and other international organisations.

She has outspokenly criticised the concept of gross domestic product (GDP), the economic measure that became a foundation of the United Nations System of National Accounts (UNSNA) following World War II. She criticises a system which "counts oil spills and wars as contributors to economic growth, while child-rearing and housekeeping are deemed valueless". Her work has influenced academics, government accounting in a number of countries, and United Nations policies. Waring has had a long-time involvement with the Association for Women's Rights in Development, a progressive feminist organisation that advocates inclusive feminism, and served on its board until 2012. In 2021 she was appointed by the World Health Organization as a member of the WHO Council on the Economics of Health For All.

Waring's work has been central to critiques of national income accounting, specifically in the exclusion of unpaid labour from measures such as gross domestic product. In her work, If Women Counted, she argues that current economic systems assign value primarily through market transactions, therefore excluding essential forms of labour such as childcare, elder care, and household work. Waring states that this exclusion misrepresents economic priorities by recognising activities like military expenses, while ignoring the labour that is required for proper social reproduction. She further emphasises that unpaid work, disproportionately performed by women, supports the functioning of the formal economy. Her analysis has contributed to the development of alternative accounting frameworks, including time use surveys and satellite accounts, which aim to better explain the economic significance of labour that is not on the current market.

== Early life ==
Marilyn Waring grew up at Taupiri, where her parents owned a butchery. Her great-grandfather Harry (Arthur Henry) Waring had emigrated to New Zealand from Hopesay in Herefordshire, England, in 1881, and established the family butchery business at Taupiri. In 1927 Harry Waring stood unsuccessfully for election to parliament in the Raglan seat for the Reform Party, the forerunner of the National Party. Waring was a talented soprano in her youth, and her parents had hoped that she would become a classical singer. In 1973, Waring received an Honours BA in political science and international politics from Victoria University of Wellington.

== Career ==
=== Political career ===
New Zealand Parliament
Years	Term	Electorate	Party
1975–1978	38th	Raglan	National
1978–1981	39th	Waipa	National
1981–1984	40th	Waipa	National

Waring joined the National Party while still a student at Victoria University. She joined because she supported National MP Venn Young, who introduced a private member's bill into parliament for homosexual law reform; this was opposed by Norman Kirk, the Labour Party Prime Minister. She quickly entered the Opposition Research Unit as a part-time advisor under George Gair, the Shadow Minister of Housing.

The 1972 to 1975 National Opposition had not had a single female member in its caucus. Exacerbated due to 1975 being International Women's Year, it was to deep embarrassment among the National Party's established figures that no women had been selected for any seats in the upcoming election. At age 22, Waring expressed some passing interest to Gair in standing for the party in the seat of Raglan, a very safe National seat that contained her hometown of Huntly. Gair anxiously called former Prime Minister Keith Holyoake to tell him about Waring's interest and origins in the area itself. An overjoyed Holyoake personally arrived within the hour to Parliament House, and offered her the selection without even formally introducing himself. The two thereafter became very close, to the extent that on one occasion she kissed Holyoake on the lips in front of cameras. She is thought to have helped soften Holyoake's ambivalent views on LGBT rights; after she was involuntarily outed by the New Zealand Truth in 1978, Holyoake worked with Prime Minister Robert Muldoon to quickly downplay the tabloid reports and to protect their friend.

Waring campaigned for selection by making house calls on party delegates, starting in her home town of Huntly, borrowing her mother's car (and some of her clothes). She mentioned her opposition to sporting ties with South Africa. 26 of the 130 voting delegates were women; including Katherine O'Regan who became her electoral agent for eight years. The other candidates were men: a County Council chair, a Meat and Wool Section chair of Federated Farmers, a National Party Divisional councillor and a popular local farmer who had stood as an independent in the 1972 election. The selection meeting was held at Ngaruawahia High School assembly hall (she went there her first two years of secondary school). She was the last candidate to speak; each was given two sealed envelopes with the same subject to speak on. Party president George Chapman's subject was agricultural incomes – "not her strong suit" – and Party leader Robert Muldoon's was housing policy; a patsy question as he knew she was working on housing policy with Gair (as she pointed out to the meeting).

When her selection was announced Waring thought there had been "a dreadful mistake" but there was a round of stand-up cheering and Jim Bolger from the neighbouring King Country electorate raced up and embraced her on stage. She was later told by a scrutineer that she was ahead from the first ballot, and slowly climbed to over 50%. Her selection reflected her "obvious ability and ... well-articulated convictions", but was helped because the two best-known local candidates disliked each other, and when one was eliminated his support went to Waring to prevent the selection of the other. One family block voted for her because another candidate had sold them a horse with a saddle sore concealed by a blanket.

Muldoon said at the subsequent party caucus meeting in Wellington how pleased he was that she made it: "We are going to win. I wanted a woman and I will help all I can". Holyoake agreed with Muldoon that "I haven't seen anything like it in 40 years." Aged 23, she was the youngest member of parliament at the time of her election.

Waring and Colleen Dewe (elected to the Lyttelton "swing" seat then held by Labour) were the fourteenth and fifteenth women elected as Members of Parliament in New Zealand. Waring was one of only two women in the government caucus and one of only four women elected in 1975. After the 1978 election she was the sole female government MP until Ruth Richardson was elected in 1981. Both Waring and Richardson were members of the Women's Electoral Lobby.

She fell out with Prime Minister Robert Muldoon almost immediately, and there were several episodes of conflict, although they also shared views on some issues such as welfare payments to single mothers, where Muldoon was a believer in the welfare state.

During her period in Parliament, she served as Chair of the Public Expenditure Committee, Senior Government Member of the Foreign Affairs Committee, and on the Disarmament and Arms Control Committee. The appointment to the Public Expenditure Committee after the 1978 election was a considerable achievement for a member of only three years' standing. According to Barry Gustafson,

Waring recalled that she 'just fell off my chair' when Muldoon, without any prior consultation, announced at caucus that she would be chairperson of the very influential Public Expenditure Committee. This was a major position for an MP of only three years' experience and even more so in light of Waring's youth and controversial first term. Muldoon, however, knew that Waring had similar views and values on the economy to his own and that she had the intellectual capacity and drive to cope with complex investigation and analysis. He was also well aware that she would not be intimidated by ministers or senior officials.

She also served on the Select Committee for Violent Offending, taking a particular interest in the Aroha Trust, formed by Black Power women. As a Member of Parliament, she was also the New Zealand Observer at the United Nations Commission on the Status of Women, and chaired the New Zealand Delegation to the OECD Conference on the Role of Women in the Economy in 1978.

The Raglan electorate was abolished in 1978: her home town of Huntly and Ngaruawahia were now in the Rangiriri electorate and Raglan was in the Waikato electorate. Waring moved to the Waipa electorate, one of the safest National seats in the country, which included the wealthy rural town of Cambridge and parts of the King Country.

Waring had come especially to disagree with the National Party policy over the issue of a nuclear-free New Zealand and, on 14 June 1984, she informed the leadership that she would vote independently on nuclear issues, disarmament issues, and rape but would continue to support the Government on confidence. Since the National Party had only a one-seat majority, the government would be likely (though not certain) to lose on an issue Muldoon regarded as one of national security.

That evening Muldoon decided to call a snap election to be held on 14 July (a general election was due at the end of the year). The election was a disaster for the National Party. Waring told Muldoon's biographer that she had deliberately sought to provoke Muldoon into this action. The nuclear-free New Zealand legislation was subsequently enacted by the new Labour government. In her autobiography, The Political Years, she described laughing as Muldoon berated her in a parliamentary office, and recounted eating an apple to taunt him as Muldoon drank and grew enraged.

Jim Traue of the Alexander Turnbull Library asked if they could archive her papers; they did not normally archive MPs' papers (only Ministers') "but her collection would be different"; there were close to 400 cartons.

=== Academic work ===
In 1984 Waring left politics and returned to academia, where her research has focused on feminist economics, well-being, human rights and on economic factors that influence legislation and aid.

In 1988 she published If Women Counted (originally published with an introduction by Gloria Steinem). The book has also been published as Counting for Nothing, but remains most widely known under the first title. It criticises the use of GDP as a surrogate for "progress," and argues that lacking valuation of women and nature drive decisions in globalisation that have unintended but terrible consequences for the world. According to Julie A. Nelson,

"Marilyn Waring's work woke people up. She showed exactly how the unpaid work traditionally done by women has been made invisible within national accounting systems, and the damage this causes. Her book [...] encouraged and influenced a wide range of work on ways, both numerical and otherwise, of valuing, preserving, and rewarding the work of care that sustains our lives. By pointing to a similar neglect of the natural environment, she also issued a wake-up call to issues of ecological sustainability that have only grown more pressing over time. In recent decades, the field of feminist economics has broadened and widened to encompass these topics and more."

A highly influential thinker and practitioner, her work has influenced both academia and United Nations policies. If Women Counted "persuaded the United Nations to redefine gross domestic product, inspired new accounting methods in dozens of countries and became the founding document of the discipline of feminist economics." Waring has continued to challenge governments to adopt her work even though some countries such as Scotland, New Zealand, Australia, Canada and South Korea have recognised unpaid work and improved data collection and statistics to inform policy making.

In 1989 Waring gained a D.Phil. in politics from the University of Waikato with a thesis on the United Nations System of National Accounts, and in 1990 a University of Waikato Research Council grant to continue work on "female human rights."

Between 1991 and 1994, Waring served as Senior Lecturer in Public Policy and the Politics of Human Rights with the Department of Politics at the University of Waikato, New Zealand.

In May 2006, Waring was appointed Professor of Public Policy at the Institute for Public Policy (IPP) at AUT. Her research focuses on governance and public policy, political economy, gender analysis, and human rights. In 2010 Waring and Grant Gillon supervised the master's thesis of former minister George Gair. Other notable students of Waring include Sue Bradford, Trish Bradbury, Shirley Jülich and Karanina Sumeo.

She was one of 16 prominent intellectuals invited to contribute to a French publication on human rights around the globe in 2007, along with Ken Loach, Maude Barlow, Walden Bello and Susan George.

In 2014, the anthology Counting on Marilyn Waring: New Advances in Feminist Economics, edited by Margunn Bjørnholt and Ailsa McKay, was published. According to Choice: Current Reviews for Academic Libraries, the book explores "a wide range of issues—including the fundamental meaning of economic growth and activity to consumption, health care, mortality, unpaid household work, mothering, education, nutrition, equality, and sustainability" and reveals "the breadth, depth, and substance that can grow from innovative ideas and critical analysis." Diane Elson argues that "despite many valiant efforts, women do not as yet really count in the conduct of economic policy. This book is an imaginative contribution to an ongoing struggle."

According to Wired,

"Marilyn Waring is an extremely clear thinker about the disastrous consequences of using measures such as GDP as a surrogate for "progress" or "wellbeing" in a country. She has also analysed how economics as it is currently practised as a "science" is radically defective and that it drives decisions in globalisation that have unintended but terrible consequences for the world. We must realise that we can't tackle the problems in health care, environmental issues, food security, democracy and women's rights in isolation; they must be seen as a set of interrelated issues, and anyone who wants to make a difference in the human condition must look at all of these factors."

=== International aid work ===
Waring has led the Gender and Governance team for the Regional Assistance Mission to Solomon Islands. She also led UNDP's largest project in the Asia Pacific for the Gender and Economic Policy Management Initiative. She led the Commonwealth Secretariat teams on Unpaid Work and HIV/Aids and on Social Protection. She has also served as a technical expert on gender and poverty for both UNDP and AUSAid.

=== Other ===
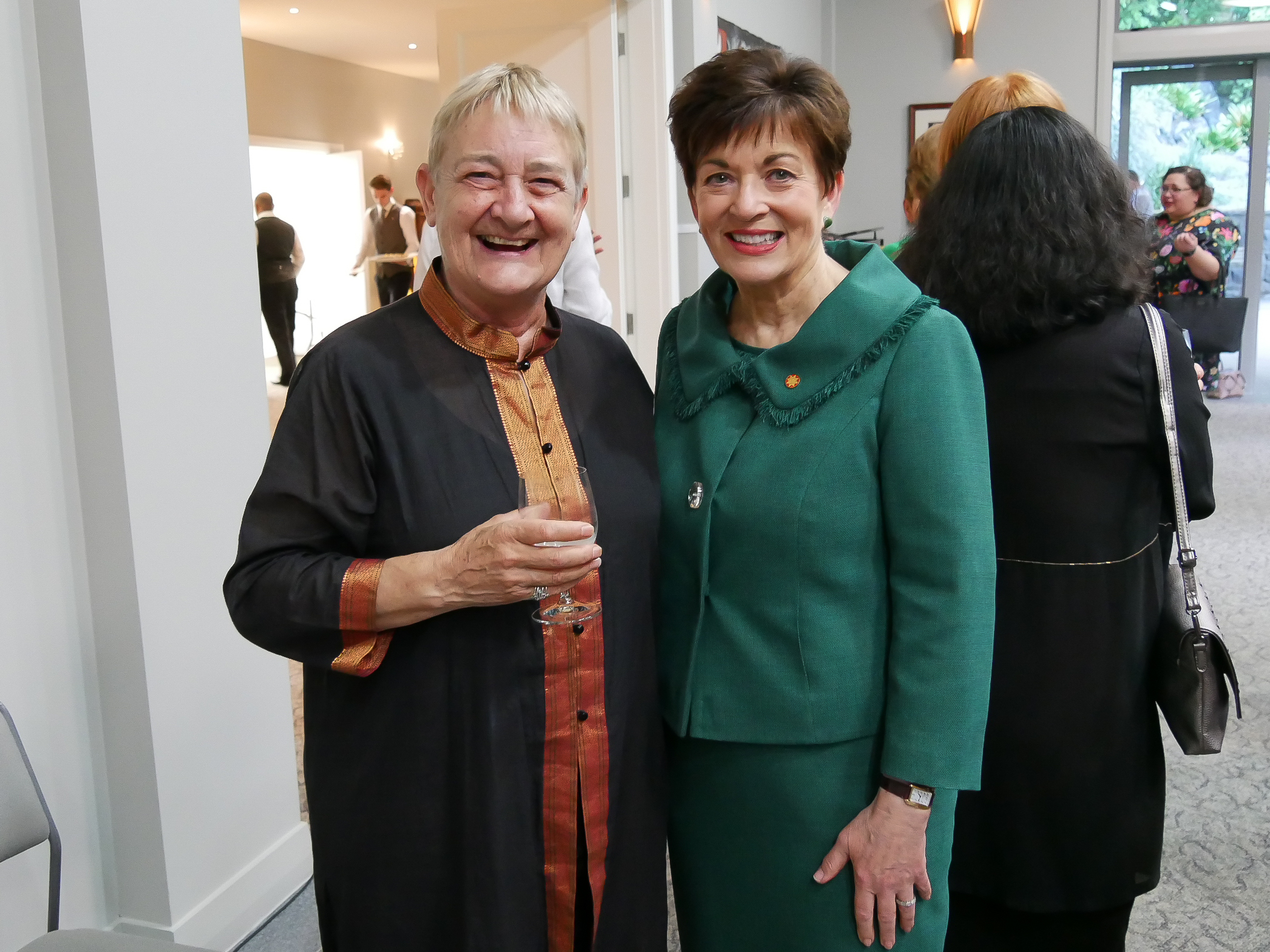
Waring with Governor-General Dame Patsy Reddy, November 2020

She and Ngahuia Te Awekotuku contributed the piece "Foreigners in our own land" to the 1984 anthology Sisterhood Is Global: The International Women's Movement Anthology, edited by Robin Morgan.

Waring speaks publicly on gay and lesbian rights, most recently in support of same-sex marriages. The New Zealand Truth tabloid newspaper "outed" her as a lesbian in 1976. She refused to comment at the time and the Prime Minister, Robert Muldoon, moved swiftly to minimise publicity and protect her; the general attitude among politicians being that it was a private matter. Muldoon advised her "The way to do this is not to say anything at all to anyone, do you understand? You don't say anything, I don't say anything, the Party doesn't say anything – and there's no story if we don't talk. In the end, it will just go away. As for your future, that will be between you and your electorate." He refused to say anything to journalists; her electorate chairman and electorate Executive Committee told her she had their total support. An initial injunction against publishing the story arranged by Jim McLay had been overturned.

Waring's strong pro-choice identification and vocal feminism overshadowed her lesbianism. Since she left Parliament in 1984, Waring has more openly acknowledged her sexual orientation.

=== 'People's select committee' on pay equity ===
In May 2025 Waring set up a "people's select committee" to examine pay equity changes. The National government had passed changes to the Equal Pay Act under urgency, without select committee scrutiny, on 6 May. The committee was composed of ten ex-MPs with a collective 100 years' of select committee experience:

- Marilyn Waring, Jackie Blue, Jo Hayes, Belinda Vernon (former National MPs)
- Ria Bond (former New Zealand First MP)
- Lianne Dalziel, Steve Chadwick, Nanaia Mahuta, Lynne Pillay (former Labour MPs)
- Sue Bradford (former Green MP)

== Appointments and affiliations ==
Waring was a member of the Board of the Reserve Bank of New Zealand from 2005 to 2009. She has been a consultant for, and a board member of, international organisations such as the Commonwealth Secretariat, the Secretariat of the Pacific Community (SPC), United Nations Development Programme, Regional Assistance Mission to Solomon Islands (RAMSI), the International Development Research Centre (Ottawa, Canada) and the Association for Women's Rights in Development.

== Farming ==
Since 1984 and in between her academic and activist engagements, Waring farmed angora goats and dry stock, latterly on her hill-farm north of Auckland. Her experiences of life on the farm, international questions, New Zealand politics, feminist issues, and women of influence, were recorded In the Lifetime of a Goat: Writings 1984–2000; her popular Listener columns Letters to My Sisters from 1984 to 1989, form the basis. She organised her farm for maximum simplicity and self-sufficiency. Waring gave up goat farming in 2003.

== Awards and recognition ==
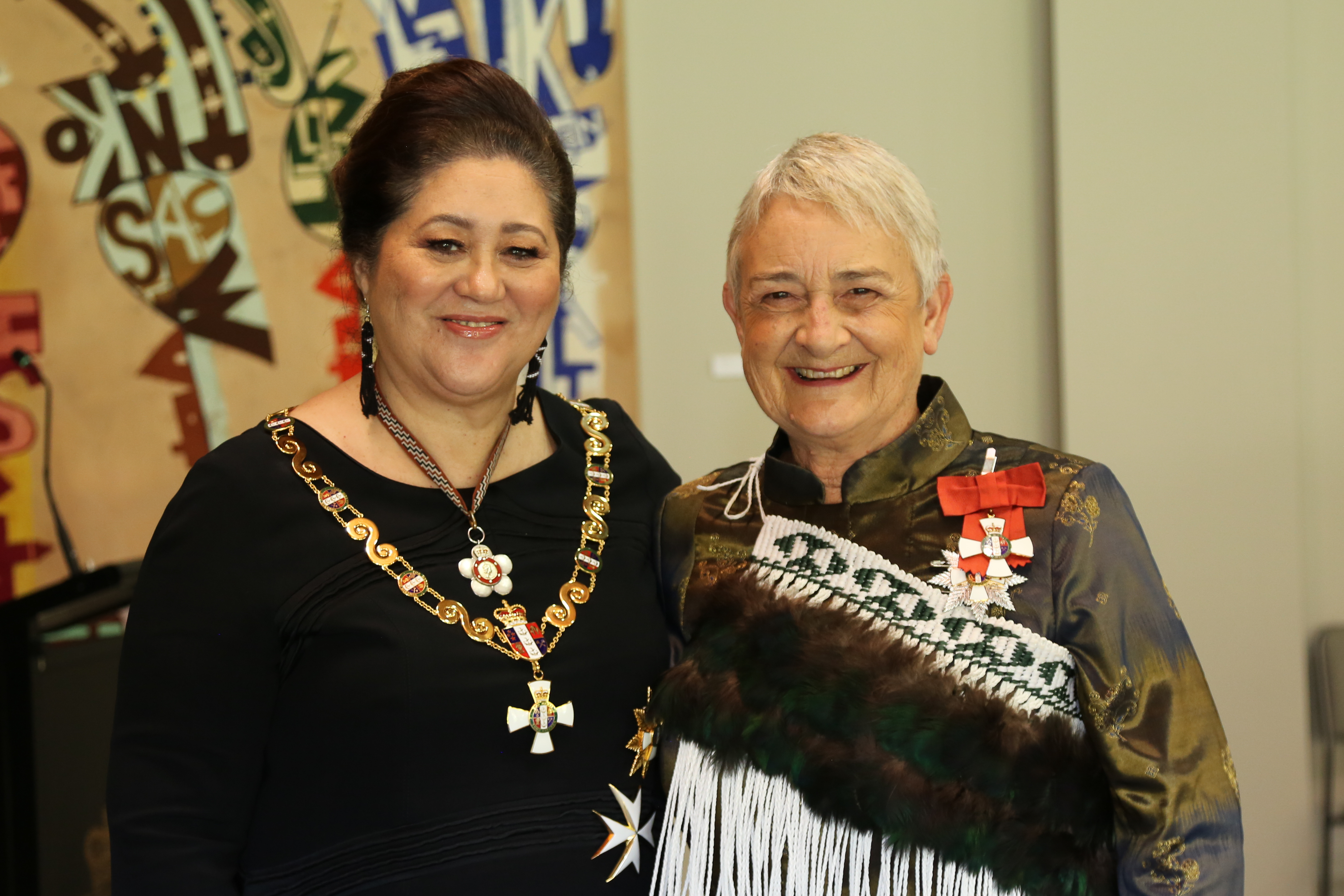
Waring (right), after her investiture as a Dame Companion of the New Zealand Order of Merit by the governor-general, Dame Cindy Kiro, at Government House, Auckland, on 24 May 2022

- In the 2020 New Year Honours, Waring was appointed a Dame Companion of the New Zealand Order of Merit, for services to women and economics.
- 2019 BBC 100 Women
- 2018 Deloitte Top 200 Award for Visionary Leader
- 2014 New Zealand Institute of Economic Research (NZIER) Economics Award – to recognise and reward specific contributions in the fields of applied economics, economic dissemination, and economic policymaking affecting New Zealand
- 2013 Inaugural Westpac/Fairfax New Zealand Women of Influence Awards – winner of the Science and Innovation category
- 2013 Amnesty International New Zealand's Human Rights Defender Award
- 2011 Doctor of Letters (D.Litt.) honoris causa, Glasgow Caledonian University, for her "outstanding international contribution towards the understanding of feminism and female human rights"
- 2008 Companion of the New Zealand Order of Merit, for her "services to women and economics"
- 2000 The College of Nurses (Aotearoa) announce an annual award for graduate study called the Marilyn Waring Scholarship
- 1995 Hiroshima Day: Special Award of NZ Foundation for Peace Studies for Peacework
- 1993 Suffrage Centenary Medal
- 1990 Commemorative Medal
- 1977 Queen Elizabeth II Silver Jubilee Medal

Waring's work was the subject of a 1995 film by Oscar-winning director Terre Nash, produced by the National Film Board of Canada, titled Who's Counting? Marilyn Waring on Sex, Lies and Global Economics. In 2012, she was included on the Wired Magazine Smart List of "50 people who will change the world." An anthology named Counting on Marilyn Waring: New Advances in Feminist Economics was published in 2014, edited by Margunn Bjørnholt and Ailsa McKay and with contributions of a diverse group of scholars on advances made in the field since the publication of If Women Counted.

Waring's work is discussed in Melinda Gates' 2019 book The Moment of Lift: How Empowering Women Changes the World.

== Selected works ==
- Waring, Marilyn. Women, Politics, and Power: Essays, Unwin Paperbacks-Port Nicholson Press (1984). Issues on women in Parliament, apartheid and New Zealand sport, Nuclear Free New Zealand. ISBN 0-86861-562-5
- Waring, Marilyn. If Women Counted: A New Feminist Economics, Harper & Row (1988), republished by Macmillan, Allen & Unwin and University of Toronto Press several times under its original title and as Counting for Nothing
- Waring, Marilyn. Three Masquerades: Essays on Equality, Work and Hu(man) Rights, Auckland: Auckland University Press with Bridget Williams Books (1996) ISBN 0-8020-8076-6. Three Masquerades includes references to Waring's years in Parliament, which she describes as "an experience of counterfeit equality". It also looks at her experiences with farming and with the development field, where she was "daily confronted with the travesty of excluding women's unpaid work from the policy-making process".
- Waring, Marilyn. In the Lifetime of a Goat: Writings 1984–2000, Bridget Williams Books (April 2004) ISBN 1-877242-09-8
- Waring, Marilyn. Managing Mayhem : Work Life Balance in New Zealand, Dunmore Publishing (2007). ISBN 9781877399282
- Waring, Marilyn. 1 Way 2 C the World: Writings 1984–2006, University of Toronto Press (2011)
- Anit N Mukherjee, Marilyn Waring, Meena Shivdas, Robert Carr. Who Cares?: The Economics of Dignity, Commonwealth Secretariat (2011). ISBN 978-1-84929-019-7
- Waring, Marilyn & Kearins, Kate. Thesis Survivor Stories, Exisle Publishing (2011). Practical Advice on Getting Through Your PhD or Masters Thesis. ISBN 978-0-9582997-2-5
- Anit N Mukherjee, Elizabeth Reid, Marilyn Waring, Meena Shivdas. Anticipatory Social Protection: Claiming dignity and rights, Commonwealth Secretariat (2013). ISBN 978-1-84929-095-1
- Waring, Marilyn. Still Counting: Wellbeing, Women's Work and Policy-making. Bridget Williams Books (2019) ISBN 9781988545530
- Waring, Marilyn. Marilyn Waring: the Political Years. Bridget Williams Books (2019). ISBN 978-1-98854-593-6

== Filmography ==
- Who's Counting? Marilyn Waring on Sex, Lies and Global Economics (1995). Directed by Terre Nash and produced by the National Film Board of Canada. The film can be viewed at nfb.ca.

== Audio ==
- Marilyn Waring on TUC Radio. This is an audio version of "Who's Counting?" video (also called "Counting for Nothing"). Direct link to audio is here.

== Discography ==
- "Working Class Hero' (John Lennon cover) b/w Couldn't Get It Right (Climax Blues Band cover) (1980).

== See also ==
- Eco-feminism
- Triple bottom line
- Feminist economics
- List of feminist economists
- Gay rights in New Zealand
- Australian and New Zealand Association for Feminist Economics (ANZAFFE)

New Zealand Parliament
Preceded by Douglas Carter	Member of Parliament for Raglan; 1975–1978	Vacant Constituency abolished, recreated in 1984 Title next held by Simon Upton
Vacant Constituency recreated after abolition in 1969 Title last held by Sir Leslie Munro	Member of Parliament for Waipa; 1978–1984	Succeeded by Katherine O'Regan
Preceded by	Chair of the Public Expenditure Committee; 1978–1984	Succeeded by
