= Geir Ellingsrud =

Norwegian mathematician

Geir Ellingsrud (born 29 November 1948) is a Norwegian professor emeritus of mathematics at the University of Oslo, where he specialises in algebra and algebraic geometry.

He took the cand.real. degree at the University of Oslo in 1973, and the doctorate at Stockholm University in 1982. He was a lecturer at Stockholm University from 1982 to 1984, associate professor at the University of Oslo from 1984 to 1989, professor at the University of Bergen from 1989 to 1993 and at the University of Oslo since 1993. He has been a visiting scholar in Nice, Paris, Bonn and Chicago. He has edited the journals Acta Mathematica and Normat.

In 2005 Ellingsrud was elected to be rector of the University of Oslo for the period 2006-2009. His team also consisted of Inga Bostad and Haakon Breien Benestad. He did not seek reelection to a second term, and was succeeded by Ole Petter Ottersen.

Academic offices
Preceded by Arild Underdal	Rectors of the University of Oslo; 2006–2009	Succeeded by Ole Petter Ottersen
