= The Strasbourg Conference =

The Strasbourg Conference is a forum on freedom of religion and belief. It is dedicated to studying religion-related cases before international human rights institutions. The forum aims to provide a resource to scholars and decision-makers and promotes continuing dialogue. It is based in Strasbourg, France.

The forum is sponsored by human rights institutions and universities such as the Norwegian Centre for Human Rights, the Faculty of Law of the University of Bristol, the Department of Ecclesiastical Law at Complutense University, Madrid, the International Institute of Human Rights at Strasbourg, and the International Center for Law and Religion Studies at Brigham Young University in the United States.
