= Margunn Bjørnholt =

Norwegian sociologist and economist (born 1958)

Professor Margunn Bjørnholt
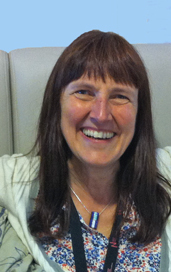
- Margunn Bjørnholt in 2014
- Born: 9 October 1958 (age 67); Bø i Telemark, Norway
- Awards: Article of the Year (2021); Rights Prize (2023)
- Scientific career
- Fields: Sociology, economics
- Workplaces: Norwegian Centre for Violence and Traumatic Stress Studies, University of Oslo, University of Bergen
- Website: www.margunnbjornholt.no

Margunn Bjørnholt (born 9 October 1958 in Bø i Telemark) is a Norwegian sociologist and economist. She is a research professor at the Norwegian Centre for Violence and Traumatic Stress Studies (NKVTS) and a professor of sociology at the University of Bergen. Her research has focused on financial institutions, management and working life and later on gender equality, migration and violence. She has also worked as a consultant, a civil servant, served as an expert to the European Commission and been president of the Norwegian Association for Women's Rights.

== Background and career ==
She earned an M.Sc. in European economic studies from the College of Europe (1982), a mag.art. in economic sociology from the University of Oslo (1995), with a dissertation on microfinance, ethical and interest-free banking, and a PhD in gender studies from Örebro University (2014), with the dissertation Modern Men.

In the 1980s she was responsible for the program on women's entrepreneurship at the Regional Development Fund. She then worked at the National Institute of Technology and as a partner in a consultancy, promoting women's entrepreneurship and leadership. In the 1990s, she was involved in green economy both as an academic and as a practitioner, and she chaired JAK Norway (1991–92), an attempt to establish an interest-free ethical bank in collaboration with JAK Members Bank.

From 1993 she was affiliated with the Project for an Alternative Future (Centre for Development and the Environment, University of Oslo), where she researched ethical financial institutions, money, and monetary systems. She was then a researcher at the Work Research Institute and the University of Oslo's Department of Sociology and Human Geography. In 2015 she became a research professor at the Norwegian Centre for Violence and Traumatic Stress Studies (NKVTS), also at the University of Oslo. In 2021 she also became a professor of sociology at the University of Bergen.

She has served as an independent expert on gender equality to the European Commission, and has been a visiting scholar at Martha Albertson Fineman's Feminism and Legal Theory Project at Emory Law, the GEXcel Center of Gender Excellence and the Centre for Law and Social Justice at the University of Leeds. She was a member of the research group Rights, Individuals, Culture and Society at the University of Oslo Faculty of Law and is a member of the expert committee of Rethinking Economics in Norway. She is a global affiliate of Fineman's research group, the Vulnerability and the Human Condition Initiative at Emory Law, and of the WiSE Centre for Economic Justice at the Glasgow School for Business and Society. She has taught students in sociology and psychology at the University of Oslo, and students in peace and conflict studies, governance, criminology, health policy and family therapy at other universities.

== Research ==
Most of her work lies within sociology, but she has also worked on economic, legal and political science topics. The focus of her research has changed over time from financial institutions, management, and working life, to gender equality, migration, and violence. She has published over 50 peer-reviewed papers, three books, and several reports.

Her research in the 1990s focused on ethical banking, money and monetary systems. From the late 1990s she researched management and organisational change in the public sector, with a focus on organisational and spatial flexibility. Her research on working life led her to work–family issues and men's studies, with a focus on men's changing work-family practices and gender relations. She has also researched the cultural adaptations and transnational practices of Polish migrants to Norway, and has been involved in several projects in Central and Eastern Europe.

In 2015 she was commissioned by the Ministry of Justice and Public Security to establish a research program on the gendered dimensions of violence at NKVTS, and she has led several projects on intimate partner violence, sexual violence, violence against refugees and migrants, and violence and abuse in Indigenous Sámi communities and immigrant communities. From 2019 she headed an EU-funded project on violence against women migrants and refugees, which formed the basis of policy recommendations for reducing women's vulnerability to sexual and gender-based violence, in collaboration with Jane Freedman (CNRS) and others. Her books on violence are Vold i nære relasjoner (Universitetsforlaget, 2019) and Men, Masculinities and Intimate Partner Violence (Routledge, 2021).

She has also worked on theories of justice and feminist economics, and she has collaborated with the American legal theorist Martha Albertson Fineman and the feminist economist Marilyn Waring for several years. In 2014 she co-edited a book on recent advances in feminist economics with Scottish economist Ailsa McKay. She has also published works on qualitative and quantitative research methods.

== Civic and political activities ==
In the early 1980s she was a journalist for the feminist radio station radiOrakel. She was president of the Norwegian Association for Women's Rights (2013–2016), President of the Norwegian Women's Lobby (2014–2016) and a board member of the International Alliance of Women (2013–2017). She was appointed by the Norwegian government as a member of the Norwegian delegation to the 59th and 60th sessions of the UN Commission on the Status of Women (CSW). She was a candidate for the Green Party in the 2015 elections.

== Honours ==
- Article of the Year – Scandinavian University Press Academic Journal Prize (2021).
- Rights Prize (2023)
