= Jens Erik Fenstad =

Norwegian mathematician (1935–2020)

- Born: 15 April 1935; Trondheim, Norway
- Died: 13 April 2020 (aged 84); Bærum, Norway
- Education: University of Oslo
- Known for: Mathematical logic
- Scientific career
- Fields: Mathematician
- Workplaces: University of Oslo

Vice Rector of the University of Oslo
- In office 1989–1993
- Preceded by: Bjørn Pedersen
- Succeeded by: Arild Underdal

President of the DLMPST/IUHPST
- In office 1991–1995
- Preceded by: Laurence Jonathan Cohen
- Succeeded by: Wesley Salmon

Jens Erik Fenstad (15 April 1935 – 13 April 2020) was a Norwegian mathematician.

== Biography ==
Fenstad graduated as mag.scient. from the University of Oslo in 1959, and worked as a research fellow there and at UC Berkeley. He was a professor at the University of Oslo from 1968 to 2003, except for the years 1989 to 1993, when he was vice rector (prorektor). In 1988, he received the Sierpiński Medal. On 29 May 1998 Fensted received an honorary doctorate from the Faculty of Science and Technology at Uppsala University, Sweden. He served in the Executive Committee of the Division for Logic, Methodology and Philosophy of Science of the International Union of History and Philosophy of Science as Treasurer from 1975 to 1983 and as President from 1991 to 1995.

He chaired the Norwegian Mathematical Society and the World Commission on Ethics (COMEST) of the UNESCO, and co-founded the Abel Prize. He has also edited the journal Nordisk Matematisk Tidsskrift. He was a member of the Norwegian Academy of Science and Letters.

Fenstad resided in Østerås. He died from COVID-19 on 13 April 2020, two days before his 85th birthday.

== See also ==
- Influence of non-standard analysis

Academic offices
Preceded by Bjørn Pedersen	Vice rector of the University of Oslo; 1989–1993	Succeeded by Arild Underdal
Preceded by Laurence Jonathan Cohen	President of the DLMPST/IUHPST; 1991–1995	Succeeded by Wesley Salmon
