= Inge Lønning =

Norwegian theologist and politician

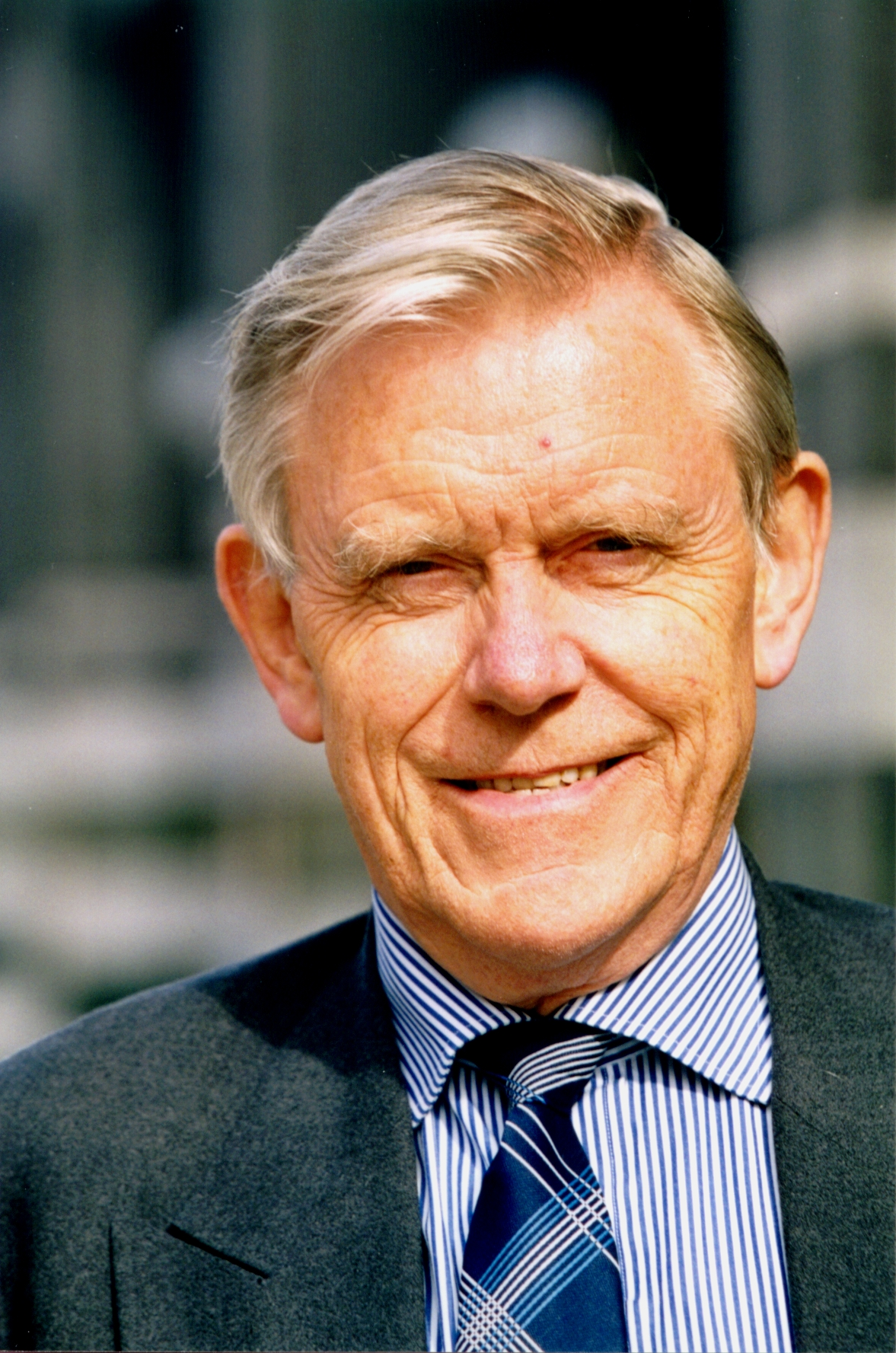
- Lønning in 2003.

President of the Lagting
- In office 10 October 2005 – 30 September 2009
- Vice President: Jon Lilletun; Ola T. Lånke
- Preceded by: Lodve Solholm
- Succeeded by: Position abolished

Vice President of the Storting
- In office 9 October 2001 – 30 September 2005
- President: Jørgen Kosmo
- Preceded by: Hans J. Røsjorde
- Succeeded by: Carl I. Hagen

First Deputy Leader of the Conservative Party
- In office 29 March 1998 – 5 May 2002
- Leader: Jan Petersen
- Preceded by: Børge Brende
- Succeeded by: Erna Solberg

President of the Norwegian European Movement
- In office 31 January 1993 – 5 March 1995
- Preceded by: Fredrik Vogt-Lorentzen
- Succeeded by: Gro Balas

Rector of the University of Oslo
- In office 1 January 1985 – 31 December 1992
- Preceded by: Bjarne A. Waaler
- Succeeded by: Lucy Smith

Member of the Norwegian Parliament
- In office 1 October 1997 – 30 September 2009
- Constituency: Oslo

Personal details
- Born: Inge Johan Lønning; 20 February 1938 Fana, Norway
- Died: 24 March 2013 (aged 75) Beitostølen, Norway
- Party: Conservative
- Spouse(s): Kari Andersen (m. 1962–2008; her death); Mari Mæland (m. 2012–2013; his death)
- Children: 4, including Lars Lønning
- Education: University of Oslo

Military service
- Allegiance: Norway
- Branch/service: Navy

Inge Johan Lønning (20 February 1938 – 24 March 2013) was a Norwegian Lutheran theologian and politician for the Conservative Party of Norway. As an academic, he was Professor of Theology and Rector of the University of Oslo during the term 1985–1992. As a politician, he served as President of the European Movement in Norway, as a Member of Parliament, as Vice President of the Parliament, as Vice President of the Conservative Party, and as President of the Nordic Council.

== Biography ==
Lønning was born in Fana, Bergen, Norway. He was the son of Per Lønning (1898–1974) and Anna Gurine Strømø (1895–1966). His older brother was Bishop Per Lønning (1928–2016). He earned his cand. theol. degree from the University of Oslo in 1962 and finished the practical-theological seminar in 1963. He continued his academic career with a fellowship from 1963 to 1971, with a year's interruption for military service as a chaplain in the Norwegian Navy. He earned his doctorate in theology at the University of Oslo in 1971 and was appointed professor in systematic theology at the University of Oslo the same year. In 1985 he was elected rector of the University of Oslo, serving until 1992, while maintaining his chair as professor of theology until his retirement in 2008.

In 1971, Lønning also started his political career, when he was elected into the Oslo city council for one term and also the city's board of education for eight years. Lønning was elected as a member of Norwegian parliament for three terms, from 1997 through 2009. He was (at the time of his death) the president of Lagtinget, was vice president of Stortinget from 2001 to 2005, and also served as a member of several parliamentary committees.

He was president of the Nordic Council in 2003, and was awarded honorary doctorates from Luther College and Åbo Akademi University. He was a member of the Norwegian Academy of Science and Letters.

He died on 24 March 2013, after he fell ill while cross country skiing at Beitostølen.

== Selected works ==
- Frihet til tro. En bok om Bibel og bekjennelse (Oslo: Gyldendal. 1980) ISBN 978-82-05-12336-6
- Fellesskap og frihet. Tid for idépolitikk (Oslo: Genesis.1997) ISBN 978-82-476-0029-0

Academic offices
Preceded by Bjarne A. Waaler	Rectors of the University of Oslo; 1985–1992	Succeeded by Lucy Smith
