= Kaare R. Norum =

Norwegian physician and professor (1932–2019)

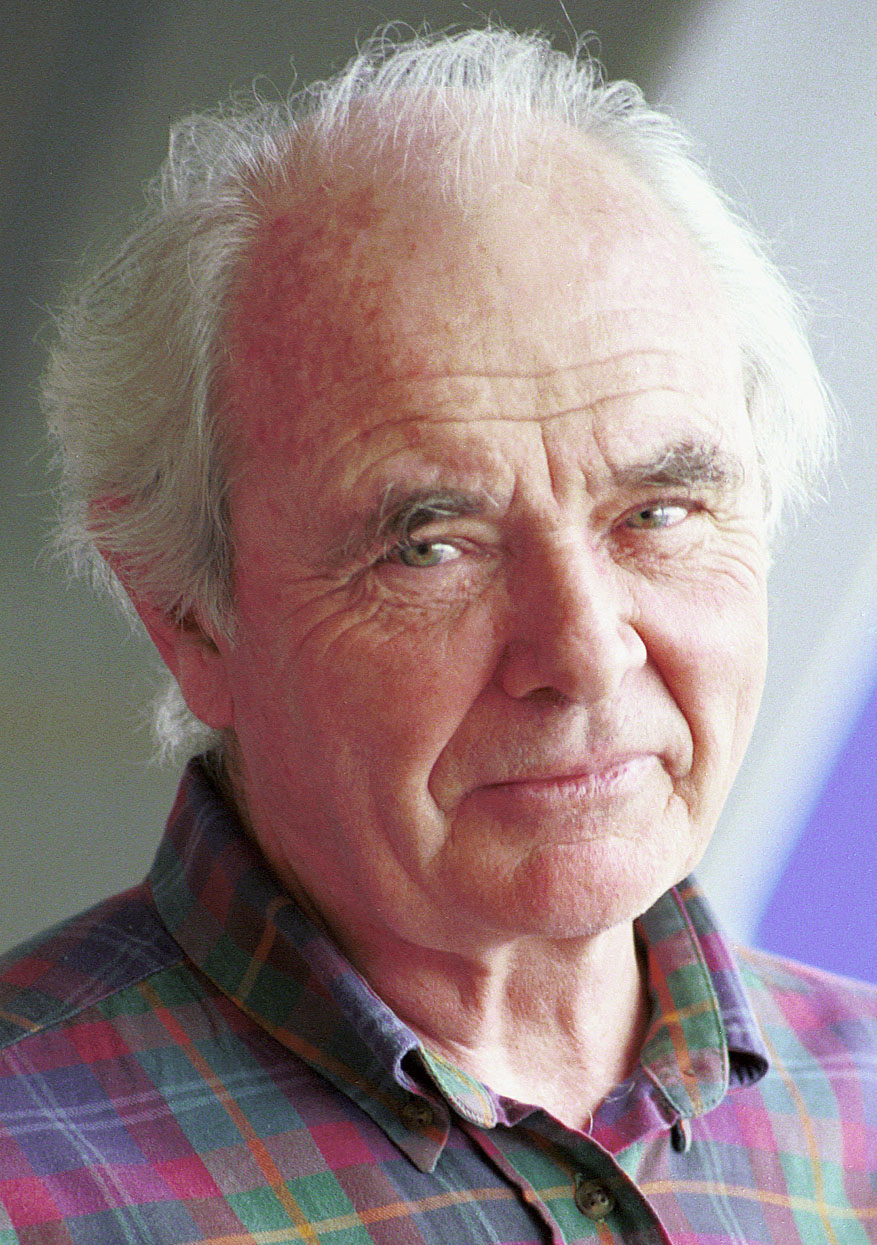
Kaare Norum, 2010.

Kaare Reidar Norum (24 December 1932 – 22 November 2019) was a Norwegian physician and professor of nutrition. He served as rector of the University of Oslo from 1999 to 2001.

He was born in Oslo. He was hired as a docent at the University of Oslo in 1969 and advanced to professor in 1972. He served as vice dean of the Faculty of Medicine from 1983 to 1985, dean from 1986 to 1988 and rector from 1999 to 2001.

He was a fellow of the Norwegian Academy of Science and Letters since 1986; Commander of the Order of St. Olav in 1999 (Knight since 1992) and Commander of the Order of the Polar Star.

Norum became a member of Statens ernæringsråd in 1971 and chaired the council several times. He appeared numerous times in the Norwegian Broadcasting Corporation, speaking on topics within nutrition, notably together with Ingrid Espelid Hovig.

Academic offices
Preceded by Ivar Hørven	Dean of the University of Oslo Faculty of Medicine; 1986–1988	Succeeded by Erik Thorsby
Preceded by Lucy Smith	Rector of the University of Oslo; 1999–2001	Succeeded by Arild Underdal
