= L. Jonathan Cohen =

British philosopher (1923–2006)

Laurence Jonathan Cohen, FBA (7 May 1923 – 26 September 2006) was a British philosopher. He was Fellow and Praelector in Philosophy, 1957–90 and Senior Tutor, 1985–90 at The Queen's College, Oxford and was a British Academy Reader in Humanities, University of Oxford, 1982–84.

He was educated at St. Paul's School, London and Balliol College, Oxford.

== Career ==
- World War II: in Naval Intelligence in UK and SEAC, 1942–45, and Lieut (Sp.) RNVR
- Assistant in Logic and Metaphysics, Edinburgh University, 1947–50
- Lecturer in Philosophy, St. Andrews University, 1950–57
- Commonwealth Fund Fellow in Logic at Princeton and Harvard, 1952–53
- Visiting Lecturer, Hebrew University, Jerusalem, 1952
- Visiting Professor: Columbia University, 1967; Yale University, 1972; Northwestern University, 1988
- Visiting Fellow, Australian National University, 1980.
- Fellow, The Queen's College, Oxford 1957–1990
- Senior Tutor, The Queen's College, Oxford 1985–1990

== Work ==
The principal emphasis in his work was on the powers and use of reasoning and how reasoning should be used properly on professional assessment of evidence in legal and scientific trials.

Initially a political philosopher, he published The Principles of World Citizenship in 1954. He then pursued the question "What do you mean by...?"", in The Diversity of Meaning (1962). This involved philosophy of language and sociology.

His best-known book, The Probable and the Provable (1977), argued in favour of inductive reasoning when making decisions, such as when serving on a jury. The human ability to bring in all the relevant factors when arguing from known specifics to a general conclusion—the essence of inductive reasoning—was in his view far too complex to express in a logical equation. However, he argued that their methods of reasoning could still be held up to inspection and, to some extent, classified.

In clinical and scientific work, he was also concerned with the nature of proof. Another book, Belief and Acceptance (1992), examined the bases of people's assumptions.

== Honours ==
- He was elected a Fellow of the British Academy in 1973
- President, B'nai B'rith Oxford Lodge, 1974
- British Academy Philosophical Lecturer, 1975
- Fry Lecturer, Bristol University, 1976
- Austin Lecturer, UK Association for Legal and Social Philosophy, 1982
- Secretary, International Union of History and Philosophy of Science (Division of Logic, Methodology and Philosophy of Science), 1975–83, Pres., 1987–91
- President, British Society for the Philosophy of Science, 1977–79
- Chairman, British National Committee for Logic, Methodology and Philosophy of Science, 1987–91
- Chairman, Section K (Philosophy), British Academy, 1994–96
- General Editor, Clarendon Library of Logic and Philosophy, 1973–2006

== Publications ==
- The Principles of World Citizenship, 1954
- The Diversity of Meaning, 1962
- The Implications of Induction, 1970
- The Probable and the Provable, 1977
- Applications of Inductive Logic, 1980 (Joint editor)
- Logic, Methodology and Philosophy of Science, 1982 (Joint editor)
- The Dialogue of Reason, 1986
- An Introduction to the Philosophy of Induction and Probability, 1989
- An Essay on Belief and Acceptance, 1992
- Knowledge and Language. Selected Essays of L. Jonathan Cohen, 2002

Academic offices
Preceded by Dana Scott	President of the DLMPST/IUHPST; 1987–1991	Succeeded by Jens Erik Fenstad
