= Bjørn Pedersen =

Norwegian chemist (1933–2024)

- Born: 25 March 1933; Vestre Aker, Norway
- Died: 1 March 2024 (aged 90); Oslo, Norway
- Education: University of Oslo
- Occupation: Chemist

Bjørn Pedersen (25 March 1933 – 1 March 2024) was a Norwegian chemist. He was research leader at SI (which later merged with SINTEF), and was professor of chemistry at the University of Oslo for 24 years. He also served three years as pro-rector at the university.

== Life and career ==
Born in Vestre Aker, Pedersen graduated as a dr.philos. from the University of Oslo in 1964, and subsequently worked as a researcher and eventually research leader for Sentralinstitutt for industriell forskning (SI). From 1979 to 2003, he was appointed professor in chemistry at the University of Oslo. His research included contributions to solid-state chemistry, and the fields of electron paramagnetic resonance spectroscopy and nuclear magnetic resonance spectroscopy.

From 1985 to 1988, he assumed the position of pro-rector at the University of Oslo. As a writer, he issued the textbook Generell kjemi in 1998.

Pedersen received an honorable doctorate from Uppsala University in 1989 and became an honorary member of the Norwegian Chemical Society in 2014.

Pedersen died in Oslo on 1 March 2024, at the age of 90.

== Selected works ==
- Generell kjemi : studiebok for det første kjemiemnet på universitet og høyskole (1 ed.). Oslo: Universitetsforlaget. 1996. ISBN 9788200227540. OCLC 475933760.
- Generell kjemi for universiteter og høyskoler (2 ed.). Oslo: Universitetsforlaget. 1998. ISBN 9788200424130. OCLC 1028293415.
- Syv bidrag til norsk kjemihistorie. Ragnar Bye. Oslo: Skolelaboratoriet i Kjemi, University of Oslo. 2007. ISBN 9788291183084. OCLC 254810561.
