= Who's Counting? Marilyn Waring on Sex, Lies and Global Economics =

- Directed by: Terre Nash
- Written by: Terre Nash
- Produced by: Kent Martin; Don Haig
- Starring: Marilyn Waring, John Kenneth Galbraith, Cinthy Kalye, Gloria Steinem
- Cinematography: Susan Trow
- Release date: 1995
- Running time: 94 minutes
- Country: Canada
- Language: English

Who's Counting? Marilyn Waring on Sex, Lies and Global Economics is a 1995 Canadian documentary film on Marilyn Waring, directed by Terre Nash, produced by the National Film Board of Canada, and largely based on Waring's book If Women Counted (1988).

Sequences from the film were shot in Canada, New Zealand, New York City, the Persian Gulf, and the Philippines. The film includes music from Penny Lang, Penguin Café Orchestra, Brian Eno and Daniel Lanois.

The title is a pun on Sex, Lies, and Videotape (1989).
