= Norwegian Women's Lobby =

Women's rights organization in Norway

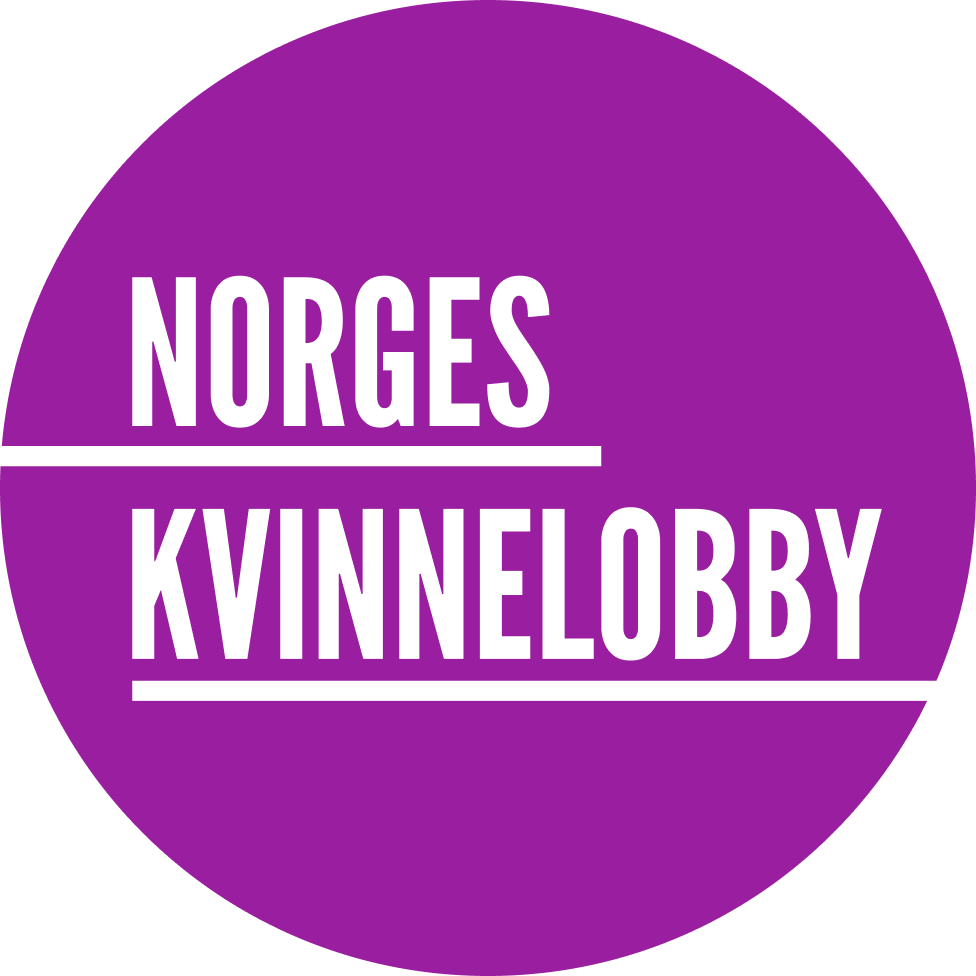
- Formation: 27 January 2014
- Type: NGO
- Purpose: Human rights, gender equality, intersectional feminism
- Location: Oslo, Norway
- Methods: Law reform, political advocacy
- Members: 10 NGOs
- Website: www.kvinnelobby.no

The Norwegian Women's Lobby (NWL; Norwegian: Norges kvinnelobby) is a feminist policy and advocacy organization in Norway and works for "the human rights of girls and women in all their diversity, to eliminate all forms of discrimination against all girls and women and to promote a gender equal society." It is described as the country's "main, national, umbrella organization" for women's rights. NWL understands women's human rights and discrimination in an intersectional perspective and works to represent the interests of all those who identify as women and girls. NWL is funded by the government over the national budget. The mission of the organization is to eliminate all forms of discrimination against women and girls on the basis of the Convention on the Elimination of All Forms of Discrimination Against Women, the Beijing Platform for Action and other fundamental international agreements relating to women's human rights. It works to integrate women's perspectives into all political, economical and social processes.

The implementation of the CEDAW convention is a major focus for NKL, and it works to enhance the implementation, visibility and relevance of CEDAW within politics and society. It states that it "brings together both the key women's organisations and the leading experts on women's rights in Norway" and that it has a focus on being a "cooperation partner for the government [and] to contribute to the representation of the Norwegian women's movement in international forums."

NWL has ten member organizations with a total of nearly 50,000 members and was founded in 2014 by the Norwegian women's organisations on the initiative of the Norwegian Association for Women's Rights, and in accordance with the recommendations of the government-appointed Gender Equality Commission. It was inspired by the European Women's Lobby and also corresponds to comparable umbrella organizations in other countries such as the German Women's Council and the CEDAW Alliance Germany, and the National Women's Council of Ireland. Its member organizations include the Norwegian Association for Women's Rights and the Norwegian Women's Public Health Association, the oldest and largest women's organizations in Norway, respectively.

== History ==
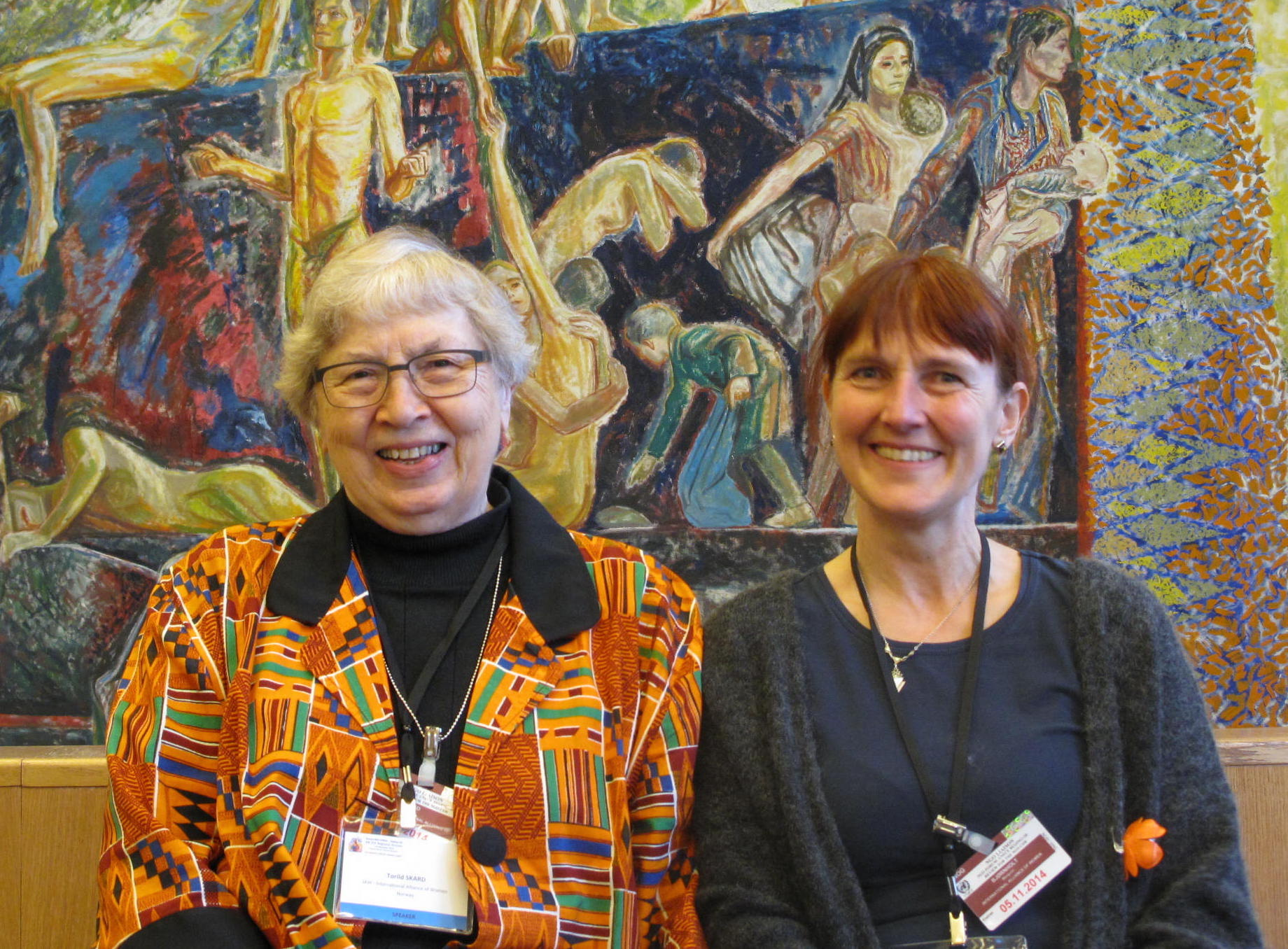
NWL's founding president Margunn Bjørnholt (right) with former NKF president Torild Skard

The Norwegian Women's Lobby was founded on 27 January 2014 by eight nationwide women's rights organisations and several experts on the initiative of the Norwegian Association for Women's Rights (NKF), Norway's oldest and preeminent women's rights NGO, founded in 1884. Its establishment was initiated by NKF Presidents Margunn Bjørnholt, Karin M. Bruzelius and Torild Skard. The establishment of NWL was in accordance with the recommendations of the government-appointed Gender Equality Commission, whose chair Hege Skjeie was actively involved with NWL. Its founding president was Margunn Bjørnholt, a professor of sociology and the NKF President at the time. In 2017 Ragnhild Hennum, a professor of public law, pro-rector of the University of Oslo and director of the Norwegian Centre for Human Rights, was elected president of the organisation.

The founding organisations were described by the Equality and Anti-Discrimination Ombud Sunniva Ørstavik as "the very foundation of the efforts to promote women's rights in Norway." NWL is led by the executive board. The organisation is advised by an independent body of experts, the Expert Committee that includes some of Norway's main experts in this area, e.g. CEDAW expert Anne Hellum.

From its establishment NWL worked to increase awareness and understanding of the CEDAW, promote the participation and influence of women’s organizations in political decision-making processes and address areas where gender equality efforts were lacking, such as gender budgeting. In line with its human rights focus NWL opposes racism, homophobia, transphobia and ableism.

Following negotiations between the Socialist Left Party and the Støre government, NWL was awarded government funding over the national budget.

The member organizations include Norway's oldest women's rights organization, the Norwegian Association for Women's Rights and Norway's largest women's organization, Norwegian Women's Public Health Association. It also includes organizations such as Legal Aid for Women (JURK), the Norwegian Female Lawyers' Association and the Secretariat of the Shelter Movement (Krisesentersekretariatet). Most of the member organizations are also participating in the Forum for Women and Development, which focuses on development issues in the Global South. NWL by contrast has a broader focus on women's human rights nationally and internationally, with an emphasis on international human rights instruments.

In 2018 NWL and five other key NGOs organised the customary torchlight parade in Oslo in honour of that year's Nobel Peace Prize laureates, Denis Mukwege and Nadia Murad, who were awarded the prize for their work to end the use of sexual violence as a weapon of war.

== Activities ==
NWL works for the human rights of girls and women in all their diversity, to eliminate all forms of discrimination against all girls and women and to promote a gender equal society, on the basis of human rights instruments and policy frameworks related to women's rights and gender equality, such as the Convention on the Elimination of All Forms of Discrimination Against Women and the Beijing Platform for Action.

The Norwegian Women's Lobby has a particular focus on the United Nations system and prepares shadow reports to the United Nations Committee on the Elimination of Discrimination Against Women on Norway's implementation of the Convention on the Elimination of All Forms of Discrimination Against Women; the 2017 report was coordinated by Supreme Court Justice Karin Bruzelius.

== Expert Committee ==
NWL's expert committee is a permanent body of experts tasked with making policy recommendations in fields that affect women and girls and gender equality, and works under the sponsorship of the Norwegian Women's Lobby. Established in 2016, the expert committee was initially chaired by professor of sociology Cathrine Holst. The initial committee members also included supreme court justice Karin Bruzelius, professor of public law Anne Hellum, and professor of political science Hege Skjeie, the former chair of the government-appointed Gender Equality Commission. In 2020 Nita Kapoor, Helga Eggebø, Johanne Sundby and Mari Teigen were appointed to the committee.

== See also ==
- National Council of German Women's Organizations
- National Women's Council of Ireland
