= Ruth Vatvedt Fjeld =

Norwegian linguist

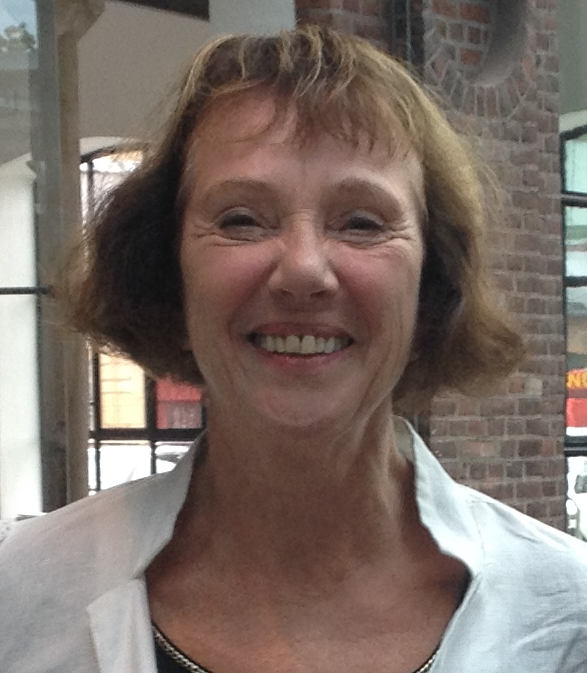

19th Pro-Rector of the University of Oslo
- In office 2013–2014
- Preceded by: Inga Bostad
- Succeeded by: Vacant

Personal details
- Born: 8 May 1948 (age 77) Aremark
- Occupation: Professor of Lexicography and Dialect Research

Ruth Eldbjørg Vatvedt Fjeld (born 8 May 1948 in Aremark) is a Norwegian linguist. She is a Professor of Lexicography and Dialect Research at the University of Oslo.

She obtained the dr.philos. degree at the University of Oslo in 1998, with the dissertation Rimelig ut fra sakens art. Om tolkning av ubestemte adjektiv i regelgivende språk. She has been responsible for a large project on the lexicography of bokmål (Det leksikografiske bokmålskorpuset; LBK) since 2000. She has also served as the expert adviser on language to the Norwegian Broadcasting Corporation.

In 2013, she was elected as the Pro-Rector of the University of Oslo, its second highest position, for the term 2013-2017. However, in 2014 she resigned from her position as Pro-Rector, citing harassment of her by Rector Ole Petter Ottersen and stating that she was deprived of most responsibilities associated with her position as the university's Pro-Rector and not involved in the decision-making process.

Academic offices
Preceded by Inga Bostad	Pro-Rector of the University of Oslo; 2013–2014 (resigned)	Succeeded by Vacant
