= Svein Stølen =

Norwegian chemist (born 1960)

Professor Svein Stølen Dr.scient.
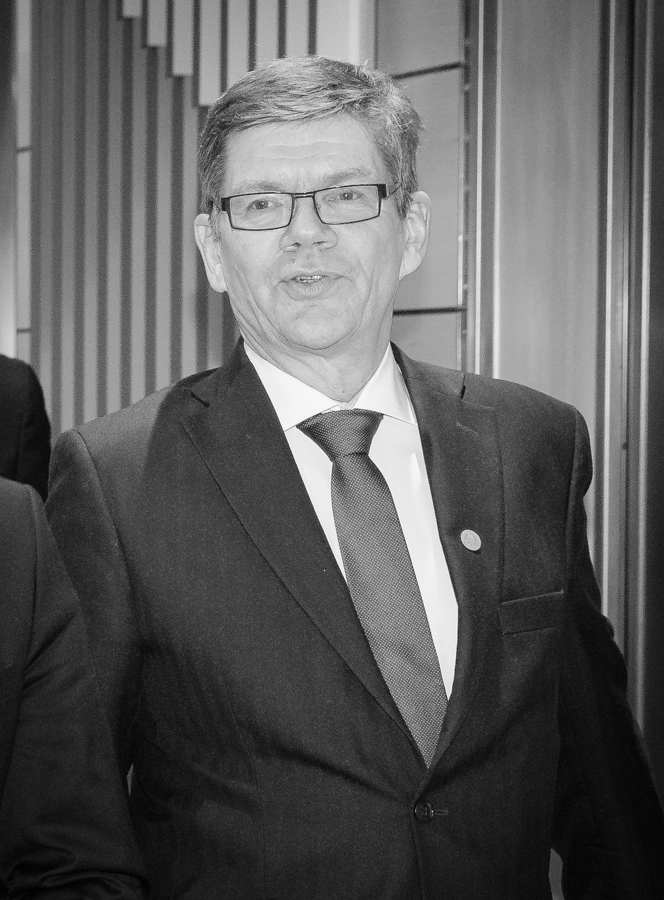

Rector of the University of Oslo
- In office 2017–2025
- Preceded by: Ole Petter Ottersen

Personal details
- Born: 2 March 1960 (age 66) Fredrikstad

Svein Stølen (born 2 March 1960) is a Norwegian chemist. He has served as Rector of the University of Oslo since 2017.

== Biography ==
Stølen was born in Fredrikstad on 2 March 1960. He graduated as cand.scient. in 1985 and as dr.scient. in 1988, and was appointed professor in chemistry from 1996. His research interests have focused on structure and properties of inorganic compounds. He was elected as the Rector of the University of Oslo for the period 2017 to 2021. He was re-elected as rector for the period 2021 to 2025.

Academic offices
Preceded by Ole Petter Ottersen	Rector of the University of Oslo; 2017–present	Incumbent
