= Ole Petter Ottersen =

Norwegian medical academic

Professor Ole Petter Ottersen Dr.med.
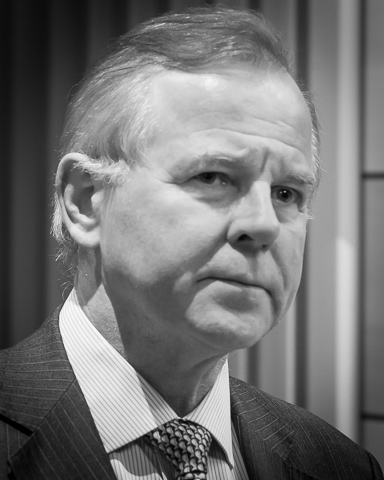

Rector of the University of Oslo
- In office 2009–2017
- Preceded by: Geir Ellingsrud
- Succeeded by: Svein Stølen

Rector of the Karolinska Institute
- Incumbent
- Assumed office 2017
- Preceded by: Karin Dahlman-Wright (acting)

Personal details
- Born: 17 March 1955 (age 71) Kongsberg, Norway

Ole Petter Ottersen (born 17 March 1955) is a Norwegian physician and neuroscientist. He took office as the rector of Karolinska Institute in Sweden in August 2017. Ottersen has been professor of medicine at the University of Oslo since 1992 and served as the university's directly-elected rector from 2009 to 2017.

== Early life and education ==
Ole Petter Ottersen graduated with the cand.med. degree at the University of Oslo in 1980 and with the dr.med. degree (Med.Sc.D.; a higher doctorate in medicine) at the same university in 1982.

== Career ==
Ottersen was a research fellow at the Institute of Anatomy at the University of Oslo from 1978 to 1983 and a prosector (which in Norway is an academic rank in anatomy equal to reader) at the same institute from 1983 to 1992. He was promoted to professor in 1992.

He has been head of department of the Institute of Anatomy (1997–1999), Pro-Dean for Research of the Faculty of Medicine (2000–2002) and director of the Centre for Molecular Biology and Neuroscience at the University of Oslo (2002–2009), a centre of excellence funded by the Research Council of Norway. He was editor-in-chief of the journal Neuroscience 2006–2009.

=== Rector of the University of Oslo ===
In 2009, he was elected as the rector of the University of Oslo, while Inga Bostad was elected as the pro-rector. At the University of Oslo the rector is directly elected to a four-year term by all employees and students, and may serve a maximum of two terms; the rector is the university's ceremonial head, chief executive officer and chairman of the board and thus corresponds to both the chancellor and the vice chancellor at a British university. By convention and formerly also by law, the rector is elected among the professors at the university. The rector's deputy and the university's second highest official, the pro-rector, is also directly elected alongside the rector.

In 2013, he was re-elected for a second term, while Ruth Vatvedt Fjeld was elected as the new Pro-Rector; she resigned the following year and was succeeded by Ragnhild Hennum.

Ottersen became a board member of Oslo University Hospital in 2011 and became chairman of the board of the Norwegian Association of Higher Education Institutions in 2013. He attended the Bilderberg Group meeting in 2011.

=== Rector of Karolinska Institute ===
On 20 February 2017 the board of the Karolinska Institute in Sweden nominated Ottersen to become rector of Karolinska Institute. He was formally appointed as rector by the Government of Sweden on 27 April 2017 and assumed the position on 1 August 2017.

In 2019 Ottersen became a member of the Lancet–SIGHT Commission on Peaceful Societies Through Health and Gender Equality, chaired by Tarja Halonen.

== Research ==
Ottersen's research field is neuroscience. He is particularly noted for his research on molecular mechanisms involved in the development of acute and chronic neurodegenerative disease, with a special emphasis on the role of cellular water balance and glutamate excitotoxicity.

In 2001, he, together with Jon Storm-Mathisen and Per Brandtzæg, was found to be the most-cited Norwegian scholar in international academic journals. According to Google Scholar, he has been cited over 38,000 times in scientific literature and has an h-index of 104. From 2002, he was included in the Institute of Scientific Information list of "Highly Cited Researchers."

== Awards ==
- Anders Jahre Prize for Young Scientists, 1990
- Member of the Norwegian Academy of Science and Letters, 1993
- Member of the Academy of Sciences Leopoldina, 1999
- Lundbeck Foundation's research prize (with Jon Storm-Mathisen), 2005
- Member of the Royal Norwegian Society of Sciences and Letters, 2006
- Anders Jahre Award for Medical Research, 2008
- Honorary doctor, University of Eastern Finland, 2010
- Honorary doctor, École normale supérieure de Lyon, 2015
- Member of the Academia Europaea, 2017

Academic offices
Preceded by Geir Ellingsrud	Rector of the University of Oslo; 2009–2017	Succeeded by Svein Stølen
Preceded by Karin Dahlman-Wright (acting)	Rector of the Karolinska Institute; August 2017–	Incumbent
