= Trish Bradbury =

New Zealand sports management academic

Trish Bradbury ONZM
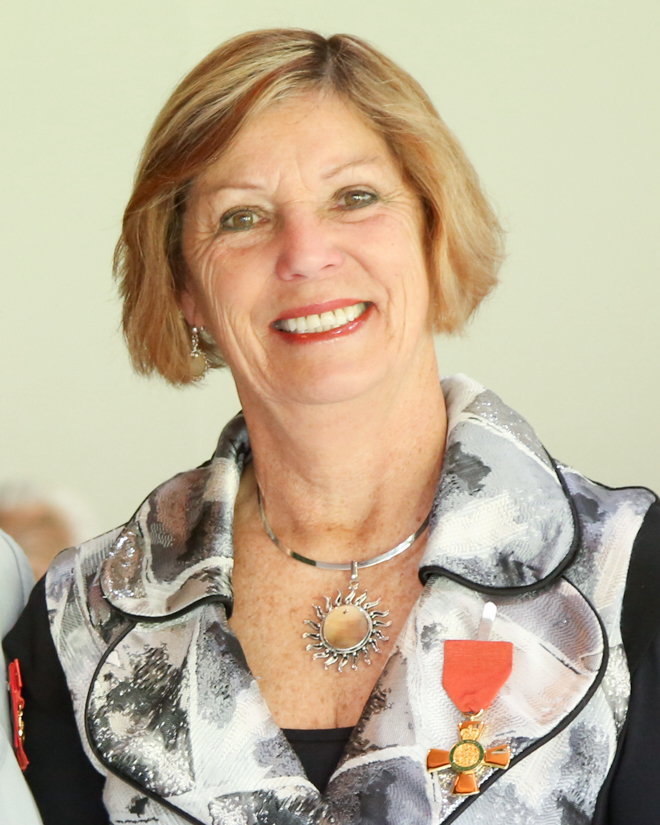
- Bradbury in 2024
- Other name: Patricia Elizabeth Florence Bradbury

Academic background
- Education: Massey University
- Thesis: Athletes doing it for themselves: self-coaching experiences of New Zealand olympians (2000)
- Doctoral advisor: Marilyn Waring; Denny Meyer

Patricia Elizabeth Florence Bradbury ONZM is a New Zealand academic, who retired as a full professor at Massey University, specialising in sport management, in December 2023. In 2024, she was appointed an Officer of the New Zealand Order of Merit, for services to sport and education.

== Academic career ==
Bradbury completed a Master of Physical Education degree at the University of Ottawa. She then moved to New Zealand to take up a lecturing position at Massey University's Albany campus in 1993, where she was the programme leader, and initially the sole teacher, of the sports and recreation management programme. She completed a PhD titled Athletes doing it for themselves: self-coaching experiences of New Zealand Olympians at Massey in 2000. Bradbury remained at Massey and held a number of senior roles at the university, including university proctor.

Bradbury researched professional and amateur sport management in New Zealand, including leading research on topics such as the experiences of women and girls officiating in sport.

Bradbury was a board member of the World Association of Sport Management, and held roles in the Sport Management Association of Australia and New Zealand, with Paralympics New Zealand, University and Tertiary Sport New Zealand, and Volleyball New Zealand. She was protocol officer at Eden Park during the 2023 FIFA Women's World Cup.

Bradbury retired from the university in 2023.

== Honours and awards ==
Bradbury was awarded Massey University's Richard Buchanan Teaching Excellence Award and, after her retirement, the title Distinguished Friend of Massey.

In the 2024 King's Birthday Honours, Bradbury was appointed an Officer of the New Zealand Order of Merit, for services to sport and education.

== Selected works ==
- Bradbury, Trish; O'Boyle, Ian, eds. (19 January 2017). Understanding Sport Management International perspectives (1st ed.). Routledge. ISBN 9781138100633.
- Bradbury, Patricia Elizabeth Florence; Roger Mitchell; Kaye Thorn (2020). "Moving forward: business model solutions for amateur sport clubs". Managing Sport and Leisure. 26 (3): 189–205. doi:10.1080/23750472.2020.1734479. Wikidata Q125184648.
- Bradbury, Patricia Elizabeth Florence; Ian O’Boyle (2015). "Batting above average: Governance at New Zealand cricket". Corporate Ownership and Control. 12 (4): 352–363. doi:10.22495/cocv12i4c3p3. Wikidata Q127660827.
- Bradbury, Patricia Elizabeth Florence; Darryl Forsyth (2012). "You're in; you're out: selection practices of coaches". Sport, Business and Management. 2 (1): 7–20. doi:10.1108/20426781211207638. Wikidata Q127661446.
- Simon R. Walters; Vincent Minjares; Bradbury, Patricia Elizabeth Florence; Patricia Lucas; Andrew Lenton; Kirsten Spencer; Simone Spencer (2022). "Promoting a culture change in junior and youth sport in New Zealand". Frontiers in sports and active living. 4. doi:10.3389/fspor.2022.811603. PMID 36172341. Wikidata Q122967988.
