= Lucy Smith (legal scholar) =

Norwegian legal scholar and professor of law

Lucy Caroline Smith (née Dahl; 12 October 1934 – 27 August 2013) was a Norwegian legal scholar and professor of law at the University of Oslo. She served as rector of the university from 1993 to 1998.

She was a member of the Norwegian Academy of Science and Letters. In 1987 she became Norway's first female (full) professor of law. She has published the book Foreldremyndighet og barnerett. Smith was a member of the U.N. Committee on the Rights of the Child. In the 1980s, Smith became well known to the public as the principal judge of the popular quiz show Kvitt eller dobbelt.

Smith was the wife of Carsten Smith, the former Chief Justice of Norway's Supreme Court. Before that appointment, he was also a law professor at the University of Oslo.

== Education ==
After attending Oslo Cathedral School, Smith studied law, graduating in 1959.

Academic offices
Preceded by Inge Lønning	Rector of the University of Oslo; 1993–1998	Succeeded by Kaare R. Norum
Non-profit organization positions
Preceded by Karl Lorck	Chair of the Norwegian Polytechnic Society; 1984–1986	Succeeded by Lars U. Thulin
