= Jane Freedman =

British–French sociologist and international relations scholar

Professor Jane Freedman
- Born: 21 September 1968 (age 58)

Academic background
- Education: University of Oxford, London School of Economics, Sciences Po

Academic work
- Discipline: Sociology, international relations
- Institutions: King's College London, University of Southampton, Pantheon-Sorbonne University, Paris 8 University
- Main interests: Gender and international politics, international migration, refugees and asylum, gender-based violence, armed conflict

Jane Freedman (born 21 September 1968 in London) is a British–French sociologist and international relations scholar. She is known for her research on issues relating to gender, violence, conflict and migration, including sexual and gender-based violence in armed conflicts and against migrants and refugees. Her research has focused e.g. on violence in the Democratic Republic of the Congo and the refugees of the Syrian Civil War. She "examines women's experiences of forced migration, the insecurities they face and the obstacles that exist to providing full protection of women."

She held the Marie Curie Chair of Politics and International Relations at the Pantheon-Sorbonne University from 2006 to 2009 and then became Professor of Politics at the Paris 8 University. She is affiliated with the Centre de recherches sociologiques et politiques de Paris, a joint centre of the CNRS and the Paris 8 University. She has also served as an expert to several United Nations agencies.

== Career ==
She earned a BA in Philosophy, Politics and Economics at the University of Oxford in 1990, an MSc in Political Theory at the London School of Economics in 1991, a DEA in political science at Sciences Po in 1992 and a doctorate in sociology at the Paris Diderot University in 1996.

She was a lecturer in French politics at the Department of European Studies at King's College London 1996–1998 and then joined the University of Southampton as a lecturer, senior lecturer and eventually as a reader in politics and international relations. She held the Marie Curie Chair of Politics and International Relations at the Pantheon-Sorbonne University from 2006 to 2009 and then became Professor of Politics at the Paris 8 University. She is also affiliated with the Centre de Recherches Sociologiques et Politiques de Paris at CNRS.

She has served as an expert to UNESCO, the United Nations High Commissioner for Refugees and the European Commission on gender, peace and security, prevention of violence against women, women asylum and migration, and women's political participation. In 2016 she was the inaugural distinguished visiting scholar at the Mary Robinson Centre, Ireland's first presidential centre and library.

In response to Brexit, Freedman said she intends to apply for French citizenship and that "it is horrible what is happening to my country."

== Scholarly work ==
Freedman's research has focused on gender and international politics, international migration, refugees and asylum, gender-based violence and armed conflict. She has carried out research for example on gender-based violence in African countries, such as the Democratic Republic of the Congo. She has also carried out extensive research on immigration to Europe, including the European migrant crisis.

== Bibliography ==
- A Gendered Approach to the Syrian Refugee Crisis (ed. with Z. Kivilcim and N. Ozgur), Routledge, 2016
- Gendering the International Asylum and Refugee Debate (2nd ed.), Palgrave Macmillan, 2015
- Gender, Violence and Politics in the Democratic Republic of the Congo, Routledge, 2015
- Engaging Men in the Fight against Gender-Based Violence: Case Studies from Africa (ed.), Palgrave Macmillan, 2012
- Gendering the International Asylum and Refugee Debate, Palgrave Macmillan, 2007
- Femmes, Genre, Migrations et Mondialisation: Un état des problématiques (ed. with J. Falquet, A. Rabaud and F. Scrinzi), Cedref, 2007
- Persécutions des femmes: savoirs, mobilisations et protections (ed. with J. Valluy), Editions du Croquant, 2007
- Immigration and Insecurity in France, Ashgate Publishing, 2004
- Gender and Insecurity: Migrant Women in Europe (ed), Ashgate Publishing, 2003
- Feminism, Open University Press, 2001
- Women, Immigration and Identities in France (ed. with C. Tarr), Berg, 2000
- Femmes politiques: mythes et symboles, L'Harmattan, 1997
