= Arild Underdal =

Norwegian political scientist (1946–2025)

- Born: 13 August 1946; Bodø, Norway
- Died: 20 April 2025 (aged 78)
- Occupation: Political scientist
- Employer: University of Oslo
- Awards: Order of St. Olav (2006)

Arild Underdal (13 August 1946 – 20 April 2025) was a Norwegian political scientist.

== Life and career ==
Underdal was born in Bodø on 13 August 1946. He was professor at BI Norwegian Business School from 1984 to 1986, and was appointed professor of international politics at the University of Oslo from 1987. He served as rector of the University of Oslo from 2002 to 2006.

Underdal was a fellow of the Norwegian Academy of Science and Letters. He was decorated Commander of the Order of St. Olav in 2006.

Underdal died on 20 April 2025, at the age of 78.

Academic offices
Preceded by Kaare R. Norum	Rector of the University of Oslo; 2002–2006	Succeeded by Geir Ellingsrud
