= Haakon Breien Benestad =

Norwegian physiologist

Haakon Breien Benestad (born 23 October 1940) is a Norwegian physiologist and hematologist.

He was born in Oslo as a son of chief physician Gunnar Benestad and Liv Ingeborg Breien. The family moved to Haugesund. He graduated from the University of Oslo with the cand.med. degree in 1965, and held early-career posts as a physician, among others in Haugesund and Tana before becoming a research fellow at the University of Oslo's Institute of Physiology in 1968.

His research being supervised by Arne Bøyum, Benestad took the dr.med. degree in 1972 with the thesis Murine haematopoiesis studied with the diffusion chamber technique. He promptly became an associate professor, advancing to professor of cell physiology in 1990.

He sat on the editorial board of Experimental Hematology from 1981 to 1983, penned numerous articles and wrote the textbook Anatomi, fysiologi og immunologi with Jens-Gustav Iversen in 1986. Among students, Benestad and Iversen were also known for a compendium on basic research and science. He wrote 150 columns for the Journal of the Norwegian Medical Association. He was inducted into the Norwegian Academy of Science and Letters in 1994.

Benestad also held numerous posts within the university administration. He was the director of the Institute of Physiology from 1984 to 1987, sat on the University of Oslo board (the Academic College) from 1990, and was the prorector from 2006 to 2009 under Geir Ellingsrud.

Benestad was married twice, settling at Fossum in Bærum.
