= James Heintz =

American economist

- Born: March 25, 1968 (age 58); Lexington, Kentucky
- Scientific career
- Fields: Economics
- Workplaces: University of Massachusetts, Amherst

James St. Clair Heintz (born March 25, 1968) is an American economist. He is the Andrew Glyn Professor of Economics at the University of Massachusetts, Amherst. He has written on job creation, global labor standards, the distributive consequences of macroeconomic policies and human rights. He has also served as an expert to the International Labour Organization, the United Nations Development Program (UNDP), the United Nations Research Institute for Social Development well as the Economic Commission for Africa. His research has particularly focused on the relationship between economic policy and economic and social rights.

He earned as master's degree at the University of Minnesota and a Ph.D. in economics at the University of Massachusetts.
