= Dan Banik =

Norwegian political scientist

- Education: University of Oslo (BA, MA, PhD)
- Occupation: Professor
- Employer: University of Oslo
- Website: www.globe.uio.no/personer/vit/danbanik/

Dan Banik is a political scientist whose research focuses on development, governance, democracy and sustainable development, with particular attention to Africa and Asia. He is a Professor of Political Science at the University of Oslo, where he directs the Oslo SDG Initiative at the Center for Global Sustainability. He is also Academic Director of the Knowledge Hub on Democracy in the Circle U. European University Alliance. He has held academic positions at institutions including Stanford University, China Agricultural University in Beijing, the University of Pretoria and the University of Pisa.

== Career ==
Banik has worked on issues related to development, governance, poverty reduction and sustainable development. His research has examined political and institutional aspects of development, including governance challenges in Africa and Asia, democracy, poverty reduction, geopolitics, electricity access in Africa, and India's healthcare paradox.

Between 2010 to 2017, Banik held positions at Stanford University, including as a Consulting Scholar at Center on Democracy, Development and the Rule of Law (CDDRL) where his work focused on Malawi and Zambia.

From 2012 to 2017, he served as an adjunct professor at China Agricultural University in Beijing. He is also an Extraordinary Professor at the University of Pretoria in South Africa.

Banik has been involved in academic collaborations on sustainable development in Ethiopia, including the establishment of the Centre for Sustainable Development at Addis Ababa University through cooperation involving Addis Ababa University, the University of Oslo, and the University of Malawi.

== Other roles ==
Banik has worked with the World Bank where he served as the head of the Norwegian-Finnish Trust Fund.

He has also served on the board of the Crown Prince and Crown Princess' Foundation, which supports and empowers of young individuals in Norway.

In 2023, Norway's Minister of International Development, Anne Beathe Tvinnereim, appointed Banik to be a part of an expert group tasked with producing recommendations on financing and development measures to support achievement of the Sustainable Development Goals.

== Public engagement ==
Beyond his academic work, Banik has engaged in public communication on development issues through media commentary and podcasting.

Banik has frequently contributed to public discussions on development and governance issues through international media, including The Nation Malawi, L'express Mauritius, Panorama nyheter, and Khrono.

Dan Banik hosts the podcast, In Pursuit of Development, which features discussions with researchers, policymakers, and practitioners on topics including democracy, poverty, inequality, sustainability and global development. The podcast reflects themes central to Banik's work including, governance, development policy, and climate change.

== Selected publications ==
=== Books ===
- Chinsinga, Blessings; Dan Banik, eds. (2016-06-22). Political Transition and Inclusive Development in Malawi: The democratic dividend. London: Routledge. doi:10.4324/9781315683898. ISBN 978-1-315-68389-8.
- Banik, Dan, ed. (2016-11-15). The Legal Empowerment Agenda: Poverty, Labour and the Informal Economy in Africa. London: Routledge. doi:10.4324/9781315238739. ISBN 978-1-315-23873-9.
- Banik, Dan (2010). Poverty and elusive development. Oslo: Universitetsforl. ISBN 978-82-15-01218-6.
- McNeish, John-Andrew; Robbins, Edward; Nielsen, Kenneth; Brøther, Mona Elisabeth (2008). Banik, Dan (ed.). Rights and legal empowerment in eradicating poverty. Farnham: Ashgate. ISBN 978-0-7546-7498-6.
- Banik, Dan (2007). Starvation and India's democracy. Routledge advances in South Asian studies (1. publ ed.). London: Routledge. ISBN 978-0-203-96288-6.
- Banik, Dan (2006). Poverty, politics and development: interdisciplinary perspectives (1. Aufl ed.). Bergen: Fagbokforlaget. ISBN 978-82-450-0397-0.

=== Journal articles ===
- Biermann, Frank; Sun, Yixian; Banik, Dan; Beisheim, Marianne; Bloomfield, Michael J.; Charles, Aurelie; Chasek, Pamela; Hickmann, Thomas; Pradhan, Prajal; Sénit, Carole-Anne (2023-09-15). "Four governance reforms to strengthen the SDGs". Science. 381 (6663): 1159–1160. Bibcode:2023Sci...381.1159B. doi:10.1126/science.adj5434. hdl:11370/59ee300d-f2bc-41e5-b1ac-5008ee583ed2. ISSN 0036-8075. PMID 37708286. S2CID 261736542.
- Banik, Dan; Mawdsley, Emma (May 2023). "South–South Cooperation and global development in a multipolar world: China and India in Africa". Journal of International Development. 35 (4): 539–548. doi:10.1002/jid.3789. ISSN 0954-1748. S2CID 258545369.
- Banik, Dan (July 2022). "Democracy and Sustainable Development". Anthropocene Science. 1 (2): 233–245. Bibcode:2022AnthS...1..233B. doi:10.1007/s44177-022-00019-z. ISSN 2731-3980. PMC 9051790.
- Kayuni, Happy; Banik, Dan; Chunga, Joseph J. (2021-11-11). "The perils of megaphone diplomacy on Malawi's ambitious Shire- Zambezi Waterway project". Africa Review. 13 (2): 270–289. doi:10.1080/09744053.2021.1943265. ISSN 0974-4053. S2CID 235769638.
- Banik, Dan; Chasukwa, Michael (December 2019). "The Politics of Hunger in an SDG Era: Food Policy in Malawi". Food Ethics. 4 (2): 189–206. doi:10.1007/s41055-019-00055-3. ISSN 2364-6853. S2CID 213049151.
- Banik, Dan; Bull, Benedicte (2018-07-04). "Chinese engagement in Africa and Latin America: does it matter for state capacity?". Third World Thematics: A TWQ Journal. 3 (4): 532–551. doi:10.1080/23802014.2018.1531682. hdl:10852/72575. ISSN 2380-2014. S2CID 158115920.

== Personal life ==
Banik is married to Vibeke Kieding Banik.
