= Glasgow School for Business and Society =

Coordinates: 55°52′02″N 4°15′01″W

- Type: public university business school
- Established: 2002
- Parent institution: Glasgow Caledonian University
- Dean: John Lennon
- Location: Glasgow, Scotland
- Website: www.gcu.ac.uk/aboutgcu/academicschools/gsbs

The Glasgow School for Business and Society is the business school of Glasgow Caledonian University, and was established in 2002, originally named the Caledonian Business School. It offers programs in business studies, law and the social sciences. Its main campus is located in Glasgow, with an additional campus in London (GCU London).

The school collaborates in three cross-disciplinary research centres: the Moffat Centre (researching tourism and travel), the WiSE Centre for Economic Justice (researching the contribution of women to Scotland's economy) and the Yunus Centre for Social Business and Health (researching the links between social business and health improvement).

== Organisation ==
=== Departments ===
The school consists of six departments:

- Economics and Law
- Fashion, Marketing, Tourism and Events
- Finance, Accounting and Risk
- Management and HRM
- Media and Journalism
- Social Sciences

=== Management ===
The dean is John Lennon, supported by three associate deans: Dawn Anderson (international), John Harris (research) and Samantha MacLean (learning, teaching and quality).
