= Alison Preston =

Australian economist

Alison Preston is an Australian economist, Winthrop Professor of Economics at the University of Western Australia, and Deputy Dean of UWA Business School. She is an expert on wage determination and wages policy, the gender pay gap and segmentation and labour market structures.

She holds an MPhil in health and labour economics, an MBA and a PhD in economics. Prior to her appointment at UWA, she was Professor of Economics and Director of the Curtin Graduate School of Business at Curtin University.
