= Terre Nash =

Canadian film director (born 1947)

Mary Teresa "Terre" Nash (born 1947) is a Canadian Oscar-winning film director. Her 1982 short documentary If You Love This Planet won the Academy Award for Best Documentary (Short Subject).

Nash was born in Nanaimo, British Columbia. She has a B.A. in literature and sociology and an M.A. in behavioural science and communications from Simon Fraser University. She received the President's Graduate Award, a Canada Council Doctoral Fellowship and the Fonds FCAC Pour l’aide et le Soutien a la Research (Québec). In 1983, Nash earned a Ph.D. on the Dean's List, from McGill University in Montréal. She was the first recipient of the Alumni Award from Simon Fraser University, and was awarded "The Emily" from the Emily Carr University of Art and Design in 2000. Nash has been a guest lecturer at the Columbia School of Journalism in New York City; Concordia University in Montréal; Memorial University, St. John's, NL; Emily Carr University of Art and Design in Vancouver; St. Mary's College and Stanford University in California.

Nash was the subject of the 1990 CBC documentary If You Love Free Speech: An Unguided Tour to the Twilight Zone, directed by Pierre Leduc. The documentary follows Nash on a journey to Washington, D.C., in 1990, where she was invited to testify before a Congressional hearing on free speech. This was the culmination of a 7-year battle, which saw her film If You Love This Planet go from the Oscar podium to the United States Supreme Court, over a Justice Department ruling (The Foreign Agents Registration Act) which required the names of U.S. citizens who rented her film, be reported to the FBI.

== Selected filmography ==
- Josef's Daughter (2006) (editor)
- Boys on the Fringe (2005) (editor)
- Pleasant Street (2004) (editor)
- White Thunder (2003) (editor, writer)
- My Left Breast (2002) (editor)
- Niagara (2000) 6-part series (co-editor, co-writer)
- After Darwin (1999) (editor)
- Penny Lang: Stand Up on High Ground (1998) (editor)
- Kathleen Shannon: on Film, Feminism and Other Dreams (1996) (editor)
- Who's Counting? Marilyn Waring on Sex, Lies and Global Economics (1995) (director, editor, writer)
- Mother Earth (1991) (director and editor)
- Russian Diary (1989) (director, editor and writer)
- A Love Affair with Politics (1986) (director and editor)
- A Writer in the Nuclear Age: A Conversation with Margaret Laurence (1985) (director)
- Speaking Our Peace (1985) (writer and co-director with Bonnie Sherr Klein)
- If You Love This Planet (1982) (director and editor) (as Terri Nash)

== Selected awards ==
- Academy Award for Best Documentary (Short Subject), If You Love This Planet (1982)
- American Film Festival (Blue Ribbon First Prize), If You Love This Planet (1982)
- Silver Medal, Melbourne Film Festival, If You Love This Planet (1982)
- Karlovy Vary Diploma, Prague, If You Love This Planet (1982)
- Atom Award, Science Film Festival, Brazil, If You Love This Planet (1982)
- Leipzig Peace Prize, Leipzig, Germany, If You Love This Planet (1982)
- First Prize, John Muir Film Festival, San Francisco, Speaking Our Peace (1985)
- Opening Film, Nairobi International Women's Film Festival, Kenya, Speaking Our Peace (1985)
- Silver Award, Vermont Peace Film Festival, A Love Affair with Politics (1986)
- Bronze Plaque, Columbus International Film Festival, Russian Diary (1989)
- Ecocine Award for Best Editing, Brazil, Mother Earth (1991)
- Genie Nomination for Best Feature Documentary, Who's Counting? Marilyn Waring on Sex, Lies and Global Economics (1995)
- Prix du Publique, Festival du Cinema, France, Who's Counting? Marilyn Waring on Sex, Lies and Global Economics (1995)
- Chris Award, Columbus International Film Festival, Who's Counting? Marilyn Waring on Sex, Lies and Global Economics (1995)
- Silver Plaque, Chicago International Film Festival, Who's Counting? Marilyn Waring on Sex, Lies and Global Economics (1995)
- First Edition of Documentia, 2003, Santa Cruz de Tenerife International Women's Film Festival, Sexo, Mentiras y Mundializacion, named in honour of Who's Counting?
