= Norwegian Centre for Human Rights =

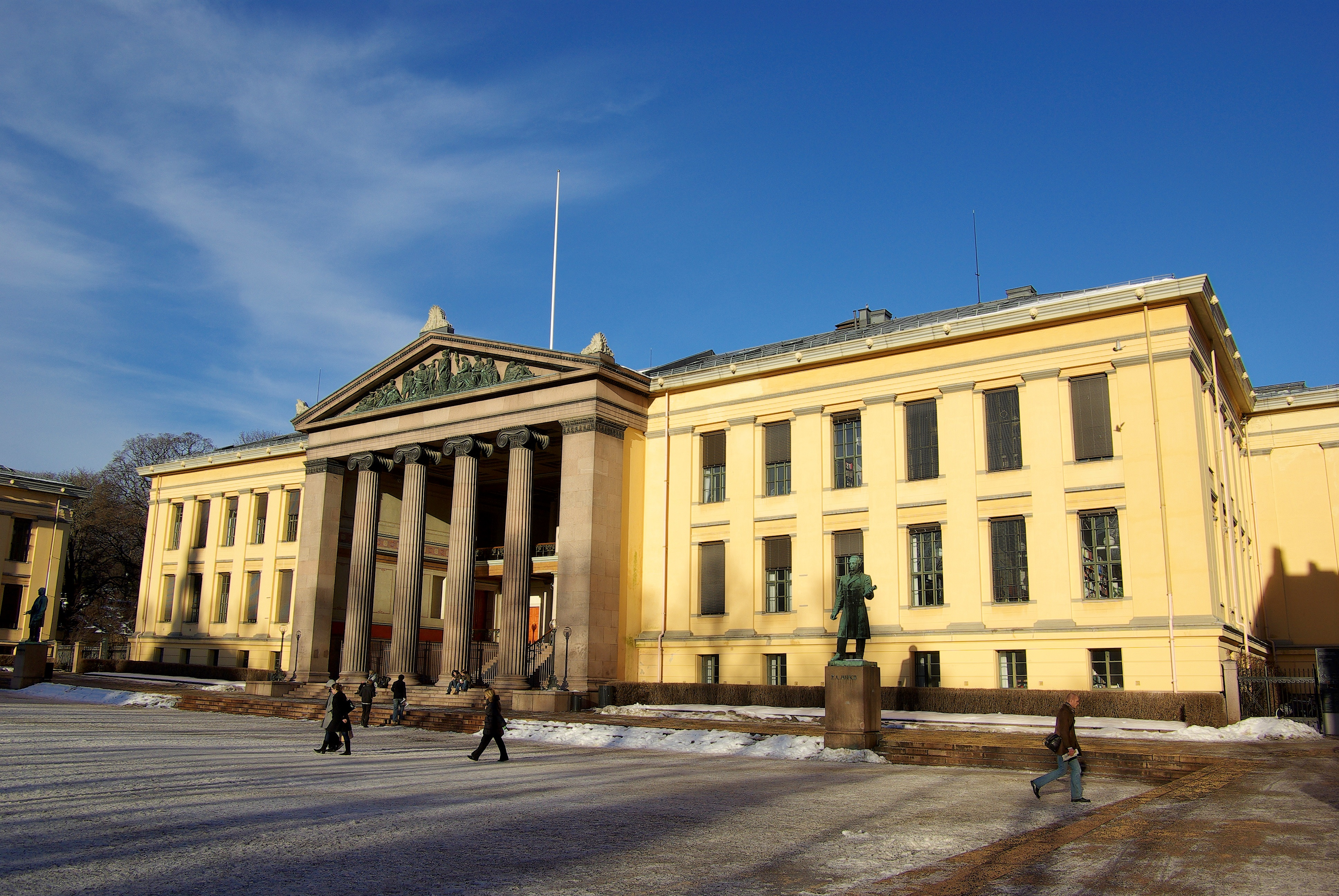

The Norwegian Centre for Human Rights (Norwegian: Norsk senter for menneskerettigheter; abbreviated SMR in Norwegian and NCHR in English) is a multidisciplinary research centre at the University of Oslo Faculty of Law. From 2001 to 2015 it was also the ICC (UN) accredited Norwegian national human rights institution.

== Directors ==
- 1987–1998: Asbjørn Eide
- 1998–2003: Nils Butenschøn
- 2004–2007: Geir Ulfstein
- 2008: Mads Andenæs
- 2009–2014: Nils Butenschøn
- 2014–2017 Inga Bostad
- 2018– Ragnhild Hennum
- 2018-2021: Gentian Zyberi
- 2022-2023 Bård Anders Andreassen
- 2024- Jakob Elster and Nina Reiners
- 2025-2027 Gentian Zyberi
