= Inga Bostad =

Norwegian philosopher, writer and educator

Inga Bostad (born 22 August 1963) is a Norwegian philosopher, writer and educator. She served as prorector of the University of Oslo from 2009 to 2013 and as director of the Norwegian Centre for Human Rights from 2014 to 2017.

== Biography ==
Bostad received an M.A. in philosophy from the University of Oslo in 1989 with her thesis: Om språk, kunnskap og tvil: en analyse av Wittgensteins Über Gewisstheit (Language, Knowledge, and Doubt — An Analysis of Wittgenstein's Über Gewissheit). In 2005, she earned a doctorate from the same institution with Tro eller tvil – en rekonstruksjon av filosofisk skeptisisme (Belief or Doubt — A Reconstruction of Philosophical Scepticism).

From 1987 until 1995, she held various editorial positions with Kritikkjournalen, J.W. Cappelens Forlag and Aventura Forlag. In 1990, she became a lecturer in philosophy at the University of Oslo, becoming Associate Professor in 2005, Vice-Rector in 2006, and Prorector from 2009 to 2013. In January 2014, she was appointed Director of the university's Norwegian Centre for Human Rights.

== Selected publications ==
Inga Bostad has contributed to over 60 publications, including the following:

- 1999: Inga Bostad and Dag Olav Hessen (editors): Et liv på mange vis: En antologi om Peter Wessel Zapffe, Pax forlag
- 2000: Hilde Bondvik and Inga Bostad: Tenkepauser: Filosofi og Refleksjon 1
- 2002: Inga Bostad and Arne Næss: Inn i Filosofien
- 2003: Hilde Bondvik and Inga Bostad. Tenkepauser: Filosofi og Vitenskapsteori
- 2004: Per Ariansen, Inga Bostad, Steinar Mathisen and Øyvind Rabbås: Exphil 1: Tekster i filosofi og vitenskapshistorie
- 2004: Per Ariansen, Inga Bostad, Steinar Mathisen and Øyvind Rabbås. Lærebok i filosofi- og vitenskapshistorie
- 2005: Inga Bostad: Tro eller tvil – en rekonstruksjon av filosofisk skeptisisme
- 2006: Inga Bostad og Tove Pettersen: Dialog og danning: det filosofiske grunnlaget for læring 2006 – ISBN 978-82-304-0022-7
- 2014: Inga Bostad & Ole Petter Ottersen. Global presence, global responsibility and the global citizen, In Aksel Braanen Sterri (ed.), Global citizen - challenges and responsibility in an interconnected world. Sense Publishers. ISBN 9789462099289. Chapter 1. pp. 1 - 3
- 2016: Inga Bostad and Halor Hanish. Freedom and Disability Rights: Dependence, Independence, and Interdependence, Metaphilosophy, DOI: 10.1111/meta.12192.
- 2016: Inga Bostad & Aled Dilwyn Fisher. Curriculum and social change in education for a sustainable future? Ecophilosophy, critical inquiry and moral dilemmas, In Zehlia Babaci-Wilhite (ed.), Human rights in language and STEM education: science, technology, engineering and mathematics. Sense Publishers. ISBN 978-94-6300-404-6. Chapter 5.
