= Majorana =

Majorana may refer to:

== Physics and computing ==
- Majorana fermion, in particle physics
- MAJORANA, a physics search for neutrinoless double-beta decay
- Majorana 1, a hardware device developed by Microsoft for use in quantum computing

== Other uses ==
- Majorana (surname), an Italian surname (includes a list of people with the name)
- Majorana Prize, for theoretical and mathematical physics

== See also ==
- Maiorana, an Italian surname
- Majorna, a residential area in Gothenburg, Sweden
- Majorna (borough), a former borough of Gothenburg Municipality, Sweden
- Maiorano (disambiguation)
