= Chetan Nayak =

American computer scientist

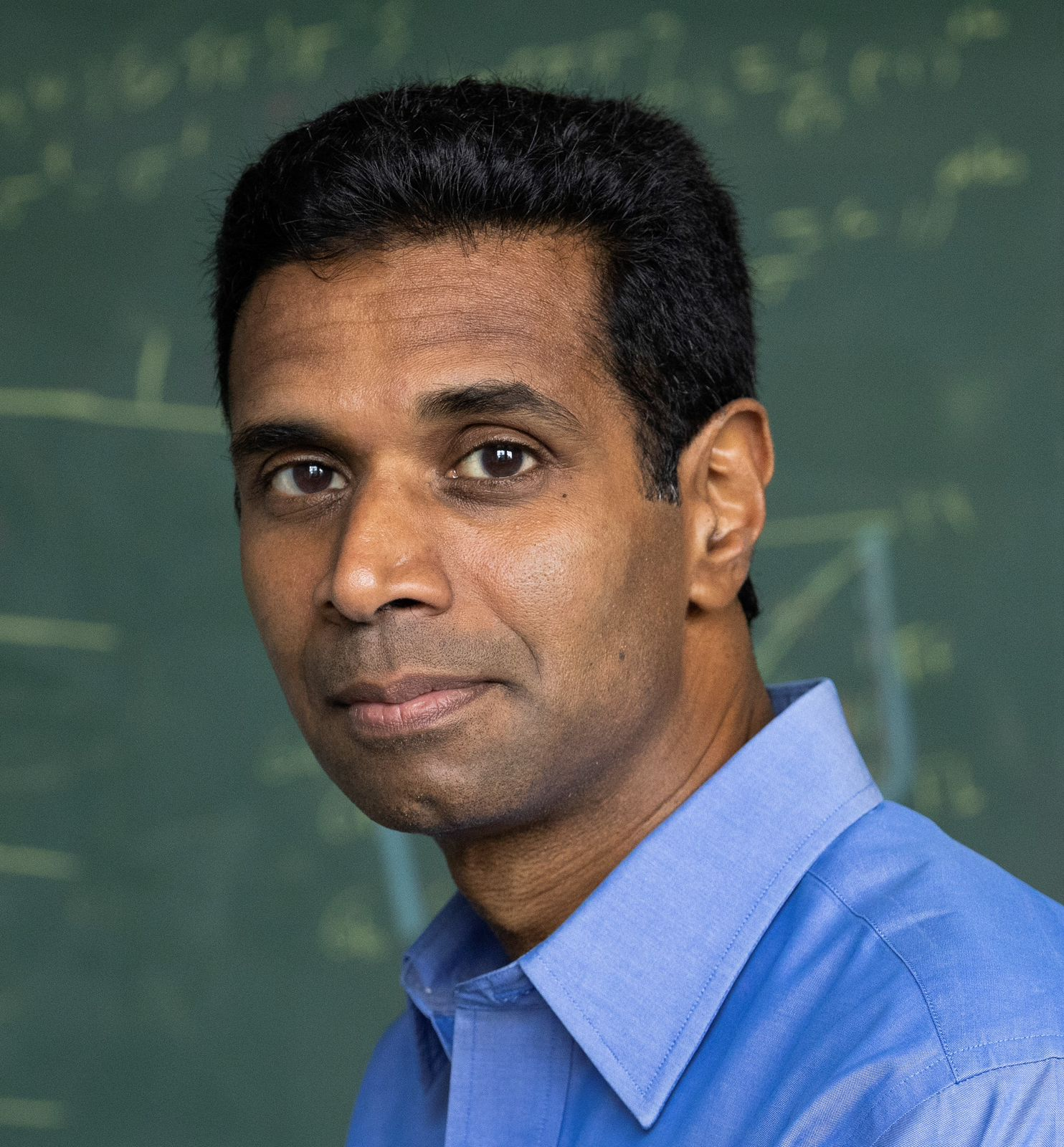
- Born: New York City, NY, United States
- Education: Princeton University; Harvard University; Stuyvesant High School
- Awards: APS Fellow (2011); Alfred P. Sloan Foundation Fellowship; NSF Early Career Award; Outstanding Young Physicist Award
- Scientific career
- Fields: Quantum computing, Computer Science
- Workplaces: Microsoft
- Thesis: Theories of the half-filled Landau level (1996)
- Doctoral advisor: Frank Wilczek

Chetan Nayak (born 1971) is an Indian-American physicist and computer scientist specializing in quantum computing. He is a professor at the University of California, Santa Barbara and a technical fellow and distinguished engineer on the Microsoft Azure Quantum hardware team. He joined Microsoft in 2005 and became director and general manager of Quantum Hardware at Microsoft Station Q at Microsoft Research in 2014.

== Education and career ==
Nayak was born in New York City in 1971. He earned a bachelor's degree from Harvard University in 1992 and a Ph.D. in physics from Princeton University in 1996. His dissertation on "Theories of the half-filled Landau level" was completed under Frank Wilczek.

In 1996, he was a post-doctoral fellow at the Institute for Theoretical Physics at the University of California, Berkeley (UCSB) and a professor of physics at the University of California, Los Angeles from 1997 to 2006.

He joined Microsoft in 2005 as a visiting researcher in Redmond, Washington, and the faculty of UCSB in 2007 where he has served as a technical fellow and professor of condensed matter theory through 2024.

Nayak has contributed to the theory of topological phases, high-temperature superconductivity, the quantum Hall effect, and phases of periodically driven quantum systems.

== Scientific work ==
In 1996, Nayak and Wilczek discovered the type of non-Abelian statistics in paired quantum Hall states associated with Majorana zero modes.

In 2005, with Michael Freedman and Sankar Das Sarma, Nayak authored a proposal for a topological qubit using the 5/2 fractional quantum Hall state as the non-Abelian topological state. In 2006 and 2008, Das Sarma, Freedman and Nayak developed theoretical proposals for topological quantum computing based on non-abelian anyons.

In 2011, Nayak, Parsa Bonderson and Victor Gurarie proved that quasiparticles in certain quantized Hall states are non-Abelian anyons, firmly establishing the mathematical foundation of these particles.

In 2016, with Dominic Else and Bela Bauer, he developed Floquet time crystals and predicted its occurrence in periodically driven systems.

Nayak also led research teams in inducing a phase of matter characterized by Majorana zero modes with low enough disorder to pass the topological gap protocol, demonstrating the viability of topological quantum computing.

In February 2025, the Microsoft Quantum team announced the creation of a chip powered by a topological architecture. The claim has been met with skepticism by many in the quantum scientific and engineering community, who question the lack of data supporting the existence of the proposed qubits. Nayak has clarified that the supporting data, namely measurements on the native operations in a measurement-based topological qubit, do exist. Results were presented to a closed group at a Station Q meeting and are anticipated at the 2025 APS March Meeting.

== Recognition ==
Nayak is a Fellow of the American Physical Society, a recipient of the Outstanding Young Physicist Award from the American Chapter of the Indian Physics Association, an Alfred P. Sloan Foundation Fellowship, and an NSF Early Career Award.
