= Elizabeth Devine =

Elizabeth Devine may refer to:

- Elizabeth Devine (writer) (born 1961), scriptwriter
- Lizzie Devine, a character from Codename: Kids Next Door
- Lizzy DeVine, musician
- Betsy Devine (born 1946), writer
