= Leo Kouwenhoven =

Dutch physicist (born 1963)

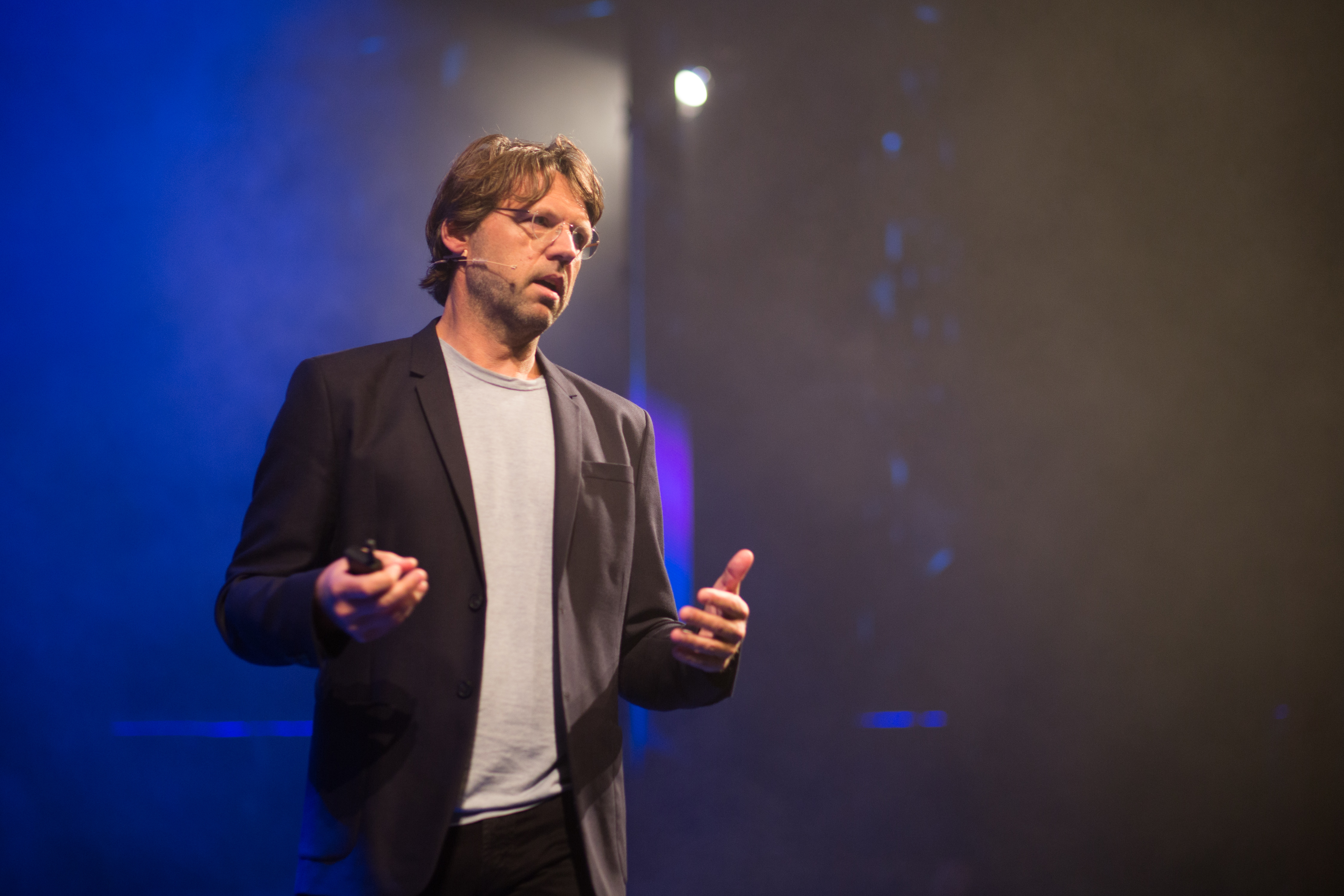
- Leo Kouwenhoven in 2016
- Born: 10 December 1963 (age 62); Pijnacker, Netherlands
- Education: TU Delft
- Awards: Spinoza Prize (2007)
- Scientific career
- Fields: Physics; Quantum computing
- Workplaces: TU Delft
- Website: qutech.nl/lab/kouwenhoven-lab/

Leo Kouwenhoven (born 10 December 1963) is a Dutch physicist known for his research on quantum computing, specifically in topological quantum computing experiments.

== Education ==
Kouwenhoven grew up in Pijnacker, a village near Delft, where his parents ran a farm. After losing the admission lottery for veterinary medicine he decided to study physics at Delft University of Technology (TU Delft).

In 1992 he received his PhD cum laude at TU Delft; his promoter was Hans Mooij.

== Career ==
In 1999 he became a professor at TU Delft. In 2007 he received the Spinoza Prize, the highest Dutch academic award. In April 2012 his TU Delft research group presented experimental results that provided potential "signatures" of Majorana fermion quasiparticles. These Majorana quasiparticles would be very stable, and therefore suitable for building a quantum computer.

In 2018 his research group claimed to have proved the definitive existence of Majorana particles in a Nature publication. However, the results could not be reproduced by other scientists, and the article had to be retracted in 2021 due to "insufficient scientific rigour". The researchers had excluded data points that contradicted their claims, with the complete data not supporting their conclusions.

Two of the Majorana research papers involving Leo Kouwenhoven's group at QuTech were retracted due to data irregularities, leading to a couple of investigations by the TU Delft's Research Integrity Committee (CWI) and the Dutch Body for Scientific Integrity (LOWI) between 2020 and 2023. (Note: CWI and the LOWI led a first investigation between 2020 and 2022. The CWI conducted a second investigation from 2022 to 2023) While Kouwenhoven was found partly negligent in one case, no scientific integrity violations were confirmed.

Kouwenhoven was reappointed as university professor at TU Delft in 2024.

== Personal life ==
Kouwenhoven has six sisters and is married to Vrije Universiteit Amsterdam professor Marleen Huysman.
