= Majorana (surname) =

Majorana is an Italian surname. Notable people with the surname include:

- Benedetto Majorana della Nicchiara (1899–1982), Italian politician
- Cristoforo Majorana (fl. c. 1480–94), Italian limner and painter
- Ettore Majorana (1906 – dis. 1938), Italian theoretical physicist
- Quirino Majorana (1871–1957), Italian experimental physicist

== See also ==
- Maiorana
- Majorana (disambiguation)
