= Palazzo Rosa, Catania =

Art nouveau palace in Catania

Coordinates: 37.50484°N 15.09667°E

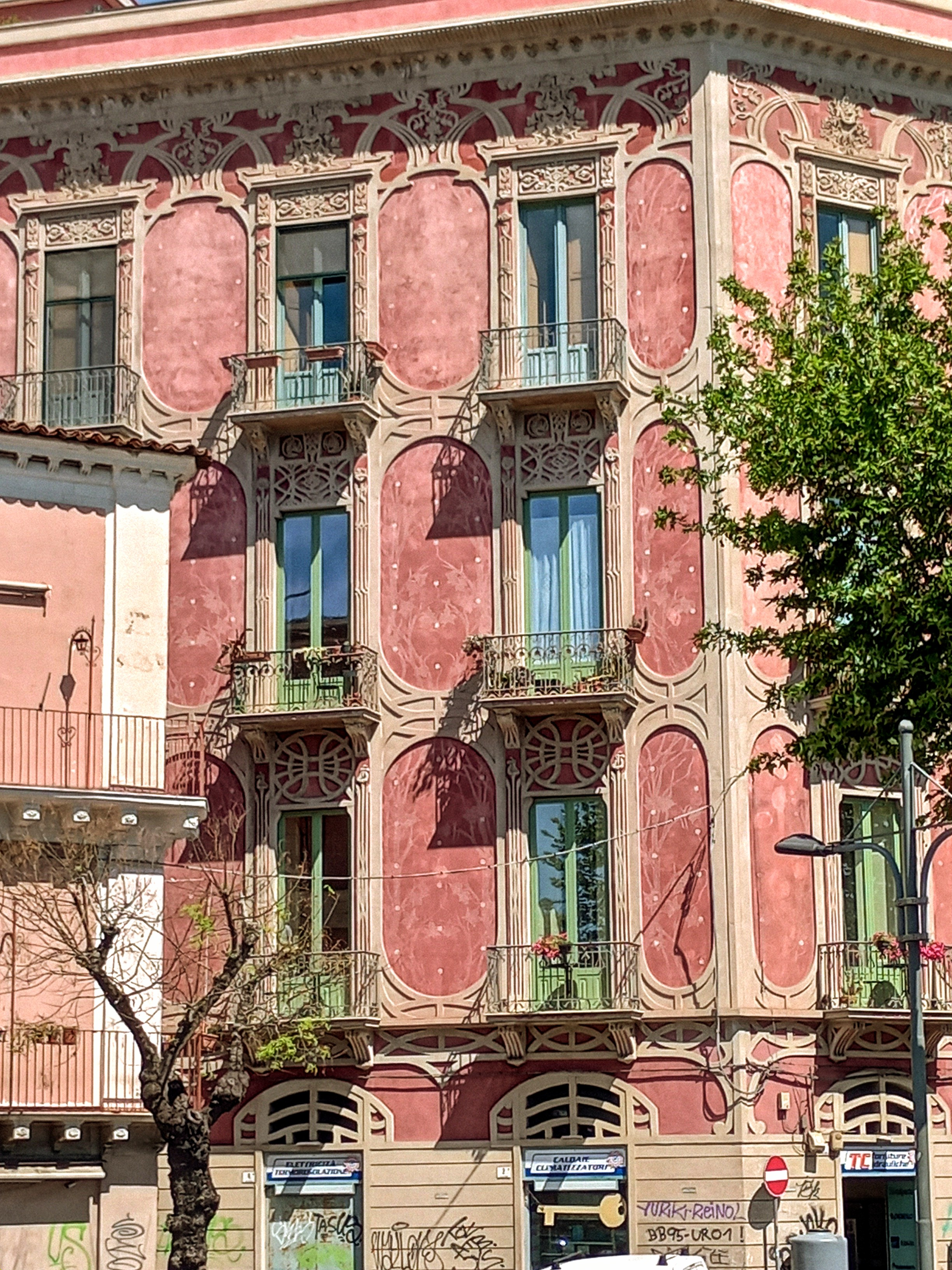
View of the palace

The Palazzo Rosa is a Liberty style apartment complex located on the seaside Via VI Aprile in the city of Catania, region of Sicily, Italy.

The rose color painted palace was erected in 1903-1905 under the direction of the architect Fabio Maiorana, father of Ettore Maiorana. The vertical lines of tall green-framed windows behind small balconies, facing the sea, are interspersed with elaborate designs and motifs.
