= John Quinn (physicist) =

American theoretical physicist

Chancellor of the University of Tennessee
- In office 1989–1992
- Preceded by: Jack E. Reese
- Succeeded by: William T. Snyder

Personal details
- Born: September 25, 1933 New York City, U.S.
- Died: October 8, 2018 (aged 85) Knoxville, Tennessee, U.S.
- Education: St. John's University; University of Maryland
- Occupation: physicist

John Joseph Quinn (September 25, 1933 – October 8, 2018) was an American theoretical physicist as well as an academic administrator; he was a former Chancellor and a member of the faculty at The University of Tennessee, Knoxville, US. He was considered to be an expert in the areas of solid-state physics and many-body theory including two dimensional Composite fermions, low-dimensional systems, quantum Hall effect and nanoscience. Quinn was also one of the first researchers to recognize that physics of ‘two-dimensional electronic systems’ needs to be treated as a professional-sub-specialty.

== Life, education and career ==
Born in New York City in 1933, John Quinn did his undergraduate studies at St. John's University where in 1954, he completed a B.S. with Summa Cum Laude. He earned his doctoral (1958) in Physics from the University of Maryland in USA. His doctoral research at Maryland was in “Self-Energy Approach to Correlations in a Degenerate Electron Gas” under the supervision of Professor R.A. Ferrell.

Starting from 1965, for nearly quarter of a century Quinn was at the Brown University in Rhode Island, US. Between 1986 and 1989 Quinn was Dean of the Faculty. Before taking up the position of the dean, from 1965 to 1989 he was in the physics department at Brown as Professor of Physics. Earlier, from 1959 to 1965 Quinn was Member of Technical Staff, at the RCA Laboratories, in Princeton, NJ.

From 1989 -1992 Quinn was the Chancellor of the University of Tennessee; where since 1992 he has held the Willis Lincoln Chair of Excellence, Professor of Physics and Professor of Engineering Science and Mechanics. This is the flagship campus of University of Tennessee system and holds a close relationship with the US Department of Energy's Oak Ridge National Laboratory (ORNL), ORNL was established at one of the original sites of the Manhattan Project and remains one of the largest nuclear facilities in the world.

== Major professional contributions and recognitions ==
Quinn was internationally recognized as one of the researchers who helped create a research specialty in condensed matter physics known as ‘two-dimensional electronic systems’. Physical properties of materials are critically dependent on how many dimensions of space that the constituents of the system can operate in; for instance, the energies and spatial distribution of quantum states are extremely sensitive to whether the system is effectively 1-d, 2-d or 3-d.

He was also instrumental in starting the International Conference on Electronic Properties of Two-Dimensional Systems EP2DS a biannual professional gathering of researchers and scientists. In 1975, the first EP2DS conference was held at Brown University, where John Quinn was physics professor, consequently he co-edited the proceedings of that conference. Quinn was chairman of the influential Solid State Sciences Committee and co-authored the book “Artificially Structured Materials” (National Academy Press, 1985). The advanced undergraduate and graduate level textbook “Solid State Physics: Principles and Modern Applications” (Springer Verlag, 2009) is co-authored by John Quinn and K.S. Yi. Although Quinn has been a university administrator, but all through he has been and active researcher and have published over 350 scientific publications. One of his early papers remains a classic. Another well recognized article is from 1982 written with one of his former doctoral students Sankar Das Sarma. In 1997 he and collaborators proposed an interesting idea that the excited states in composite fermions can be organized in groups of levels.

He died on October 8, 2018, in Knoxville.

== Selected honors and awards ==
John Quinn is a recipient of many honors, some of which includes:

- Fellow, American Physics Society, 1963
- NATO Fellow, 1971–1972
- Ford Foundation Chair in Physics, Brown University, 1985–1989
- ScD Honoris Causa, Purdue University, 1992
- Willis Lincoln Chair of Excellence, University of Tennessee, 1992
- Outstanding Graduate Alumnus Award, Physics Department, University of Maryland, 2005
- The Distinguished Alumnus Award, College of Computer, Math and Natural Sciences, University of Maryland, 2012
