= Sankar Das Sarma =

Indian-American physicist (born 1953)

- Born: 1953 (age 72–73); Kolkata, India
- Education: University of Calcutta; Brown University
- Scientific career
- Fields: Condensed matter physics Nanoscience; Quantum information Theoretical physics Statistical Physics
- Workplaces: University of Maryland, College Park
- Doctoral advisor: John Quinn

Sankar Das Sarma (/ˈʃæŋkɑːr dæʃ ˈʃɑːrmə/) is an India-born American theoretical condensed matter physicist. He has been a member of the department of physics at University of Maryland, College Park since 1980.

Das Sarma is the Richard E. Prange Chair in Physics, a distinguished university professor, a Fellow of the Joint Quantum Institute (JQI), and the director of the Condensed Matter Theory Center at the University of Maryland, College Park. As of 2025, he has mentored nearly 200 young physicists, including about 40 Ph.D. students and 150 postdoctoral researchers, more than 100 of whom have since become faculty members at universities around the world. As of 2025, Das Sarma has published over 750 papers, garnering more than 100,000 citations, mostly in collaboration with his PhD students and postdoctoral fellows. He was named a Highly Cited Researcher by Clarivate (formerly Thomson Reuters) in every annual listing from 2014 to 2022.

Das Sarma is a Fellow (in the Division of Condensed Matter Physics) of the American Physical Society, and is a member (in the Physics section, with a secondary affiliation in the Applied Physics section) of the National Academy of Sciences.

== Career ==
Das Sarma came to the United States from India as a physics graduate student in 1974 after finishing his secondary school (Hare School in Kolkata) and undergraduate education at Presidency College in Calcutta, India (now Presidency University in Kolkata) where he was born. He received his PhD in theoretical physics from Brown University in 1979 as a doctoral student of John Quinn.

In collaboration with Chetan Nayak and Michael Freedman of Microsoft Research, Das Sarma introduced the $\nu=5/2$ topological qubit in 2005, which has led to experiments in building a fault-tolerant quantum computer based on two-dimensional semiconductor structures. Das Sarma's work on graphene has led to the theoretical understanding of graphene carrier transport properties at low densities where the inhomogeneous electron-hole puddles dominate the graphene landscape. In 2006 Das Sarma with Euyheon Hwang provided the basic theory for collective modes and dielectric response in graphene and related chiral two-dimensional materials. In 2011 Das Sarma and collaborators introduced a new class of lattice tight-binding flat-band systems with nontrivial Chern numbers which belongs to the universality class of continuum quantum Hall and fractional quantum Hall systems without any external magnetic fields. Such flat-band tight-binding systems with non-trivial Chern numbers have substantially enhanced the types of possible physical systems for the realization of topological matter.

In 2010, Das Sarma and collaborators, made a prediction that Majorana fermions will be found in condensed matter, in particular, in semiconductor nanowires. This has led to considerable experimental activity, led by Microsoft Corporation, to produce a topological quantum computer.

Among Das Sarma's many other notable contributions are the theory for nonequilibrium MBE growth (often referred to as the Das Sarma-Lai-Villain equation), theories for quantum localization in incommensurate one-dimensional lattice systems manifesting mobility edges, developing the theory of ferromagnetism in diluted magnetically doped semiconductors via magnetic polaron formation and generalized percolation, calculating the appropriate fractional quantum Hall gap energies as in the Zhang-Das Sarma model, and studies on the electronic structure of semiconductor heterostructures. Das Sarma has also made contributions to the understanding of many-body collective phenomena and quasiparticle renormalization effects in electron systems, work that helped establish the theoretical framework for electron-electron and electron-phonon interactions in low-dimensional systems. This includes early theories of collective modes in two-dimensional semiconductors and coupled electron-phonon quasiparticle properties, as well as later work explaining why graphene behaves as a weakly interacting system despite its strong bare Coulomb coupling.

Das Sarma is a coauthor on several comprehensive review articles on spintronics, non-Abelian anyons and topological quantum computation, electronic transport in graphene, and Majorana fermions. Das Sarma edited a well-known book on quantum Hall effects with comprehensive contributions from the leading quantum Hall researchers.

He has been a visiting professor at many institutions during his professional career, including Technical University of Munich, IBM Thomas J. Watson Research Center, University of Hamburg, Cambridge University, University of California, Santa Barbara, University of New South Wales, Sandia National Laboratories, University of Melbourne, Kavli Institute for Theoretical Physics in Santa Barbara, Institute for Theoretical Physics in Beijing, and Microsoft Station Q Research Center.

== Books ==
- Das Sarma, Sankar; Pinczuk, Aron (2008). Perspectives in Quantum Hall Effects:: Novel Quantum Liquids in Low-Dimensional Semiconductor Structures. Wiley. ISBN 978-0-471-11216-7.
