= Jan Myrheim =

Norwegian physicist

Jan Myrheim (born 14 February 1948) is a Norwegian physicist.

He was born in Røyrvik Municipality. He took the cand.real. at the University of Oslo in 1972 and took the dr.philos. degree at the University of Trondheim in 1994. He was then appointed as a professor of theoretical physics at the Norwegian University of Science and Technology. He had then worked at the Norwegian Institute of Technology since 1985, except the years 1987 to 1990.

Together with Jon Magne Leinaas he discovered that in one and two spatial dimensions, there is a possibility of having fractional quantum statistics. This is of particular importance in two dimensions where fractional statistics particles, usually referred to as anyons, play an important role in the theory of the fractional quantum Hall effect.

The duo shared the Fridtjof Nansen Excellent Research Award in Science in 1993.

Awards
Preceded by Lars Walløe	Recipient of the Fridtjof Nansen; Excellent Research Award in Science; 1993; With: Jon Magne Leinaas	Succeeded by Arnoldus Schytte Blix
