= Fundamentals: Ten Keys to Reality =

2021 book by Frank Wilczek

- First edition
- Author: Frank Wilczek
- Language: English
- Subject: modern physics cosmology
- Publisher: Penguin Books
- Publication date: 2021
- Media type: Print
- Pages: xviii+254
- ISBN: 978-0-7352-2379-0 pbk 978-0-7532-2390-5 ebook 978-0-7352-2389-9
- OCLC: 1153517384

Fundamentals: Ten Keys to Reality (2021) is a popular science book about advanced physics by Nobel laureate Frank Wilczek.

According to the author:

This is a book about fundamental lessons we can learn from the study of the physical world. ... Here I've tried to convey the central messages of modern physics as simply as possible, while not compromising accuracy. ...
I've selected ten broad principles as my fundamentals. Each forms the theme of one chapter. In the body of each chapter, I explain and document that chapter's theme from different perspectives, and then make some informed guesses about its future developments.

== Part I. What There Is (chapters 1–5) ==
- Chapter 1. There's Plenty of Space
- Chapter 2. There's Plenty of Time
- Chapter 3. There Are Very Few Ingredients
- Chapter 4. There Are Very Few Laws
- Chapter 5. There's Plenty of Matter and Energy

== Part II. Beginnings and Ends (chapters 6–10) ==
- Chapter 6. Cosmic History is an Open Book
- Chapter 7. Complexity Emerges
- Chapter 8. There's Plenty More to See
- Chapter 9. Mysteries Remain
- Chapter 10. Complementarity Is Mind-Expanding

== Reception ==
Wilczek manages to convey advanced physics without overtaxing lay readers with complexities and knotty concepts, and does so by sticking closely to lucid accounts of the experiments and calculations scientists perform to establish how the world works, and by using straightforward but evocative descriptions of natural phenomena.

In his fifth book on the nature of physical reality, MIT physics professor Wilczek delivers a breathtaking feat of popularization, especially in the "simplified" way he presents and dissects 10 fundamental principles in fields of study ranging from cosmology to quantum mechanics. He is rigorous in distinguishing fact from speculation and science from pseudo-science, and he is comprehensive (given the limitations of his condensed approach) in describing the nature of the observations and experiments that establish those facts. The author makes some informed guesses about the future of research and discovery, and he offers a detailed appendix that expands on some of the principles discussed in the main text. While the book will be most accessible to readers with some familiarity with the science, Wilczek is a cogent writer with the ability to lend clarity to many complex, esoteric principles and theories.

According to Marcia Bartusiak's review in The Washington Post:

... There is no calculus required; this is not Physics 101. Instead, Wilczek talks about modern physics and cosmology from a more broad-brush and philosophical perspective, often linking their findings to the real world—how they affect us. ...
... A large portion of the book focuses on the particles that make up that universe and the forces they impart, not surprising given Wilczek's area of specialty. ...
... for the most part, the author strikes a nice Goldilocksian balance between simplicity and comprehension.
While this book is aimed at novices, those familiar with modern physics can still enjoy reading how a theoretical physicist thinks about the basics.

According to Nell Freudenberger's review in The New York Times:

Wilczek writes with breathtaking economy and clarity, and his pleasure in his subject is palpable. He lays out the elementary particles of matter—electrons, photons, gluons and quarks – and their strikingly short list of properties: mass, charge and spin. He then defines four principles that characterize the four basic forces in nature: electromagnetism, gravity, the strong force and the weak force. ...
... What a reader gets in "Fundamentals" is the native language of physics—mathematics—precisely translated by someone who has spent a lifetime (about a billion thoughts!) on these forces that shape our physical world.
