= Majorana 1 =

Quantum computing chip by Microsoft

Majorana 1 is a quantum computing processor developed by Microsoft. It uses topological superconductors in an attempt to enable topological quantum computing, which is designed to offer enhanced error robustness compared with conventional quantum computing hardware. It is the first device produced by Microsoft intended for use in quantum computing. It is an indium arsenide-aluminium hybrid device that admits superconductivity at low temperatures. Microsoft claims that it shows some signals of hosting boundary Majorana zero modes. The device can fit eight qubits. Majorana zero modes, if confirmed, could have potential application to making topological qubits, and eventually large-scale topological quantum computers.

In its February 2025 announcement, Microsoft claimed that the Majorana 1 represents progress in its long-running project to create a quantum computer based on topological qubits.

A follow-up device Majorana 2 was released in 2026. Both Majorana 1 and Majorana 2 have generated both excitement and skepticism within the scientific community, in the absence of definitive public evidence that the devices exhibits Majorana zero modes.

== Background ==
Quantum computing research has historically faced challenges in achieving qubit stability and scalability. Traditional qubits, such as those based on superconducting circuits or trapped ions, are highly susceptible to noise and decoherence, which can introduce errors in computations. To overcome these limitations, researchers have been exploring various approaches to building more robust and fault-tolerant quantum computers. Topological qubits, first theorized in 1997 by Alexei Kitaev and Michael Freedman, offer a promising solution by encoding quantum information in a way that is inherently protected from environmental disturbances. This protection stems from the topological properties of the system, which are resistant to local perturbations. Microsoft's approach, based on Majorana fermions in semiconductor-superconductor heterostructures, is one of several efforts to realize topological quantum computing.

== Controversy ==
Microsoft's quantum hardware has been the subject of controversy since its high-profile retracted article from Nature in 2018, and the announcement of Majorana 1 has generated both excitement and skepticism within the scientific community. A work related to Microsoft's quantum chip from Nature Communications in 2017 has been brought into question, due to alleged undisclosed data processing.

=== Claims of creating a quantum processing unit ===
In the announcement of Majorana 1, the hardware device was described as "the world's first Quantum Processing Unit (QPU) powered by a Topological Core". The hardware demonstrations currently available only demonstrate a method for readout, and do not demonstrate any quantum processing on the zero-mode. Moreover, the publicly available demonstration does not test coherence of their two-level quantum system. This is in contrast to other QPUs, which typically demonstrate both coherent quantum information and coherent logical operations on that quantum information.

=== Claims of creating a Majorana zero mode ===
In their February 2025 press release, Microsoft claimed that "The Nature paper marks peer-reviewed confirmation that Microsoft has... been able to create Majorana particles". This is in contrast to the content of the Nature paper, in which the authors state that the measurements "do not, by themselves, determine whether the low-energy states detected by interferometry are topological".

The reason for the uncertainty is the difficulty in distinguishing Majorana modes and Andreev modes. Both types of modes can exist in the sorts of devices that Microsoft is constructing. The Majorana modes are topological and could potentially be used for making a topological quantum computer, but the Andreev modes are topologically trivial and are not directly useful for making a quantum computer. The current results of Majorana 1 are completely consistent with the possibility that the device consists of Andreev modes, and does not contain any Majorana modes.

The difficulty in distinguishing between Majorana modes and other topologically trivial possibilities like Andreev modes was also the source of the high-profile Nature retraction in 2018. In this article the authors, which were affiliated with Microsoft, claimed to have conclusive evidence of Majorana zero modes, but the data was shown to be entirely consistent with Andreev modes.

=== Claims of creating a "new state of matter" ===
In their February 2025 press releases, Microsoft claimed that the Majorana 1 hardware device created "a new state of matter that previously existed only in theory." This is in contrast to the long history of experiments based on semiconducting nanowires in similar regimes to the one exhibited by the Majorana 1 chip, which should putatively be in the same state of matter. This is highlighted in the peer review file for Microsoft's Majorana 1 paper, where one reviewer describes the paper by saying that "the novelty of this manuscript does not lie in providing stronger evidence for [Majorana Zero modes], but in its methodological approach: it demonstrates that rf-parity readout 'can be done' within [a] complicated loop geometry". Despite a split among the four reviewers, with two expressing reservations and two offering conditional support, Nature published the paper, basing its decision on the innovative device architecture rather than on definitive evidence for Majorana modes.

== Topoconductors ==
Microsoft introduced the term topoconductor to describe the material on which Majorana 1 is based. In their February 2025 press release, Microsoft defined topoconductors as a "class of materials [which] enables... topological superconductivity". According to Microsoft, these materials are widely theorized to allow for the creation and manipulation of Majorana zero modes, which could then serve as the basis for topological qubits. Topological superconductors are characterized by their unique electronic band structure, which gives rise to topologically protected surface states. These surface states are robust against disorder and imperfections, making them ideal for hosting Majorana zero modes. Microsoft's topoconductor is made of indium arsenide and aluminum.

Internal whitepapers from Microsoft outline a topoconductor-based architecture which facilitates braiding processes—key operations for error-resistant qubit logic. Braiding involves exchanging the positions of Majorana zero modes in a controlled manner, which can be used to perform quantum computations. This process is inherently fault-tolerant because the topological protection of the Majorana modes makes them resistant to local disturbances.

== Follow-up devices ==
In June 2026, Microsoft announced Majorana 2, an updated version of its quantum computing chip. The company stated that the chip had been improved through the application of artificial intelligence techniques. The announcement was met with skepticism, owing to the limited data released and the lack of clarity regarding the advances made over its predecessor, Majorana 1. In response to concerns that the reported signals might be spurious, including suggestions that they could originate from a quantum dot rather than a topological state, Microsoft Director of Quantum Hardware Chetan Nayak told Nature that the team had verified that the signal was “not consistent with conventional quantum-dot behaviour”.

== See also ==
- Quantum error correction
- Topological quantum field theory
