= Maiorano =

Maiorano is a surname which may refer to:

- Laurence of Siponto (Italian: Lorenzo Maiorano) (died c. 545), Italian saint
- Nick Maiorano (born c. 1986), contestant in the American reality TV show Survivor: Kaôh Rōng
- Stefano Maiorano (born 1986), Italian footballer

== See also ==
- Majorano
- Maiorana
- Majorana (disambiguation)
