= Jon Magne Leinaas =

Norwegian theoretical physicist (born 1946)

Jon Magne Leinaas (born 11 October 1946) is a Norwegian theoretical physicist.

He was born in Oslo. He took the cand.real. at the University of Oslo in 1970 and the dr.philos. degree at the same institution in 1980. He was a fellow at Nordita, and at CERN, and held a faculty position at the University of Stavanger, before he was appointed as a professor of theoretical physics at the University of Oslo in 1989. He is a fellow of the Norwegian Academy of Science and Letters, and the Royal Swedish Academy of Sciences.

Together with Jan Myrheim he discovered that in one and two spatial dimensions, there is a possibility of having fractional quantum statistics. This is of particular importance in two dimensions where fractional statistics particles, usually referred to as anyons, play an important role in the theory of the fractional quantum Hall effect. The duo shared the Fridtjof Nansen Excellent Research Award in Science in 1993.

He resides at Gjettum, a suburb of Oslo.

Awards
Preceded by Lars Walløe	Recipient of the Fridtjof Nansen Excellent Research Award in Science; 1993 (with Jan Myrheim)	Succeeded by Arnoldus Schytte Blix
