= Anyonic Lie algebra =

Graded vector space equipped with a bilinear operator

In mathematics, an anyonic Lie algebra is a U(1) graded vector space $L$ over $\Complex$ equipped with a bilinear operator $[\cdot, \cdot] \colon L \times L \rightarrow L$ and linear maps $\varepsilon \colon L \to \Complex$ (some authors use $|\cdot| \colon L \to \Complex$) and $\Delta \colon L \to L\otimes L$ such that $\Delta X = X_i \otimes X^i$, satisfying following axioms:

- $\varepsilon([X,Y]) = \varepsilon(X)\varepsilon(Y)$
- $[X, Y]_i \otimes [X, Y]^i = [X_i, Y_j] \otimes [X^i, Y^j] e^{\frac{2\pi i}{n} \varepsilon(X^i) \varepsilon(Y_j)}$
- $X_i \otimes [X^i, Y] = X^i \otimes [X_i, Y] e^{\frac{2 \pi i}{n} \varepsilon(X_i) (2\varepsilon(Y) + \varepsilon(X^i)) }$
- $[X, [Y, Z]] = [[X_i, Y], [X^i, Z]] e^{\frac{2 \pi i}{n} \varepsilon(Y) \varepsilon(X^i)}$

for pure graded elements X, Y, and Z.
