= Ettore Majorana =

Italian physicist (born 1906, disappeared 1938)

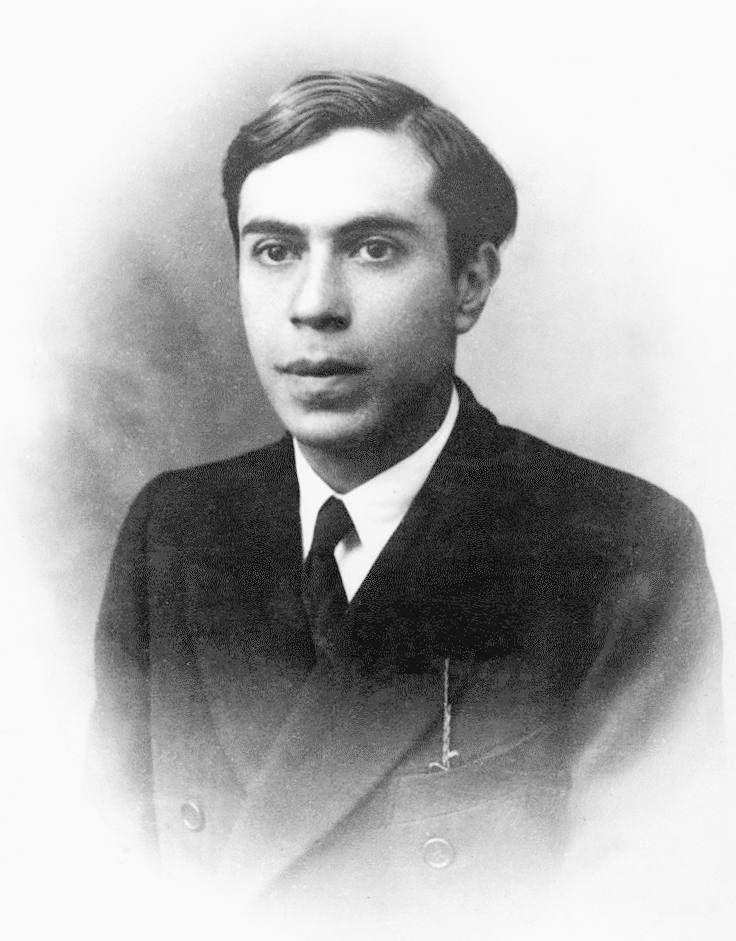
- Majorana in the 1930s
- Born: 5 August 1906; Catania, Kingdom of Italy
- Disappeared: 25 March 1938 (aged 31); Palermo, Kingdom of Italy
- Education: Sapienza University of Rome
- Known for: Exchange force; Relativistic wave equations; Majorana equation; Majorana fermion; Majorana representation
- Relatives: Quirino Majorana (uncle)
- Scientific career
- Fields: Particle physics
- Workplaces: University of Naples

Ettore Majorana (/ˌmaɪ.əˈrɑːnə/ MY-ə-RAH-nə, Italian: [ˈɛttore majoˈraːna]; 5 August 1906 – disappeared 25 March 1938) was an Italian theoretical physicist who worked on neutrino masses.

The Majorana equation, Majorana fermions, and Microsoft's device attempting to create topological qubits, Majorana 1, are named after him. In 2006, the Majorana Prize was established in his memory.

In 1938, Enrico Fermi was quoted as saying about Majorana: "There are several categories of scientists in the world; those of second or third rank do their best but never get very far. Then there is the first rank, those who make important discoveries, fundamental to scientific progress. But then there are the geniuses, like Galilei and Newton. Majorana was one of these."

He disappeared under mysterious circumstances after purchasing a ticket to travel by ship from Palermo to Naples. An investigation concluded in 2015 found evidence suggesting Majorana lived in Valencia, Venezuela, between 1955 and 1959. The case was officially closed with the conclusion that he had emigrated.

== Life and work ==
=== Early and personal life ===
Majorana was born in Catania, Sicily. Majorana's uncle Quirino Majorana was also a physicist. Mathematically gifted, Majorana began his university studies in engineering in 1923, but switched to physics in 1928 at the urging of Emilio Segrè. He was very young when he joined Enrico Fermi's team in Rome as one of the "Via Panisperna boys", who took their name from the street address of their laboratory.

Majorana was an enthusiastic and devout Catholic.

=== First published academic papers ===
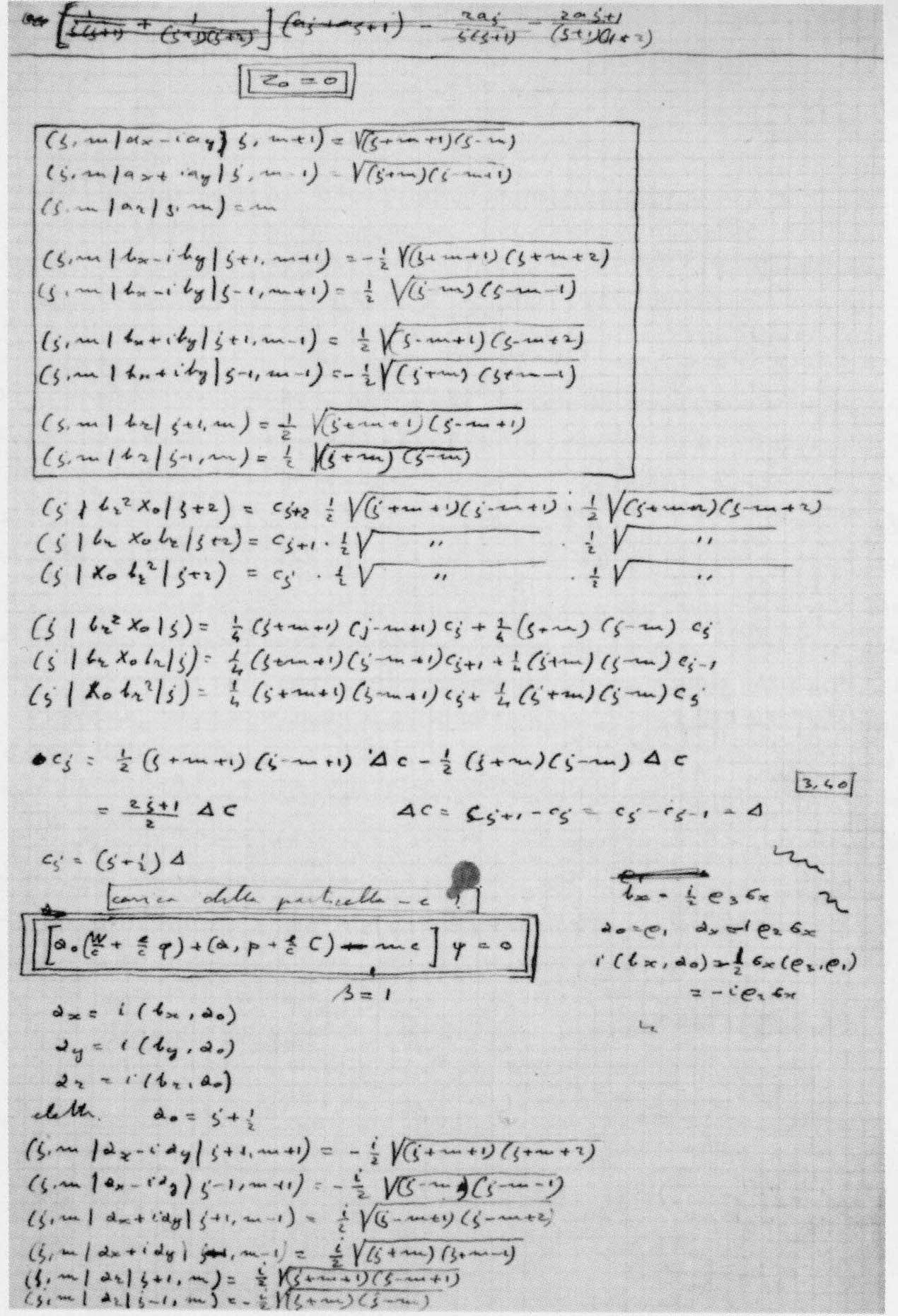
Handwritten notes for the equation in infinite components

Majorana's first papers dealt with problems in atomic spectroscopy. His first paper, published in 1928, was written when he was an undergraduate and it was coauthored by Giovanni Gentile, Jr., a junior professor at the Institute of Physics in Rome. This work was an early quantitative application to atomic spectroscopy of Fermi's statistical model of atomic structure (now known as the Thomas–Fermi model, due to its contemporaneous description by Llewellyn Thomas).

In this paper, Majorana and Gentile performed first-principles calculations within the context of this model that gave a good account of experimentally-observed core electron energies of gadolinium and uranium, and of the fine structure splitting of caesium lines observed in optical spectra. In 1931, Majorana published the first paper on the phenomenon of autoionization in atomic spectra, which he called "spontaneous ionization"; an independent paper in the same year, published by Allen Shenstone of Princeton University, called it "auto-ionization", a name first used by Pierre Auger. This name, without the hyphen, has since become the conventional term for the phenomenon.

Majorana earned his Laurea in physics at the University of Rome La Sapienza in 1929. In 1932, he published a paper in the field of atomic spectroscopy concerning the behaviour of aligned atoms in time-varying magnetic fields. This problem, also studied by I. I. Rabi and others, led to development of an important sub-branch of atomic physics, that of radio-frequency spectroscopy. In the same year, Majorana published his paper on a relativistic theory of particles with arbitrary intrinsic momentum, in which he developed and applied infinite dimensional representations of the Lorentz group, and gave a theoretical basis for the mass spectrum of elementary particles. Like most of Majorana's papers, written in Italian, it languished in relative obscurity for several decades.

Experiments in 1932 by Irène Joliot-Curie and Frédéric Joliot showed the existence of an unknown particle that they suggested was a gamma ray. Majorana was the first to interpret correctly the experiment as requiring a new particle that had a neutral charge and a mass about the same as the proton; this particle is the neutron. Fermi advised him to write an article on the topic, but Majorana did not. James Chadwick proved the existence of the neutron by experiment later that year, and he was awarded the Nobel Prize for this discovery.

Majorana was known for not seeking credit for his discoveries, considering his work to be trivial. He wrote only nine papers in his lifetime.

=== Work with Heisenberg and Bohr ===
"At Fermi's urging, Majorana left Italy early in 1933 on a grant from the National Research Council. In Leipzig, Germany, he met Werner Heisenberg. In letters he subsequently wrote to Heisenberg, Majorana revealed that he had found in him, not only a scientific colleague, but a warm personal friend."

The Nazis had come to power in Germany as Majorana arrived there. He worked on a theory of the nucleus (published in German in 1933) which, in its treatment of exchange forces, represented a further development of Heisenberg's theory of the nucleus. Majorana also travelled to Copenhagen that year, where he worked with Niels Bohr, another Nobel Prize winner, and a friend and mentor of Heisenberg.

=== Political and ideological affiliations ===
Majorana was a member of the National Fascist Party (PNF), having joined on 31 July 1933. A month before disappearing, he wrote to his mother:

Today they will give me a better room, on via Depretis, from which I will be able to see, three months from now, Hitler pass by!

In another letter from Copenhagen to a member of Enrico Fermi's group Giovannino, he expressed support for Nazi policies and applauded Hitler's sacking of civil servants from local administrations and his replacement of them with nationalist cadre:

Hitler seems to know what he is doing. Probably the fascist example is of great help to him.

Majorana recommended to his mother, who wanted to learn German, a newspaper that "became fascist overnight after Hitler imposed changes in the editorial board".

Majorana endorsed antisemitic views by suggesting that discrimination against Jews was justified as a means to "repress a socially harmful mentality," implying that such measures were necessary to make room for a new generation. Majorana wrote:

In truth, not only the Jews, but even the communists and in general all adversaries of the regime are being eliminated from social life. In sum, what the government is doing comes in response to an historical necessity: that of making room for a new generation that risks being suffocated by economic stagnation.

Professor of Italian Joseph Francese contends that Leonardo Sciascia's narrative regarding Majorana's disappearance is primarily a literary construct designed to stimulate debate over the ethical responsibilities of scientists rather than an accurate historical account. According to Francese, the story of Majorana's disappearance was a later dramatization by Sciascia that obscured the fact that Majorana was actively involved in the nationalist politics of the 1930s.

=== Illness and isolation ===
"In the fall of 1933, Majorana returned to Rome in poor health, having developed acute gastritis in Germany and apparently suffering from nervous exhaustion. Put on a strict diet, he grew reclusive and became harsh in his dealings with his family. To his mother, with whom he had previously shared a warm relationship, he had written from Germany that he would not accompany her on their customary summer vacation by the sea. Appearing at the institute less frequently, he soon was scarcely leaving his home; the promising young physicist had become a hermit. For nearly four years he shut himself off from friends and stopped publishing."

=== Final work ===
During these years, in which he published few articles, Majorana wrote many small works on geophysics, electrical engineering, mathematics, and relativity. These unpublished papers, preserved in Domus Galileiana in Pisa, have been edited by Erasmo Recami and Salvatore Esposito.

Majorana's last-published paper, in 1937, was an elaboration of a symmetrical theory of electrons and positrons. This corresponds to modern field theory methods, and predicts that the particles that, as the electron, have electric charge and obey Dirac equations, should be fermions and have distinct antiparticles. Particles without charge, such as the neutrinos, could coincide with their own antiparticles, and are called Majorana fermions. There has been speculation that at least some part of the "missing mass" in the universe, which cannot be detected except by inference from its gravitational influence, may be composed of Majorana particles.

In 1938, at the age of 31, he became a full professor of theoretical physics at the University of Naples independently of the competition rules, without needing to take an examination because of his "high fame of singular expertise reached in the field of theoretical physics".

== Disappearance ==
Reportedly, Majorana had withdrawn all of his money from his bank account prior to making a trip from Naples to Palermo. He may have traveled to Palermo hoping to visit his friend Emilio Segrè, a professor at the university there, but Segrè was in California at that time.

On the day of his disappearance, Majorana sent the following note from Palermo to Antonio Carrelli, director of the Naples Physics Institute:

Dear Carrelli,

I made a decision that has become unavoidable. There isn't a bit of selfishness in it, but I realize what trouble my sudden disappearance will cause you and the students. For this as well, I beg your forgiveness, but especially for betraying the trust, the sincere friendship, and the sympathy you gave me over the past months.

I ask you to remember me to all those I learned to know and appreciate in your Institute, especially Sciuti: I will keep a fond memory of them all at least until 11 pm tonight, possibly later too.

— E. Majorana

This was followed rapidly by a telegram from Majorana cancelling earlier travel plans. Apparently, he then bought a ticket to travel by ship from Palermo to return to Naples. He was never seen again.

=== Investigations and hypotheses ===
Italian writer Leonardo Sciascia has summarized some of the results of investigations and hypotheses about the disappearance; however, some of Sciascia's conclusions were refuted by some of Majorana's former colleagues, including E. Amaldi and E. Segrè. Recami critically examines various hypotheses about Majorana's disappearance, including those advanced by Sciascia, and presents suggestive evidence for the proposal that Majorana travelled to Argentina.

Italian philosopher Giorgio Agamben published a book in 2016 that examines the case of Majorana's disappearance.

=== Proposed explanations ===
Several proposed explanations for his disappearance include:

- Suicide, proposed by his colleagues Amaldi, Segrè, and others.
- Emigration to Argentina, proposed by Erasmo Recami and Carlo Artemi (who developed a detailed hypothetical reconstruction of Majorana's possible emigration to and life in Argentina)
- Emigration to Venezuela, Rai 3 talk show "Chi l'ha Visto?" published a statement stating that Majorana was alive between 1955 and 1959, living in Valencia, Venezuela under the surname of "Bini".
- Retirement into a monastery, proposed by Sciascia (putatively the Charterhouse of Serra San Bruno). Sciascia ruled out suicide on the grounds that Majorana was a devout Catholic. Majorana's family and his priest Monsignor Francesco Riccieri also rule out suicide, favouring the option of spiritual retreat. Sciascia believes that Majorana wanted to disappear because he foresaw that nuclear forces would lead to nuclear explosives and he wanted no part of it.
- Kidnapping or murder, by Bella, Bartocci, and others, to avoid his participation in the construction of an atomic weapon
- Becoming a beggar, by Bascone and Venturini (called the "omu cani" or "dog man" hypothesis)

=== Case reopened in 2011 and closed ===
In March 2011, Italian media reported that the Rome Attorney's Office had announced an inquiry into the statement made by a witness about meeting with Majorana in Buenos Aires in the years after World War II. On 7 June 2011 Italian media reported that the Carabinieri's Reparto Investigazioni Scientifiche (RIS) had analyzed a photograph of a man taken in Argentina in 1955, finding ten points of similarity with Majorana's face.

On 4 February 2015, the Rome Attorney's Office released a statement declaring that Majorana had been alive between 1955 and 1959, living in Valencia, Venezuela. Based upon new evidence, these last findings were the foundation for the office to declare the disappearance case officially closed, having found no criminal evidence related to his disappearance, determining that it probably was a personal choice, and a presumption that he had emigrated to Venezuela.

=== Presumed death ===
On 17 January 2025, the civil section of the Court of Rome issued a decree, dated 19 December 2024, declaring his presumed death and establishing the date of his disappearance as the official date of death.

== Commemoration of centenary ==
The year 2006 marked Majorana's centenary.

An international conference on "Ettore Majorana's legacy and the Physics of the XXI century" was held in commemoration of the centennial of Majorana's birth in Catania, 5–6 October 2006. The conference proceedings with articles of highly ranked international scientists A. Bianconi, D. Brink, N. Cabibbo, R. Casalbuoni, G. Dragoni, S. Esposito, E. Fiorini, M. Inguscio, R. W. Jackiw, L. Maiani, R. Mantegna, E. Migneco, R. Petronzio, B. Preziosi, R. Pucci, E. Recami, and Antonino Zichichi have been published by POS Proceedings of Science of SISSA, edited by Andrea Rapisarda (chairman), Paolo Castorina, Francesco Catara, Salvatore Lo Nigro, Emilio Migneco, Francesco Porto, and Emanuele Rimini.

A commemorative book of his nine collected papers, with commentary and English translations, was published by the Italian Physical Society in 2006.

Also to commemorate the centenary, the Electronic Journal of Theoretical Physics (EJTP) published a special issue of twenty articles dedicated to the modern development of Majorana's legacy. The EJTP also established a prize in his memory to mark his centenary. The Majorana Medal or Majorana Prize is an annual prize for researchers who have shown peculiar creativity, critical sense, and mathematical rigour in theoretical physics—in its broadest sense. The recipients of the 2006 Majorana Prize were Erasmo Recami (University of Bergamo and INFN) and George Sudarshan (University of Texas); of the 2007 Majorana Prize: Lee Smolin (Perimeter Institute for Theoretical Physics, Canada), Eliano Pessa (Centro Interdipartimentale di Scienze Cognitive, Università di Pavia and Dipartimento di Psicologia, Università di Pavia Piazza Botta, Italy) and Marcello Cini (Dipartimento di Fisica, Università La Sapienza, Roma, Italy).

== See also ==
- Clifford module
- Fano resonance
- I ragazzi di via Panisperna (film)
- Landau–Zener formula
- List of people who disappeared mysteriously at sea
- Majoron
