= Lars Walløe =

Norwegian academic (born 1938)

- Born: 20 May 1938 (age 88)
- Education: University of Oslo
- Scientific career
- Fields: Chemistry physiology
- Workplaces: University of Oslo

Lars Walløe (born 20 May 1938) is a Norwegian academic, chemist, physiologist, and scientific adviser to the Norwegian government. He was the head of the Norwegian Delegation to the Scientific Committee of the International Whaling Commission, and he was honored by the Japanese government for having "contributed to the promotion of Japan’s policy in the field of fisheries". From 2002 to 2008 Walløe served as the president of Academia Europaea.

== Education ==
Walløe studied medicine at the University of Oslo and has also earned a doctorate in physical chemistry. In 1961, he was awarded a B.Sc. In 1965, he earned his M.Sc. and M.D. In 1968, the university conferred his Ph.D.

== Career ==
Walløe is Professor of Physiology at the Faculty of Medicine of the University of Oslo where he had previously been a professor of applied statistics and cybernetics. He has a Ph.D. degree in physical chemistry.

He has also been a part-time research director at the Norwegian Institute of Marine Research in Bergen, Norway. He was also a part-time professor in the Department of Arctic Biology at the University of Tromsø. His research is in the field of cardiovascular control mechanisms in humans and in other large mammals, and he has developed non-invasive ultrasound instruments for such studies. He has also published studies on neuronal nets, statistical methodology, historical demography, population biology, and reproductive epidemiology.

Walløe is the scientific adviser to the Norwegian Government on Marine mammals. He has been President of the Norwegian Academy of Science and Letters, Chairman of the Norwegian Population Panel, Director of the Norwegian research program on acid rain, Chairman of the Norwegian Research Board for Environment and Development, and Chairman of the Standing Committee for Life and Environmental Sciences of the European Science Foundation.

== Affiliations ==
- Norwegian Academy of Science and Letters.
- Royal Norwegian Society of Science and Letters.
- Academia Europaea, Member (since 1999), President, 2008.
- Physiological Society (UK).
- Royal Statistical Society (UK).
- American Physiological Society (US).
- American Statistical Association (US).

== Honors ==
- 2005 – Royal Norwegian Order of St. Olav, Commander (Den Kongelige Norske St. Olavs Orden, Kommandør).
- 2009 – Order of the Rising Sun, Gold Rays with Neck Ribbon.

Awards
Preceded by Jon Bremer	Recipient of the Fridtjof Nansen Excellent Research Award in Science; 1992	Succeeded by Jon Magne Leinaas; Jan Myrheim
