= Maiorana =

Maiorana is an Italian surname. Notable people with the surname include:

- Alfonso Maiorana, Canadian filmmaker and cinematographer
- Bruno Maïorana (born 1966), French cartoonist
- Daniel Maiorana (born c. 1977), founder of Swedish gang Fucked For Life
- Giuliano Maiorana (born 1969), English footballer
- Marcello Maiorana (died 1586), Italian Roman Catholic prelate
- Mark Maiorana (born 1956), American politician

== See also ==
- Majorana (surname)
- Majorana (disambiguation)
- Maiorano (disambiguation)
