= International Conference on Electronic Properties of Two-Dimensional Systems =

The International Conference on Electronic Properties of Two-Dimensional Systems (EP2DS), is a biannual event, where over hundred scientists meet for the presentation of new developments on the special field of two-dimensional electron systems in semiconductors. Most transistors in integrated circuits have such a two-dimensional electron system inside, but also the quantum Hall effect was discovered in such a structure.

The conference series started 1975 at the Brown University in Providence, Rhode Island, United States. The next in the series will be held July 27-August 1, 2025 at Washington University in St. Louis.

== Conference list ==
- EP2DS-1 - Brown University, Providence, Rhode Island, USA (1975)
- EP2DS-2 - Berchtesgaden, Germany (1977)
- ...
- EP2DS-10 - Newport, Rhode Island, USA (1993)
- EP2DS-11 - Nottingham, England (1995)
- EP2DS-12 - Tokyo, Japan (1997)
- EP2DS-13 - Ottawa, Canada (1999)
- EP2DS-14 - Prague, Czech (2001)
- EP2DS-15 - Nara, Japan (2003)
- EP2DS-16 - Albuquerque, New Mexico, USA (2005)
- EP2DS-17 - Genova, Italy (2007)
- EP2DS-18 - Kobe, Japan (2009)
- EP2DS 19 - Tallahassee, Florida, USA (2011)
- EP2DS 20 - Wrocław, Poland (2013)
- EP2DS-21 - Sendai, Japan (2015)
- EP2DS-22 - State College, Pennsylvania, USA (2017)
- [EP2DS-23] - cancelled (2020)
- [EP2DS-24] - Toyama, Japan (2021)
- EP2DS-25 - Grenoble (2023)
