= Majorna (borough) =

Coordinates: 57.694°N 11.919°E

Majorna was a borough of Gothenburg Municipality until 2011. It was merged with Linnéstaden on 1 January 2011, forming the new borough of "Majorna-Linné".

It was composed of four districts:

- Kungsladugård
- Majorna
- Sanna
- Stigberget

== See also ==
- Boroughs and districts of Gothenburg
