= Betsy Devine =

American journalist

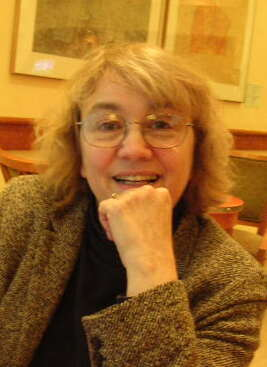
- Betsy Devine in 2006
- Born: Elizabeth Devine; 1946 (age 79–80)
- Education: Princeton University
- Occupations: author, blogger
- Notable credit(s): Longing for the Harmonies, Fantastic Realities, Absolute Zero Gravity
- Spouse: Frank Wilczek
- Children: 2
- Website: betsydevine.com/blog/

Betsy Devine (born 1946) is an American author, journalist, and blogger, with published works including Longing for the Harmonies (1988), an appreciation of modern physics with Nobel laureate Frank Wilczek, and of Absolute Zero Gravity (1993), a collection of light-hearted material about science, with biologist Joel E. Cohen. She is a Wikipedian and spoke at Wikimania in 2006.

== Biography ==
Devine earned a master's degree in engineering from Princeton University.

Devine has had, according to her self-description, "many years of immersion in geek sociology, including both Slashdot and Wikipedia flame wars". She is co-author, with husband Frank Wilczek, of Longing for the Harmonies, an appreciation of modern physics; and also, with biologist Joel E. Cohen, of Absolute Zero Gravity, a collection of science jokes, poems, and stories. About 75 pages taken from her blog were included as "a contribution" to a collection of essays written by Frank Wilczek on various aspects of physics, Fantastic Realities.

Devine spoke at Wikimania in 2006.

== Selected works ==
- Devine, Betsy; Frank Wilczek (1988). Longing for the Harmonies. W. W. Norton & Company. ISBN 978-0-393-02482-1.
- Devine, Betsy; Joel E. Cohen (December 1992). Absolute Zero Gravity: Science Jokes, Quotes and Anecdotes. Fireside. ISBN 978-0-671-74060-3.
- Devine, Betsy; Frank Wilczek (June 2006). Fantastic Realities: 49 Mind Journeys And a Trip to Stockholm. World Scientific Publishing Company. ISBN 978-981-256-649-2.
