= Arnoldus Schytte Blix =

Norwegian zoologist and Arctic explorer

- Born: 4 October 1946 (age 79); Borre, Norway
- Occupations: Zoologist; Arctic explorer

Arnoldus Schytte Blix (born 4 October 1946) is a Norwegian zoologist and Arctic explorer.

He was born in Borre to farmer Erik Gerhard Schytte Blix and nurse Marie Helle.

Schytte Blix was appointed professor at the University of Tromsø from 1980. He is particularly known for his research on thermoregulation of birds and animals in the Arctic fauna, and for studies of diving physiology of whales, seals and ducks. He is a member of the Norwegian Academy of Science and Letters, has received the Fridtjof Nansen Research Award and is a Knight, First Class of the Order of St. Olav.
