= Majorana fermion =

Fermion that is its own antiparticle

In particle physics a Majorana fermion (/maɪəˈrɑːnə/) or Majorana particle is a fermion that is its own antiparticle. They were hypothesised by Ettore Majorana in 1937. The term is sometimes used in opposition to Dirac fermion, which describes fermions that are not their own antiparticles.

With the exception of neutrinos, all of the Standard Model elementary fermions are known to behave as Dirac fermions at low energy (lower than the electroweak symmetry breaking temperature), and none are Majorana fermions. The nature of neutrinos is not settled – they may be either Dirac or Majorana fermions.

In condensed matter physics, quasiparticle excitations can appear like bound Majorana states. However, instead of a single fundamental particle, they are the collective movement of several individual particles (themselves composite) which are governed by non-Abelian statistics.

== Theory ==
The concept goes back to Majorana's suggestion in 1937 that electrically neutral spin-$\tfrac{1}{2}$ particles can be described by a real-valued wave equation (the Majorana equation), and would therefore be identical to their antiparticle, because the wave functions of particle and antiparticle are related by complex conjugation, which leaves the Majorana wave equation unchanged.

The difference between Majorana fermions and Dirac fermions can be expressed mathematically in terms of the creation and annihilation operators of second quantization: The creation operator $\gamma^{\dagger}_j$ creates a fermion in quantum state $j$ (described by a real wave function), whereas the annihilation operator $\gamma_j$ annihilates it (or, equivalently, creates the corresponding antiparticle). For a Dirac fermion the operators $\gamma^{\dagger}_j$ and $\gamma_j$ are distinct, whereas for a Majorana fermion they are identical. The ordinary fermionic annihilation and creation operators $f$ and $f^{\dagger}$ can be written in terms of two Majorana operators $\gamma_1$ and $\gamma_2$ by

$$f =  \tfrac{1}{\sqrt{2}} (\gamma_1+i\gamma_2),$$
$$f^{\dagger} =  \tfrac{1}{\sqrt{2}} (\gamma_1-i\gamma_2) ~.$$

which can be rearranged to obtain the Majorana fermion operators as

$$\gamma_1 =  \frac{f^\dagger + f}{\sqrt{2}},$$
$$\gamma_2 = i \frac{f^\dagger - f}{\sqrt{2}}.$$

With this normalization, the Majorana operators satisfy the ordinary fermionic anticommutation relations $\{\gamma_i, \gamma_j\} = \delta_{ij}$. They then have a norm of $\gamma_i^2 = \tfrac{1}{2}$ making them $\tfrac{1}{\sqrt{2}}$ times the generators of the real Clifford algebra. This is the convention used in the literature on the Sachdev–Ye–Kitaev model (SYK model), where it is often fixed implicitly through the free Euclidean propagator $G(\tau) = \langle T \gamma_i(\tau) \gamma_i(0) \rangle = \tfrac{1}{2} \operatorname{sgn}(\tau)$.

In supersymmetry models, neutralinos – superpartners of gauge bosons and Higgs bosons – are Majorana fermions.

=== Identities ===
Another common convention for the normalization of the Majorana fermion operator $\gamma$ is

$$f = \tfrac{1}{2} (\gamma_1 + i\gamma_2),$$
$$f^\dagger = \tfrac{1}{2} (\gamma_1 - i\gamma_2),$$

which can be rearranged to obtain the Majorana fermion operators as

$$\gamma_1 =  f^\dagger + f,$$
$$\gamma_2 = i (f^\dagger - f).$$

It is easy to see that $\gamma_i=\gamma_i^\dagger$ is indeed fulfilled. This convention has the advantage that the Majorana operator squares to the identity, i.e. $\gamma_i^2=(\gamma_i^\dagger)^2=1$. Using this convention, a collection of $2n$ Majorana fermions ($n$ ordinary fermions), $\gamma_i$ ($i=1,2,..,2n$) obey the following anticommutation identities

$$\{\gamma_i,\gamma_j\} = 2 \delta_{ij}$$

and

$$\sum_{ijkl} [\gamma_i A_{ij} \gamma_j, \gamma_k B_{kl} \gamma_l] = 4 \sum_{ij} \gamma_i [A,B]_{ij} \gamma_j$$

where $A$ and $B$ are antisymmetric matrices. These are identical to the commutation relations for the real Clifford algebra in $n$ dimensions ($\mathrm{Cl}( \mathbb {R}^n )$).

== Elementary particles ==
Because particles and antiparticles have opposite conserved charges, Majorana fermions have zero charge, hence among the fundamental particles, the only fermions that could be Majorana are massive neutrinos. All the other elementary fermions of the Standard Model have gauge charges, so they cannot have fundamental Majorana masses: Even the Standard Model's left-handed neutrinos and right-handed antineutrinos have non-zero weak isospin, $T_3 = \pm \tfrac{1}{2} ,$ a charge-like quantum number. However, if they exist, the so-called "Majorana neutrinos" would be truly neutral particles (assuming no other, unknown gauge charges exist).

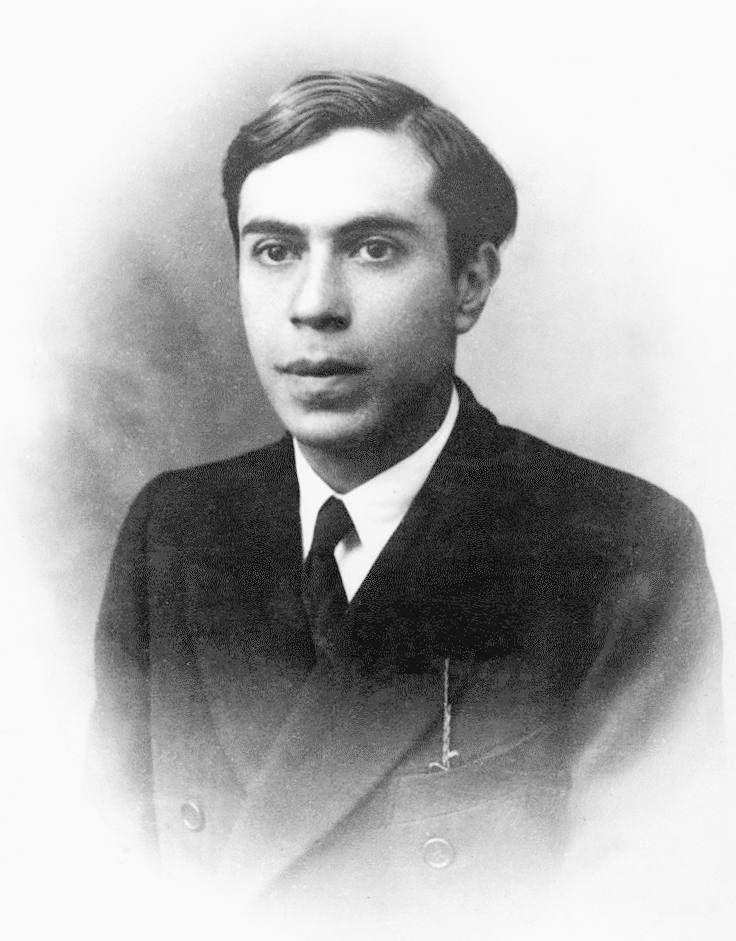
Ettore Majorana hypothesised the existence of Majorana fermions in 1937

The massive neutrino was introduced to explain neutrino oscillation but fails to fully explain the anomalously small Standard Model neutrino masses. This leads many to speculate that neutrinos could have Majorana masses. If they do, then at low energy (after electroweak symmetry breaking), by the seesaw mechanism, the neutrino fields would naturally behave as six Majorana fields, with three of them expected to have very high masses (comparable to the GUT scale) and the other three expected to have very low masses (below 1 eV). If right-handed neutrinos exist but do not have a Majorana mass, the neutrinos would instead behave as three Dirac fermions and their antiparticles with masses coming directly from the Higgs interaction, like the other Standard Model fermions.

The seesaw mechanism is appealing because it would naturally explain why the observed neutrino masses are so small. However, if the neutrinos are Majorana then they violate the conservation of lepton number and even of B − L.

Neutrinoless double beta decay has not (yet) been observed, but if it does exist, it can be viewed as two ordinary beta decay events whose resultant antineutrinos immediately annihilate each other, and is only possible if neutrinos are their own antiparticles.

The high-energy analog of the neutrinoless double beta decay process is the production of same-sign charged lepton pairs in hadron colliders; it is being searched for by both the ATLAS and CMS experiments at the Large Hadron Collider. In theories based on left–right symmetry, there is a deep connection between these processes. In the currently most-favored explanation of the smallness of neutrino mass, the seesaw mechanism, the neutrino is "naturally" a Majorana fermion.

Majorana fermions cannot possess intrinsic electric or magnetic moments, only toroidal moments. Such minimal interaction with electromagnetic fields makes them potential candidates for cold dark matter.

== Majorana bound states ==
In superconducting materials, a quasiparticle can emerge as a Majorana fermion (non-fundamental), more commonly referred to as a Bogoliubov quasiparticle in condensed matter physics. Its existence becomes possible because a quasiparticle in a superconductor is its own antiparticle.

Mathematically, the superconductor imposes electron hole "symmetry" on the quasiparticle excitations, relating the creation operator $\gamma(E)$ at energy $E$ to the annihilation operator ${\gamma^{\dagger}(-E)}$ at energy $-E$. Majorana fermions can be bound to a defect at zero energy, and then the combined objects are called Majorana bound states or Majorana zero modes. This name is more appropriate than Majorana fermion (although the distinction is not always made in the literature), because the statistics of these objects is no longer fermionic. Instead, the Majorana bound states are an example of non-abelian anyons: interchanging them changes the state of the system in a way that depends only on the order in which the exchange was performed. The non-abelian statistics that Majorana bound states possess allows them to be used as a building block for a topological quantum computer.

A quantum vortex in certain superconductors or superfluids can trap midgap states, which is one source of Majorana bound states. Shockley states at the end points of superconducting wires or line defects are an alternative, purely electrical, source. An altogether different source uses the fractional quantum Hall effect as a substitute for the superconductor.

=== Experiments in superconductivity ===
In 2008, Fu and Kane provided a groundbreaking development by theoretically predicting that Majorana bound states can appear at the interface between topological insulators and superconductors. Many proposals of a similar spirit soon followed, where it was shown that Majorana bound states can appear even without any topological insulator. An intense search to provide experimental evidence of Majorana bound states in superconductors first produced some positive results in 2012. A team from the Kavli Institute of Nanoscience at Delft University of Technology in the Netherlands reported an experiment involving indium antimonide nanowires connected to a circuit with a gold contact at one end and a slice of superconductor at the other. When exposed to a moderately strong magnetic field the apparatus showed a peak electrical conductance at zero voltage that is consistent with the formation of a pair of Majorana bound states, one at either end of the region of the nanowire in contact with the superconductor. Simultaneously, a group from Purdue University and University of Notre Dame reported observation of fractional Josephson effect (decrease of the Josephson frequency by a factor of 2) in indium antimonide nanowires connected to two superconducting contacts and subjected to a moderate magnetic field, another signature of Majorana bound states. A bound state with zero energy was soon detected by several other groups in similar hybrid devices, and fractional Josephson effect was observed in topological insulator HgTe with superconducting contacts.

The aforementioned experiments mark possible verifications of independent 2010 theoretical proposals from two groups predicting the solid state manifestation of Majorana bound states in semiconducting wires proximitized to superconductors. However, it was also pointed out that some other trivial non-topological bounded states could highly mimic the zero voltage conductance peak of a Majorana bound state. The subtle relation between those trivial bound states and Majorana bound states was reported by researchers at the Niels Bohr Institute, who can directly "watch" coalescing Andreev bound states evolving into Majorana bound states, thanks to a much cleaner semiconductor-superconductor hybrid system.

In 2014, evidence of Majorana bound states was also observed using a low-temperature scanning tunneling microscope, by scientists at Princeton University. These experiments resolved the predicted signatures of localized Majorana bound states – zero energy modes – at the ends of ferromagnetic (iron) chains on the surface of a superconductor (lead) with strong spin-orbit coupling. Follow-up experiments at lower temperatures probed these end states with higher energy resolution and showed their robustness when the chains are buried by layers of lead. Experiments with spin-polarized STM tips have also been used, in 2017, to distinguish these end modes from trivial zero energy modes that can form due to magnetic defects in a superconductor, providing important evidence (beyond zero bias peaks) for the interpretation of the zero energy mode at the end of the chains as a Majorana bound state. More experiments finding evidence for Majorana bound states in chains have been carried out with other types of magnetic chains, particularly chains manipulated atom-by-atom to make a spin helix on the surface of a superconductor.

Majorana fermions may also emerge as quasiparticles in quantum spin liquids, and were observed by researchers at the U.S. Oak Ridge National Laboratory, working in collaboration with Max Planck Institute and University of Cambridge on 4 April 2016.

Chiral Majorana fermions were claimed to be detected in 2017 by Q.L. He et al., in a quantum anomalous Hall effect/superconductor hybrid device. In this system, Majorana fermions edge mode give a rise to a $\tfrac{1}{2} \tfrac{e^{2}}{h}$ conductance edge current. Subsequent experiments by other groups, however, could not reproduce these findings. In November 2022, the article by He et al. was retracted by the editors, because "analysis of the raw and published data revealed serious irregularities and discrepancies".

On 16 August 2018, a strong evidence for the existence of Majorana bound states (or Majorana anyons) in an iron-based superconductor, which many alternative trivial explanations cannot account for, was reported by Ding's and Gao's teams at Institute of Physics, Chinese Academy of Sciences and University of Chinese Academy of Sciences, when they used scanning tunneling spectroscopy on the superconducting Dirac surface state of the iron-based superconductor. It was the first time that indications of Majorana particles were observed in the bulk of a pure substance. However, more recent experimental studies in iron-based superconductors show that topologically trivial Caroli–de Gennes–Matricon states and Yu–Shiba–Rusinov states can exhibit qualitative and quantitative features similar to those Majorana zero modes would make. In 2020 similar results were reported for a platform consisting of europium sulfide and gold films grown on vanadium.

=== Majorana bound states in quantum error correction ===
One of the causes of interest in Majorana bound states is that they could be used in quantum error correcting codes. This process is done by creating so called 'twist defects' in codes such as the toric code which carry unpaired Majorana modes. The Majoranas are then "braided" by being physically moved around each other in 2D sheets or networks of nanowires. This braiding process forms a projective representation of the braid group.

Such a realization of Majoranas would allow them to be used to store and process quantum information within a quantum computation. Though the codes typically have no Hamiltonian to provide suppression of errors, fault-tolerance would be provided by the underlying quantum error correcting code.

=== Majorana bound states in Kitaev chains ===
In February 2023 a study reported the realization of a "poor man's" Majorana that is a Majorana bound state that is not topologically protected and therefore only stable for a very small range of parameters. It was obtained in a Kitaev chain consisting of two quantum dots in a superconducting nanowire strongly coupled by normal tunneling and Andreev tunneling with the state arising when the rate of both processes match confirming a prediction of Alexei Kitaev.

=== Topological qubits ===
On 19 February 2025 Microsoft announced the "Majorana 1" processor, for use in quantum computers, claiming to feature Majorana zero modes. The work created a new class of materials called topoconductors, which use topological superconductivity to control hardware-protected topological qubits. The research paper utilized a method to determine fermion parity in Majorana zero modes in a single shot – validating a necessary ingredient for utility-scale topological quantum computation architectures based on measurement.
