= Anyon =

Type of two-dimensional quasiparticle

In physics, an anyon is a type of quasiparticle so far observed only in two-dimensional systems. In three-dimensional systems, only two kinds of elementary particles are seen: fermions and bosons. Anyons have statistical properties intermediate between fermions and bosons. In general, the operation of exchanging two identical particles, although it may cause a global phase shift, cannot affect observables. Anyons are generally classified as abelian or non-abelian. Abelian anyons, detected by two experiments in 2020, play a major role in the fractional quantum Hall effect.

== Introduction ==
The statistical mechanics of large many-body systems obeys laws described by Maxwell–Boltzmann statistics. Quantum statistics is more complicated because of the different behaviors of two different kinds of particles called fermions and bosons. In two-dimensional systems, however, there is a third kind of particle, called an anyon.

In the three-dimensional world we live in, there are only two types of particles: "fermions", which repel each other, and "bosons", which like to stick together. A commonly known fermion is the electron, which transports electricity; and a commonly known boson is the photon, which carries light. In the two-dimensional world, however, there is another type of particle, the anyon, which doesn't behave like either a fermion or a boson.

— "Finally, anyons reveal their exotic quantum properties", Aalto University press release, April 2020

In a two-dimensional world, two identical anyons change their wavefunction when they swap places in ways that cannot happen in three-dimensional physics:

... in two dimensions, exchanging identical particles twice is not equivalent to leaving them alone. The particles' wavefunction after swapping places twice may differ from the original one; particles with such unusual exchange statistics are known as anyons. By contrast, in three dimensions, exchanging particles twice cannot change their wavefunction, leaving us with only two possibilities: bosons, whose wavefunction remains the same even after a single exchange, and fermions, whose exchange only changes the sign of their wavefunction.

— Kirill Shtengel, "A home for anyon?", Nature Physics

This process of exchanging identical particles, or of circling one particle around another, is referred to as "braiding". Braiding two anyons creates a historical record of the event, as their changed wave functions record the number of braids.

Microsoft has invested in research concerning anyons as a potential basis for topological quantum computing. They may be useful in quantum computing as a form of memory. Anyons circling each other ("braiding") would encode information in a more robust way than other known potential quantum computing technologies. Most investment in quantum computing, however, is based on methods that do not use anyons.

== History ==
Like so many deep ideas in physics, the topological underpinnings of anyons can be traced back to Dirac.

— Biedenharn et al., The Ancestry of the 'Anyon'

In 1977, two theoretical physicists working at the University of Oslo, Jon Magne Leinaas and Jan Myrheim, showed that the traditional classification of particles as either fermions or bosons would not apply if they were restricted to move in only two dimensions. Hypothetical particles, being neither bosons nor fermions, would be expected to exhibit a diverse range of previously unexpected properties. In 1982, Frank Wilczek published two papers exploring the fractional statistics of quasiparticles in two dimensions, giving them the name "anyons" to indicate that the phase shift upon permutation can take any value.

Daniel Tsui and Horst Störmer discovered the fractional quantum Hall effect in 1982. The mathematics developed by Wilczek proved to be useful to Bertrand Halperin at Harvard University in explaining aspects of it. Frank Wilczek, Dan Arovas, and Robert Schrieffer verified this statement in 1985 with an explicit calculation that predicted that particles existing in these systems are in fact anyons.

== Abelian anyons ==
In quantum mechanics, and some classical stochastic systems, indistinguishable particles have the property that exchanging the states of particle i with particle j (symbolically $\psi_i\leftrightarrow\psi_j \text{ for } i \ne j$) does not lead to a measurably different many-body state.

In a quantum mechanical system, for example, a system with two indistinguishable particles, with particle 1 in state $\psi_1$ and particle 2 in state $\psi_2$, has state $\left| \psi_1\psi_2 \right\rangle$ in Dirac notation. Now suppose we exchange the states of the two particles, then the state of the system would be $\left| \psi_2\psi_1 \right\rangle$. These two states should not have a measurable difference, so they should be the same vector, up to a phase factor:

$$\left|\psi_1\psi_2\right\rangle = e^{i\theta}\left|\psi_2\psi_1\right\rangle.$$

Here, $e^{i\theta}$ is the phase factor. In space of three or more dimensions, the phase factor is $1$ or $-1$. Thus, elementary particles are either fermions, whose phase factor is $-1$, or bosons, whose phase factor is $1$. These two types have different statistical behaviour. Fermions obey Fermi–Dirac statistics, while bosons obey Bose–Einstein statistics. In particular, the phase factor is why fermions obey the Pauli exclusion principle: If two fermions are in the same state, then we have

$$\left|\psi\psi\right\rangle = -\left|\psi\psi\right\rangle.$$

The state vector must be zero, which means it is not normalizable, thus it is unphysical.

In two-dimensional systems, however, quasiparticles can be observed that obey statistics ranging continuously between Fermi–Dirac and Bose–Einstein statistics, as was first shown by Jon Magne Leinaas and Jan Myrheim of the University of Oslo in 1977. In the case of two particles this can be expressed as

$$\left|\psi_1\psi_2\right\rangle = e^{i\theta}\left|\psi_2\psi_1\right\rangle,$$

where $e^{i\theta}$ can be other values than just $-1$ or $1$. There is a slight abuse of notation in this shorthand expression, as in reality this wave function can be and usually is multi-valued. This expression actually means that when particle 1 and particle 2 are interchanged in a process where each of them makes a counterclockwise half-revolution about the other, the two-particle system returns to its original quantum wave function except multiplied by the complex unit-norm phase factor e^{iθ}. Conversely, a clockwise half-revolution results in multiplying the wave function by e^{−iθ}. Such a theory obviously only makes sense in two dimensions, where clockwise and counterclockwise are clearly defined directions.

In the case θ = π we recover the Fermi–Dirac statistics (e^{iπ} = −1) and in the case θ = 0 (or θ = 2π) the Bose–Einstein statistics (e^{2πi} = 1). In between we have something different. Frank Wilczek in 1982 explored the behavior of such quasiparticles and coined the term "anyon" to describe them, because they can have any phase when particles are interchanged. Unlike bosons and fermions, anyons have the peculiar property that when they are interchanged twice in the same way (e.g. if anyon 1 and anyon 2 were revolved counterclockwise by half revolution about each other to switch places, and then they were revolved counterclockwise by half revolution about each other again to go back to their original places), the wave function is not necessarily the same but rather generally multiplied by some complex phase (by e^{2iθ} in this example).

We may also use θ = 2πs with particle spin quantum number s, with s being integer for bosons, half-integer for fermions, so that

$$e^{i\theta} = e^{2i \pi s} = (-1)^{2s},$$

or

$$|\psi_1 \psi_2\rangle = (-1)^{2s} |\psi_2 \psi_1\rangle.$$

At an edge, fractional quantum Hall effect anyons are confined to move in one space dimension. Mathematical models of one-dimensional anyons provide a base of the commutation relations shown above.

In a three-dimensional position space, the fermion and boson statistics operators (−1 and +1 respectively) are just 1-dimensional representations of the permutation group (S_{N} of N indistinguishable particles) acting on the space of wave functions. In the same way, in two-dimensional position space, the abelian anyonic statistics operators (e^{iθ}) are just 1-dimensional representations of the braid group (B_{N} of N indistinguishable particles) acting on the space of wave functions. Non-abelian anyonic statistics are higher-dimensional representations of the braid group. Anyonic statistics must not be confused with parastatistics, which describes statistics of particles whose wavefunctions are higher-dimensional representations of the permutation group.

=== Topological equivalence ===
The fact that the homotopy classes of paths (i.e. notion of equivalence on braids) are relevant hints at a more subtle insight. It arises from the Feynman path integral, in which all paths from an initial to final point in spacetime contribute with an appropriate phase factor. The Feynman path integral can be motivated from expanding the propagator using a method called time-slicing, in which time is discretized.

In non-homotopic paths, one cannot get from any point at one time slice to any other point at the next time slice. This means that we can consider homotopic equivalence class of paths to have different weighting factors.

So it can be seen that the topological notion of equivalence comes from a study of the Feynman path integral.

For a more transparent way of seeing that the homotopic notion of equivalence is the "right" one to use, see Aharonov–Bohm effect.

=== Experiment ===
Laughlin quasiparticle interferometer scanning electron micrograph of a semiconductor device. The four light-grey regions are Au/Ti gates of undepleted electrons; the blue curves are the edge channels from the equipotentials of these undepleted electrons. The dark-grey curves are etched trenches depleted of electrons, the blue dots are the tunneling junctions, the yellow dots are Ohmic contacts. The electrons in the device are confined to a 2d plane.

In 2020, two teams of scientists (one in Paris led by Gwendal Fève, the other at Purdue led by Michael Manfra) announced new experimental evidence for the existence of anyons. Both experiments were featured in Discover Magazine's 2020 annual "state of science" issue.

In April, 2020, researchers from the École normale supérieure (Paris) and the Centre for Nanosciences and Nanotechnologies (C2N) reported results from a tiny "particle collider" for anyons. They detected properties that matched predictions by theory for anyons.

In July, 2020, scientists at Purdue University detected anyons using a different setup. The team's interferometer routes the electrons through a specific maze-like etched nanostructure made of gallium arsenide and aluminium gallium arsenide. "In the case of our anyons the phase generated by braiding was 2π/3", he said. "That's different than what's been seen in nature before."

As of 2023, this remains an active area of research; using a superconducting processor, Google Quantum AI reported on the first braiding of non-Abelian anyon-like particles in an arXiv article by Andersen et al. in October 2022, later published in Nature. In an arXiv article released in May 2023, Quantinuum reported on non-abelian braiding using a trapped-ion processor.

In May, 2025, researchers at the University of Innsbruck have observed anyons in a one-dimensional quantum system.

In 2026, Manfra and Fève received the Oliver E. Buckley Prize in condensed matter for their experiments on anyons.

== Non-abelian anyons ==
Unsolved problem in physics
Is topological order stable at non-zero temperature?
More unsolved problems in physics

In 1988, Jürg Fröhlich showed that it was valid under the spin–statistics theorem for the particle exchange to be monoidal (non-abelian statistics). In particular, this can be achieved when the system exhibits some degeneracy, so that multiple distinct states of the system have the same configuration of particles. Then an exchange of particles can not only contribute a phase change, but also can send the system into a different state with the same particle configuration. Particle exchange then corresponds to a linear transformation on this subspace of degenerate states. When there is no degeneracy, this subspace is one-dimensional and so all such linear transformations commute (because they are just multiplications by a phase factor). When there is degeneracy and this subspace has higher dimension, then these linear transformations need not commute (just as matrix multiplication does not).

Gregory Moore, Nicholas Read, and Xiao-Gang Wen pointed out that non-Abelian statistics can be realized in the fractional quantum Hall effect (FQHE). While at first non-abelian anyons were generally considered a mathematical curiosity, physicists began pushing toward their discovery when Alexei Kitaev showed that non-abelian anyons could be used to construct a topological quantum computer. As of 2012, no experiment has conclusively demonstrated the existence of non-abelian anyons although promising hints are emerging in the study of the ν = 5/2 FQHE state. Experimental evidence of non-abelian anyons, although not yet conclusive and currently contested, was presented in October, 2013. Recent works claim the creation of non-abelian topological order and anyons on a trapped-ion processor and demonstration of non-abelian braiding of graph vertices in a superconducting processor.

== Fusion of anyons ==
In much the same way that two fermions (e.g. both of spin 1/2) can be looked at together as a composite boson (with total spin in a superposition of 0 and 1), two or more anyons together make up a composite anyon (possibly a boson or fermion). The composite anyon is said to be the result of the fusion of its components.

If $N$ identical abelian anyons each with individual statistics $\alpha$ (that is, the system picks up a phase $e^{i \alpha}$ when two individual anyons undergo adiabatic counterclockwise exchange) all fuse together, they together have statistics $N^2 \alpha$. This can be seen by noting that upon counterclockwise rotation of two composite anyons about each other, there are $N^2$ pairs of individual anyons (one in the first composite anyon, one in the second composite anyon) that each contribute a phase $e^{i \alpha}$. An analogous analysis applies to the fusion of non-identical abelian anyons. The statistics of the composite anyon is uniquely determined by the statistics of its components.

Non-abelian anyons have more complicated fusion relations. As a rule, in a system with non-abelian anyons, there is a composite particle whose statistics label is not uniquely determined by the statistics labels of its components, but rather exists as a quantum superposition (this is completely analogous to how two fermions known to have spin 1/2 are together in quantum superposition of total spin 1 and 0). If the overall statistics of the fusion of all of several anyons is known, there is still ambiguity in the fusion of some subsets of those anyons, and each possibility is a unique quantum state. These multiple states provide a Hilbert space on which quantum computation can be done.

== Topological basis ==
Anticlockwise rotation

Clockwise rotation

Exchange of two particles in 2+1 spacetime by rotation. The rotations are inequivalent, since one cannot be deformed into the other (without the worldlines leaving the plane, an impossibility in 2d space).

In more than two dimensions, the spin–statistics theorem states that any multiparticle state of indistinguishable particles has to obey either Bose–Einstein or Fermi–Dirac statistics. For any d > 2, the Lie groups SO(d,1) (which generalizes the Lorentz group) and Poincaré(d,1) have Z_{2} as their first homotopy group. Because the cyclic group Z_{2} is composed of two elements, only two possibilities remain. (The details are more involved than that, but this is the crucial point.)

The situation changes in two dimensions. Here the first homotopy group of SO(2,1), and also Poincaré(2,1), is Z (infinite cyclic). This means that Spin(2,1) is not the universal cover: it is not simply connected. In detail, there are projective representations of the special orthogonal group SO(2,1) which do not arise from linear representations of SO(2,1), or of its double cover, the spin group Spin(2,1). Anyons are evenly complementary representations of spin polarization by a charged particle.

This concept also applies to nonrelativistic systems. The relevant part here is that the spatial rotation group SO(2) has an infinite first homotopy group.

This fact is also related to the braid groups well known in knot theory. The relation can be understood when one considers the fact that in two dimensions the group of permutations of two particles is no longer the symmetric group S_{2} (with two elements) but rather the braid group B_{2} (with an infinite number of elements). The essential point is that one braid can wind around the other one, an operation that can be performed infinitely often, and clockwise as well as counterclockwise.

A very different approach to the stability-decoherence problem in quantum computing is to create a topological quantum computer with anyons, quasi-particles used as threads and relying on braid theory to form stable quantum logic gates.

== Generalization to higher dimensions ==
Fractionalized excitations as point particles can be bosons, fermions or anyons in 2+1 spacetime dimensions. It is known that point particles can be only either bosons or fermions in 3+1 and higher spacetime dimensions. However, the loop- (or string-) or membrane-like excitations are extended objects that can have fractionalized statistics.

Current research shows that the loop- and string-like excitations exist for topological orders in the 3+1 dimensional spacetime, and their multi-loop/string-braiding statistics are the key signatures for identifying 3+1‑dimensional topological orders. The multi-loop/string-braiding statistics of 3+1‑dimensional topological orders can be captured by the link invariants of particular topological quantum field theories in 4 spacetime dimensions. Explained in a colloquial manner, the extended objects (loop, string, or membrane, etc.) can be potentially anyonic in 3+1 and higher spacetime dimensions in the long-range entangled systems.

== See also ==
- Anyonic Lie algebra – Graded vector space equipped with a bilinear operator
- Flux tube – Tube-like region of space with constant magnet flux along its length
- Ginzburg–Landau theory – Superconductivity theory
- Husimi Q representation – Computational physics simulation tool
- Josephson effect – Quantum physical phenomenon
- Macroscopic quantum phenomena – Macroscopic processes showing quantum behavior
- Magnetic domain – Region of a magnetic material in which the magnetization has uniform direction
- Magnetic flux quantum – Quantized unit of magnetic flux
- Meissner effect – Expulsion of a magnetic field from a superconductor
- Plekton – Possible statistical behavior of particles in quantum statistical mechanics
- Quantum vortex – Quantized flux circulation of some physical quantity
- Random matrix – Matrix-valued random variable
- Topological defect – Topologically stable solution of a partial differential equation
- Topological quantum computing – Type of quantum computer
