= List of University of Oslo people =

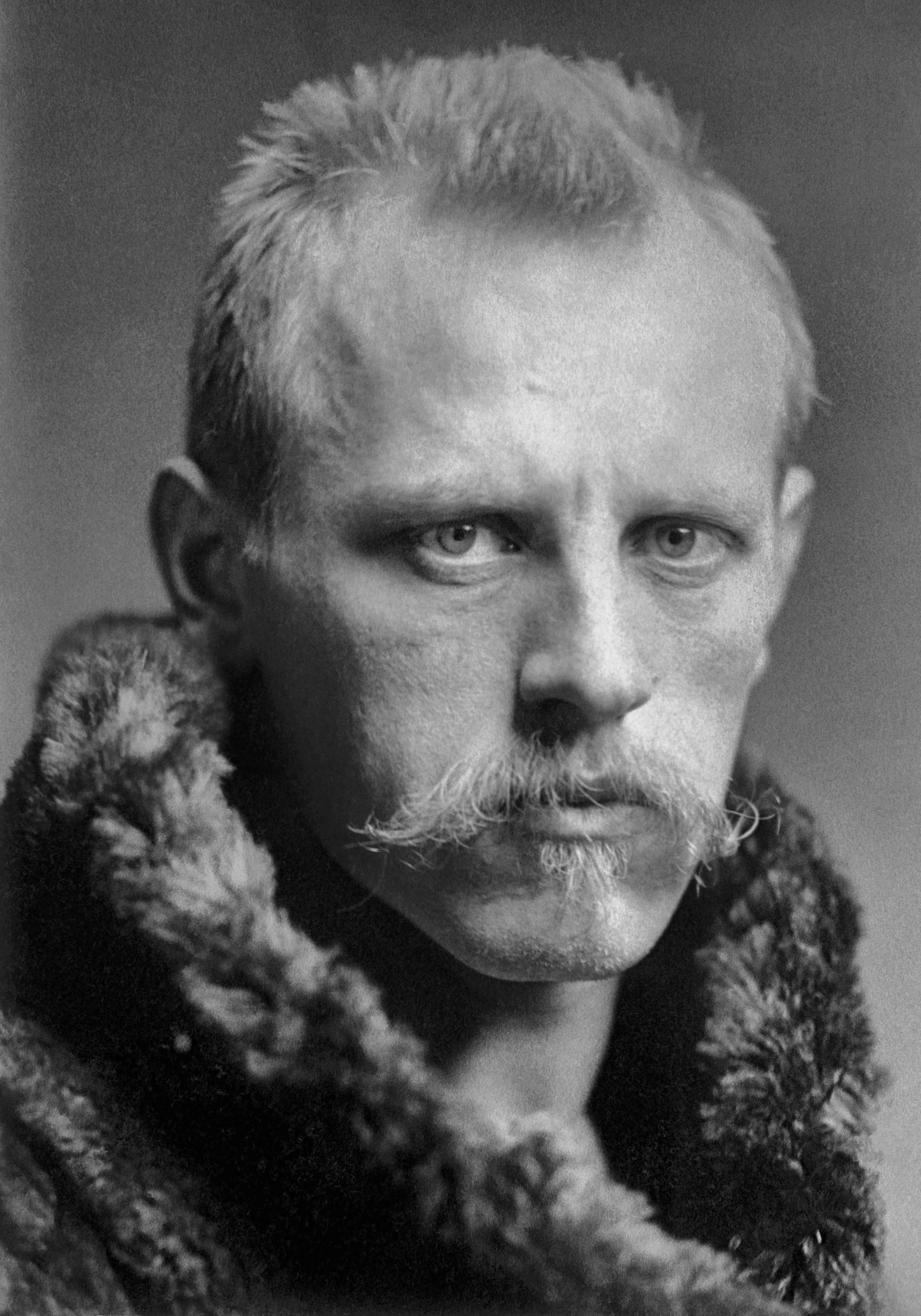
Fridtjof Nansen was Professor of Zoology, but was internationally better known as an explorer and humanitarian, served as the League of Nations' High Commissioner for Refugees, and was awarded the Nobel Peace Prize. He was elected as rector of the university in 1919, but never took office.

The list of University of Oslo people includes notable academics and alumni affiliated with the University of Oslo (before 1939 the Royal Frederick University). The University of Oslo is Norway's oldest, and was its only university until 1946; hence its academics and alumni include a large number of the country's prominent academic and public figures.

== Academics ==
Prior to 1990, all (full) Professors were appointed by the King-in-Council.

=== Biology ===
- Fridtjof Nansen, appointed to a chair in zoology, 1897; in 1908 the chair was changed to a personal professorship in oceanography
- Michael Sars
- Nils Christian Stenseth

=== Economists ===
- Ragnar Frisch
- Trygve Haavelmo

=== Chemistry ===
- Odd Hassel
- Cato Maximilian Guldberg, pioneer in physical chemistry
- Peter Waage

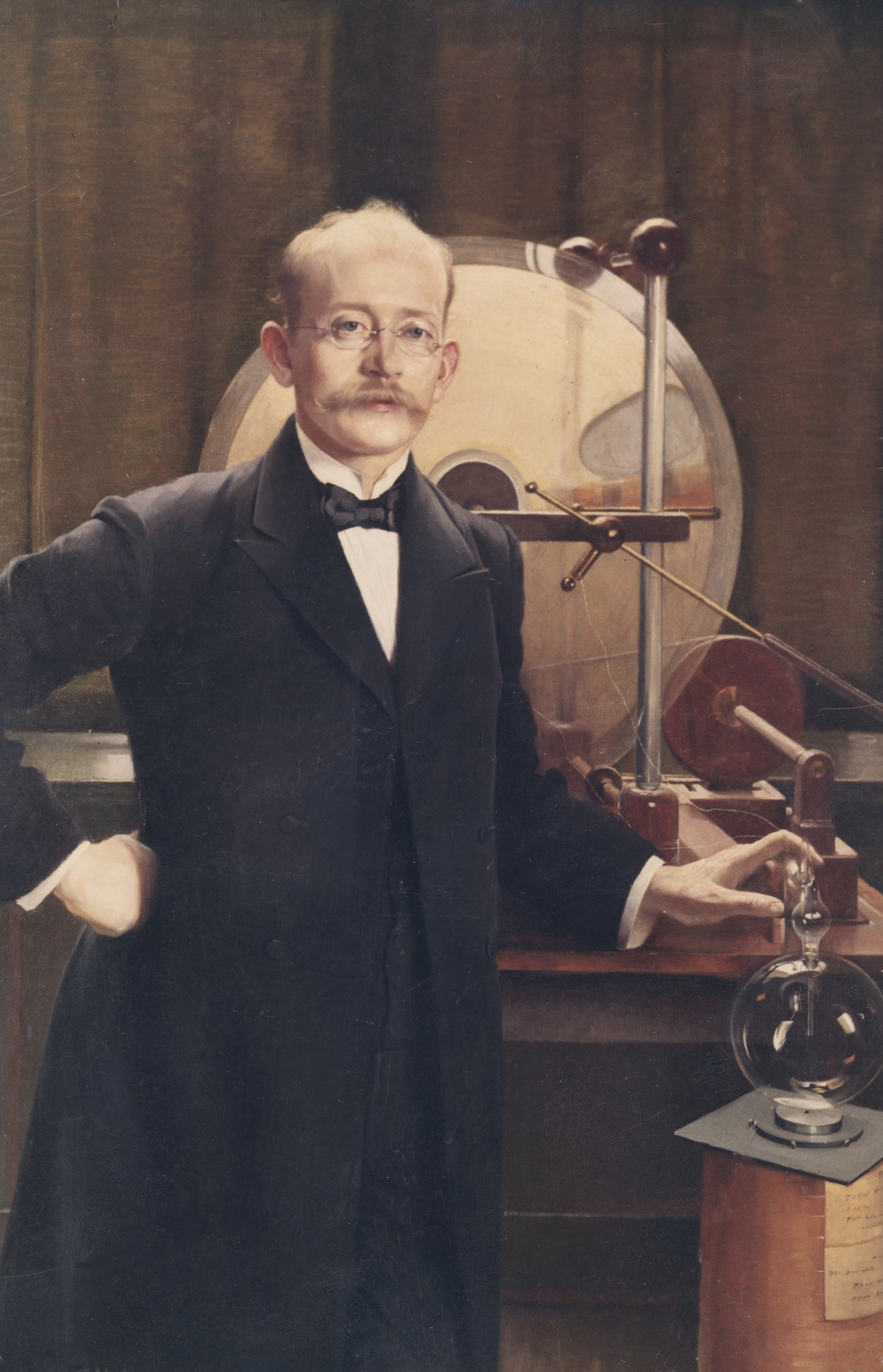
Kristian Birkeland invented the electromagnetic cannon and the Birkeland–Eyde process of fixing nitrogen from the air. Birkeland was nominated for the Nobel Prize seven times.

=== Physics ===
- Kristian Birkeland, invented the Birkeland-Eyde Process and nominated for the Nobel Prize seven times.
- Ivar Giaever

=== Historians ===
- Francis Bull
- Halvdan Koht
- Geir Lundestad
- Mikael Males
- Peter Andreas Munch
- Arnved Nedkvitne
- Jens Arup Seip
- Francis Sejersted, professor of social and economic history; chairman of the Norwegian Nobel Committee

=== Law ===
- Johannes Andenæs, Professor of Jurisprudence, Rector of the university
- Mads H. Andenæs
- Jon Bing
- Anders Bratholm
- Sjur Brækhus
- Kirsti Strøm Bull
- Frede Castberg, Professor of Law, Rector of the university
- Tove Stang Dahl, pioneer of women's law
- Torstein Eckhoff
- Aage Thor Falkanger
- Carl August Fleischer
- Francis Hagerup
- Claus Winter Hjelm, Professor of Law, subsequently Supreme Court judge
- Peter Lødrup
- Knut Selmer
- Carsten Smith, Professor of Law, subsequently Chief Justice of the Supreme Court
- Eivind Smith
- Lucy Smith
- Tone Sverdrup
- Bredo Henrik von Munthe af Morgenstierne, Professor of Law, Rector of the university
- Frederik Zimmer

=== Mathematics ===
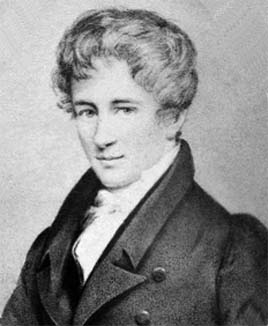
Niels Henrik Abel made pioneering contributions in a variety of fields. The Abel Prize in mathematics, originally proposed in 1899 to complement the Nobel Prizes, is named in his honour.

- Niels Henrik Abel, the Abel Prize in mathematics is named in his honour
- Carl Anton Bjerknes
- Sophus Lie, pioneer in abstract algebra; largely created the theory of continuous symmetry
- Peter Ludwig Mejdell Sylow
- Carl Størmer
- Elling Holst
- Viggo Brun
- Axel Thue
- Alf Victor Guldberg
- Richard Birkeland
- Thoralf Skolem
- Ralph Tambs-Lyche
- Øystein Ore, was also Sterling Professor of Mathematics at Yale University
- Ingebrigt Johansson
- Wilhelm Ljunggren
- Henrik Selberg
- Atle Selberg, winner of the Fields Medal
- Ernst Sejersted Selmer
- Erik Alfsen
- Arnfinn Laudal
- Erling Størmer
- Bernt Øksendal
- Ola Bratteli
- Ragni Piene
- Geir Ellingsrud
- Ragnar Winther
- John Grue
- Arne Sletsjøe

=== Medicine ===
- Mahmood Amiry-Moghaddam
- Kåre Berg
- Carl Wilhelm Boeck
- Christian Peder Bianco Boeck
- Cæsar Peter Møller Boeck
- Per Brandtzæg
- Per Alf Brodal
- Øyvind S. Bruland
- Niels Christian Gauslaa Danbolt
- Per Fugelli
- Ivar Asbjørn Følling
- Astrid Nøklebye Heiberg
- Hjalmar Heiberg
- Sverre Dick Henriksen
- Frederik Holst
- Torstein Hovig
- Ragnvald Ingebrigtsen
- Anton Jervell
- Leiv Kreyberg
- Einar Kringlen
- Gabriel Langfeldt
- Øivind Larsen
- Otto Lous Mohr
- G.H. Monrad-Krohn
- Sjur Olsnes
- Ole Petter Ottersen
- Jan Ivar Pedersen
- Alexander Pihl
- Edvard Poulsson
- Nils Retterstøl
- Torleiv Ole Rognum
- Bent Rolstad
- Ola Didrik Saugstad
- Carl Schiøtz
- Carl Semb
- Michael Skjelderup
- Jon Storm-Mathisen
- Axel Strøm
- Theodor Thjøtta
- Magnus Andreas Thulstrup
- Hans Jacob Ustvedt
- Guro Valen
- Lars Walløe
- Lars Weisæth

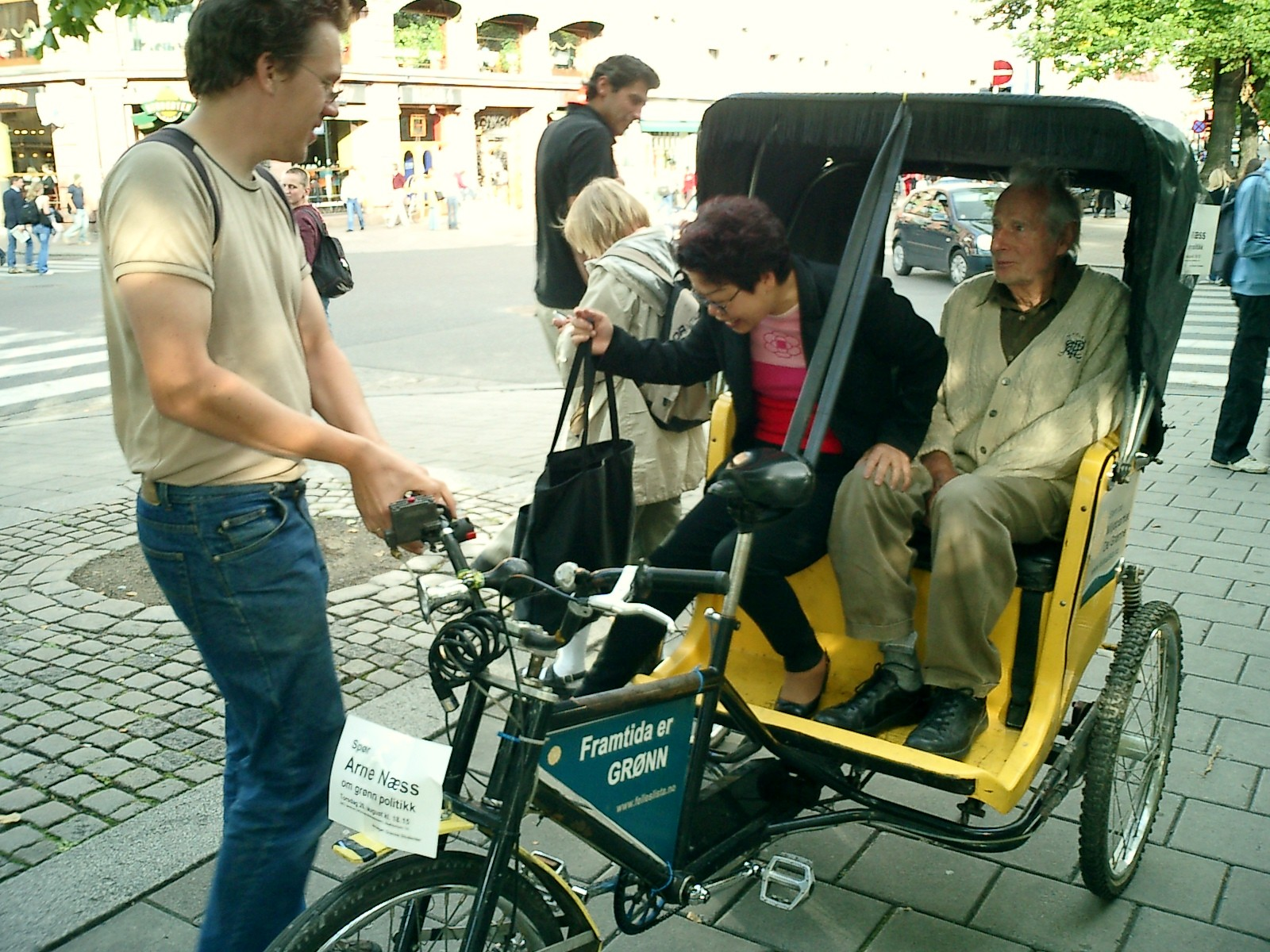
Arne Næss, founder of deep ecology, served as a Professor of Philosophy 1939–1970.

=== Philosophers ===
- Arne Næss, philosopher

=== Political scientists ===
- Bernt Hagtvet
- Janne Haaland Matlary, Professor of Political Science
- Hanne Marthe Narud
- Iver B. Neumann, Professor of Russian Studies
- Trond Nordby
- Hege Skjeie
- Thomas Christian Wyller

=== Science ===
- Trude Storelvmo

=== Sociologists and criminologists ===
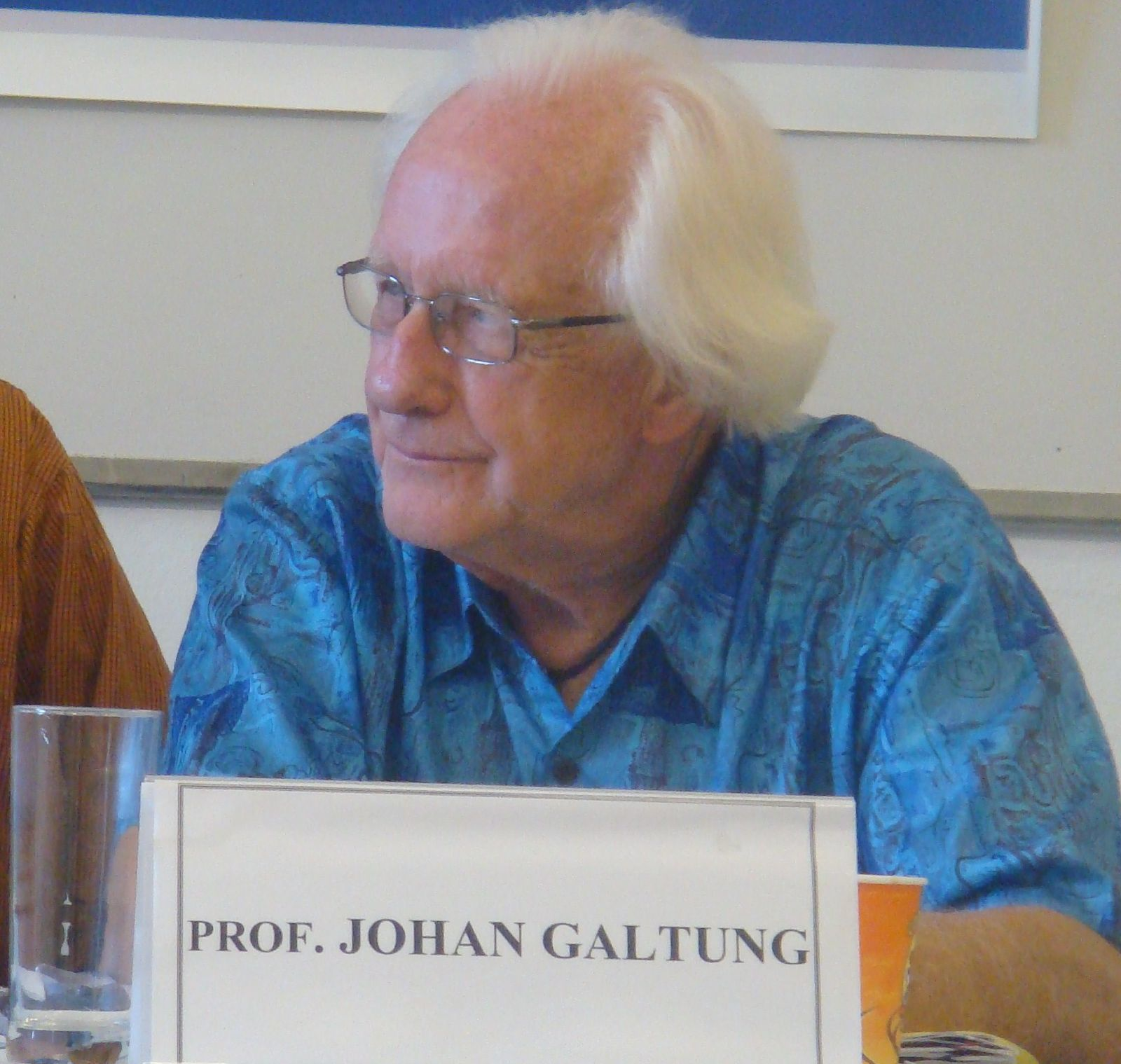
Johan Galtung, principal founder of peace and conflict studies, held the world's first chair in that discipline 1969–1977

- Dag Album
- Vilhelm Aubert
- Margunn Bjørnholt
- Grete Brochmann
- Nils Christie
- Ingrid Eide
- Fredrik Engelstad
- Ivar Frønes
- Johan Galtung, founder of peace and conflict studies, held the world's first chair in that discipline at the University of Oslo 1969–1977
- Erik Grønseth
- Gudmund Hernes
- Sverre Holm
- Geir Høgsnes
- Ragnvald Kalleberg
- Suzanne Stiver Lie
- Ulla-Britt Lilleaas
- Sverre Lysgaard
- Arne Mastekaasa
- Thomas Mathiesen
- Willy Pedersen
- Natalie Rogoff Ramsøy
- Sigurd Skirbekk
- Dag Østerberg

=== Social anthropology ===
- Fredrik Barth
- Unni Wikan

=== Theology ===
- Dag Thorkildsen

=== Palaeontology ===
- Jørn Hurum, Professor at the Natural History Museum, known for his work on the Darwinius fossil

=== Geology ===
- Adolf Hoel, one of the leading Arctic researchers in the first half of the 20th century; founder of the Norwegian Polar Institute; credited for Norway obtaining the sovereignty over Svalbard and Queen Maud Land; served as Rector of the university; namesake of the mineral hoelite and the Hoel Mountains

=== Linguistics ===
- Didrik Arup Seip, Professor of North Germanic languages; served as Rector of the university
- Finn Thiesen
- Finn-Erik Vinje

== Notable alumni ==
=== Heads of government ===
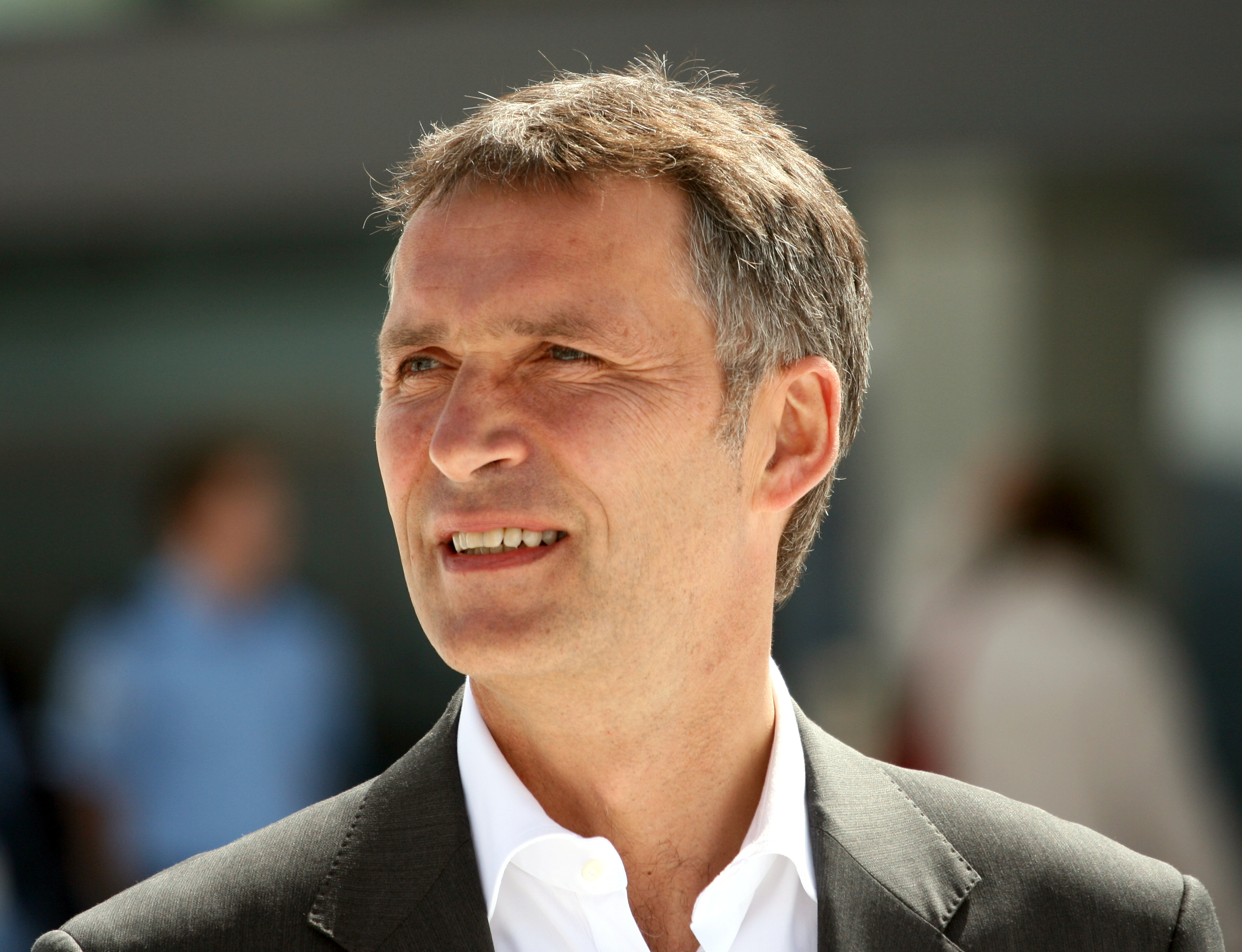
Jens Stoltenberg, the former Prime Minister of Norway and secretary general of NATO, graduated as an economist at the University of Oslo in 1987.

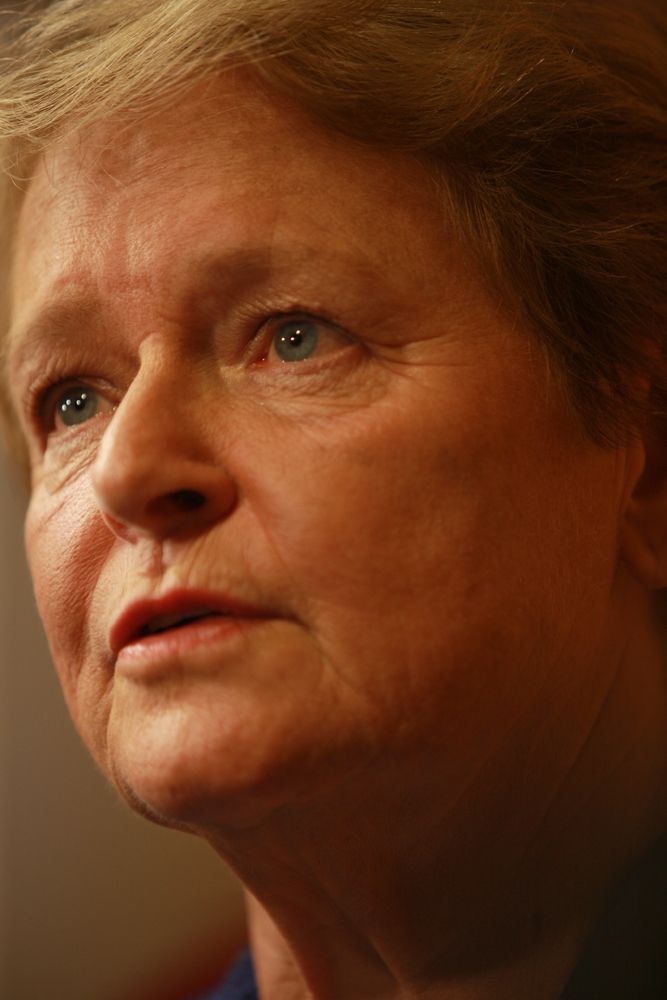
Gro Harlem Brundtland, former Prime Minister of Norway and Director General of the World Health Organization, graduated as a physician at the University of Oslo in 1963.

- Otto Albert Blehr, Prime Minister of Norway (cand. jur.)
- Gro Harlem Brundtland, Prime Minister of Norway (cand. med.)
- Ingolf Elster Christensen, Chairman of the Administrative Council (cand. jur.)
- Francis Hagerup, Prime Minister of Norway (cand. jur. and dr. juris.); Professor of Law at the University of Oslo
- Otto B. Halvorsen, Prime Minister of Norway (cand. jur.)
- Thorbjørn Jagland, Prime Minister of Norway (exam. oecon.)
- Gunnar Knudsen, Prime Minister of Norway (cand. philos.)
- Wollert Konow (SB), Prime Minister of Norway (law student, but did not graduate)
- John Lyng, Prime Minister of Norway (cand. jur.)
- Johan Ludwig Mowinckel, Prime Minister of Norway (cand. philos.)
- Christian August Selmer, Prime Minister of Norway (cand. jur.)
- Christian Schweigaard, Prime Minister of Norway (cand. jur.)
- Emil Stang, Prime Minister of Norway (cand. jur.)
- Frederik Stang, Prime Minister of Norway (cand. jur.)
- Johannes Steen, Prime Minister of Norway (cand. philol.)
- Jens Stoltenberg, Prime Minister of Norway (cand. oecon.)
- Johan Sverdrup, Prime Minister of Norway (cand. jur.)
- Jan P. Syse, Prime Minister of Norway (cand. jur.)
- Kåre Willoch, Prime Minister of Norway (cand. oecon.)

=== Government and politics ===
- Farida Ahmadi, Afghan author, speaker and women's rights activist
- Steinar Andresen, political scientist and Research Professor at the Fridtjof Nansen Institute
- Petrit Selimi, Deputy Minister of Foreign Affairs of Kosovo
- Naomi Waqo, Kenyan MP

=== Arts and media ===
- Harald Eia, comedian (cand.polit. in sociology)
- Imam Meskini, actress

=== Business and finance ===
- Håkon Wium Lie, developed Cascading Style Sheets and was Chief Technology Officer of Opera Software
- Erling Maartmann-Moe, venture capitalist and computer scientist
- Jon Stephenson von Tetzchner, CEO of Vivaldi Technologies

=== Lawyers and judges ===
- Paal Berg, Chief Justice of the Supreme Court of Norway; also Minister of Justice and the Police
- Sverre Grette, Chief Justice of the Supreme Court of Norway
- Morten Diderik Emil Lambrechts, Chief Justice of the Supreme Court of Norway
- Einar Løchen, Chief Justice of the Supreme Court of Norway; also Minister of Justice and the Police
- Peder Carl Lasson, Chief Justice of the Supreme Court of Norway; also Minister of Justice and the Police
- Hans Gerhard Colbjørnsen Meldahl, Chief Justice of the Supreme Court of Norway; also Minister of Justice and the Police
- Rolv Ryssdal, Chief Justice of the Supreme Court of Norway
- Erling Sandene, Chief Justice of the Supreme Court of Norway
- Herman Scheel, Chief Justice of the Supreme Court of Norway; also Minister of Justice and the Police
- Tore Schei, Chief Justice of the Supreme Court of Norway
- Carsten Smith, Chief Justice of the Supreme Court of Norway
- Emil Stang (born 1882), Chief Justice of the Supreme Court of Norway
- Karenus Kristofer Thinn, Chief Justice of the Supreme Court of Norway
- Iver Steen Thomle, Chief Justice of the Supreme Court of Norway; also Minister of Justice and the Police
- Terje Wold, Chief Justice of the Supreme Court of Norway; also Minister of Justice and the Police

=== Science ===
- Dagmar Karin Sørbøe (born 1945), physiotherapist and women's rights activist
