= Department of Sociology and Human Geography, University of Oslo =

Department of Sociology and Human Geography
- Institutt for sosiologi og samfunnsgeografi
- Abbreviation: ISS
- Formation: 7 January 1950; 76 years ago
- Type: Institute
- Location: Oslo
- Parent organization: University of Oslo
- Website: www.sv.uio.no/iss/english/

The Department of Sociology and Human Geography (Norwegian: Institutt for sosiologi og samfunnsgeografi) at the University of Oslo is the oldest and largest research institute and educational institution in sociology in Norway. The department had a central role in the development of sociology as a discipline in Norway in the postwar era, and several of its academics, such as Vilhelm Aubert and Erik Grønseth, have been internationally noted in the history of sociology.

The Department of Sociology was established on 7 January 1950, and was originally part of the Faculty of Humanities. In 1963 it became part of the newly formed Faculty of Social Sciences. In 1996 the Department of Sociology merged with the Department of Human Geography to create the current institute. The institute is based in the building Harriet Holters hus at the Blindern campus of the university.

From its establishment the department was heavily influenced by American sociology, more so than most other European sociology institutes, but over time the American influence has declined somewhat. Major research topics in the early history of the department included social stratification, social change, basic forms of behaviour, communication research, industrial psychology, and the psychology of law.

== Notable academics ==
- Dag Album
- Vilhelm Aubert
- Margunn Bjørnholt
- Grete Brochmann
- Ingrid Eide
- Fredrik Engelstad
- Ivar Frønes
- Erik Grønseth
- Gudmund Hernes
- Sverre Holm
- Geir Høgsnes
- Ragnvald Kalleberg
- Ulla-Britt Lilleaas
- Sverre Lysgaard
- Arne Mastekaasa
- Willy Pedersen
- Natalie Rogoff Ramsøy
- Sigurd Skirbekk
- Dag Østerberg
