= Geir Høgsnes =

Norwegian sociologist

- Born: 2 December 1950; Snåsa Municipality, Norway
- Died: 3 June 2009 (aged 58); Oslo, Norway
- Cause of death: Poisoning
- Education: University of Oslo
- Scientific career
- Fields: sociology (labor market, wages)
- Workplaces: Norwegian Institute for Social Research; Norwegian University of Science and Technology; University of Oslo

Geir Lennart Høgsnes (2 December 1950 – 3 June 2009) was a Norwegian sociologist. He did research on labor and wages, and spent the better part of his academic career at the Norwegian Institute for Social Research and the University of Oslo. He worked as a professor until his murder in 2009.

== Academic career ==
He hailed from Snåsa Municipality. He obtained the mag.art. degree (PhD equivalent) in sociology at the University of Oslo in 1981, and took the dr.polit. degree in 1994. He was a researcher at the Norwegian Institute for Social Research from 1981 to 1998, was an associate professor at Norwegian University of Science and Technology from 1996 to 1998 and the University of Oslo from 1999 to 2000. In 2000 he became a professor at the University of Oslo. He headed the Department of Sociology and Human Geography from 2002 to 2007.

He was the editor of the journal Tidsskrift for samfunnsforskning from 1999 to 2005.

He has been interviewed about the disparity between men's and women's earnings and on strike actions by Norwegian workers. He has also done research on the role of women, elderly workers and immigrants in Norway's labor market.

Selected bibliography

- Krone for krone. Lønnsforhandlinger og -fordelinger, 1999
- "Decentralized Wage Bargaining - A Threat to Incomes Policy Goals or an Instrument of Flexibility?", with Frode Longva. In Henry Milner and Eskil Wadensjö (eds.), Gösta Rehn, the Swedish Model and Labour Market Policies, 2001
- "Arbeidsliv, lønn og forhandlinger", with Arvid Fennefoss. In Ivar Frønes & Lise Kjølsrød (eds.), Det norske samfunn, 2003

== Death ==
On 3 June 2009, Høgsnes and his Chinese wife of three months were found dead in their Uranienborg apartment. A police investigation established that she had poisoned them both in a murder–suicide.
