= Carl Hjortsjö =

Swedish dentist

- Born: 1971 (age 54–55)
- Occupation: Dentist

Carl Hjortsjö (born 22 October 1971) is a Swedish dentist. He became Head of Institute of Clinical Dentistry, Faculty of Dentistry, at University of Oslo in 2021.

== Doctorate ==
He received his doctorate in 2010 at the University of Oslo, Norway. His thesis title was "Studies on the effect of hydrofluoric acid in prevention of early dental erosion".

== Research ==
His research interests are in the field of oral prosthetics, bite function, bite physiology, treatment of patients with temporomandibular dysfunction (TMD) and dental erosion.

== Dental practice ==
He received his dental surgeon diploma from the University of Gothenburg, Sweden in 1995. In the same year Hjortsjö was given the dental surgeon authorization in Sweden. In 1996, he received authorization as dental surgeon in Norway. He completed a specialist training in prosthetic dentistry at the University of Oslo in 2004. He was authorized as specialist prosthetic dentist in 2007.

In 1996, Hjortsjö worked as a dental surgeon at the Oslo public dental health service (Oslo offentlige tannhelsetjeneste), and as a dentist at the Clark House Dental Surgeries in Plymouth, England between 1996 and 1999. From 1999 to 2005, he was a dental surgeon at the Colosseumklinikken, Department Asker. Between 2002 and 2005, he served as a dentist instructor at the Institute of Clinical Dentistry, University of Oslo. He was also a dental surgeon specialist in prosthetic dentistry at the Oslo Klinikken, Oslo Galleri from 2004 for two years. Since 2005, Hjortsjö has been a dental surgeon specialist in prosthetic dentistry at Tannlege Sydow og Mo, in Drammen.

== Academia ==
In 2005, he became a lecturer in the Department of Prosthetics and Oral Function at Faculty of Dentistry, University of Oslo and worked there until 2006. Currently, he is an external lecture in several Institutions. He is responsible for teaching bite physiology at the University of Oslo, bite splint treatment on temporomandibular dysfunction courses for manual therapists and chiropractors, and he has contributed to the Norwegian Directorate of Health's guideline on temporomandibular dysfunction in 2016.

From 2017 to 2020, Hjortsjö was Head of Section in the Department of Prosthetics and Oral Function at Faculty of Dentistry, University of Oslo. In two of these years, 2019 to 2020, he was also the Deputy Head of Department at Institute of Clinical Dentistry, at the University of Oslo.

== Organisational affiliations and recognition ==
He was Board member of the Norwegian Society of Prosthetic Dentistry (NFOP) between 2007 and 2016. Hjortsjö has previously been member of the Oslo Dental Association's professional committee from 2014 to 2015. He received Den norske tannlegeforening (NTF) Prize for dental education and research in 2014.
