= Tiril Willumsen =

Norwegian academic

- Born: 1957 (age 68–69)

Tiril Willumsen (born 28 November 1957) is the Dean at the Faculty of Dentistry, University of Oslo, Norway, since 1 January 2021. She became a professor at the Institute of Clinical Dentistry, at the Faculty in 2012.

In 1981, she completed her graduate training at the University of Oslo, Norway. Willumsen defended her PhD thesis entitled "Treatment of dental phobia: short-time and long-time effects of nitrous oxide sedation, cognitive therapy and applied relaxation, monograph" at the University of Oslo, in 1999.

She worked as a university research fellow at Faculty of Dentistry, at the University of Oslo between 1995 and 1999. Willumsen was a postdoctoral research fellow at the University of Oslo, Faculty of Dentistry from 1999 to 2003. She was appointed Associate Professor and Head of Gerodontology at the University of Oslo, in the Department of Cariology and Gerodontology for the period of 2003 and 2011.

During her specific career, Willumsen has been a professor in behavioural sciences from 2012, and head of Department of Pediatric Dentistry and Behavioral Sciences, at the University of Oslo from 2018 to 2020.

Her particular research interests include behavioral sciences, dental anxiety with special focus upon victims of sexual abuse, domestic violence and torture, psychologically traumatised patients in the dental clinic, and gerodontology. She has a special interest in trauma-sensitive communication in the dental practice, and educating future dental personnel on the importance of these issues.

She was the project manager of the 'Four Good Habits' course at the University of Oslo. The videos have been prepared for the course, at the Faculty of Dentistry for use as part of the dental and dental-hygienist student's curriculum as well as postgraduate education.

Willumsen was awarded the Akademikerprisen by the Federation of Norwegian Professional Associations in 2014.

== Books ==
- Willumsen, Wenaasen, Fereirra, Armingohar, J. Nursing and oral health. Guide to good oral care in patients with functional impairment. Gyldendal 2008, ISBN 978-92-05-37995-4.
- Willumsen, Myran, Lein (ed) Odontological psychology, Gyldendal 2018, ISBN 978-82-05-51079-1.
