= Suzanne Stiver Lie =

Norwegian sociologist

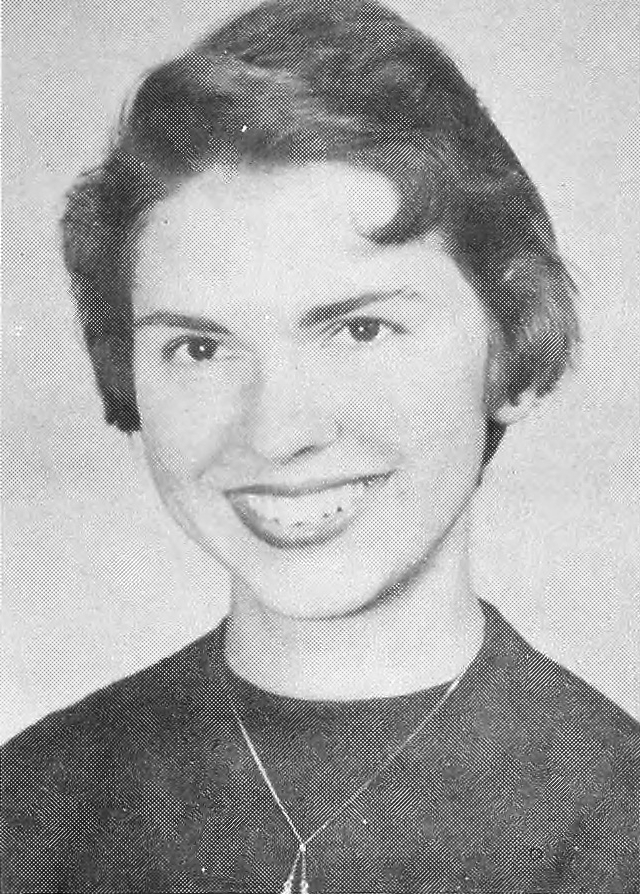
- Stiver in 1956
- Born: Suzanne Stiver; 26 April 1934; Fort Wayne, Allen County, Indiana
- Died: 28 September 2018 (aged 84); Oslo, Norway
- Occupation: Academic
- Years active: 1975-2001
- Known for: founding women's studies programs

Suzanne Stiver Lie (26 April 1934 – 28 September 2018) was an American-born Norwegian women's rights activist and professor who worked to develop Women's Studies programs in Norway, Lithuania and Estonia. Her major research emphasis was on inequality in higher education and on migrant women.

== Early life and education ==
Suzanne Stiver was born on 26 April 1934 in Fort Wayne, Allen County, Indiana to Dorothy Irene (née McCurdy) and Edward Raymond Stiver, a pharmacist. She graduated from South Side High School in 1952 and went on to graduate in 1956 from Wittenberg College in Springfield, Ohio. After her graduation, Stiver spent a year in Berlin teaching English and other subjects in a program sponsored by the Lutheran World Federation. She married Kai Olaf Lie on 22 December 1957 in Allen County. Kai had been an exchange student during Stiver's time at Wittenberg and he would go on to become an ambassador of Norway, causing them to relocate as his work required. The couple moved to Washington, D.C., where Lie worked as a graduate assistant in the sociology department at American University. There she completed her master's degree in 1967, and a PhD in sociology in 1973 with dissertations evaluating education in Norway.

== Career ==
During the studies for her PhD, Lie was employed at the Norwegian Institute for Social Research in Oslo and then was employed at the Agricultural College of Norway in Ås until 1975. She was hired to lecture at the Social Pedagogical Study Alternative unit of the University of Oslo and remained until 1977, when she accepted a two-year research position at Diakonhjemmet University College, evaluating social work practices. When she completed the project, Lie was hired as an assistant professor in the Institute for Educational Research at the University of Oslo. Lie believed work in women's studies was regarded by the institute as of little relevance. Finding little support within Norway, she worked with international researchers in the field to enable her to publish. Her area of study concerned migrating women and women in education. In 1983, she, Berit Ås, and Maj Birgit Rørslett, were commissioned to create an experimental project and establish Norway's first Women's University. In 1989, Lie was appointed to head the Women's Studies Program at the University of Oslo and in 1991 became the vice director of equal opportunities at the university in 1991. She earned an appointment as a full professor in 1993.

In 1992, the Women's Studies Centre of Vilnius University was founded by the Lithuanian Association of University Women. The center invited academics from Scandinavia and the United States to assist in the creation of the curricula. Lie and Ås represented the University of Oslo. Others involved included Inger Lövkrona of Lund University, Isabel Marcus from the University at Buffalo, Aili Nenola of the University of Helsinki, Bruce Nordstrom-Loeb from the University of Minnesota, Elżbieta Pakszys of Adam Mickiewicz University, and Hildur Ve from the University of Bergen. Between 1995 and 2000, Lie obtained permission from the University of Oslo to work in Tallinn, Estonia, while her husband was posted there. In 1997, she and Eda Sepp co-founded an NGO, Eesti Naisuurimus—ja Teabekeskus (ENUT, Estonian Women's Studies and Research Center) with the help of the educational sciences department of Tallinn Pedagogical University and Tartu University. Lie became the academic director of the center, which operated financially and institutionally separately from the universities. In her role as director, she trained the staff and negotiated for funds to support furnishing and equipping the center from the Nordic Council of Ministers.

== Research ==
In her research on immigrant women, in such works as Mellom to kulturer kvinnelige innvandrere i Norge (Between Two Cultures: Female Immigrants in Norway), Lie ignored the stereotypical view of migrants as economically poor women from the Global South and evaluated a broad spectrum of migrating women including those who migrated for economic reasons, refugees, and foreign spouses. She argued that migrant women were not appendages of husbands and questioned immigration policies that treated women as dependent upon a male breadwinner and failed to recognize that their family units might not comply with social norms. Lie also pointed out that migrant women often had difficulty having their educational achievements recognized in their new country and contributed a separate article on Yugoslavian migrants to the anthology.

Studies carried out by Lie and Rørslett which began in 1984, noted that academia was particularly difficult as a field for women because unlike women in vocational or artistic fields, gaps in employment impacted their seniority and networking ability. The anthology, Storming the Tower: Women in the Academic World evaluated the barriers to women's achievements in academia, weighing the differences that characteristics like class, ethnicity, and sexual orientation played as well. The book evaluated the production of women academics and found no differences to their male counterparts in the Netherlands, Norway and the United States, despite discriminatory hiring practices, which often assigned women to temporary or part-time positions or fields like the humanities. Evaluating whether production was hampered for married women, the authors found that in the United States, married women published more often than single women. Their findings also concluded that women who had greater access to networking opportunities were likely to be more productive. The work noted the inability of women of color and lesbians to access the same networks often placed them at a disadvantage in academia. The final chapter dealt with mechanisms that women could access, such as the legal system, media, and university policy boards to counterbalance the problems encountered in trying to gain equal treatment, as well as alternatives, such as creating separate women's study centers. At the time, research on women in academia was "rudamentary", as noted by Swedish sociologist Boel Berner and the book addressed issues and solutions but was limited in presenting a global picture and in evaluating why the university setting was singled out for study.

In 1994, Lie, Lynda Malik, and Duncan Harris compiled an analysis of higher education across seventeen countries throughout the world, though it did not include Latin America or the Caribbean. Their findings indicated that there was little equality in higher education, though there is not a single cause. According to the research gender inequality stems from various factors including cultural norms, social class, location (urban versus rural) and political systems. For example, despite East/West cultural divides and different political systems, women in Germany were confined to gender specific employment, which was characterized by low pay and little authority. Within academia, though policy often calls for legal equality and scholarship to maximize expertise, power positions are often entrenched with few women rising to the position of full professor. The following year Lie and Rørslett published their findings, Alma maters døtre: et århundre med kvinner i akademisk utdanning (Alma Mater's Daughters: A Century of Women in Academic Education) from their decade of research on women in academia.

In the anthology Carrying Linda's Stones Lie and the other editors studied the impact of the Soviet period upon Estonian women. It was the first English-language book to collect the histories of those who were forcibly deported or who chose to live in exile. It examined dislocations from a feminist perspective evaluating how socio-political forces impacted women and specifically analyzed how the pseudo-equality of the Soviet period and then the independence of Estonia, pushed women's issues to the background in the quest for national identity.

== Death and legacy ==
Lie died on 28 September 2018 in Oslo. Lie's studies on women's education and her assistance in founding women's studies programs in Scandinavia and Eastern Europe were significant in developing broader understanding of the meaning of equality and democracy.

== Selected works ==
- Lie, Suzanne (1967). An Analysis of Norwegian Educational Attainment According to Place of Residence and Sex, 1950 (master's). Washington, D.C.: American University. OCLC 57408297.
- Lie, Suzanne (1973). The Norwegian Comprehensive School Reform: Strategies for Implementing and Complying with Regulated Social Change — A Diffusion Study (PhD). Washington, D.C.: American University. OCLC 52965299.
- Lie, Suzanne Stiver (1980). "Kvinnorna inom vetenskapen: forskare och forskningsobjekt" [Women in Science: Researchers and Research Objects]. Kvinnovetenskaplig Tidskrift (in Swedish). 1 (2). Lund, Sweden: Lund Kvinnovetenskaplig tidskrift: 31–42. ISSN 0348-8365. OCLC 936807683.
- Lie, Suzanne Stiver (1983). Immigrant Women in Norway: Immigrant Women and Their Work; A Study of British, Yugoslavian, and Chilean Immigrant Women. Hong Kong: Asian Research Service. ISBN 978-962-234-010-7.
- Lie, Suzanne Stiver, ed. (1986). Mellom to kulturer: kvinnelige innvandrere i Norge [Between Two Cultures: Female Immigrants in Norway] (in Norwegian). Oslo: Universitesforlaget. ISBN 978-82-00-07458-8.
- Lie, Suzanne Stiver; O'Leary, Virginia E., eds. (1990). Storming the Tower: Women in the Academic World. London: Kogan Page. ISBN 978-1-85091-872-1.
- Lie, Suzanne Stiver; Malik, Lynda; Harris, N. D. C. (1994). World Yearbook of Education, 1994: The Gender Gap in Higher Education. London: Kogan Page. ISBN 978-0-7494-1079-7.
- Lie, Suzanne Stiver; Rørslett, Maj Birgit (1995). Alma maters døtre: et århundre med kvinner i akademisk utdanning [Alma Mater's Daughters: A Century of Women in Academic Education] (in Norwegian). Oslo: Pax Forlag. ISBN 978-82-530-1730-3.
- Lie, Suzanne Stiver; Malik, Lynda; Jõe-Cannon, Ilvi; Hinrikus, Rutt; Wos, Aldona, eds. (2006). Carrying Linda's Stones: An Anthology of Estonian Women's Life Stories. Tallinn, Estonia: Tallinn University Press. ISBN 978-9985-58-667-9.
