= Erik Rinde =

Norwegian social scientist (1919–1994)

Erik Rinde (17 March 1919 – 28 May 1994) was a Norwegian jurist who became a pioneer of social sciences in Norway.

The social sciences witnessed an impetus worldwide after the end of World War II, but were little developed in Norway. From 1946 a group of researchers led by philosopher Arne Næss sought to improve this field of research. Rinde had graduated as a jurist from the University of Oslo in 1943, but had also studied sociology at the London School of Economics. He joined the group of Arne Næss, although he had a more administrative role. A son of businessman Sigurd Rinde, Erik Rinde had several contacts that proved valuable, securing the financing of early projects. In 1950, Rinde and Næss founded the Institute for Social Research. Other people involved were Vilhelm Aubert and Stein Rokkan. Rinde served as both managing director and chair for many years. He left the chair in the early 1970s, but returned in 1988 following the death of Vilhelm Aubert. He was also instrumental in the foundation of the Peace Research Institute Oslo (PRIO).

Rinde was decorated with the Royal Norwegian Order of St. Olav, and received an honorary degree at the University of Oslo.
