= Aili Nenola =

Finnish cultural studies scholar

- Born: Aili Annikki Nenola; October 27, 1942 (age 84); Haukipudas, Finland
- Other name: Nenola-Kallio (1966–1988)
- Education: University of Turku
- Spouse: Jussi Kallio (m. 1966; div. 1988)
- Children: 2
- Scientific career
- Fields: Folklore; women's studies; religious studies
- Thesis: Studies in Ingrian Laments (1983)
- Doctoral advisor: Lauri Honko

Aili Annikki Nenola (in 1966–1988 Nenola-Kallio; born 27 October 1942) is professor emerita of the University of Helsinki. Her research specialty was folklore and she pioneered multidisciplinary and critical women's studies in Finland, designing the curricula and introducing courses at the University of Tartu. She later assisted in establishing the national curricula for women's studies, became director of the graduate program in women's studies at the Kristiina Institute, and secured accreditation of the field as a degree major. Nenola was also a participant in creating the curriculum of the Women's Studies Centre of Vilnius, Lithuania. From 1995 to 2006 she taught women's studies at the University of Helsinki and simultaneously served as the Dean of the Faculty of Humanities between 2004 and 2006. In 1999, Nenola was honored as a Knight, first class, of the Order of the White Rose of Finland and was elected to the Finnish Academy of Science and Letters in 2002.

== Early life and education ==
Aili Annikki Nenola was born on 27 October 1942 in Haukipudas, Finland. She began her studies in 1962, initially with the Finnish language and comparative literature at University of Turku. She changed her major to philosophy, earning a bachelor's degree in 1971. Between 1970 and 1975, she served as a research assistant at Turku to Lauri Honko and earned her Licentiate in 1975. During her graduate studies, she worked as an assistant in the Religious Studies Department from 1975 to 1982. She completed her PhD in religion at Turku University in 1983 with a dissertation, Studies in Ingrian Laments which examined the traditional grieving and mourning rituals of Ingrian women. The topic influenced her to pursue a career based upon examining the cultural and social roles of women.

== Career ==
Nenola began her career as a senior lecturer of Folklore and Religious Studies at the University of Turku in 1982. Simultaneously she served docent for the Folklore studies at the University of Oulu from 1984. In the 1980s, academics from various schools developed an introductory course in women's studies, holding lectures presenting various disciplines. The events rotated between locations, and Nenola participated in the events. In 1986, a national convention of academics interested in developing a women's studies degree program was held in Kajaani to establish requirements for the degree. The first degree program was offered in 1987 in Helsinki and the following year, Nenola designed the curriculum and introduced the women's studies program in Turku. It was an unofficial area of study within the Department of Folklore and Religious Studies. Between 1990 and 1992, she directed the National Women's Studies Steering Committee for the Academy of Finland. Her duties included visiting all the universities in the country which offered courses in women's studies and recommending networking opportunities and standardization of criteria. As a result of their work, in 1991, the Kristiina Institute of Women's Research Studies was founded at the University of Helsinki to offer graduate courses in gender studies.

In 1992, Nenola returned as a senior lecturer to the University of Turku. That year, the Women's Studies Centre of Vilnius University was founded by the Lithuanian Association of University Women. The center invited academics from Scandinavia and the United States to assist in the creation of the curricula. Nenola was invited to participate from the University of Helsinki. Others involved included Berit Ås and Suzanne Lie from the University of Oslo, Inger Lövkrona representing Lund University, Isabel Marcus of the University at Buffalo, Bruce Nordstrom-Loeb from the University of Minnesota, Elżbieta Pakszys of Adam Mickiewicz University, and Hildur Ve from the University of Bergen. Nenola was hired in 1995 as a professor at the University of Helsinki and the director of the Kristiina Institute. In 1999, she was honored as a Knight, first class, of the Order of the White Rose of Finland and in 2002, she was elected to membership in the Finnish Academy of Science and Letters. In 2003, after years of lobbying by Nenola, the women's studies program at the University of Helsinki was given full accreditation as a degree major. Though she had pressed for the program to gain autonomy, she also wanted it to be integrated within other majors, but that was not realized during her tenure. In 2004, Nenola moved into administration, serving as the first woman to be Dean of the Faculty of Arts at Helsinki University until 2006. She was awarded the Maikki Friberg Equality Award in 2006 and retired in 2007.

== Research ==
Nenola examined gender systems in Finland as they were represented in both contemporary society and traditional Finnish-Karelians cultures through her exploration of folklore. She analyzed kinship networks and marriage customs as depicted in literature, noting that traditionally men held power and authority. Portrayals of women, even if they were the protagonist, were characterized as submissive. She found that it was typical for female characters to be morally culpable for the actions of their male counterparts. Her main work from the 1970s when she assisted Honko was on translations of the Ingrian Laments. It took 20 years to bring her thesis to final publication. She collected between 600 and 700 texts, mostly of wedding laments and provided both the original texts and translations into English. Nenola examined the tradition of mourning texts as they appeared in the Ingrian region across both Finland and Russia. Rather than analyzing the socio-political battleground of the region, as was typical of other studies of the Ingrian culture, she looked at the distinct tradition of women's poetry. Employing an interdisciplinary method including anthropology, social psychology, sociology, and theology, her work sought to determine how lamentations were used in society and the meaning behind the tradition. Her approach, using techniques from women's studies were influential, and could be seen in other analysis of the genre, such as a study, Kahden maailman välillä (Between Two Worlds) by Laura Jetsu.

== Personal life ==
Between 1966–1988 Aili Nenola was married to Jussi Kallio, and they had two children. Their daughter Helena Kallio is an actor and writer.

== Selected works ==
- Nenola, Aili (1981). "Inkeriläiset itkuhäät [Ingrian Laments Wedding]". In Sarmela, Matti (ed.). Pohjolan häät [Nordic Wedding]. Tietolipas (in Finnish). Vol. 85. Helsinki: Suomalaisen kirjallisuuden seura. ISBN 978-951-717-235-6.
- Nenola, Aili (1983). Studies in Ingrian Laments (PhD). FF communications. Vol. 234. Helsinki: Finnish Academy of Science and Letters. ISBN 978-951-41-0451-0.
- Nenola, Aili (1986). Miessydäminen nainen: naisnäkökulmia kulttuuriin [Male-hearted Woman: Female Perspectives on Culture]. Tietolipas (in Finnish). Vol. 102. Helsinki: Suomalaisen Kirjallisuuden Seura. ISBN 978-951-717-432-9.
- Nenola, Aili (1994). "Folkloristiikka ja sukupuolitettu maailma [Folklore and the Gendered World]". In Kupiainen, Jari; Sevänen, Erkki (eds.). Kulttuurintutkimus: johdanto [Cultural Research: Introduction]. Tietolipas (in Finnish). Vol. 130. Helsinki: Suomalaisen Kirjallisuuden Seura. ISBN 978-951-717-793-1.
- Apo, Satu; Nenola, Aili; Laura, Stark-Arola, eds. (1998). Gender and Folklore: Perspectives on Finnish and Karelian Culture. Studia Fennica Folkloristica. Vol. 4. Helsinki: Finnish Literature Society. ISBN 978-951-717-836-5.
- Nenola, Aili (2002). Inkerin itkuvirret [Ingrian Laments] (in Finnish). Helsinki: Suomalaisen Kirjallisuuden Seura. ISBN 978-951-746-058-3.
