= Obiora =

- Gender: Male
- Language: Igbo

Origin
- Origin: Nigeria
- Meaning: Heart of the people
- Region of origin: Southeast Nigeria

Other names
- Short form: Obi

Obiora // is a given name and a surname of Igbo origin in Nigeria. The name means "heart of the people".

== Notable people with the given name include ==
- Obiora Chinedu Okafor, Canadian lawyer
- Obiora Odita (born 1983), Nigerian footballer
- Obiora Udechukwu (born 1946), Nigerian painter and poet

== Notable people with the surname include ==
- Anoure Obiora (born 1986), Nigerian footballer
- Arinze Obiora (born 1985), Nigerian high jumper
- Michael Obiora (born 1986), British actor and writer
- Nwankwo Obiora (born 1991), Nigerian footballer
