= Dag Album =

Norwegian sociologist (born 1948)

Dag Gunnar Album (born 1948) is a Norwegian sociologist.

He graduated from the University of Oslo with a cand.sociol. degree in 1972, and took the dr.philos. degree in 1996. He then worked as a research assistant at the University of Tromsø and as a researcher at Statistics Norway. He then returned to the University of Oslo in 1997 to become professor.

Album was a member of the board of the Norwegian Institute for Social Research from 2005 to 2008, and was re-elected for the term 2009 to 2012.

== Selected bibliography ==
- Nære fremmede, 1996.
