= Mikael Males =

Swedish professor of medieval studies

Mikael Meuller Males (born 2 March 1977) is a Swedish professor of Medieval Studies at Oslo University. He has written extensively about Old Norse philology, especially the problems of dating Old Norse poetry.

== Books ==
- Males, Mikael Meuller (2024). Den äldsta fornnordiska litteraturen. Nya vetenskapliga rön. Dialogos Förlag. ISBN 9789175044347.
- Kjesrud, Karoline & Males, Mikael (2020). Faith & Knowledge in Late Medieval & Early Modern Scandinavia. Brepols. ISBN 9782503579009.
- Males, Mikael (2020). The Poetic Genesis of Old Icelandic Literature. Walter de Gruyter (De Gruyter). ISBN 9783110641837.
- Males, Mikael (2019). Etymology and Wordplay in Medieval Literature. Brepols. ISBN 9782503575759.
- Males, Mikael (2017). Snorre och sagorna. De isländska källorna till vår äldre kulturhistoria. Dialogos Förlag. ISBN 9789175043258.
