= Olav Torgersen =

Norwegian pathologist

Olav Torgersen (25 September 1907 – 1978) was a Norwegian pathologist.

He was born in Kristiansand as a son of wholesaler Carl Torgersen (1871–1950) and Kristine Torgersen (1874–1910). He finished his secondary education in 1926 and graduated from the Royal Frederick University with the cand.med. degree in 1934. In 1939 he married colonel's daughter Ada Jørgensen (1913–1967).

He substituted for the district physician in Finnmark from 1934 to 1935, before working at the Norwegian Radium Hospital from 1936 and the Institute of Forensic Medicine, Oslo from 1938. In 1940 he took his dr.med. degree with the thesis Om binyrenes variable struktur og deres motstandsevne mot røntgenbestråling, about x-rays to the adrenal glands.

He was hired at Rikshospitalet in 1940, and served at the university as a prosector from 1943. In 1948 he was promoted to professor. His special field was pathological anatomy. He edited the journal Acta Pathologica et Microbiologica Scandinavica, and was a fellow of the International Academy of Pathology and the WHO Expert Advisory Panel on Chronic Degenerative Diseases. From 1966 to 1972 he was the deputy chairman of Landsforeningen mot kreft, which since a 1998 merger is known as the Norwegian Cancer Society. He was instrumental in the 1973 establishment of the Janus Serum Bank, a collaborative cancer biobank.

He resided in Bærum. He died in 1978.
