= Ingrid Eide =

Norwegian politician

Ingrid Eide (born 12 July 1933 in Oslo) is a Norwegian sociologist, United Nations official and politician for Norway's Labour Party.

== Political career ==
From 1973 to 1976, during the second Bratteli cabinet, Eide was appointed State Secretary in the Ministry of Church Affairs and Education. She served as a deputy representative to the Norwegian Parliament from Sør-Trøndelag during the terms 1977–1981 and 1981–1985. From 1979 to 1981 she met as a regular representative, replacing Knut Frydenlund, who was appointed to the first Brundtland cabinet.

== Professional career ==
Outside politics she was a sociologist, having graduated with a master's degree from the University of Oslo in 1960. Her final paper was Noen skolesosiologiske problemer: en organisasjonsanalyse av en folkeskole i Oslo i 1959, an organizational study of a primary school. From 1957 to 1960 she studied at the Columbia University, working as a research assistant at the Bureau of Applied Social Research there. In 1959 she became a research assistant at the Norwegian Institute for Social Research, and was transferred to the International Peace Research Institute, Oslo upon its establishment in 1966. She was a research assistant at the University of Oslo in 1961 and a research fellow at NAVF from 1964 to 1967. From 1968 to 1973 and 1982 to 1987 she was an associate professor in sociology at the University of Oslo.

From 1987 to 1989 she headed the Department for Women and Development at the United Nations Development Programme. She was a member of the board of INSTRAW from 1985 to 1987 and of UNRISD from 1989 to 1993, and a member of the UNESCO Executive Council from 1989 to 1993, the Scientific and Technical Advisory Committee of the Tropical Disease Research Programme from 1994 to 2000 and the UNESCO Culture and Development Steering Committee from 1997.

Returning to Norway, she worked as a counsellor for the Ministry of Culture from 1989 to 1993 and for the international department at the University of Oslo from 1994 to 1998. From 2000 to 2002 she was a member of the board for Oslo University College. In 2003 she was elected chair of Nei til Atomvåpen, an interest organization opposed to nuclear arms.
