= Odd Are Berkaak =

Norwegian anthropologist

Odd Are Berkaak (born 3 June 1950) is a Norwegian social anthropologist.

He graduated as mag.art. (PhD equivalent) from the University of Oslo in 1980. He then worked briefly at the International Peace Research Institute, Oslo, the University of the West Indies and the Telemark University College. He took his dr.philos. degree in 1990, was appointed associate professor at the University of Oslo in 1991 and professor in 1994. He has conducted his field work in Jamaica, Saint Vincent, Zambia and Arizona.
