= Steinar Andresen =

Norwegian political scientist

Steinar Andresen (born February 27, 1951) is a Norwegian political scientist and Research Professor at the Fridtjof Nansen Institute (FNI) in Lysaker, Norway. He holds a Cand. Polit. degree in political science from the University of Oslo, where he served as professor from 2002-2006, and he has been a guest researcher at Princeton University, New Jersey, the Brookings Institution in Washington DC, and the International Institute for Applied Systems Analysis (IIASA) in Austria.

Andresen’s research has particularly focused on the development and design of international regimes and international organizations, not least regarding climate change, environmental issues and resource management. He has contributed extensively to the research field of regime theory, investigating how design and leadership within various international organizations and conventions ultimately have implications for their effectiveness. In recent years, Andresen has also been involved in research on international health cooperation, focusing among other things on global vaccine initiatives such as GAVI and CEPI.

Andresen is member of the editorial board of Climate Law, International Environmental Agreements and Global Environmental Politics.

== Selection of publications ==
- E. Miles, A Underdal, S. Andresen, J. Wettestad, J.B. Skjærseth and E. Carlin, Environmental regime effectiveness, MIT Press, 2002
- S. Andersen and S. Agrawala, Leaders, pushers and laggards in the making of the climate regime, Global Environmental Change, 12 (2002) 41-51.
- S. Andresen, T. Skodvin, A Underdal and J Wettestad, Science and policy in international environmental regimes, Manchester University Press, 2000.
- S. Andresen, E.L. Boasson and G. Hønneland (eds.), International Environmental Agreements, Routledge, 2012
- N. Kanie, S.Andresen and P. Haas (eds), Improving Global Environmental Governance, Routledge, 2014.
- S. Andresen, Guest editor, International Environmental Agreements (INEA), special issue: The Role of the UN in Global Environmental Governance, Springer, Vol.7, No 4, 2007
- K.I. Sandberg, S.Andresen and G.Bjune, A new approach to global health institutions? A case study of new vaccine introduction and the formation of the GAVI Alliance, Social Science and Medicine, 71, 2010, 1349-1356.
- F. Biermann, K. Abbot, S. Andresen et al Navigating the Anthropocene: Improving Earth System Governance, Science, Vol. 335, 2012, 1306-7.
