= Arne Mastekaasa =

Norwegian sociologist

Arne Mastekaasa (born 1955) is a Norwegian sociologist.

He graduated from the University of Oslo with a mag.art. degree (PhD equivalent) in 1981, and took the dr.philos. degree in 1993. For a period he was a researcher at the Institute for Social Research, but he was hired at the University of Oslo in 1990 and is now a professor.

He has been the editor of Acta Sociologica from 1995 to 1997 and since 2010, and Sosiologisk tidsskrift from 2006 to 2009. He has been an editorial board member of Social Indicators Research from 1987 to 2003, Tidsskrift for samfunnsforskning from 1990 to 1993 and Journal of Marriage and Family from 2003 to 2005. He was selected to the European Academy of Sociology in 2009 and the Norwegian Academy of Science and Letters in 2011.
