= Cecilia Bailliet =

Norwegian professor

- Born: 24 April 1969 (age 57); Buenos Aires, Argentina
- Education: George Washington University Law School and the Elliott School of International Affairs and the University of Oslo , Norway
- Occupation: Professor of Law
- Employer: University of Oslo
- Known for: United Nations Independent Expert on human rights and international solidarity
- Predecessor: Obiora Chinedu Okafor

Cecilia M. Bailliet (born 24 April 1969) is a Norwegian/Argentine/US professor of law who became the United Nations Independent Expert on human rights and international solidarity in 2023.

== Life ==
Bailliet was born in 1969 in Buenos Aires. She graduated from George Washington University Law School and the Elliott School of International Affairs, both in the United States, with a joint J.D. and Master's degree in International Affairs.

Bailliet's 2003 doctoral dissertation at the University of Oslo was titled Between Conflict & Consensus: Conciliating Land Disputes in Guatemala. Thereafter she published an article addressing the need for standards for refugees arriving by sea.

In 2006 she called for guidelines for conscientious objectors applying for asylum.

In 2007 Baillet wrote articles on house raids and on women soldiers seeking asylum. In 2012 she addressed due diligence standards in human rights and refugee cases involving women. In 2013 she examined compliance in the Inter-American Court of Human Rights in "Measuring Compliance with the Inter-American Court of Human Rights.

Bailliet is a professor of law at the University of Oslo in Norway where she leads the masters programme in Public International Law. From 2010-2013, Bailliet was Deputy Director of the Institute of Public Law at UiO

In 2015 she published a paper about GQUAL, which is a campaign to highlight the huge gender disparity among appointments to international tribunals and monitoring bodies. The campaign was highlighted by Viviana Krsticevic who noticed this disparity after she was appointed to lead the Center for Justice and International Law as its executive director. In 2015, the European Court of Human Rights had over 90% male judges and over 96% of the judges of the International Court of Justice were male. The International Tribunal for the Law of the Sea's judges were 97.5% male.

Bailliet created the Research Handbook on International Law and Peace in 2020. She created and runs a Masters class titled the International Law of Peace. and she established a series of interviews with international judges on the evolution of international law.

She was Co-Chair of the Latin America Interest Group (2023-2026) of the American Society of International Law.

She has contributed lectures to the UN AudioVisual Library of International Law.

She is on the Advisory Board of the Aarhus School of Business and Social Sciences.

In January 2022 Bailliet became the Chair the Expert Advisory Group set up to support, Obiora Okafor, who was then the UN's Independent Expert on Human Rights and International Solidarity. She created the Research Handbook on International Solidarity which was published in 2024. Bailliet succeeded Obiora Okafor to become the Independent Expert on human rights and international solidarity in October 2023 after she was chosen by the United Nations' Human Rights Council.

In 2025, she gave the UNESCO Mahatma Ghandhi distinguished lecture on peace education.

== Publications include ==
- The Research Handbook on International Solidarity and the Law, 2024
- The Construction of the Customary Law of Peace: Latin America and the Inter-American Court of Human Rights, 2021
- The Research Handbook on International Law and Peace, 2020
- The Legitimacy of International Criminal Tribunals, 2017, co-edited with Nobuo Hayashi.
- Promoting Peace through International Law (co-edited with Kjetil M. Larsen, Oxford 2015)
- Non-State Actors, Soft Law and Protective Regimes, 2012
- Cosmopolitan Justice and its Discontents (co-edited with Katja Franko Aas, Routledge 2011)
- Security: A Multidisciplinary Normative Approach (Brill 2009)
