= Ivar Frønes =

Norwegian sociologist

Ivar Frønes (born 2 August 1946 in Porsgrunn) is a Norwegian sociologist.

He graduated with a mag.art. degree (PhD equivalent) in 1975, and took the dr.philos. degree in 1995. He was hired at the University of Oslo in 1986 and is now professor.

== Selected bibliography ==
- De likeverdige - Om sosialisering og de jevnaldrendes betydning, 2006
- Mellom to kulturer, with Katrine Fangen, 2006
- Tegn tekst og samfunn, with Odd Are Berkaak, 2005
- Annerledeslandet, 2005
- Dialog, selv og samfunn, with Tone S. Wetlesen, 2004
- Det norske samfunn, co-editor with Lise Kjølsrød, 2003
- Digitale skiller, 2002
- Handling, kultur og mening, 2001
- På sporet av den nye tid, 2000
- Among Peers, 1995
