= Dag Thorkildsen =

- Born: 12 August 1951 (age 75)

Academic background
- Education: University of Oslo

Academic work
- Discipline: history
- Main interests: Norwegian and Nordic history and church history

Dag Thorkildsen (born 12 August 1951 in Oslo) is a Norwegian theologian, Lutheran minister, and academic. He is Professor Emeritus, University of Oslo, Faculty of Theology. He received his cand. theol. from the Faculty of Theology, University of Oslo, in 1977 and took his exam in practical theology at the same place in 1978. He was ordained in Hamar Cathedral on 19 December 1978. Thorkildsen worked as a vicar and seamen's chaplain 1979–80. From 1980 to 1989 he was a research assistant and vicar teaching assistant of Christian science of the Faculty of History and Philosophy at the University of Oslo. Thorkildsen argued for his doctorate in theology in 1989 with work on the Church and the dissolution of the union between Norway and Sweden (1905).

The main points of his research lie in Norwegian and Nordic history and church history after the reformation, particularly the Church's role in Nordic nation-building in the 1800s and 1900s. He has worked on nationalism theory, the religious events of the 1800s, Grundtvigianism and Danish nationalism, particularly on the relationship between state and church. He has also taken part in many Nordic research projects in these fields.
