= Jan-Paul Brekke =

Norwegian sociologist and comedian

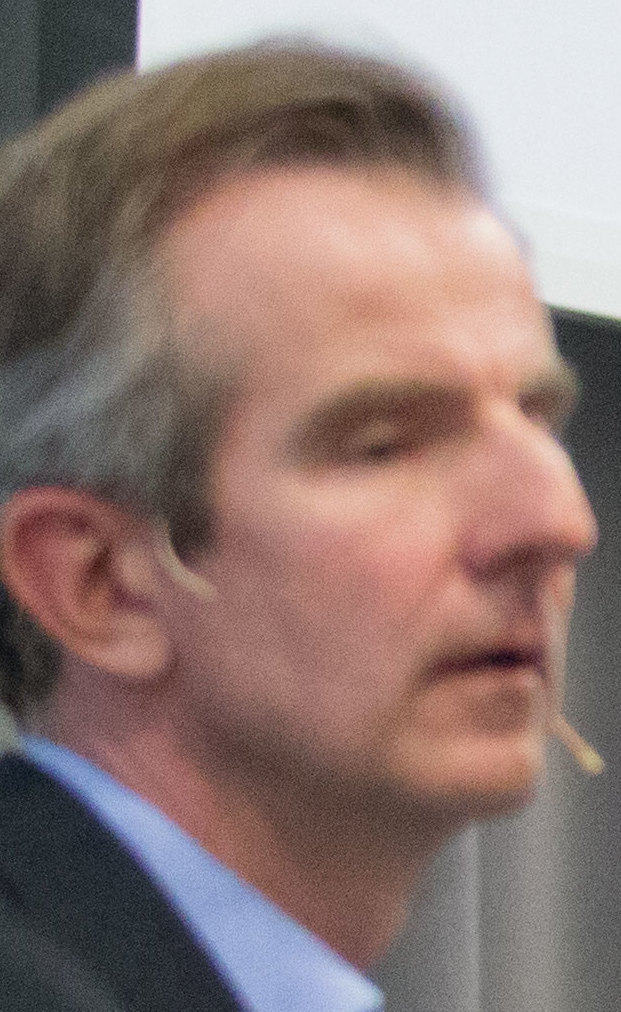
- Jan-Paul Brekke in 2017.
- Born: March 16, 1966 (age 60)
- Occupations: Sociologist and comedian
- Spouse: Tine Mørch Smith

Academic work
- Institutions: Norwegian Institute for Social Research
- Main interests: Migration, refugees, sociology of sport
- Notable works: Life on Hold, Why Norway?: Understanding Asylum Destinations, Reception Conditions for Asylum Seekers in Norway and the EU

Jan-Paul Brekke (born 19 March 1966) is a Norwegian sociologist and comedian. He currently works as a senior researcher at the Norwegian Institute for Social Research. His fields of research are migration and refugees, and sociology of sport. Since 2003, he has also been a regular panel member on the nationally broadcast TV show Løvebakken. He is a member of the comedy troupe Teatersport Oslo, together with Harald Eia, Helen Vikstvedt and Torbjørn Harr. They won the Norwegian championship in Theatresports in 1994.

== Personal life ==
Brekke is married to Tine Mørch Smith, who since 2010 has been Deputy Permanent Representative of Norway to the United Nations in New York. They have three children.

== Publications ==
- 2010 Life on Hold
- 2009 (with Monica Five Aarset). Why Norway?: Understanding Asylum Destinations. Oslo: Institute for Social Research,ISBN 9788277633060
- 2007 Reception Conditions for Asylum Seekers in Norway and the EU. Oslo: Institute for Social Research, 2007. ISBN 9788277632438
- 2007 (with Tordis Borchgrevink) Talking about integration: discources, alliances and theories on labour market integration in Sweden
- 2006 International students and immigration to Norway
- 2006 Utestengt fra velferdsstaten
- 2005 Humanitet eller null-tolerans
- 2004 While We Are Waiting: Uncertainty and Empowerment Among Asylum-Seekers in Sweden. Oslo, Norway: Institute for Social Research, ISBN 9788277631981.
- 2004 The Struggle for Control: The Impact of National Control Policies on the Arrival of Asylum Seekers to Scandinavia 1999-2004. Oslo, Norway: Institute for Social Research, ISBN 9788277632018
- 2002 Samtalekulturen i diplomatiet
- 2002 Children and Adolescents with an Immigrant Background: An Overview of Nordic Research. Kbh: Nordic Council of Ministers, ISBN 9789289308366.
- 2002 Kosovo-Norge, tur og retur: midlertidig opphold for kosovoflyktninger Oslo: Institutt for samfunnsforskning, ISBN 9788277631714
- 2001 Velkommen og farvel? : midlertidig beskyttelse for flyktninger i Norge. [Oslo]: Institutt for samfunnsforskning, ISBN 9788277631639
- 2001 "The Dilemmas of Temporary Protection – the Norwegian Experience" in Policy Studies, 22, no. 1 (2001): 5–18
- 1999 Midlertidig beskyttelse i Nordisk flyktningepolitikk
- 1999Barn og unge med innvandrerbakgrunn: en nordisk kunnskapsoversikt Kbh. : Nordisk Ministerråd, ISBN 9789289303187
- 1999 Barn og ungdoms levekår i Norden: en nordisk kunnskapsoversikt
- 1998 Et nytt flyktningregime? : om midlertidig beskyttelse i Norge
- 1995 Ansvar for andre: frivillighetssentralen i velferdspolitikken
- 1994 Frivillighet og lokalsamfunn: En studie av to frivillighetssentralers omgivelser.
