= Lise Kjølsrød =

Norwegian sociologist

Lise Kjølsrød (born 1949) is a Norwegian sociologist, specialising in the sociology of medical care.

She graduated from the University of Oslo with a mag.art. degree (PhD equivalent) in 1978, and took the dr.philos. degree in 1992. She worked as a research assistant at the University of Oslo from 1978, and as a scholarship holder at Norges almenvitenskapelige forskningsråd from 1986. From 1988 to 1990 she was a bureucreat in the Norwegian Ministry of Finance. She then became amanuensis at the University of Oslo in 1990, and researcher at the Institute for Social Research from 1991. She then returned to the University of Oslo to become associate professor from 1995 and finally professor from 2005. She is co-editor of Acta Sociologica.
