= Sverre Dick Henriksen =

Norwegian professor of medicine (1906–2001)

- Born: 1 November 1906; Skien, Norway
- Died: 22 December 2001 (aged 95)
- Citizenship: Norwegian
- Education: University of Oslo
- Scientific career
- Fields: microbiology immunology immunochemistry
- Workplaces: Rikshospitalet (1945–1949, 1955–1964, 1965–1977); Norwegian Institute of Public Health (1949–1945); University of Oslo (1955–1977); National Medical Center in Seoul (1964–1965)

Sverre Dick Henriksen (1 November 1906 – 22 December 2001) was a Norwegian professor of medicine.

== Biography ==
He was born in Skien, and took his examen artium in 1925. The cand.med. degree at the University of Oslo followed in 1931, and from 1931 to 1933 he worked at various Norwegian hospitals. After starting a specialist education in microbiology in 1933, at the Bacteriological Laboratory of the Norwegian Armed Forces, he took the dr.med. degree in 1936 on the thesis Studies on the Bacterial Flora of the Respiratory Tract in Acute and Chronic Bronchitis, Bronchial Asthma and Lung Gangrene. He spent the period 1937 to 1938 as research assistant on an expedition to Tristan da Cunha in the South Atlantic, and 1939 to 1941 at Columbia University in the United States. He did not return to German-occupied Norway after the 1940 invasion, but worked in the exiled Norwegian medical corps in Toronto (1941–1943) and London (1943–1945). For his war-time efforts he was awarded the Defence Medal 1940 – 1945.

After the war, in 1945, he was hired at Rikshospitalet in Oslo, at the department Kaptein W. Wilhelmsen og frues bakteriologiske institutt. He served as the State Physician of Epidemics at the Norwegian Institute of Public Health from 1949 to 1955, then was professor of bacteriology (also called medicinal microbiology) at the University of Oslo from 1955 to 1977. He spent time from 1964 to 1965 as chief physician at the National Medical Center in Seoul. He has been credited with opening the department for virology during his time as professor. In his own research he concentrated on immunochemistry. He was a member of the Norwegian Academy of Science and Letters and an honorary member of the Korean Medical Association and the Polish Chamber of Physicians and Dentists, and was decorated as a Knight of the Royal Norwegian Order of St. Olav. He wrote a total of 170 academic articles. He died in December 2001.
