= Obiora Chinedu Okafor =

Canadian lawyer

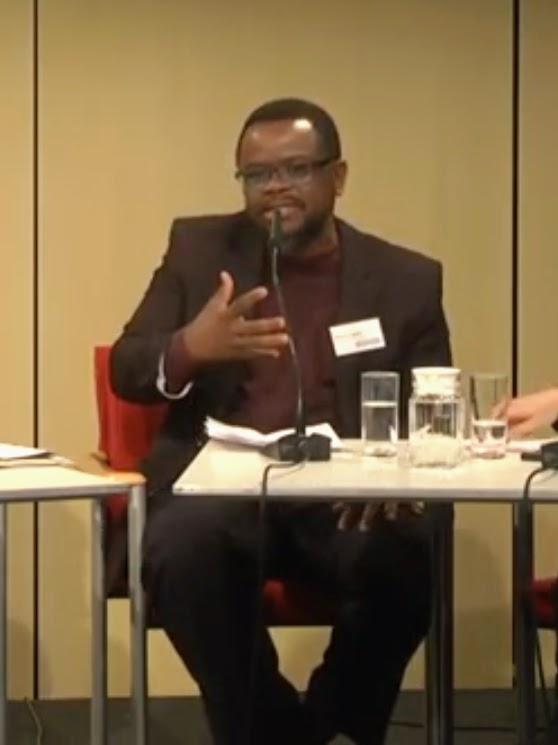
Obiora Chinedu Okafor, 2018

Obiora Chinedu Okafor is a Canadian lawyer, who became the York Research Chair at Osgoode Hall Law School, York University, and the Gani Fawehinmi Distinguished Chair of Human Rights Law at Nigerian Institute of Advanced Legal Studies. He became the United Nations Independent Expert on Human Rights and International Solidarity in June 2017, a position he held for five years.

Okafor had an advisory committee for his role as UN Independent Expert. In 2022 it was chaired by the Norwegian Professor Cecilia M. Bailliet who succeeded him as United Nations Independent Expert.
