= Tone Sverdrup =

Norwegian jurist

Tone Sverdrup (born 15 January 1951) is a Norwegian jurist.

She was born in Oslo. She took the siv.øk. degree, and also graduated as cand.jur. in 1977. She was a secretary in the Ministry of Local Government and Labour from 1974 to 1975 and as a consultant in the Ministry of Justice and the Police from 1977 to 1978. At the University of Oslo, she was a research assistant from 1975 to 1976, and also worked there from 1979 to 1980. From 1984 to 1986 she had a NAVF scholarship. She became an associate professor at the University of Oslo in 1988, and was promoted to professor in 2000. She took the dr.juris degree in 1997. Her field is private law. She has also been an acting Supreme Court Justice. She is a member of the Norwegian Academy of Science and Letters.
