= Vilhelm Aubert =

Norwegian sociologist (1922–1988)

- Born: 7 June 1922; Kristiania
- Died: 19 July 1988 (aged 66)
- Citizenship: Norwegian
- Scientific career
- Fields: sociology of law general sociology action research
- Workplaces: University of Oslo (1954–1988)

Johan Vilhelm Aubert (7 June 1922 – 19 July 1988) was an influential Norwegian sociologist. He was a professor at the Faculty of Law, University of Oslo from 1963 to 1971 and at the Department of Sociology from 1971 to 1988. He co-founded the Norwegian Institute for Social Research already in 1950, and has been labelled the "father of Norwegian sociology". In his early life he was a member of the anti-Nazi resistance group XU, and while later involved on the radical wing of the Labour Party, he edited the newspaper Orientering.

== Early career ==
Vilhelm Aubert was born in Kristiania in 1922. He was the older brother of mathematician Karl Egil Aubert, born 1924. Vilhelm Aubert enrolled at the University of Oslo in 1940, the same year as Norway was invaded by Germany as a part of the Second World War. Aubert became a member of the illegal intelligence organization XU.

Aubert finally graduated with the cand.jur. degree in 1946. He then lived in the United States for two years, studying sociology and psychology at Columbia and Berkeley. After returning to Norway, he was instrumental in the foundation and consolidation of social science research in Norway, a still fledgling field. He was a joint founder of the Norwegian Institute for Social Research (ISF, or Institutt for samfunnsforsking), an independent research institute in Oslo, along with Arne Næss, Eirik Rinde, and Stein Rokkan in 1950.

Aubert was a member of the Labour Party in his younger days. Situated on its left wing, he co-published the pamphlet Tenk en gang til. Tanker om fred og nedrustning in 1952, and was among the founders of the newspaper Orientering. He was the editor-in-chief of the newspaper for some time. The persons in and around this newspaper were excluded from the Labour Party in 1960, following a turbulent existence as an internal party opposition, especially in foreign policy issues. Some of the excluded members went on to found the Socialist People's Party, whereas Aubert left partisan politics to concentrate on an academic career. However, he continued his opposition towards nuclear arms.

== Later career ==
He took the doctor's degree in 1954, with the thesis Straffens sosiale funksjon (The Social Function of Punishment), which was also selected for the Norwegian Sociology Canon in 2009–2011. In it, he discussed the preventive nature of laws and punishment. In the same year he was hired as a lecturer at the University of Oslo. He was promoted to professor of the sociology of law in 1963. This institution was, and still is, a part of the Faculty of Law. Books in the field of sociology of law include Likhet og rett (1963), Rettssosiologi (1968) and Rettens sosiale funksjon (1976). Continuity and Development in Law and Society was published posthumously in 1989.

He later moved to the Department of Sociology at the Faculty of Social Sciences at Blindern, as a professorship in general sociology was established in 1971. His textbook Sosiologi, published in 1964, was the authoritative introduction to sociology in Norway for many years. His book The Hidden Society from 1965 was inspired by symbolic interactionism and the Chicago school.

== Death and legacy ==
Aubert died in July 1988 during a hiking trip.

He held an honorary degree at the Faculty of Law of the University of Edinburgh, issued in 1971. He has been credited for his contributions to the sociology of law, and some have labelled him the "father of Norwegian sociology" in general.

Later researchers have noted his tendency to stress the importance of norms. He has been criticized for maintaining a thin line between research and activism in some of his works. Aubert's employment of action research has been attributed to his left-wing political stance.

== See also ==
- Sociology of law
