= Ulla-Britt Lilleaas =

Norwegian sociologist

Ulla-Britt Lilleaas (born 1944) is a Norwegian sociologist. She is Professor of Sociology at the University of Agder and director of its Centre for Gender and Equality. She formerly worked at the University of Oslo Department of Sociology and Human Geography. Her research fields are gender and gender equality, sociology of the body, and sociology of health and illness. She is also noted for works on the sociology of tiredness. The short film "Tempo" was based on her work. She was elected "sociologist of the year" by the Norwegian Sociological Association in 2004.

== Publications ==
- Lilleaas, U-B.& P.I.Fivel: Kvinners involvering i menns sykdom.
- Ellingsen, D.& U-B.Lilleaas: Regional identittet, religiøs orientering og ideologien om mors gode fire valg.
- Lilleaas, U-B. & D von Der Fehr: Embodied Habits – why are they so hard to change? Submitted Nordisk Sygeplejevitenskapelig Tidsskrift.
- Lilleaas, U-B.: Den sosiale kroppen, Tidsskrift for Sygeplejeforskning, 3 (13–20) 2008.
- Lilleaas, U-B.: Masculinity, sport and emotions. Men and Masculinities Sage, VOL 10 nr.1 2007.
- Lilleaas, U-B.: Det sterke kjønns sårbarhet. Sosiologisk tidsskrift: VOL.14,311- 325. Universitetsforlaget 2006.
- Lilleaas, U-B.: Kroppslig beredskap som vane. Sosiologisk tidsskrift, VOL 13, 183 – 198. 20005.
- Lilleaas, U-B.: Maskulinitet, sport og følelser. Kvinder, Køn & Forskning nr. 2-3/2004 s.34 – 48.
- Lilleaas, U-B.: Forholdet mellom etikk og politikk i feminististisk forskning. Kvinneforskning nr.2/2004 s. 53 – 67.
- Lilleaas, U-B: En kropp i ustand. Sosiologisk tidsskrift VOL 4, 251 – 264, 1996.
- Lilleaas, U-B.: Kropp, kjønn og arbeidsdeling. Materialisten VOL 22, 31–51, 1994.
- Ulla-Britt Lilleaas: Trøtthetens tid
