= Willy Pedersen =

Norwegian sociologist

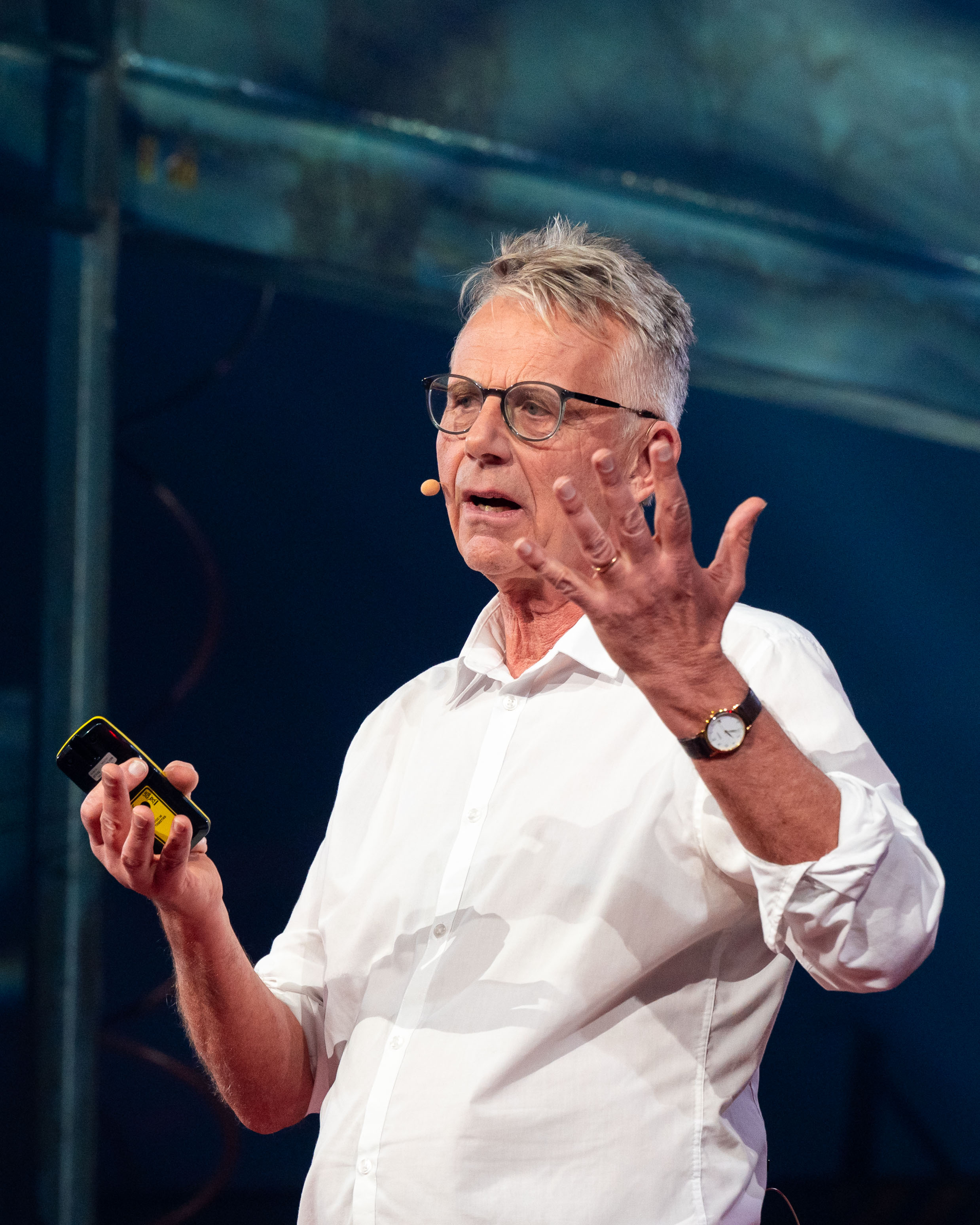
Image of Willy Pedersen

Willy Pedersen (born 24 October 1952) is a Norwegian sociologist. He is professor of sociology at the Department of Sociology and Human Geography, University of Oslo.

Pedersen received a Ph.D. in 1991 following the submission of a thesis entitled Drugs in Adolescent Worlds. He was engaged as professor of sociology at the University of Oslo in 2001.

He has worked on issues related to deviance, marginalization and culture with empirical research projects focusing on adolescence, alcohol and drugs, crime and sexuality. He has used longitudinal datasets as well as qualitative interviews and fieldwork methods in his research.

He has published a large number of articles in international peer-reviewed journals as well as a large number of books, mainly written in Norwegian. He published Street Capital: Black Cannabis Dealers in a White Welfare State (with Sveinung Sandberg) in 2009. He also writes for a number of Norwegian newspapers, including Aftenposten, Dagbladet and Morgenbladet. He has voiced support for the decriminalization of marijuana consumption in Norway. Pedersen became a fellow of the Norwegian Academy of Science and Letters in 2018.

== Selected bibliography ==
- Ungdom er bare et ord. Essays, 1994
- Bittersøtt – ungdom, sosialisering, rusmidler, 1998
- Noen spor, 2004 (with Erling Sandmo and Finn Skårderud)
- Nye seksualiteter, 2005
- Gatekapital, 2006 (with Sveinung Sandberg)
- Cannabiskultur, 2010 (with Sveinung Sandberg)
