= Erik Grønseth =

Norwegian sociologist (1925–2005)

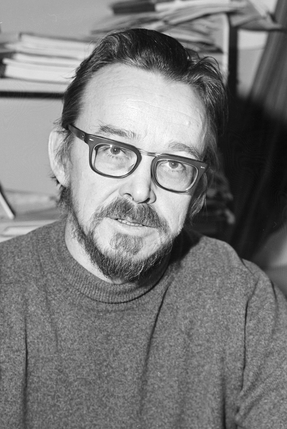
- Grønseth in 1972
- Born: 13 September 1925
- Died: 8 October 2005 (aged 80)
- Education: Wittenberg College; New School for Social Research; University of Wisconsin; University of Oslo
- Scientific career
- Fields: Sociology
- Workplaces: Norwegian Institute for Social Research; University of Oslo

Erik Grønseth (13 September 1925 – 8 October 2005) was a Norwegian sociologist, Professor of Sociology at the University of Oslo from 1971 to 1989, and "one of the post-war pioneers of sociology" in Norway. He is regarded as one of the founders of men's studies. Together with Harriet Holter, he is also considered the founder of Norwegian family sociology.

As a young man, he was introduced to Arne Næss, who encouraged him to study sociology. Following his studies at Wittenberg College, the New School for Social Research in New York City, the University of Wisconsin and the University of Oslo, he graduated with a master's degree in sociology at the University of Wisconsin in 1949 and a mag.art (PhD) degree in sociology at the University of Oslo in 1952.

From 1952 to 1963, he was a researcher at the Norwegian Institute for Social Research. He was then appointed as lecturer in sociology at the University of Oslo. He was appointed as professor of sociology in 1971.

He took an interest in family research already in the 1950s, and has published several books on family, gender roles, work, sexuality and society. In cooperation with developmental psychologist Per Olav Tiller he conducted a seminal study on father absence in sailor families and its impact on children's personality development during the 1950s and 1960s; the study was the first study on men in the Nordic countries. He continued his research on men, work and families, and in the early 1970s, he carried out a study on couples who shared their jobs, a study that attracted much media interest in Norway and abroad.

Grønseth's views on family and sexuality were considered "radical" in the 1960s; after an NRK interview in 1963, in which he advocated sex education, all the bishops of the state Church of Norway as well as 129,000 housewives signed a protest petition against him. However, many of his views were embraced by the feminist movement of the 1970s and today his once controversial views are considered mainstream in Norwegian politics.
