= Institute of Clinical Dentistry (Oslo) =

Part of the University of Oslo

Institute of Clinical Dentistry is of the two institutions at the Faculty of Dentistry at the University of Oslo

The institute serves more than 50,000 patients annually, and trains dental assistants, dentists and dental specialists, as well as PhD candidates.

The institute is divided into the following departments:

- Department of Biomaterials
- Department of Cardiology and gerontology
- Department of Community dentistry
- Department of Dental Pharmacology and Pharmacotherapy
- Department of Endodontics
- Department of Maxillofacial Radiology
- Department of Oral Surgery and Oral Medicine
- Department of Orthodontics
- Department of Pediatric Dentistry and Behavioural Science
- Department of Periodontology
- Department of Prosthodontics
