= Norwegian Institute for Social Research =

Norwegian social research institute

- Established: 1950; 76 years ago
- Field of research: Social science
- Director: Kyrre Lekve
- Location: Munthes gate 31, Oslo, Norway
- Website: www.samfunnsforskning.no

The Institute for Social Research (Norwegian: Institutt for samfunnsforskning, ISF) is an independent social science research institute based in Oslo, Norway.

It was founded in 1950 by Vilhelm Aubert, Arne Næss, Eirik Rinde, and Stein Rokkan. It publishes the journal Tidsskrift for samfunnsforskning.

The institute is organized into three research groups, each with its own research director. They are Politics, democracy and civil society (led by Johannes Bergh), Working life and welfare (led by Kjersti Misje Østbakken), and Gender equality, integration and migration (led by Jan-Paul Brekke). In addition, the institute has two affiliated research centers: Center for Research on Voluntary Sector and Civil Society and CORE - Center for Research on Gender Equality. In total, the institute has 65 employees.
