= University of Oslo =

Norwegian public research university

- Universitetet i Oslo
- Seal
- Latin: Universitas Osloensis
- Former name: Royal Frederick University (1811–1939)
- Type: Public research university
- Established: 2 September 1811; 215 years ago
- Academic affiliations: EUA, Guild of European Research-Intensive Universities, UNICA
- Rector: Ragnhild Hennum
- Faculty: 7,000 (2020)
- Administrative staff: 1,725 (2020)
- Students: 26,500 (2025)
- Location: Oslo, Norway; 59°56′23.77″N 10°43′19.43″E
- Colors
- Website: www.uio.no

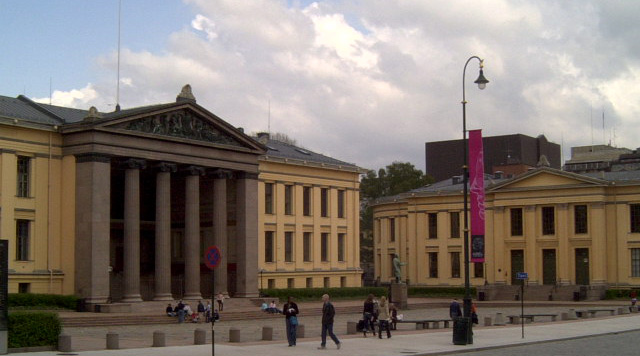
Central campus of the university, where today only the faculty of law is located. These buildings were inspired by the famous buildings of Prussian architect Karl Friedrich Schinkel in Berlin.

The University of Oslo (Norwegian: Universitetet i Oslo; Latin: Universitas Osloensis) is a public research university located in Oslo, Norway. It is the oldest university in Norway. Originally named the Royal Frederick University, the university was established in 1811 as the de facto Norwegian continuation of Denmark–Norway's common university, the University of Copenhagen, with which it shares many traditions. It was named for King Frederick VI of Denmark and Norway, and received its current name in 1939. The university was commonly nicknamed "The Royal Frederick's" (Det Kgl. Frederiks) before the name change, and informally also referred to simply as Universitetet (lit. 'the university').

The university was the only university in Norway until the University of Bergen was founded in 1946. It has approximately 27,700 students and employs around 6,000 people. Its faculties include (Lutheran) theology (with the Lutheran Church of Norway having been Norway's state church since 1536), law, medicine, humanities, mathematics, natural sciences, social sciences, dentistry, and education. The university's original neoclassical campus is located in the centre of Oslo; it is currently occupied by the Faculty of Law. Most of the university's other faculties are located at the newer Blindern campus in the suburban West End. The Faculty of Medicine is split between several university hospitals in the Oslo area. The university also includes some formally independent, affiliated institutes such as the Centre for International Climate and Environmental Research (CICERO), NKVTS and the Frisch Centre.

The Nobel Peace Prize was awarded in the university's Atrium, from 1947 to 1989 and in 2020. Since 2003, the Abel Prize is awarded in the Atrium. Five researchers affiliated with the university have been Nobel laureates and three have been Turing Award winners.

== History ==
=== Early history ===
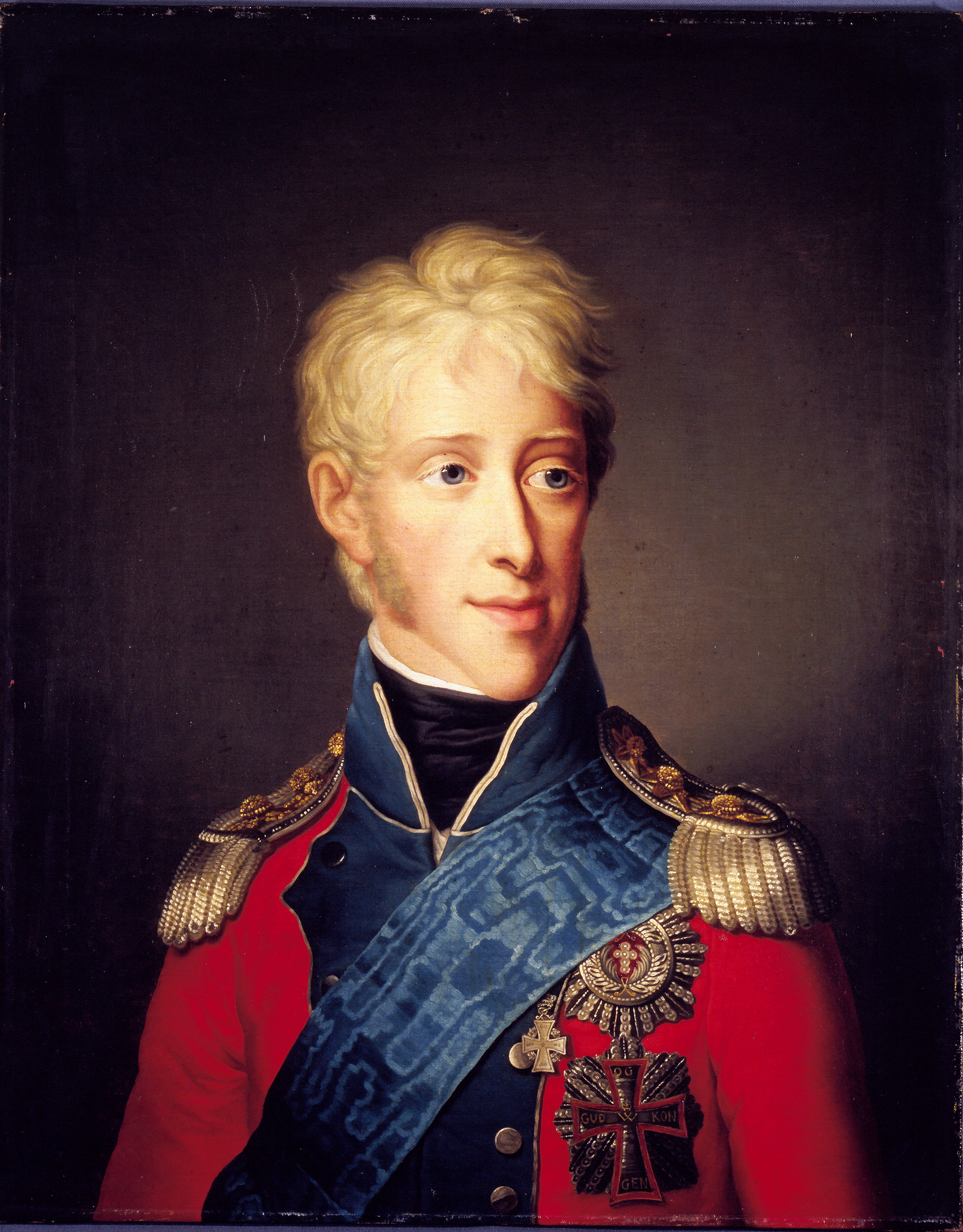
King Frederick VI of Denmark and Norway was the founder of the university.

In 1811, a decision was made to establish the first university in the Dano-Norwegian Union, after an agreement was reached with King Frederik VI, who had earlier believed that such an institution might encourage political separatist tendencies. In 1813, The Royal Frederik's University was founded in Christiania (now Oslo), a small city at that time. Circumstances then changed dramatically one year into the commencement of the university, as Norway proclaimed independence. However, independence was somewhat restricted, as Norway was obliged to enter into a personal union with Sweden based on the outcome of the Swedish-Norwegian War of 1814. Norway retained its own constitution and independent state institutions, although royal power and foreign affairs were shared with Sweden. At a time when Norwegians feared political domination by the Swedes, the new university became a key institution that contributed to Norwegian political and cultural independence.

The main initial function of The Royal Frederick University was to educate a new class of upper-echelon civil servants, as well as parliamentary representatives and government ministers. The university also became the centre for a survey of the country—a survey of culture, language, history and folk traditions. The staff of the university strove to undertake a wide range of tasks necessary for developing a modern society. Throughout the 1800s, the university's academic disciplines gradually became more specialised.

One of the major changes in the university came during the 1870s when a greater emphasis was placed upon research, the management of the university became more professional, academic subjects were reformed, and the forms of teaching evolved. Classical education came under increasing pressure.

When the union with Sweden was dissolved in 1905, the university became important for producing highly educated experts in a society which placed increasing emphasis on ensuring that all its citizens enjoy a life of dignity and security. Education, health services and public administration were among those fields that recruited personnel from the university's graduates.

=== 1900–1945 ===
Research changed qualitatively around the turn of the century as new methods, scientific theories and forms of practice changed the nature of research. It was decided that teachers should arrive at their posts as highly qualified academics and continue academic research alongside their role as teachers. Scientific research—whether to launch or test out new theories, to innovate or to pave the way for discoveries across a wide range of disciplines—became part of the increased expectations placed on the university. Developments in society created a need for more and more specialised and practical knowledge, not merely competence in theology or law, for example. The university strove to meet these expectations through increasing academic specialisation.

The position of rector was established by Parliament in 1905 following the Dissolution of the Union. Waldemar Christofer Brøgger was Professor of Geology and became the university's first rector. Brøgger vacillated between a certain pessimism and a powerfully energetic attitude regarding how to procure finances for research and fulfill his more general funding objectives. With the establishment of the national research council after World War II, Brøgger's vision was largely fulfilled; research received funding independent of teaching. This coincided with a massive rise in student enrollment during the 1960s, which again made it difficult to balance research with the demands for teaching. In the years leading up to 1940, research was more strongly linked with the growth of the nation, with progress and self-assertion; research was also seen to contribute to Norway's commitment to international academic and cultural development.

During the period after World War I, research among Norwegian researchers resulted in two Nobel prizes. The Nobel prize in Economics was awarded to Ragnar Frisch. The Nobel prize in Chemistry was awarded to Odd Hassel. In the field of linguistics, several Norwegian researchers distinguished themselves internationally. Increased research activity during the first half of the 1900s was part of an international development that also included Norway. Student enrollment doubled between 1911 and 1940, and students were recruited from increasingly broad geographical, gender and social bases. The working class was still largely left behind, however.

During the German occupation, which lasted from 1940 to 1945, the university rector, Didrik Arup Seip, was imprisoned. The university was then placed under the management of Adolf Hoel, a NS (Norwegian Nazi Party) appointee. A number of students participated in the Norwegian resistance movement; after fire was set in the university auditorium, Reich Commissar Terboven ordered the university closed and the students arrested. A number of students and teachers were detained by the Germans nearly until the end of the war.

=== 1945–2000 ===
After WWII, public authorities made loans available to students whose families were unable to provide financial assistance; the State Educational Loan Fund for Young Students was established in 1947. As a result, the post-war years saw a record increase in student numbers. Many of these students had been unable to begin their studies or had seen their studies interrupted because of the war; they could now enroll. For the 1945 autumn semester, 5951 students registered at the university. This represented the highest student enrollment at UiO up to that time. In 1947, the number had risen to more than 6000 students. This represented a 50 per cent increase in the number of students compared to the number enrolled before the war.

In no prior period had one decade brought so many changes for the university as the 1960s. The decade represented an unparalleled period of growth. From 1960 to 1970, student enrollment tripled, rising from 5,600 to 16,800. This tremendous influx would have been enough in itself to transform the way the university was perceived, from both the inside and the outside. As it turned out, the changes were even more comprehensive. The university campus at Blindern was expanded, and the number of academic and administrative employees rose. The number of academic positions doubled, from fewer than 500 to around 1,200. The increase in the number of students and staff transformed traditional forms of work and organisation. The expansion of the Blindern complex allowed the accommodation of 7,000 students. The explosive rise in student numbers during the 1960s impacted the Blindern campus in particular. The faculties situated in central Oslo—Law and Medicine—experienced only a doubling in student enrollment during the 1960s, while the number of students in the humanities and social sciences tripled.

By 1968, revolutionary political ideas had taken root in earnest among university students. The "Student Uprising" became a turning point in the history of universities throughout the western world. Often, the outlook for students in the 1960s was bleak. More than ever before came from non-academic backgrounds and had few role models. The "University of the Masses" was unable to lift all its students to the "lofty, elite positions" enjoyed by prior generations of academics. Many students dissociated themselves, therefore, from the so-called "establishment" and from the way it functioned. Many were impatient and wanted to use their knowledge to change society. It was thought that academics should stand in solidarity with the underprivileged.

The most fundamental change in the student population was the increasing proportion of female students. Throughout the 1970s, the number of women increased until it made up the majority of students. At the same time, the university became a centre for the organised women's liberation movement, which emerged in the 1970s.

Up until the millennium, the number of students enrolled at the university rose exponentially. In 1992, UiO implemented a restriction on admissions for all of its faculties for the first time. A large part of the explanation for the high student numbers was thought to be found in the poor job market. In 1996, there were 38,265 students enrolled at UiO. This level was approximately 75 per cent above the average during the 1970s and 1980s. The strong rise in student numbers during the 1990s was attributed partly to the poor labour market.

== Hierarchy ==
The highest position at the university is Professor, i.e. "full Professor." In Norway, the title "Professor," which is protected by law, is only used for full professors. Before 1990, all professors were appointed for life to their chairs by the King-in-Council, i.e. by the King upon the advice of the Cabinet. The position below Professor was historically Docent (translated as Reader in a UK context and Professor in an American context). In 1985, all Docents became full professors. The most common positions below that are førsteamanuensis (translated as Associate Professor), and amanuensis or universitetslektor (translated as Lecturer or Assistant Professor). At the University of Oslo, almost all new permanent positions are announced at the Associate Professor level; an associate professor may apply for promotion to full professor if he or she holds the necessary competence.

Additionally, there are temporary, qualifying positions such as stipendiat (Research Fellow) and postdoktor (Postdoctoral Fellow).

A small number of employees with few or no teaching obligations hold the special research career pathway ranks researcher, senior researcher and research professor, which correspond to assistant professor, associate professor and professor, respectively.

Several other less common academic positions also exist. Historically, only professors had the right to vote and be represented in the governing bodies of the university. Originally, all professors were automatically members of the Collegium Academicum, the highest governing body of the university, but soon afterwards its membership was limited. Docents were granted the right to vote and be represented in 1939 and other academics and students in 1955. In 1975, the technical-administrative support staff was also granted the right to vote and be represented in certain bodies, as the last group. Formerly by law, and now by tradition, the highest positions, such as Rector or Dean, are only held by professors. They are elected by the academic community (academics and students) and by the technical-administrative support staff, but the votes of the academics carry significantly more weight.

== Faculties ==
The university's research structure consists of eight schools, or "faculties." They are the Faculties of Dentistry, Educational Sciences, Humanities, Law, Mathematics and Natural Sciences, Medicine, Social Sciences and Theology.

The university's old campus, strongly influenced by Prussian architect Karl Friedrich Schinkel's neoclassical style, is located in the centre of Oslo near the National Theatre, the Royal Palace and the Parliament. The old campus was then occupied by the Faculty of Law and most of the other faculties have been transferred to the Blindern campus in the suburban West End, erected in the 1930s. The Faculty of Medicine is split between several university hospitals in the Oslo area.

=== Theology ===
The Faculty of Theology sponsors 8 research groups in the following fields:

- The New Testament
- Historical Protestantism
- Interreligious studies
- Jewish Religion and Literature in Persian and Hellenistic Periods
- Canon and Canonicalization
- Gender, Theology and Religion
- Professional Ethics, Diaconal Science and Practical Theology
- Religious Esthetics

=== Law ===
- Centre for European Law
- Department of Criminology and the Sociology of Law
- Department of Private Law
- Norwegian Research Center for Computers and Law (NRCCL)
- Department of Public and International Law
- Norwegian Centre for Human Rights
- Scandinavian Institute of Maritime Law

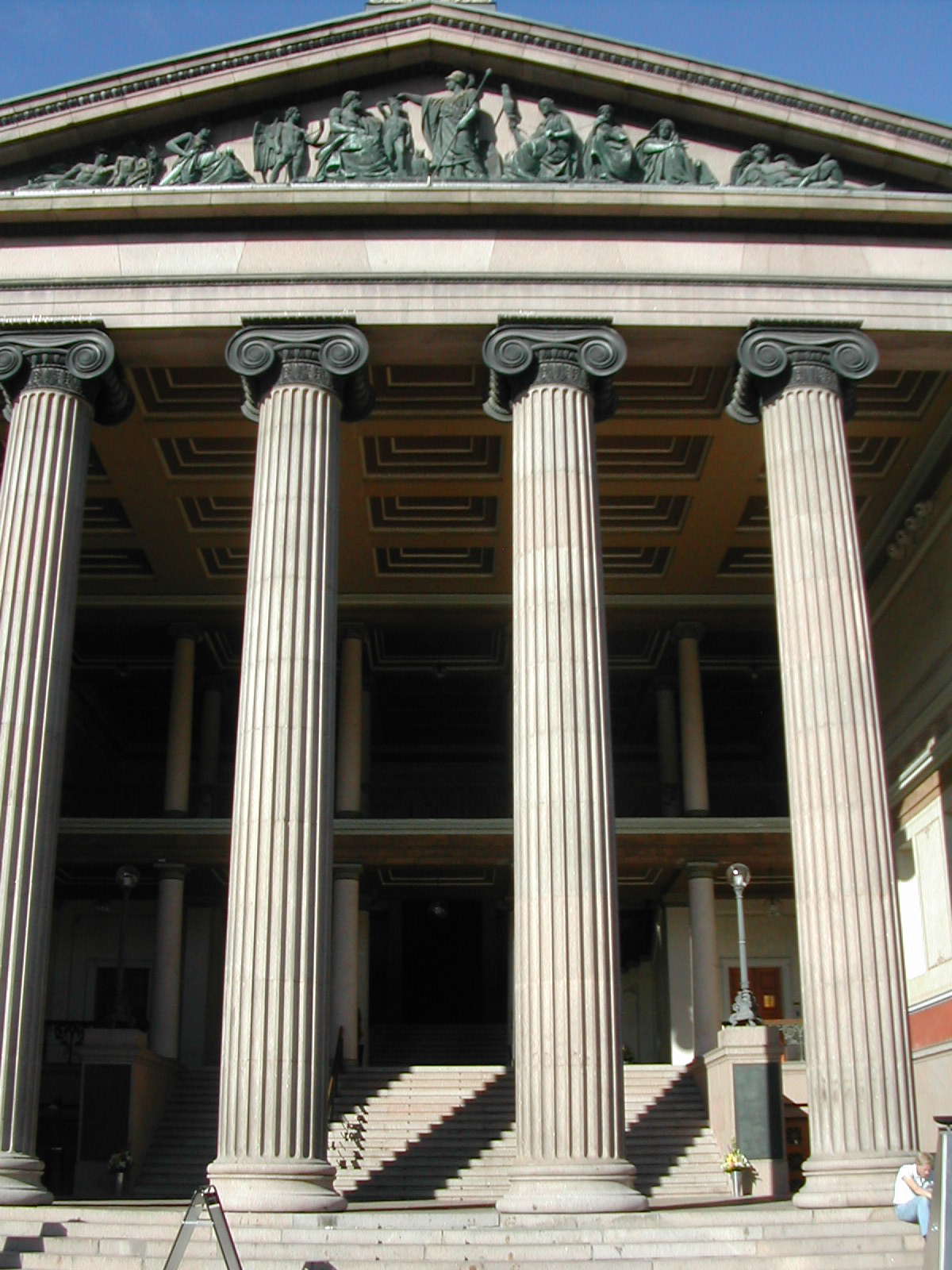
The Faculty of Law. The Nobel Peace Prize was awarded in this building until 1989.

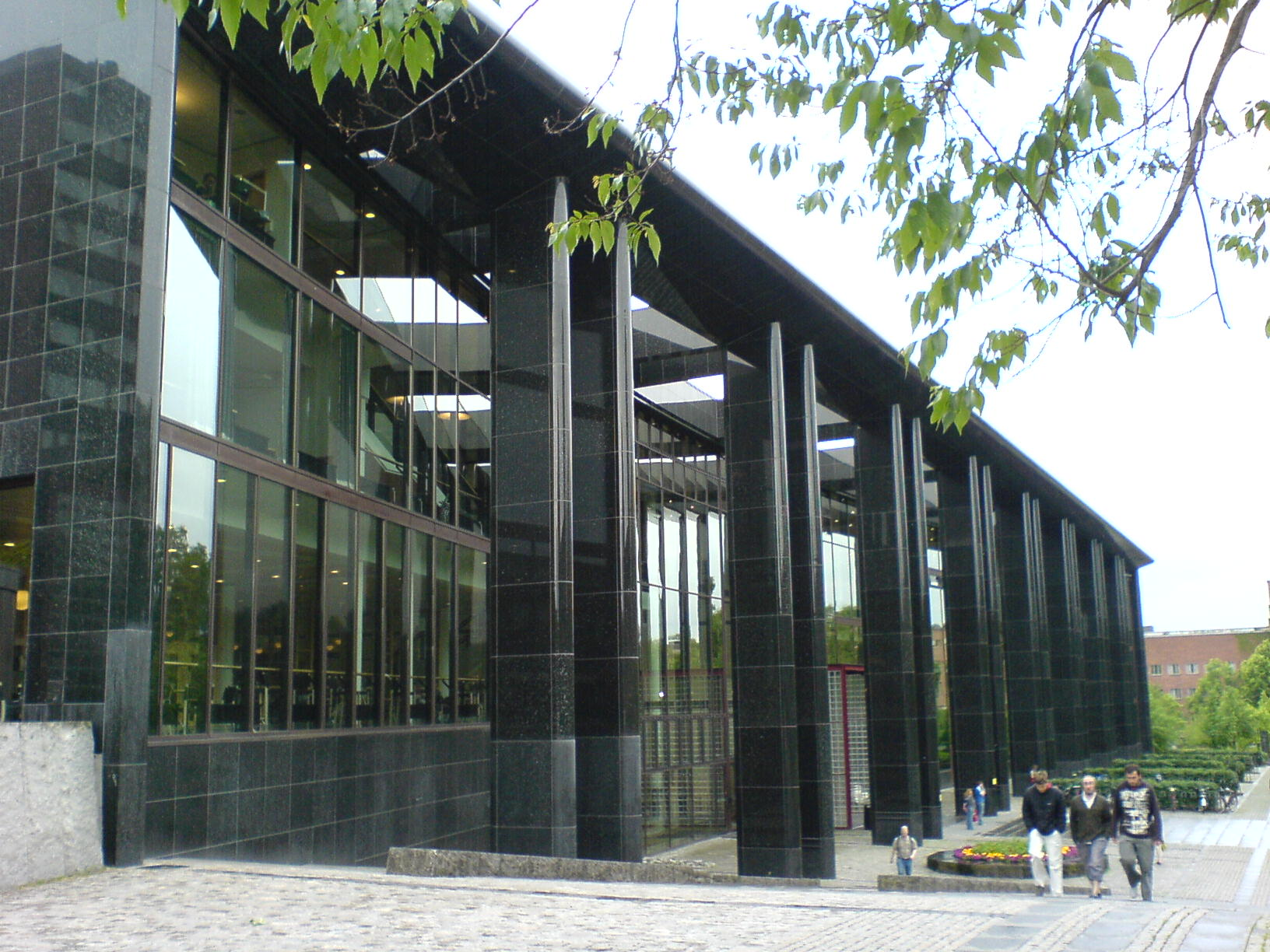
The library building at the Blindern campus, houses the Library of Arts and Social Sciences.

=== Medicine ===
- Institute of Health and Society
- Institute of Basic Medical Sciences
- Institute of Clinical Medicine

Centres of Excellence:

- Norwegian Centre for Mental Disorders Research (NORMENT)
- Centre for Immune Regulation (CIR)
- Centre for Cancer Biomedicine (CCB)

=== Humanities ===
The Faculty of Humanities is the University of Oslo's largest faculty, and has approximately 8000 students and 917 employees.

- Department of Archaeology, Conservation and History
- Department of Cultural Studies and Oriental Languages
- Department of Philosophy, Classics, History of Art and Ideas
- Department of Literature, Area Studies and European Languages
- Department of Linguistics and Scandinavian Studies
- Department of Media and Communication
- Department of Musicology
- Centre for Ibsen Studies
- Centre for the Study of Mind in Nature
- The Norwegian University Centre in St. Petersburg
- The Norwegian Institute in Rome
- Centre for French-Norwegian research cooperation within the social sciences and the humanities
- Center for Development and Environment

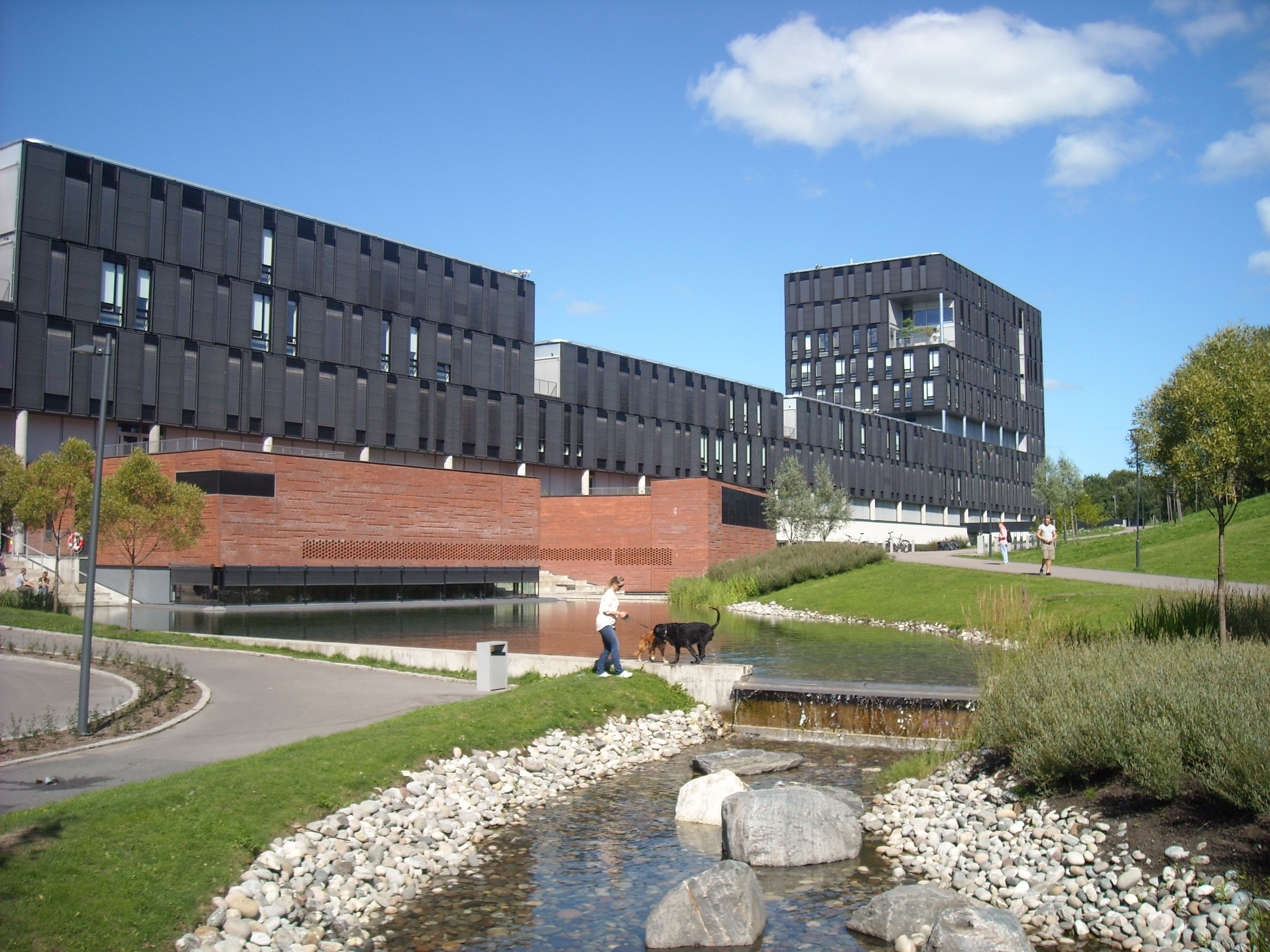
The Ole-Johan Dahl building houses the Department of Informatics.

=== Mathematics and natural sciences ===
- Department of Biosciences
- Department of Chemistry
- Department of Geosciences
- Department of Informatics
- Department of Mathematics
- Department of Physics
- Institute of Theoretical Astrophysics
- Department of Pharmacy
- Department of Technology Systems
- Centre for Entrepreneurship
- Centre for Earth Evolution and Dynamics (CEED)
- Centre for Material sciences and Nanotechnology (SMN)
- Centre of Mathematics for Applications (CMA)
- Centre for Ecological and Evolutionary Synthesis (CEES)
- Centre for Theoretical and Computational Chemistry (CTCC)
- Centre for Innovative Natural Gass Processes and Products (inGAP)
- Centre for Accelerator Based Research and Energy Physics (SAFE)

=== Dentistry ===
- Institute of Oral Biology
- Institute of Clinical Dentistry

=== Social sciences ===
- Department of Sociology and Human Geography
- Department of Political Science
- Department of Psychology
- Department of Social Anthropology
- Department of Economics
- Centre for technology, innovation and culture
- ARENA – Centre for European Studies
- Centre of Equality, Social Organization, and Performance (ESOP)

=== Education ===
- Department of Teacher Education and School Research
- Department of Special Needs Education
- Department for Educational Research
- Centre for Educational Measurement at the University of Oslo (CEMO)
- InterMedia

== Other units ==
The University of Oslo has several units which are not part of one of the faculties, including some interdisciplinary research centres, research centres abroad, the scientific museums, and libraries:

=== Research centres and other special units ===
- The Biotechnology Centre of Oslo
- Centre for Gender Research
- Norwegian Institute in Rome (wholly owned by the university)
- Barony Rosendal (wholly owned by the university)
- Molecular Life Science
- International Summer School

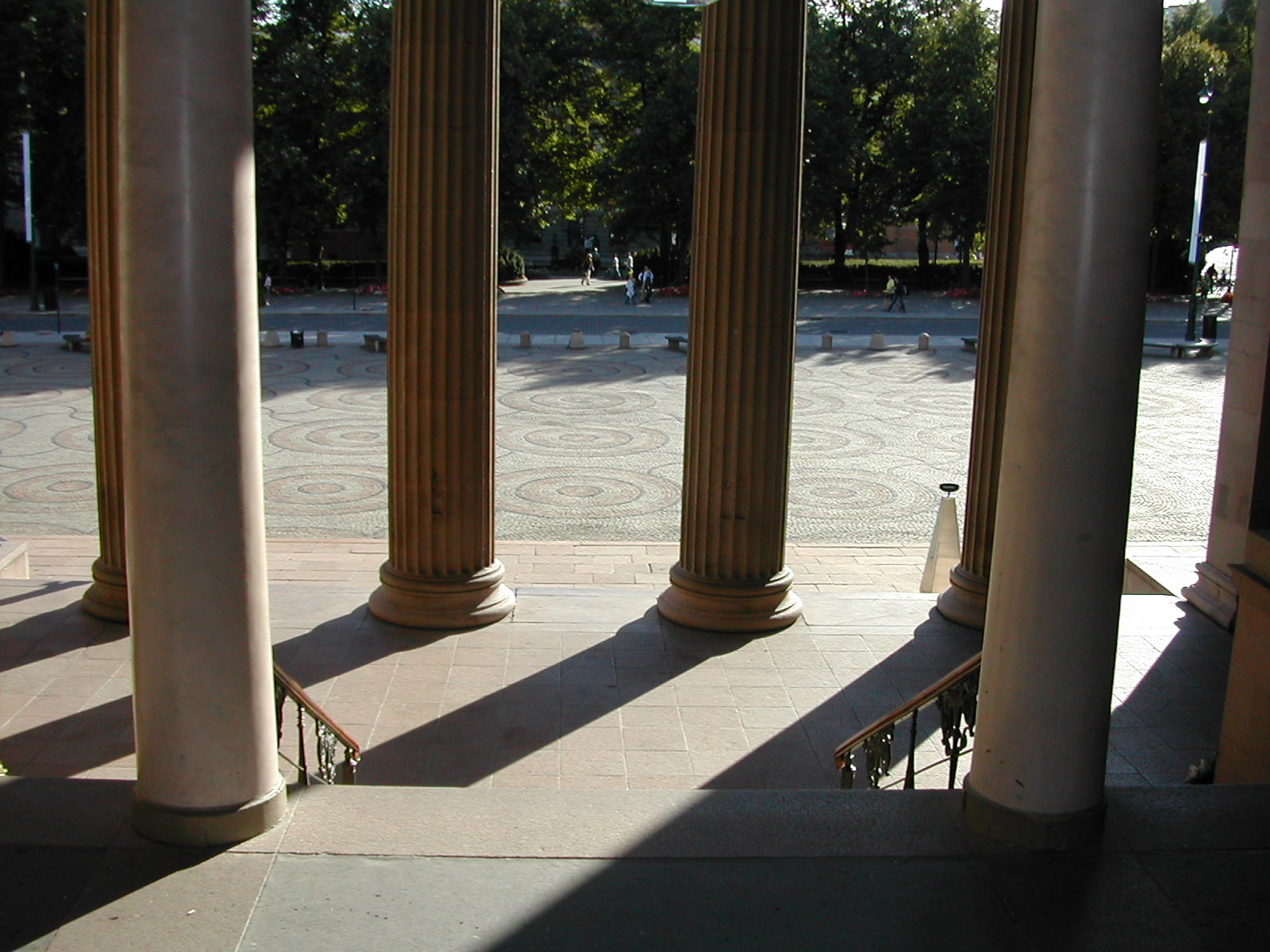
Stairs leading from Faculty of Law's Domus Media to University Square on Karl Johan's Street

=== Affiliated institutes ===
Affiliated institutes are independent institutes that have a formal cooperation agreement with and close ties to the University of Oslo. Most of them were established by the University of Oslo, but have been organised as entities formally separate from the university for various reasons.

- Centre for International Climate and Environmental Research
- Frisch Centre
- Norwegian Centre for Violence and Traumatic Stress Studies
- Center for Studies of the Holocaust and Religious Minorities
- Simula Research Laboratory

=== Library ===
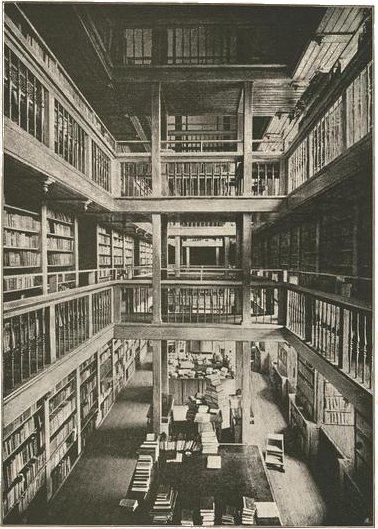
Former University Library reading room

- Library of Medicine and Health Sciences
- Library of Humanities and Social Sciences
- Faculty of Law Library
- Faculty of Mathematics and Natural Sciences Library

=== Museums ===
Natural history

- Mineralogical-geological Museum
- Paleontological Museum
- Zoological Museum
- Botanical Garden
- Botanical Museum

Cultural history

- Historical Museum
- Collection of Coins and Medals
- Ethnographic Museum
- Viking Ship Museum

== Notable people ==
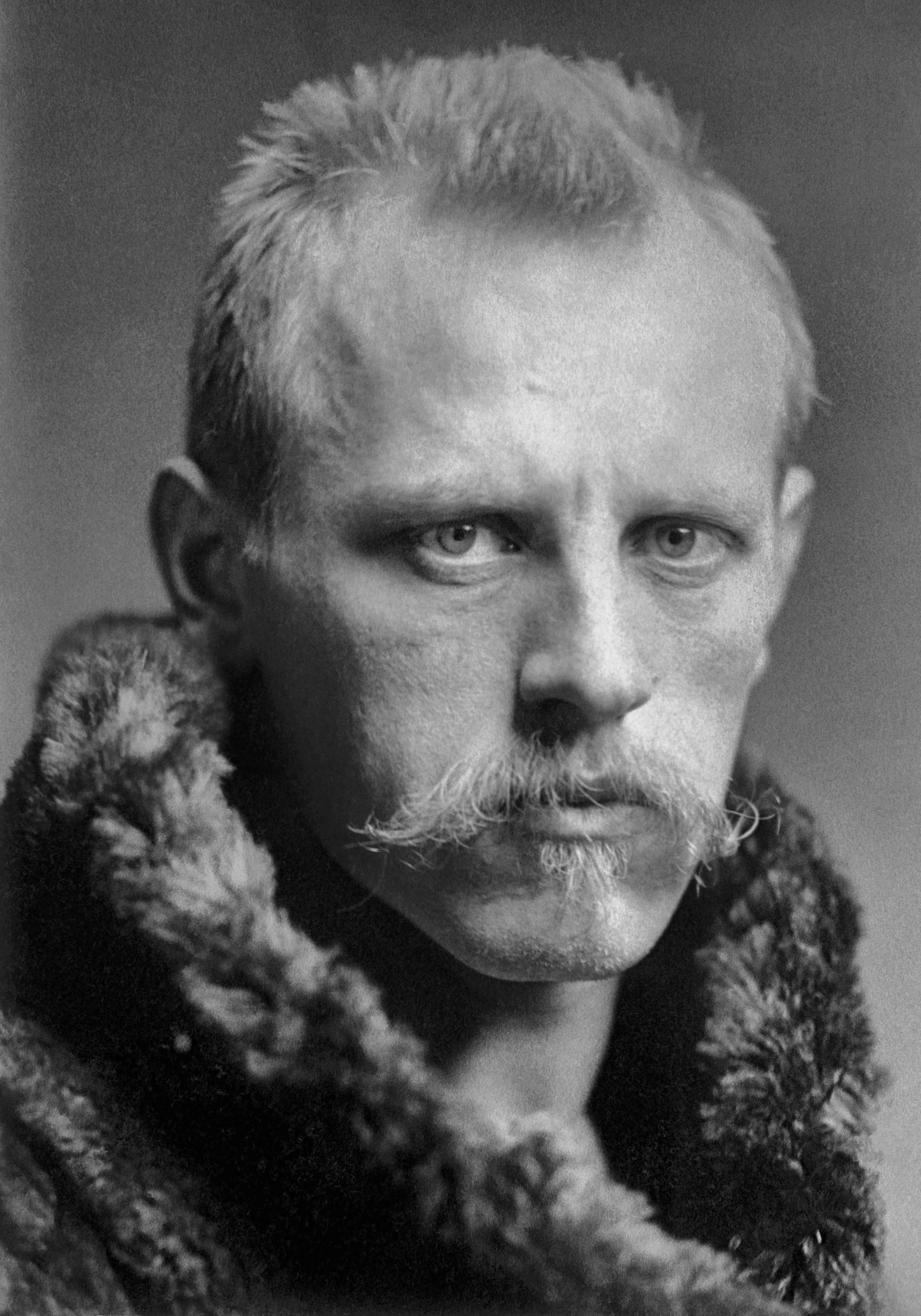
Fridtjof Nansen was Professor of Zoology and Rector-elect, and was also known as an explorer, humanitarian and recipient of the Nobel Peace Prize

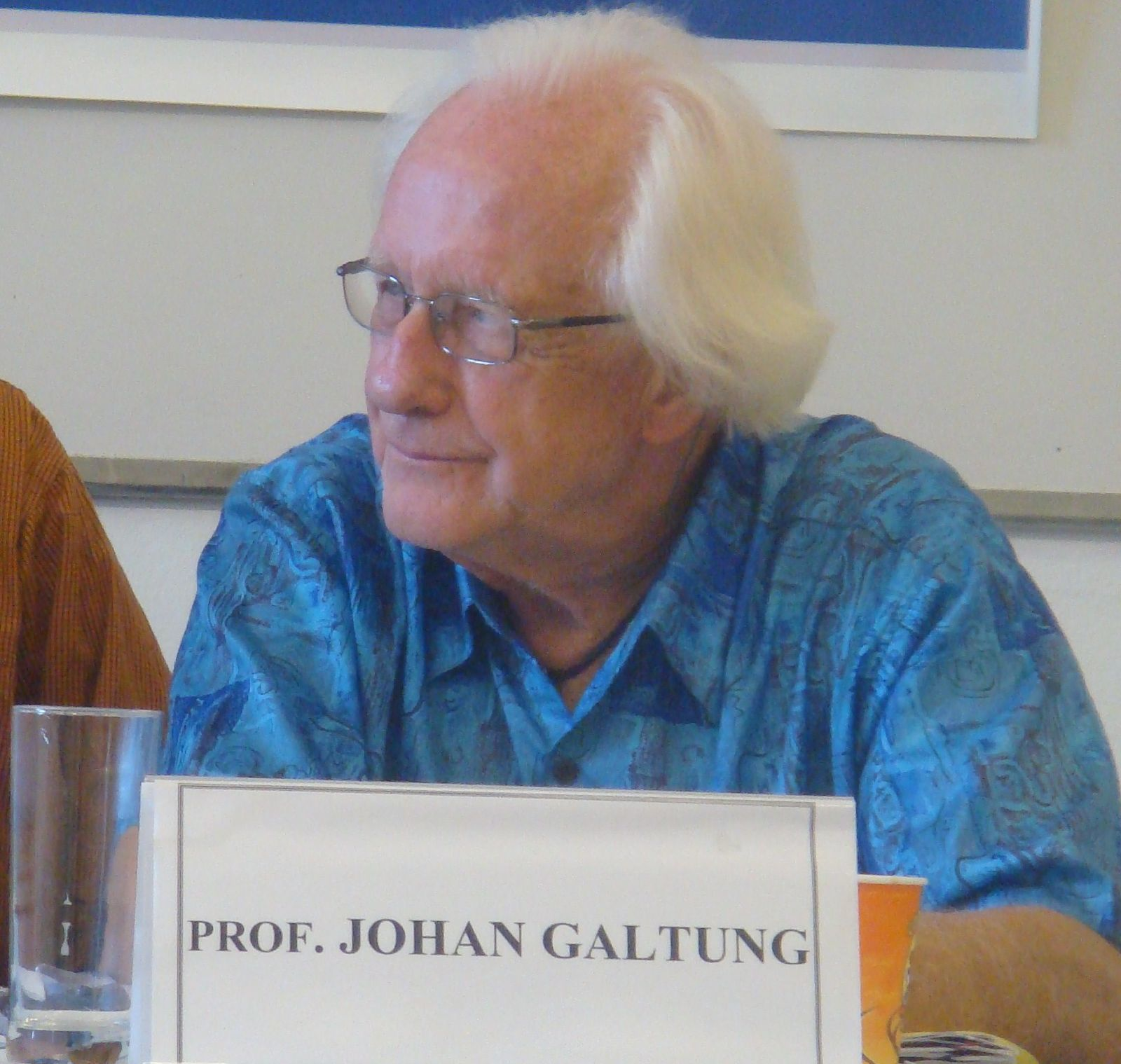
Johan Galtung, the founder of peace and conflict studies, held the world's first chair in that discipline at the University of Oslo 1969–1977

The University of Oslo has a long list of notable academics and alumni, spanning the fields of scholarship covered by the university. The university is home to five Nobel Prize winners and is institutionally tied to some of the most prestigious prizes in the world. The Nobel Peace Prize was awarded in the university's atrium between 1947 and 1989, thus making it the only university to host a Nobel Prize ceremony. Since 2003, the Abel Prize is awarded in the university's atrium.

=== Academics ===
Some of the notable academics of the university are:

- Vilhelm Aubert (Professor of Sociology)
- Cecilia Bailliet (Professor of Law) and UN special rapporteur on human rights
- Fredrik Barth (Professor of Social Anthropology)
- Jon Bing (Professor of Law; pioneer of legal informatics)
- Nils Christie (Professor of Criminology)
- Ole-Johan Dahl (Professor of Computer Science)
- Tove Stang Dahl (Professor of Law; pioneer of feminist jurisprudence)
- Ivar Giæver (Professor of Physics)
- Johan Galtung (Professor of Peace and Conflict Studies; founder of the field)
- Victor Goldschmidt (Professor of Mineralogy and Petrography, founder of geochemistry and crystal chemistry)
- Erik Grønseth (Professor of Sociology; founder of Norwegian family sociology)
- Francis Hagerup (Professor of Law)
- Viggo Hagstrøm (Professor of Law)
- Odd Hassel (Professor of Chemistry)
- Harriet Holter (Professor of Social Psychology)
- Trygve Haavelmo (Professor of Economics)
- Thomas Mathiesen (Professor of Sociology)
- Fridtjof Nansen (Professor of Zoology)
- Arnved Nedkvitne (Professor of History)
- Arne Næss (Professor of Philosophy; founder of deep ecology)
- Kristen Nygaard (Professor of Computer Science)
- Trygve Reenskaug (Professor of Informatics)
- Vibeke Roggen (Associate Professor of Classics)
- Sophus Lie (Professor of Mathematics, pioneer in abstract algebra; largely created the theory of continuous symmetry)
- Ragnhild Sollund (Professor of Criminology)
- Peter Ludwig Mejdell Sylow (Professor of Mathematics)
- Carl Marstrander (Professor of Celtic Languages)
- Georg Morgenstierne (Professor of Linguistics)

=== Alumni ===
- Niels Henrik Abel (1802–1829) – mathematician, the Abel Prize in mathematics is named in his honour
- Gro Harlem Brundtland – former prime minister of Norway
- Øyvind Ellingsen (born 1952) – Norwegian cardiologist
- Elisabeth Erke (born 1962) – Norwegian Sami educator and politician
- Åse Kleveland – Norwegian singer and politician
- Fridtjof Nansen – Arctic explorer and Nobel Prize laureate
- Harrison Schmitt – former American astronaut, walked on the Moon during Apollo 17
- Petrit Selimi – deputy minister of foreign affairs of Kosovo
- Baldwin Spencer – prime minister of Antigua and Barbuda
- Jens Stoltenberg – former prime minister of Norway and secretary general of NATO
- Andreas Thorud – footballer
- Olav Torgersen (1907 – 1978) – physician, pathologist and academic
- Thor Heyerdahl – ethnographer, adventurer
- Kåre Willoch – former prime minister of Norway
- Ingeborg Hoff – Norwegian linguist, who later was Senior Archivist at the Norwegian Dialect Archive
- Ernst S. Selmer - mathematician and cryptologist
- Atle Selberg - mathematician and Fields Medal winner
- Bård Guldvik Eithun - Norwegian Black Metal Musician
- Imrana Alhaji Buba - Nigerian Political Scientist and social entrepreneur

== Seal ==
An older version of the university seal

The seal of the University of Oslo features Apollo with the Lyre, and dates from 1835. The seal has been redesigned several times, most recently in 2009.

== Fees ==
Like all public institutions of higher education in Norway, the university does not charge tuition fees. However, a small fee of 600 kr (roughly US$70) per term goes to the student welfare organisation Foundation for Student Life in Oslo, to subsidise kindergartens, health services, housing and cultural initiatives, the weekly newspaper Universitas and the radio station Radio Nova.

In addition the students are charged a copy and paper fee of 200 kr (roughly US$25) for full-time students and 100 kr (roughly US$12) for part-time students. Lastly a voluntary sum of 40 kr (roughly US$5) is donated to SAIH (Studentenes og Akademikernes Internasjonale Hjelpefond).

== Rankings ==
University rankings

Global – Overall
- ARWU World: 72 (2024)
- QS World: =119 (2026)
- THE World: =116 (2025)

In 2023, Shanghai Jiao Tong University's Academic Ranking of World Universities ranked UiO 73rd worldwide and the best in Norway, while the 2024 Times Higher Education World University Rankings ranked UiO 127th and the 2024 rankings of the QS World University Rankings ranked UiO 117th worldwide. The 2022 Webometrics Ranking of World Universities ranked UiO 94th worldwide.

The 2022 rankings of the Center for World University Rankings (CWUR), which "publishes the only global university ranking that measures the quality of education and training of students as well as the prestige of the faculty members and the quality of their research without relying on surveys and university data submissions", ranked UiO 99th worldwide.

== International cooperation ==
The University of Oslo administers the Henrik Steffens Professorship at the Humboldt University of Berlin jointly with the Humboldt University. The professorship was established and is funded by the Norwegian government.

The university participates to several of the experiments in the CERN research programme.

UiO is an active member of the University of the Arctic. UArctic is an international cooperative network based in the Circumpolar Arctic region, consisting of more than 200 universities, colleges, and other organizations with an interest in promoting education and research in the Arctic region.

== See also ==
- Higher education in Norway
- List of modern universities in Europe (1801–1945)
