= Yngvar Løchen =

Norwegian sociologist

Yngvar Løchen (31 May 1931 – 28 July 1998) was a Norwegian sociologist.

He took his dr.philos. in 1965 and was hired as associate professor of community medicine at the University of Oslo the same year. In 1971 he was appointed professor in the sociology of medicine at the University of Tromsø. He served as chancellor from 1977 to 1981.

He was also chairman of the Hovedkomiteen for norsk forskning from 1974 to 1977, and of the Rådet for samfunnsvitenskapelig forskning from 1985 to 1989.

Løchen's 1965 work Idealer og realiteter i et psykiatrisk sykehus (Ideals and Realities in a Psychiatric Hospital) was selected for the Norwegian Sociology Canon in 2009–2011.

== Selected bibliography ==
This is a list of his most notable works:

- Idealer og realiteter i et psykiatrisk sykehus (1965)
- Sosiologens dilemma (1970)
- Behandlingssamfunnet (1971)
- Stol på egne krefter (1977)
- Liv og forvitring i vårt samfunn (1985)
- Forpliktende fantasi (1993)
- Det gjenstridige livet (1998)

Academic offices
Preceded by Olav Holt	Chancellor of the University of Tromsø; 1977–1981	Succeeded by Helge Stalsberg
