= Øystein Gullvåg Holter =

Norwegian sociologist

Øystein Gullvåg Holter (born 7 February 1952) is a Norwegian sociologist and expert on men's studies. Son of Harriet Holter. He is Professor of men's studies at the University of Oslo, the first to be appointed to such a chair in Norway. He worked as a researcher at the Work Research Institute from 1980 to 2006, and at the Nordic Gender Institute from 2006 to 2008. His fields of research are work and family, gender equality and historical sociology. He was a member of the Equality Commission, established by a Royal Decree of 12 February 2010 in order to report on Norway’s equality policies.

== Books ==
- Arbeid og familie - en studie av teknologkulturen, Universitetsforlaget, 1990
- Menns livssammenheng, Ad Notam Gyldendal, 1993
- Labour of Love - Beyond the Self-evidence of Everyday Life, co-editor with Tordis Borchgrevink, Ashgate/Avebury, 1995
- Gender, Patriarchy and Capitalism - A Social Forms Analysis, University of Oslo/Work Research Institute, 1997
- Can Men Do It? Men and Gender Equality - The Nordic Experience, TemaNord 2003:510, Copenhagen, 2003
