= Vestkanten =

Vestkanten may refer to:

- Vestkanten was a free newspaper in Oslo (now called Lokalavisen Frogner)
- Vestkanten is a shopping centre in Bergen
- The Western part of Oslo
