= Cato Wadel =

Norwegian social anthropologist

Cato Wadel (29 March 1936 − 21 April 2011) was a Norwegian social anthropologist.

He was born in Oslo, but grew up in Flekkefjord. He graduated from the University of Bergen in 1966 and was hired as assistant professor at the Memorial University of Newfoundland in 1967. He returned to Norway as associate professor at the University of Oslo in 1970, then at the University of Tromsø from 1972. He was a professor in Tromsø from 1974 to 1983, then associate professor at Rogaland University College from 1986 and professor from 1993 to 2005. In addition he resumed his tenure at the University of Tromsø as adjunct professor from 1990.

Wadel studied peripheral communities in Norway and Newfoundland, often fisher's' communities. His 1977 article "Hva er arbeid" ("What is Labour") was included in the Norwegian Sociology Canon. He died 75 years old in Flekkefjord.
