= Helge Stalsberg =

Norwegian physician (born 1932)

Helge Stalsberg (born 7 October 1932) was a Norwegian physician.

He was born in Oslo. He was chief physician of the University Hospital of North Norway, and professor of morphology at the University of Tromsø from 1972. He served as rector from 1981 to 1985. He has also been a consultant for the World Health Organization.

Academic offices
Preceded by Yngvar Løchen	Rector of the University of Tromsø; 1981–1985	Succeeded by Narve Bjørgo
