= Harriet Holter =

Norwegian psychologist

- Born: 11 April 1922
- Died: 18 December 1997 (aged 75)
- Citizenship: Norwegian
- Scientific career
- Fields: Women's studies
- Institutions: Institute for Social Research; University of Oslo

Harriet Holter (11 April 1922 – 18 December 1997) was a Norwegian social psychologist.

== Career ==
She graduated with the cand.oecon. degree in 1946, and was eventually hired as a research fellow at the Norwegian Institute for Social Research, which was established in 1950.

Despite having a degree in economics, the prospect of making an academic career in this field became unsettling for Holter. In her early career, she researched the working life. After analyses of the role of women in the workforce, she began concentrating more on women's studies in general. As she took the dr.philos. degree in 1970 on the thesis Sex Roles and Social Structure (which was also selected for the Norwegian Sociology Canon in 2009–2011), Holter became a pioneer in this field in the Nordic countries.

She was appointed professor at the University of Oslo in 1973. She continued researching gender roles, publishing Kvinners liv og arbeid: kjønnsroller og sosial struktur in 1974. She later edited the books Familien i klassesamfunnet (1976), Kvinner i fellesskap (1982) and Patriarchy in a Welfare Society (1984). Her own works Tvang til seksualitet (1986) and Sex i arbeid(et) i Norge (1992) pertained to the field of gender and sexuality studies, and the former became controversial. She retired as a professor in 1992, but continued working as a senior researcher. Among her last publications were the 1996 Hun og han. Kjønn i forskning og politikk, a textbook on gender and politics for which she was co-editor.

== Death and legacy ==
Holter died in December 1997, following long-term illness. A house at the University of Oslo campus, Blindern, has been named after her.

In 2008 her son Øystein Gullvåg Holter became Norway's first professor of men's studies, having been appointed at the University of Oslo.
