= Stein Bråten =

Stein Leif Bråten (3 November 1934 – 27 March 2024) was a Norwegian sociologist and social psychologist specializing in communication.

He used the Simula programming language in one of the earliest uses of computers in modelling interpersonal communication (cfr his "A Simulation Study of Personal and Mass Communication", IAG Quarterly Journal of the Administrative Data Processing Group of IFIP, 1968, vol.1, no.2:.7-28). In 1989 he was awarded a PhD. in psychology at the University of Bergen for work on preverbal communication with infants connected to his theory of the virtual other.

He was recognized for his work on mother-child interaction and in 1998 edited Intersubjective Communication and Emotion in Early Ontogeny, published by Cambridge University Press (ISBN 0-521-62257-3).

He was professor emeritus at the University of Oslo and was member of the Norwegian Academy of Science. His 1973 article "Model Monopoly and Communication: Systems Theoretical Notes on Democratization" was selected for the Norwegian Sociology Canon by Sosiologinytt in 2011 (issued by the Norwegian Sociological Organization). A main theme in this article is that the so-called 'model strength' of the participants in a conversation (in such as a boardroom) affects the outcome of prolonged conversation as regards influence and power (put simply, this is in contrast to the view that communication in general leads to democratic spread of power).
