= Narve Bjørgo =

Norwegian historian (1936–2025)

Narve Bjørgo (3 May 1936 – 9 March 2025) was a Norwegian historian.

== Life and career ==
Bjørgo was born in Meland Municipality on 3 May 1936. He graduated from the University of Bergen in 1964 and worked as a research assistant until 1970. Then, for two years, he was a research fellow and associate professor. In 1973, he was appointed professor of history at the University of Tromsø. He served as dean from 1984 to 1985, and rector from 1985 to 1989. He was CEO of NAVF from 1991 to 1993, and professor at the University of Bergen from 1993 to 2006, before retiring. In 2008, he was given an honorary degree at the University of Tromsø.

Bjørgo was a member of the board of NUPI from 1974 to 1978, of the Nansen Foundation from 1974 to 1980. He chaired the board of the Norwegian National Academy of Ballet from 1994 to 1995, the Norwegian National Academy of Opera from 1994 to 1996, the Ivar Aasen Centre from 1998 to 2002 and the Norwegian Agency of Quality Assurance in Education from 2002 to 2005.

Bjørgo settled at Frekhaug. He died on 9 March 2025, at the age of 88.

Academic offices
Preceded by Helge Stalsberg	Rector of the University of Tromsø; 1985–1989	Succeeded by Ole Danbolt Mjøs
