= Hans Skjervheim =

Norwegian philosopher

Hans Skjervheim (9 October 1926 – 22 February 1999) was a Norwegian philosopher. He was born in Voss Municipality.

He was a research fellow at the University of Oslo from 1963, professor at the Roskilde University from 1968, lector at the University of Bergen from 1969, and professor there from 1982. His work Deltakar og tilskodar og andre essays (Participant and Onlooker, and Other Essays, 1976) was selected for the Norwegian Sociology Canon in 2009–2011.

== Selected bibliography ==
This is a list of Skjervheim's most notable works:

- Objectivism and the Study of Man (1959)
- Vitskapen om mennesket og den filosofiske refleksjonen (1964)
- Det liberale dilemma (1968)
- Ideologianalyse, dialektikk, sosiologi (1973)
- Deltakar og tilskodar og andre essays (1976)
- Filosofi og dømmekraft (1992)
- Teknikk, politikk og utopi (1996)
- Selected Essay (1996)
- Mennesket selected essays, eds. Jon Hellesnes and Gunnar Skirbekk (2002)
