= Olav Holt =

Norwegian physicist

Olav Holt (7 January 1935 – 7 February 2021) was a Norwegian physicist.

Holt was born in Hedrum Municipality, and took his dr.philos. degree in 1963. Holt is a specialist in the upper atmosphere physics and radio wave propagation in the ionosphere.

Later, Holt was hired as professor at the University of Tromsø in 1969, where he served as rector from 1973 to 1977. He is a fellow of the Norwegian Academy of Technological Sciences. In 2003 he was proclaimed Knight, First Class of the Royal Norwegian Order of St. Olav.

His wife is Tordis Holt and he is the father of the Norwegian bestselling author and former Minister of Justice Anne Holt, and the Cardiologist Dr.med. Even Holt.

Academic offices
Preceded by Peter F. Hjort	Rector of the University of Tromsø; 1973–1977	Succeeded by Yngvar Løchen
