= Marianne Elisabeth Johnsen =

Norwegian businessperson

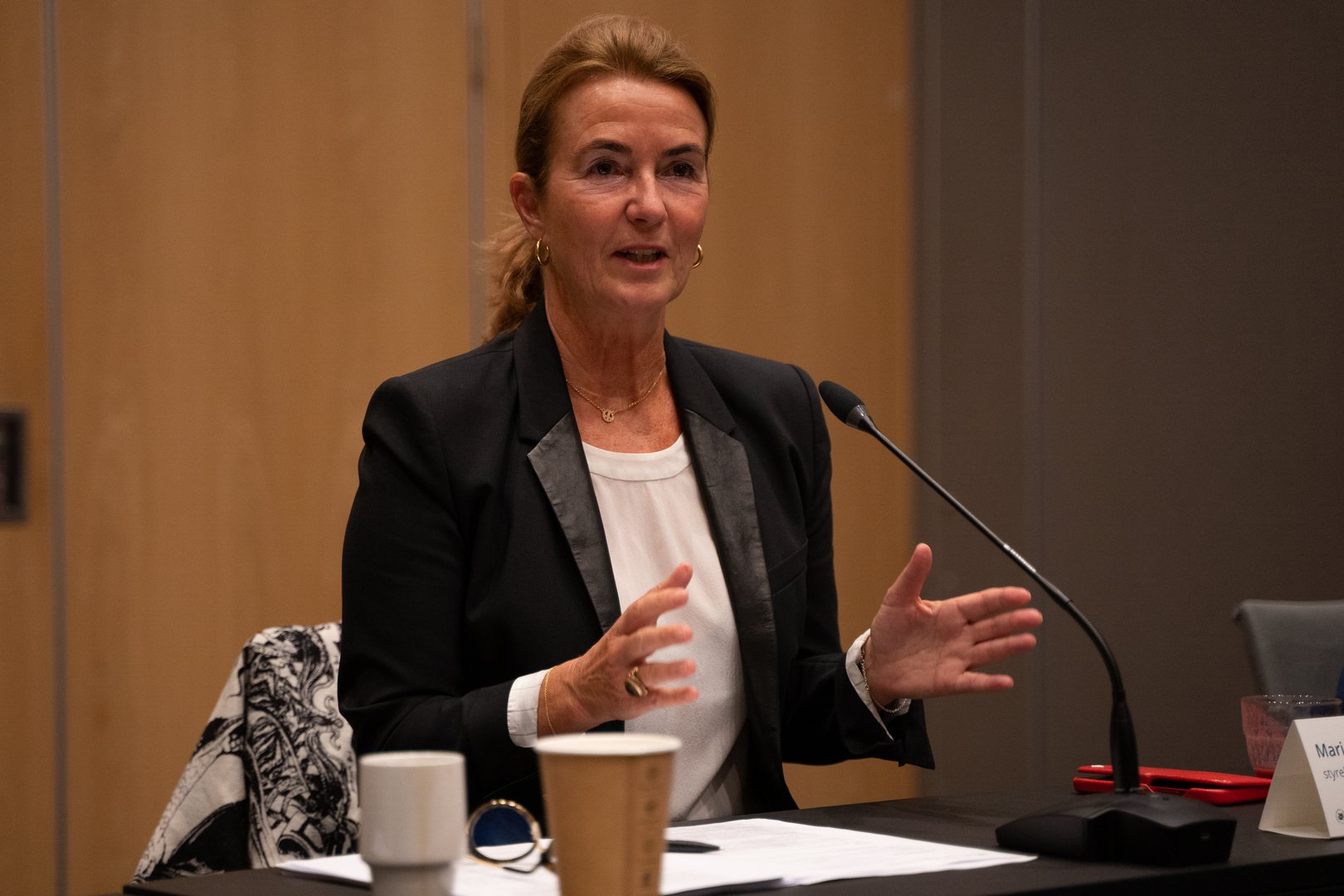

Marianne Elisabeth Johnsen (born 14 February 1963) is a Norwegian jurist and businessperson.

== Early life and education ==
She grew up in Asker as the oldest daughter of Statoil director Arve Johnsen, with two younger sisters.

Following her secondary education, she enrolled at the University of Oslo Faculty of Law. While studying law, she was a trainee in the law firm Hjort, in the office of the Norwegian Consumer Ombudsman and was a research assistant at the University of Oslo Institute of Women's Law. In addition, she worked as an assistant nurse at Dikemark Psychiatric Hospital. She ultimately graduated with the cand.jur. degree in 1990.

== Early career ==
Her career post-graduation was spent in the development aid agency Norad, before being hired at the Ullevål University Hospital. From being legal adviser to chief executive Ola H. Metliaas, she went on to create the hospital's legal department. Being married with two children, the family relocated to Brussels when Johnsen's husband was offered a job there. She enrolled at the Solvay Brussels School of Economics and Management, eventually graduating with an MBA.

Following graduation from Solvay, she was the runner-up candidate to become Norwegian Gender Equality Ombud in 2000, but was instead hired as vice president of Elkem Shared Services in the corporation Elkem. In 2003 she left Elkem to found the consulting and investment company Cascata, while also serving on several boards of directors. In the mid-2010s she passed the bar exam, becoming a lawyer.

== Board memberships ==
Johnsen was hand-picked by former Ullevål Hospital executive Ingar Pettersen as a board member of Aker University Hospital. She later served on the board of Sykehuspartner as well as companies such as Merkantildata and Petroleum Geo-Services. Johnsen has also chaired several electoral committees in Norwegian business, including Norwegian Property, Grieg Seafood and Odin Fund Management.

Building on her experience from Norad, she chaired the board of the Norwegian Refugee Council for six years. She also chaired International Research Institute of Stavanger and Litteraturhuset i Oslo. In 2016 she became chair of Kilden Performing Arts Centre. In 2021 she was named as chair of the University of Tromsø.

Within the fisheries sector she was a board member of Fjord Seafood, Copeinca, Pharmaq (also co-owner) and Morpol, before being named chair of the Norwegian Seafood Council in 2015. She later became a board member of Norway Royal Salmon. Upon selling her shares in Pharmaq, the valued had grown times 60. On the other hand, a venture into cod-farming aquaculture through the company Codfarmers, ended in a monetary loss.

== Personal life ==
Divorcing her first husband, she married again, and took up residence at Jar in Bærum. They also bought a farm in Tuscany.
