= East End and West End of Oslo =

Names for the two parts of Oslo

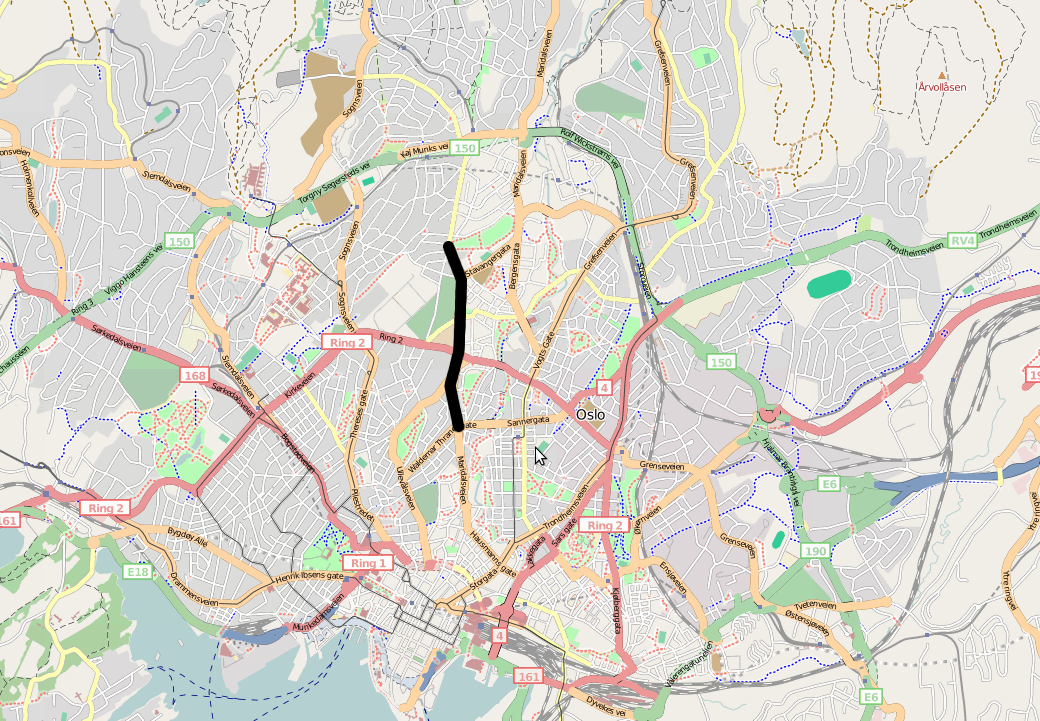
A map of central Oslo. Uelands gate, the traditional boundary line between the East End and the West End, is marked in black.

The East End and West End (Bokmål: østkanten og vestkanten, Nynorsk: austkanten og vestkanten) are used as names for the two parts of Oslo, Norway, formed by the economic and socially segregating separation line that has historically passed along the street Uelands gate. The Akerselva river is often seen as a boundary between west and east, but that can be misleading, as there are working-class neighbourhoods on both sides of the river.

The West End was built in the 1840s, and had since the 17th century been a common land area, with the area behind the castle as an exit point. The East End grew around the new industry and along the passageways to the east. Around 1890, the division between east and west was prominent and most districts of the city were marked by class, either by working-class or bourgeois class. This division was reflected in architecture, but also in politics in that the Conservative Party and the Labour Party were, taken together, much more dominant than in other parts of Norway. The dialects have traditionally been quite different, and there has been a sharp distinction line between the sociolects of the two parts of the city, but this has somewhat diminished in the latest decades. Youths who have grown up in one part of the city usually have little experience of the other.

The West End districts (boroughs), districts number 4, 5, 6, 7 and 8, have a total population of about 202,000 as of 1 January 2011, while the East End districts have a total population of about 405,000 (January 2011).

In the East End, wealth, incomes and real estate prices are significantly lower than in the West End. Both the worst and the best living conditions in Norway can be found in Oslo. The economic difference is strengthened by the cultural capital of those who belong to the elite: social networks, education and activities that provide access to attractive jobs and other benefits. The distinction between east and west also concerns life expectancy, use of disability pension and self-experienced health conditions.

Since the 1970s, the great immigration to Oslo has influenced the city, concerning the distinction between east and west. Immigrants from Western Europe and North America are equally divided among the city's two parts, whereas most immigrants from Asia, Africa and Eastern Europe live in the East End. The worst living conditions can be found among immigrants from continents other than Europe.

Even though the districts in the East End of Oslo are among the worst in the city, they have relatively good living conditions and quality of education compared to the worst parts of most other major cities in Europe. Class distinctions play a smaller role for the majority of the population than in many other countries, and the good economic quality and living conditions of the Norwegian society are also reflected in the capital. What makes Oslo special is the lingering geographic class division of the city into two parts that has existed for almost 150 years.

== Boundaries and exceptions ==
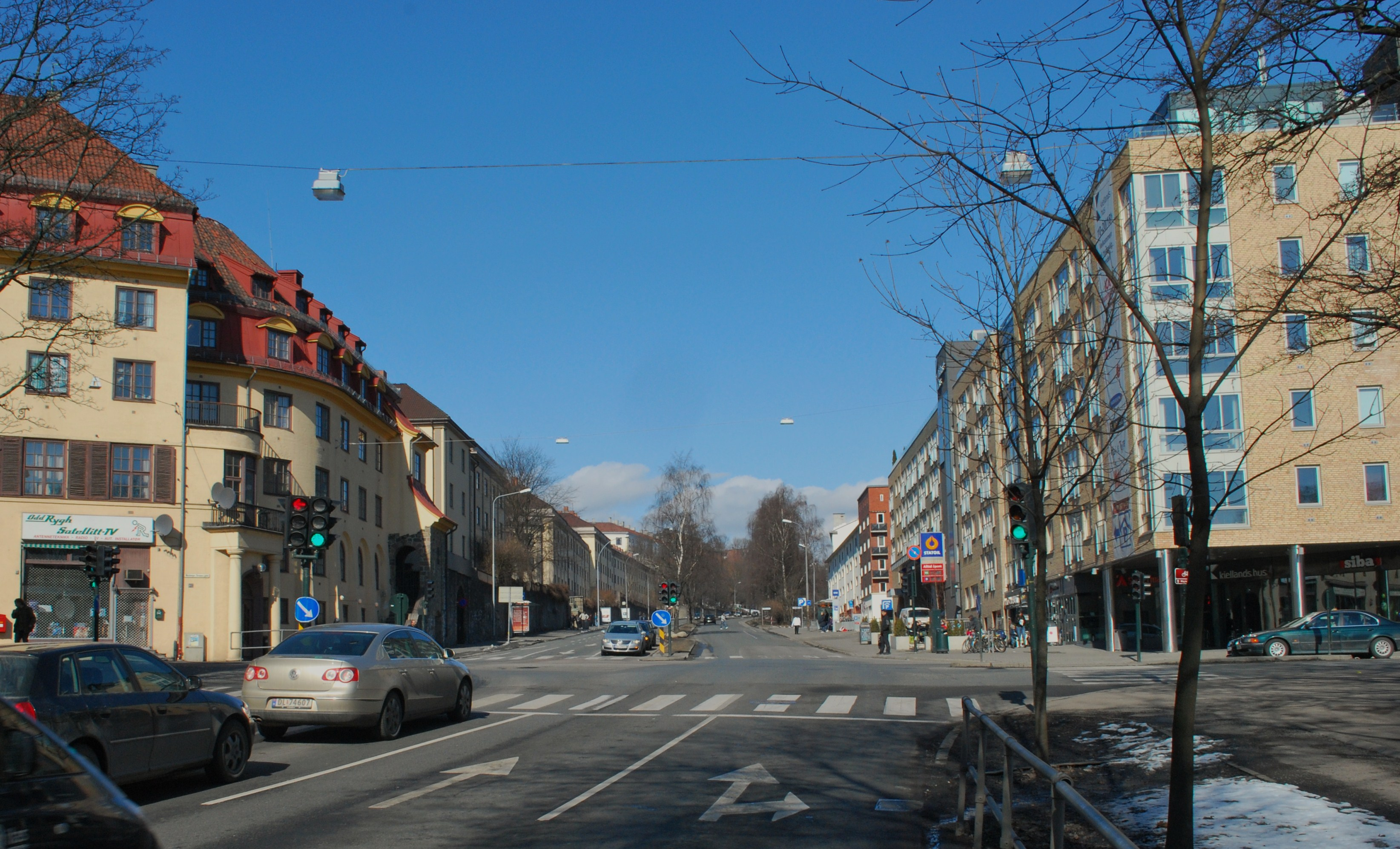
Uelands gate, seen from the south from Alexander Kiellands plass - about 300 metres west of the Akerselva river.

Researchers of languages and history see Uelands gate as the boundary between the East End and the West End. The boundary is not sharp, and differences between Iladalen immediately east of Uelands gate and the area around Bjerregaards gate are not marked by either architecture nor economy. Nearer to the city centre, the boundary goes along Akerryggen to the east of Vår Frelsers gravlund and approximately along Hammersborghøyden. The boundary is more vague in the city centre; the area between Møllergata and Pilestredet has no clear east-west distinction.

To the north of Uelands gate, the boundary goes along Voldsløkka and Maridalsveien. Further north, the villa areas of Kjelsås, Grefsen and Korsvoll in the district of Nordre Aker have had mixed population - today, the prices of apartments are high, while the participation in elections is less representative of the West End than further west. This article counts the entire district of Nordre Aker as belonging to the West End.

It is traditional to say "øst og vest for elva" ("east and west of the river" in Norwegian) to mean the economic difference. However, both sides of the Akerselva river are seen as belonging to the East End - Sagene, Bjølsen and the Hausmann area, located west of the river, are typical East End districts.

Of the districts in the inner city, Frogner and St. Hanshaugen are located in the West End, called inner west, while Sagene, Grünerløkka and Gamle Oslo are located in the East End and belong to the inner east. Ullern, Vestre Aker and Nordre Aker belong to the outer west area. The outer east area includes the districts of Alna, Bjerke, Grorud and Stovner in Groruddalen, and Østensjø and Søndre Nordstrand further south.

Nordstrand is an exception from the east-west distinction. The district includes the villa areas of Bekkelaget, Nordstrand, Ljan and others south of Ekebergskråningen. It has the best sun conditions and the best views in the city, and it is the furthest away from the industrial area. This is a well-off district, often called "beste østkant" ("the best of the East End"), where the population has the same economic and social features as further west. The formerly working-class areas in the West End, such as Pipervika, Skøyen, Hoffsbyen and Lilleaker, are no longer working-class areas.

== Geographical and economic differences before 1840 ==
In pre-industrial times, the rich and the poor lived in the same houses, with a wider distribution than what became common after the latter half of the 19th century. In Christiania, the elite lived in Kvadraturen inside the city walls, which were at that time called Kvartalerne (the Blocks). This area was the focus of well-off business owners in the East End near Bjørvika, whereas many workers lived in the north-western part along the streets Akersgata, Nedre Vollgate and Øvre Vollgate.

The mandatory use of masonry or timber frame with brick infill construction (murtvang) was enforced in the area from 1624, and in the early 18th century this use spread out about 200 metres outside the city walls. It was many times more expensive to build houses of masonry than of wood. The mandatory use of masonry, intended to prevent fire hazards, was found difficult to enforce already from 1624, and occasional disputes about it arose as the city grew.

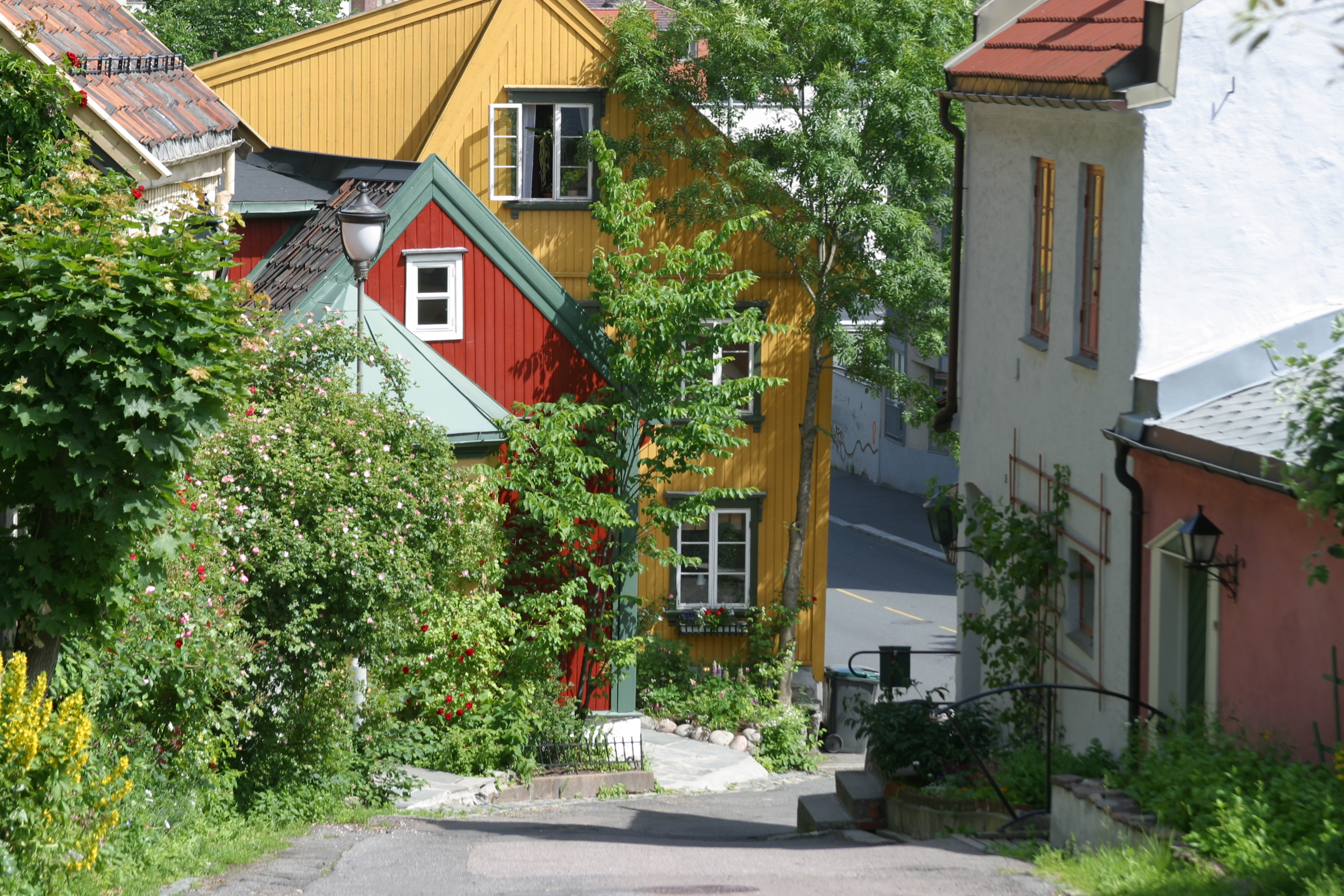
Damstredet.

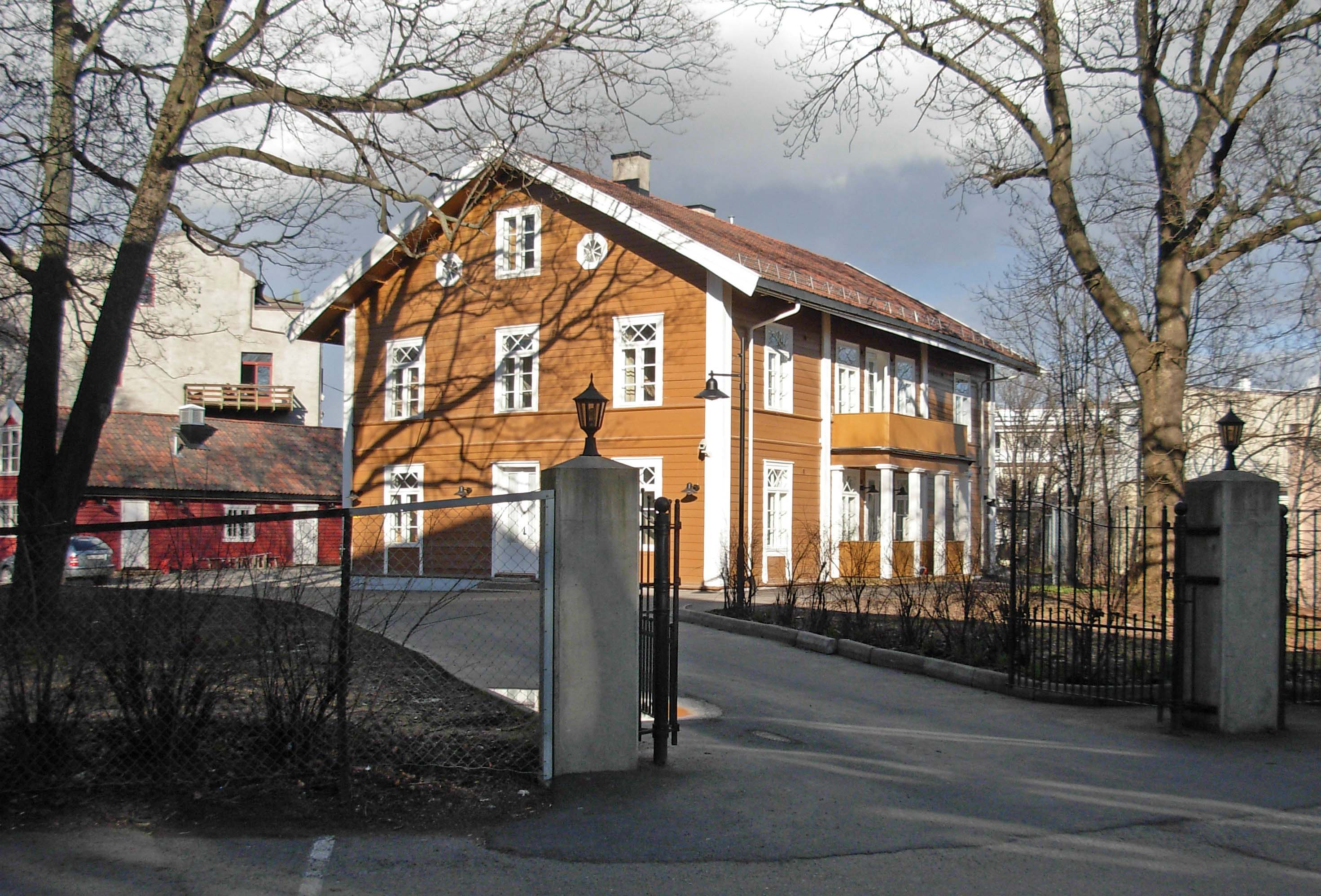
Lassonløkken, also called Soenerløkken. Grønnegata 19, Homansbyen. The main building was built by Thomas Heftye in the middle 1830s.

In 1766, about 50% of all apartment buildings in Kvadraturen were timber-framed, 30% of logs and 20% of masonry. The mandatory use of masonry was one of the reasons that the city became popular among business owners and officials, while low-income inhabitants lived in wooden houses outside the city. The 200-metre boundary caused suburbs to be built outside the city. The decision to spread out the mandatory use of masonry, in 1837, 1844, 1855 and 1858, did not proceed in equal steps with the growth of the city, and wooden suburbs soon rose outside what happened to be the boundary of the mandatory use of masonry at each point of time.

The wooden suburbs from the 17th century are gone: Pipervika, Vaterland, Sagene, Grønland, "Oslo" (Gamlebyen). Some of the newer ones are protected and are today seen as attractive places to live: Telthusbakken from the late 18th century and the short street Damstredet from the early 19th century. Of the wooden suburbs that grew precisely outside the city limits in the years before the city expansions in 1859 and 1878, Rodeløkka, Kampen and Vålerenga remain, at "Ny York" on Grünerløkka a few houses remain, while Ruseløkkbakken and Enerhaugen are gone.

In some of the suburbs, Storgaten, Grensen, Grønland and Gamle Oslo, lived also officials and well-off people. In Sagene, both factory owners and workers lived near the factories, as was common in early industrial times. Bryn is an example from the outer city. Around 1840, Vaterland was the area with the most diverse population.

In 1629, a large area to the west of Akerelva became city property. Citizens of Oslo had pastures in the area where they could farm animals. Resourceful citizens fenced off their pastures and built houses for people already in the 17th century - even though it wasn't allowed. This way, a market for country-side summer houses formed, and later they became full-year residences in what would become the West End.

== From the 1840s to 1900 ==
=== The Royal Palace becomes the new core of the West End - socially similar areas in both the east and the west ===
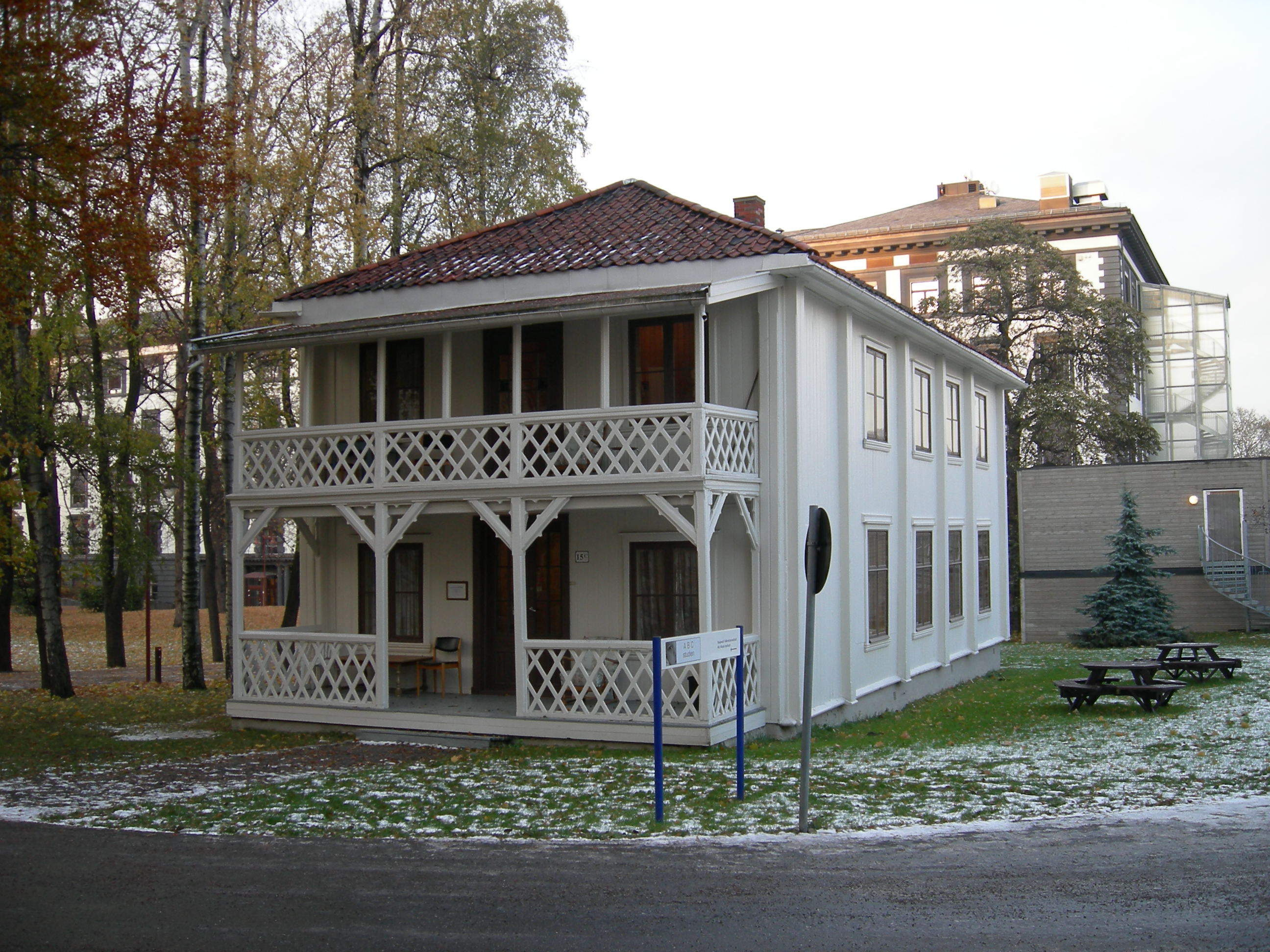
The løkke building at Lovisenberg, owned by F.H. Frølich.

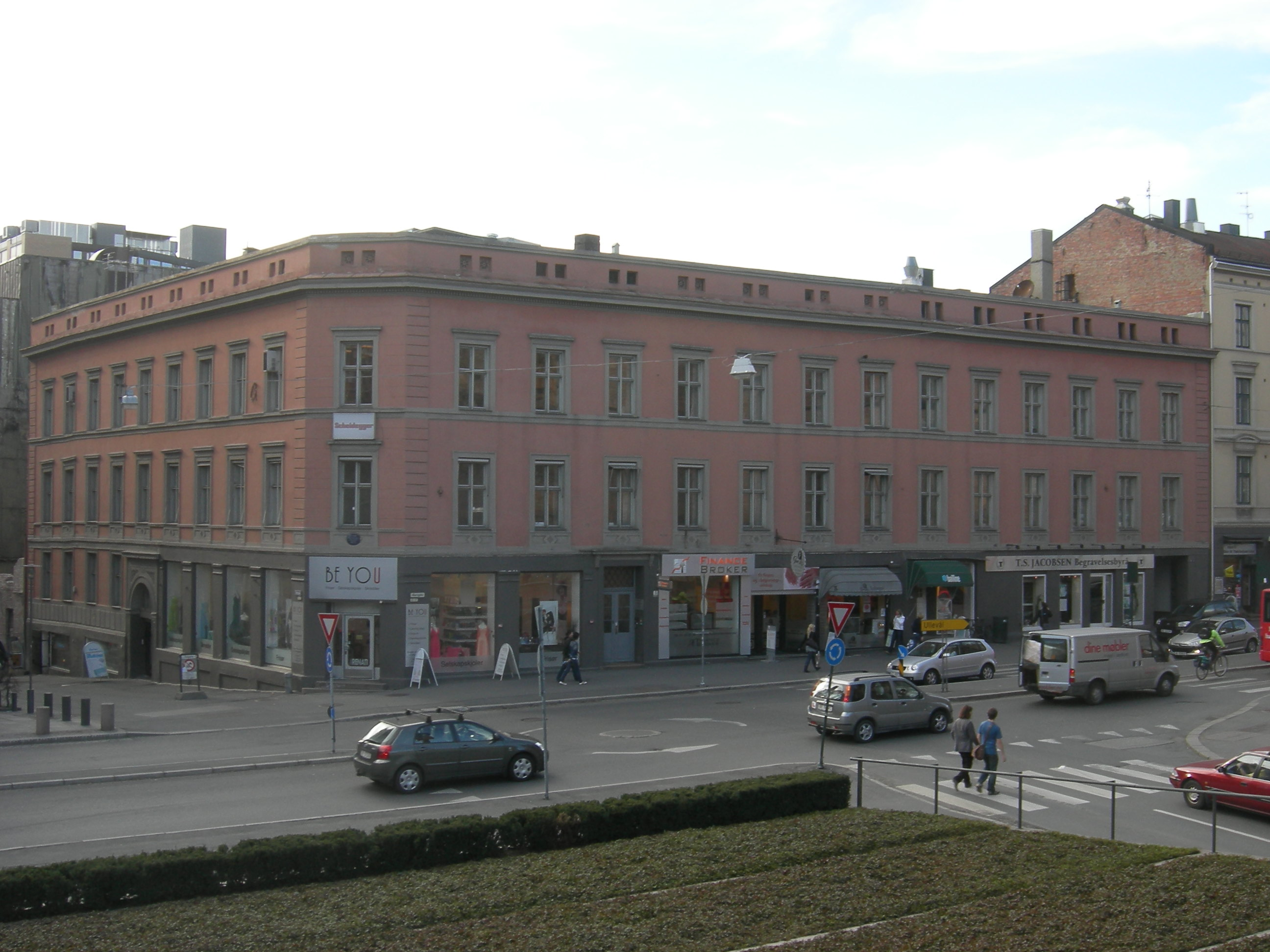
Maltheby, one of the first rented apartment buildings in the city, Akersgata 65, 1844.

The placement of the Royal Palace, on which construction started in 1824, was to be significant for the development of the East End and the West End. The castle architect Linstow drew a connection between the city and the palace in a city plan from 1838, so that there would be apartments for the well off along the connecting streets Karl Johans gate, Kristian IV:s gate and St. Olavs gate. In contrast, an area that became called Bak Slottet (Behind the Royal Palace), along Parkveien and Wergelandsveien, did become popular by the elite, having had city villas constructed in the 1840s to secure a pleasing neighbourhood for the new royal residence in Slottsparken. Homansbyen for the upper class bourgeois dates from the late 1850s. In the 1860s and especially in the 1870s, a ring of new, socially similar residence areas were built around the old town: Hegdehaugen, Uranienborg, along Drammensveien, Meyerløkka in the west, Fredensborg, Youngsløkka, the lower end of Grünerløkka and Nedre Tøyen in the east. Tenements with rented apartments were originally a form of living for the upper class - the first one in the city arrived in the 1840s and was located near Grev Wedels plass, along Karl Johans gate, and Maltheby in Akersgata 65, whereas the worker class lived in wooden houses in the suburbs.

In that time, wealthy people moved from what would become the East End to the new West End, professors from the university buildings in Tøyen, factory owners from Sagene, officials from Gamlebyen, people in the city gardens in Kvadraturen which became shop buildings etc. In the East End, the population became more homogenous than before: new immigrants from Eastern Norway and original citizens built the new worker class in the city of Kristiania together, affecting the growing industry, handwork, transport, and other areas.

Around 1880 the division between the East End and the West End was prominent but not complete. In this early stage, new apartments for wealthy people in areas such as Gamlebyen (Schweigaards gate) were built, and it was attractive to settle down in Kvadraturen. The expansion of the city in the 1890s strengthened the division and the systematic boundary line. In 1910, the average income in Sofienberg was a tenth of that in Frogner.

Open communications made it possible to live further away from one's working place than before. Horse-driven trams were opened in Homansbyen and Gamlebyen in 1875 and in Grüneløkka in 1878, and electric trams were taken into use in 1894 and had new lines constructed for them. This affected the development of the new areas with socially and economically homogeneous population.

=== Middle class areas ===
The areas to the north of the city centre belong to the West End, but they became very early, and still are, reflected by the middle class, having many officials, high education, and few rich people. These areas include Meyerløkka, Gamle Aker, St. Hanshaugen, parts of Ila, Bolteløkka, Valleløkken, Fagerborg, Lindern and Adamstuen. The villa suburbs of today's outer town grew up along the new railway, and had about 12,000 inhabitants in the early 20th century, in the west Lysaker, Skøyen, Bestum, in the east Bryn, which was the first in the city from the 1860s, Grorud, Bekkelaget, Nordstrand, Ljan - with mixed inhabitants, with no marked East End character.

=== Worker areas in the West End ===
Some worker areas can be found in the West End:

- Balkeby in Hegdehaugen was a philanthropic worker apartment project built in the 1860s, but lost this character after a large fire in 1879.
- Briskeby grew up from the 1840s, outside the new city border that followed along Briskebyveien. A couple of wooden houses from this suburb have survived the city renovation in the 1970s.
- Ruseløkkbakken, with the nickname "Røverstatene" or Algier, Tunis og Tripolis, was torn down in the 1880s to make room for the rented apartment complex Victoria terrasse and the bazaars in Ruseløkkveien.
- Pipervika remained until the 1930s, when the narrow streets with tightly built wooden houses had to make room for the Oslo City Hall and new shop buildings.
- Vestre Vika remained for longer, until the 1950s and 1960s, when this area was also replaced with office and shop buildings.
- Along Pilestredet were apartments for workers in industrial corporations built in the late 19th century up to Bislett.

=== "Murbyen" with rented apartments: architecture, parks ===
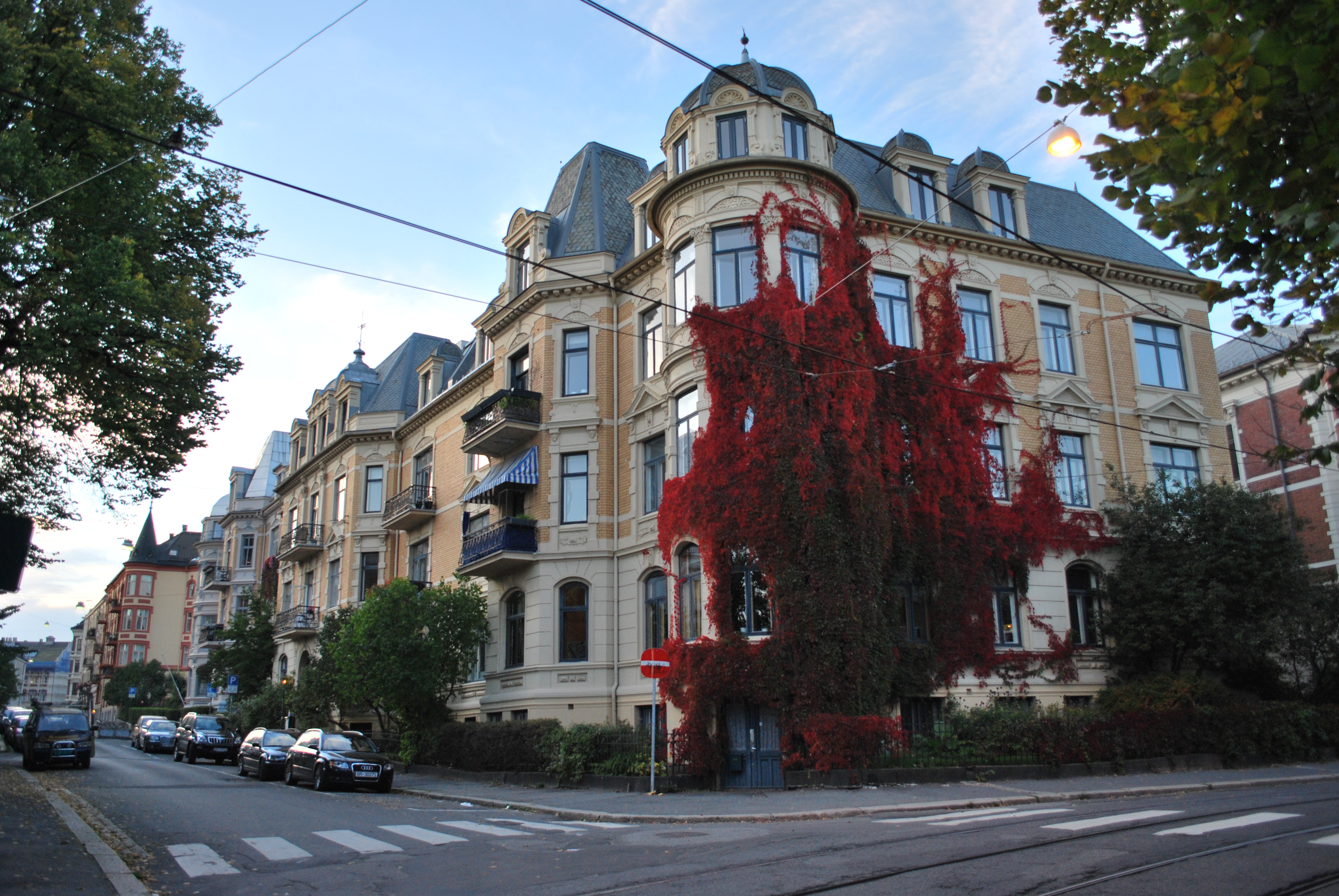
Rented apartment buildings in the West End (Meltzers gate, a neighbourhood Bak Slottet, built in 1899).

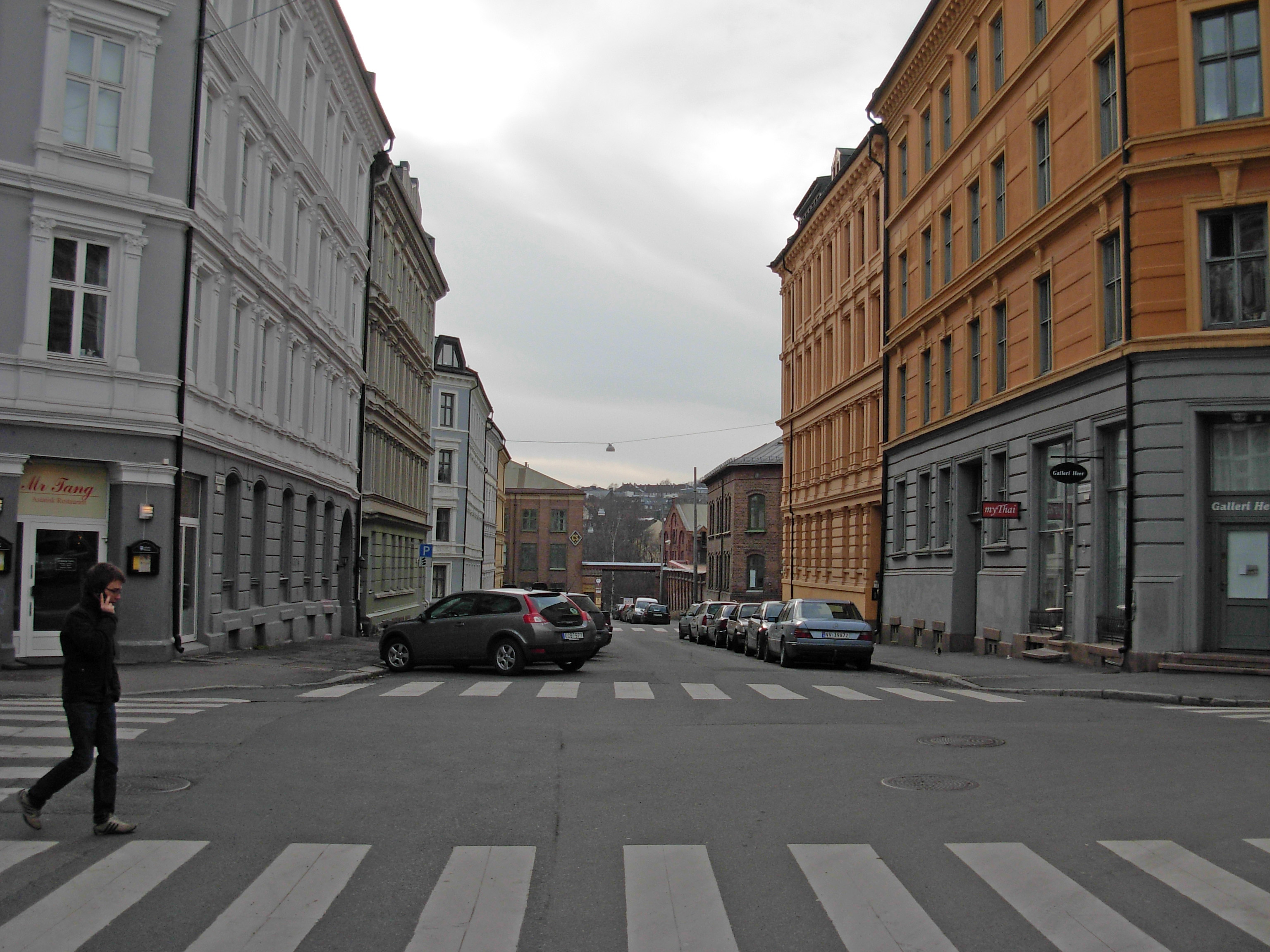
Rented apartment buildings and industry in the East End. Seilduksgata in Grünerløkka.

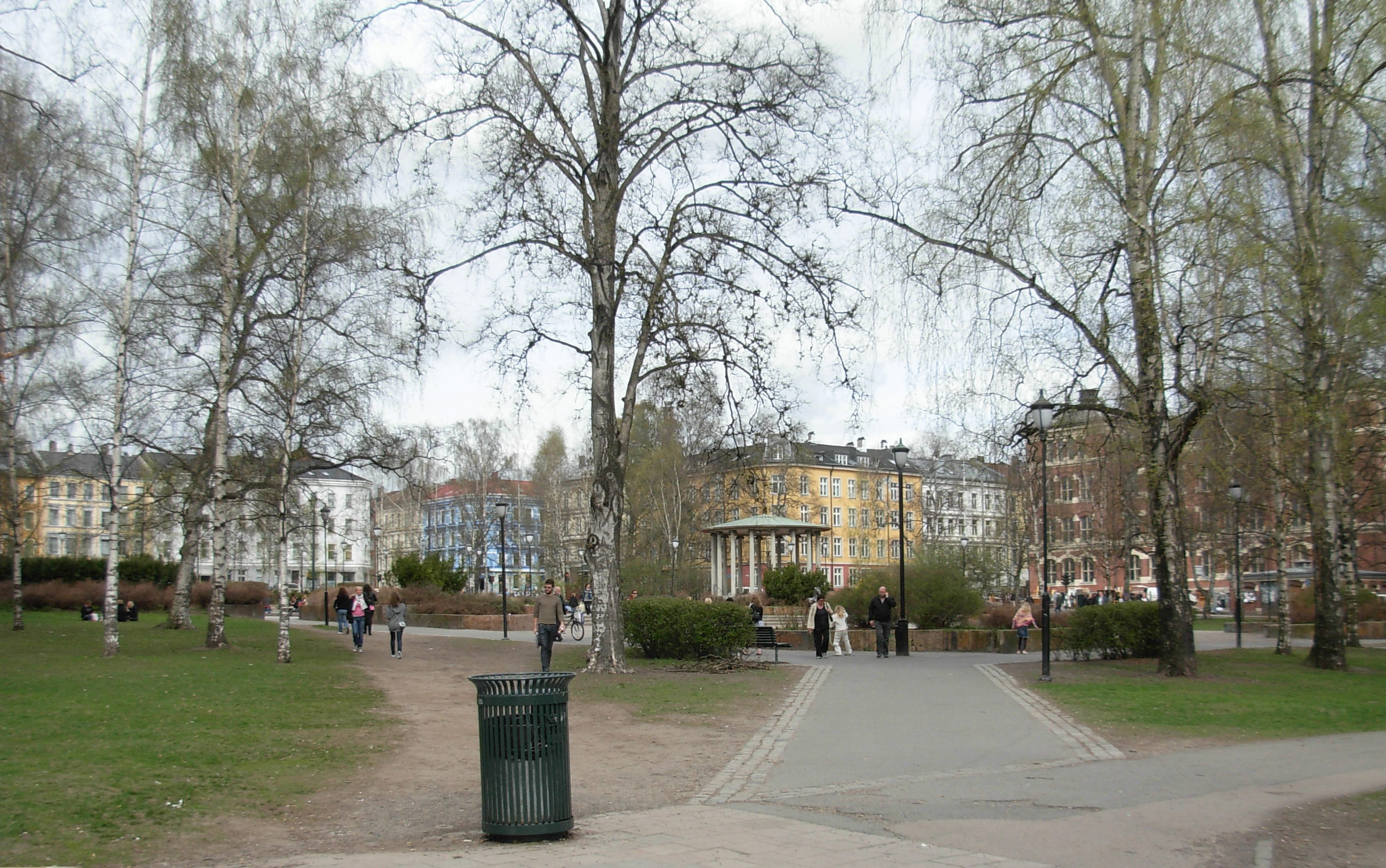
Birkelunden in Grünerløkka.

The buildings were first and foremost rented apartment buildings in these districts, built one block at a time under the supervision of a building contractor, and are today called "murbyen". The district structure was similar both in the East End and the West End, and the facades of the houses were made of stuccoed brickwork and the decorations were mostly similar. Gråbeingårdene in Tøyen without decorations and with visible tiles was a prominent exception and was criticised for poor-looking formation in order to house apartments - at that time, it was factory buildings, churches, fire stations and hospitals that had tile facades.

There were however some important differences:

- In the West End, apartments were large, with room for staff (maids), many courtrooms and separate bedrooms for adults and children - in the East End, apartments were much smaller, but because of economic reasons, entire families and others (relatives or tenants) lived in them.
- In the West End, there were few buildings in inner yards (but some buildings only accessible from inner yards) - in the East End, it was common for builders to build an inner row of buildings with even less light and air than buildings facing the street. The worst-off of the worker population lived in these buildings.
- In the West end, buildings had vertically prominent facades (risalit), balconies and intricate details in the walls - in the East End, the facades were more plain, with considerably few having balconies.
- In the West End, it was clear from the start of the building behind the castle and in Homansbyen that businesses - with the exception of grocery stores - were not allowed. The intention was to avoid dirt, noise and an outlook strongly reflecting the worker class. In the East End, the bottom floors and inner yard buildings were dominated by small businesses and there were factory areas, such as those along the Akerselva river and in Dælenenga.
- In the West End, there were many rented apartment buildings with gardens in front of them - this was rare in the East End.
- In the West End, there were city villas built of tiles or built in a Swiss style - in the East End, there were overpopulated wooden suburbs.

From around 1870, there was a communal drive to build parks in the city, and the city assembly (bystyret) willingly diverted resources to the East End, with the Kampen park being the finest and most used. In Grünerløkka, Olaf Ryes plass and Birkelunden became open squares in a well-kept area, and especially Birkelunden became an important place for political meetings in the following decades. Earlier in the same century, Selskabet for Oslo Byes Vel had built garden streets along Grønlandsleiret, Trondheimsveien and other streets, but these did not last.

=== Reasons for the division between the East End and the West End ===
There is no one special reason for the division of Oslo between the East End and the West End. The well-off bourgeois already belonged to the part of the city that became the West End. The workers lived in suburbs in the East End, along immigration ways from the areas in Eastern Norway where many of them came from, and near their working places, especially along both sides of the Akerselva river, but some also near the few industry businesses that were built in the West End, Pilestredet, Skøyen, Lilleaker among others.

The bourgeois expressed a stronger desire to live away from the workers in the 19th century than they had done earlier, and it was more important to live in "the right neighbourhood". Trams made this division possible. As the West End was first established with clean apartment districts with larger and more expensive apartments than the workers could afford, it was difficult to ignore this division. Also, few people wanted to live in a neighbourhood with people that had an entirely different economic and social class than them.

In many of Europe's largest cities, the wind most often blows from the west to the east. That this causes cleaner air in the western parts of the cities, because industry smoke blows towards the east, is sometimes cited as an explanation for the east-west division. This is speculation - which does not apply for Stockholm, but does for many other large cities in Europe - in the case of Oslo, the east-west distinction was already prominent before industry smoke became a factor in the city.

== The first half of the 20th century ==
=== Active municipal housing policy ===
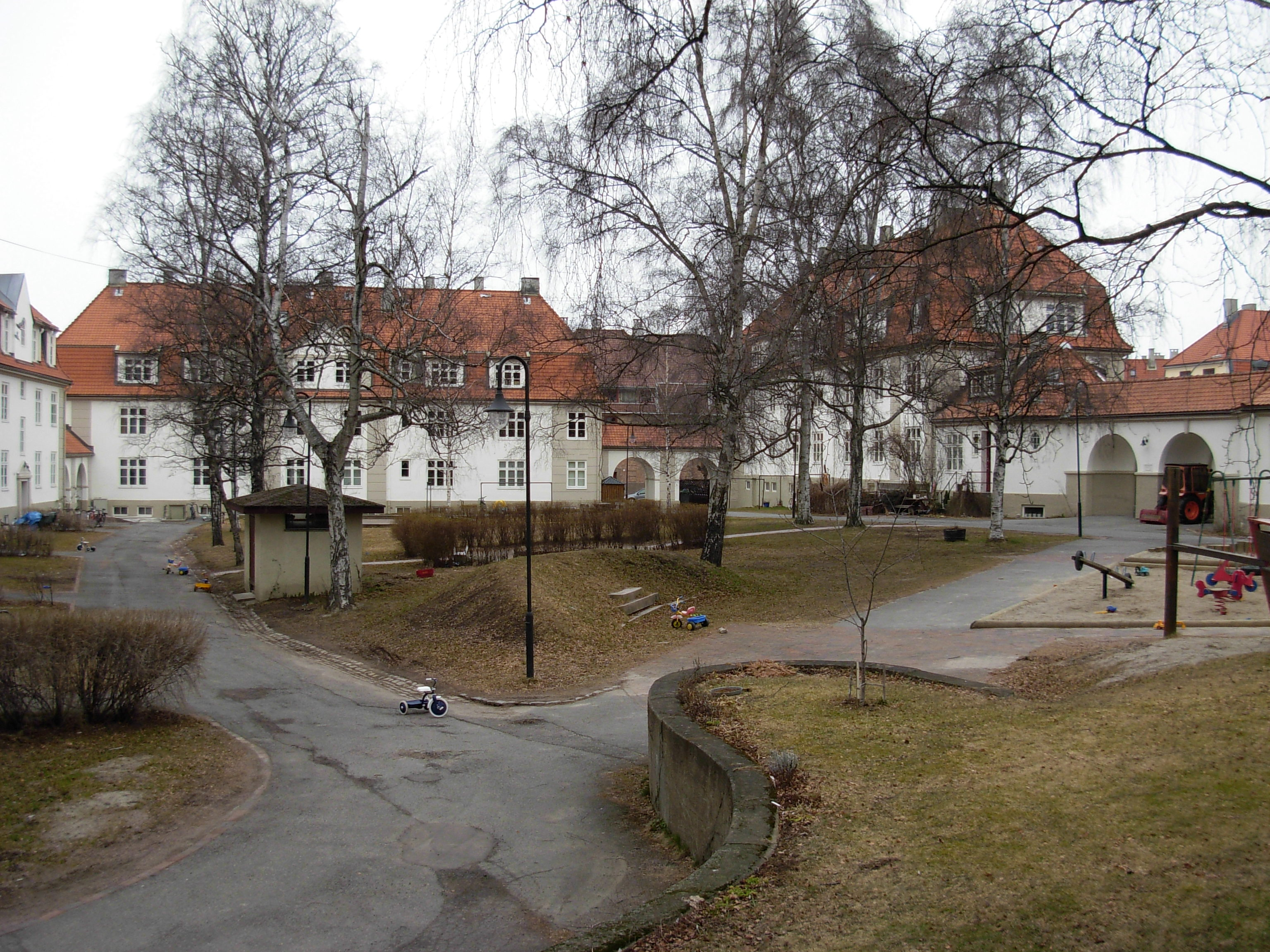
A house in Lindern hageby, built in 1919.

After the financial crash in 1899, construction of apartments was almost completely halted. From 1911, the municipality took responsibility of building apartments, and up to right after 1930, new apartment areas for the worker class were built. These were high-quality apartments, with a focus on good distribution of light, air and parks. But the east-west distinction still showed through; in Torshov, Nordre Åsen, Vøyenvolden, Rosenhoff, Markus Thranes gate 8-20 and Tøyengata 47, the working class lived in the apartments. Officials and other middle class moved into the apartments that were built in the West End: Ullevål hageby, Lindern, Jessenløkken. Ilaløkken, which is located near the boundary line along Uelands gate, received a mixed population of middle class and workers.

From 1935, the cooperative housing company OBOS was an entrepreneur for the municipally-driven building of apartments. In the outer city, both in the east and in the west, villa areas arose along the subway lines. Oslo was the dominant industrial city in Norway, with specially larger incomes among tax payers than in the average municipality, and managed starting from the First World War and the 1920 and 1930s to build up good municipal services. In regards of education, health care, economic support to those in danger of becoming poor, and many other areas, the capital was the leading city to offer services before other cities, give its own support in addition to that of the Norwegian state, and with well-regarded working environments that became exemplary outside the city borders. Health care benefits improved in the East End, but the east-west division still remained.

=== The Labour Party and the Conservative Party divide the city in two parts politically ===
Politically, Oslo has long been more divided than the rest of Norway. The Norwegian Labour Party became large very early, whereas people with normal incomes often voted for the Conservative Party if they worked in offices or in the public sector. In the 1906 election, the Conservative Party and the Labour Party had a total of 86% of the votes, compared to 49% in the entire country of Norway, and this two-party dominance continued strong for most of the 20th century. The mayors of Oslo from 1900 to 2009 have been from these two parties, with the exception of short interim periods.

The Conservative Party has been dominant in the West End and the Labour Party in the East End. In 1915, when the city elected five representatives from one-man election districts, the Labour Party received 11.8% of the votes in Uranienborg and 69.4% in Grünerløkka, whereas the Conservative Party received 81.1% of the votes in Uranienborg and 23.1% in Grünerløkka. In 1961, the left-wing parties received vote counts from 64% (Gamlebyen) to 83% (Lilleborg) in the East End districts, and from 17% (Vigelandsmuseet) to 45% (Katedralskolen) in the West End districts.

== The second half of the 20th century ==
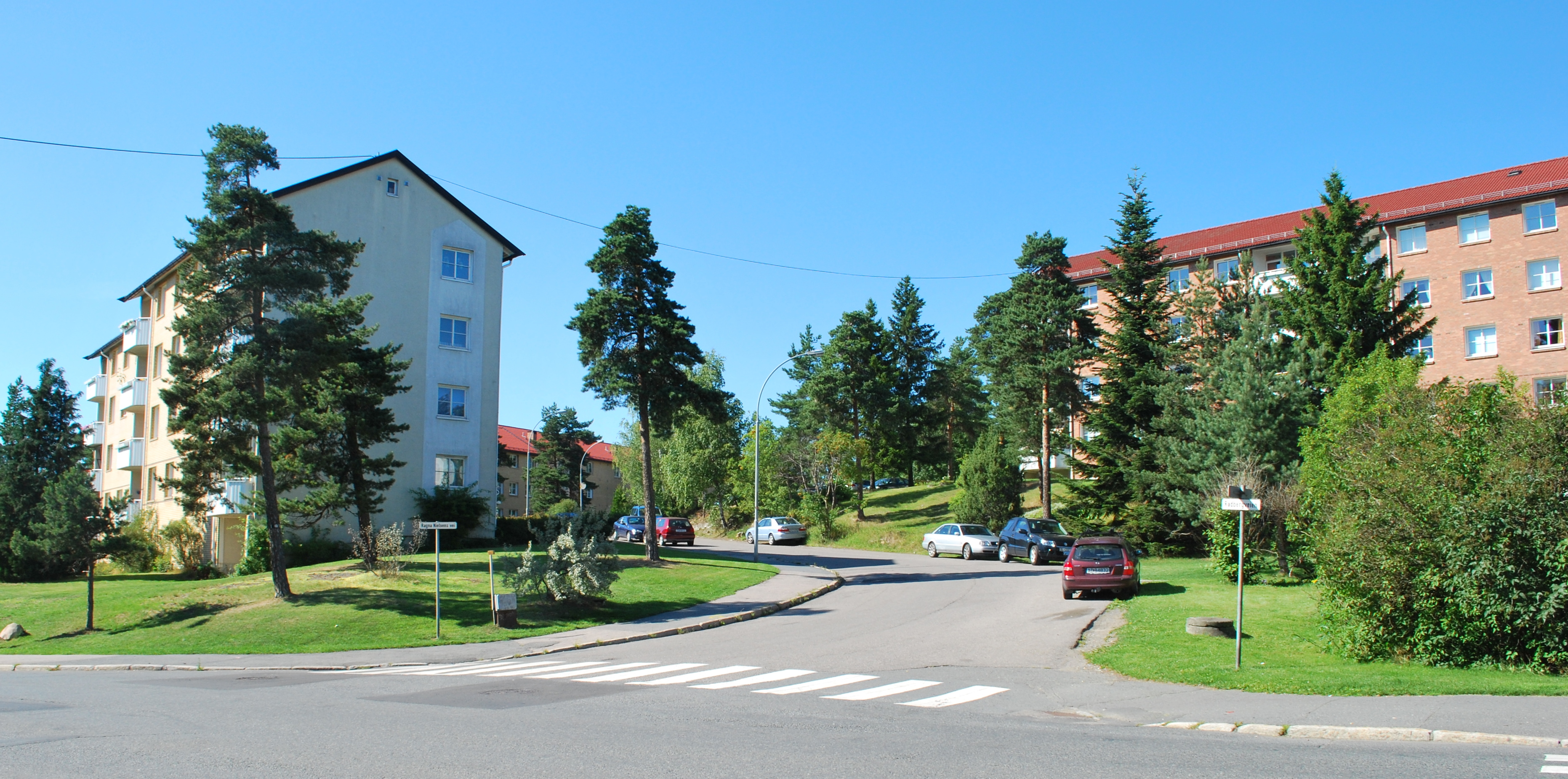
Tonsenhagen, built in the late 1950s.

After the Second World War, the municipality bought large areas in Aker municipality, which was combined into Oslo in 1948, and began building large numbers of apartments in what is now called the outer east. The new satellite towns became inhabited by worker and official families, who saw this as a drastic improvement on the quality of living. The rise in living standards, better education and moving from factory to service jobs caused a less sharp class distinction between the east and the west than before the second World War. From about 1960, incomes became more equal between workers and officials.

However, the city lost standing compared to the rest of Norway: in 1950, the average income for individual taxpayers was 155% of the average in the entire country, in 1980 this was 113%. From the 1970s, the population diminished and the municipality's economic status sank. Oslo was no longer the leading city in terms of schools and health care, parks became less used and people felt insecure because of substance abusers, the number of social support recipients rose sixfold from 1964 to 1989 (30,000), and the number of reported crimes rose two and a half times between 1970 and 1986.

Resourceful families moved out of the old East End, the number of children diminished drastically, and the number of inhabitants that were dependent on public support (economic and social support) rose significantly here. The apartments had the worst standard in the entire country, with a large number without a toilet in the apartment. This feeling of poverty and a step backwards was founded by real conditions, and intensified the differences between the inner east and the well-off West End. As late as the 1980s, rented apartments in the East End could shock members of the Parliament of Norway, who were shown apartments that had to be renovated. They were not aware that such living conditions existed in Norway.

It was here that the first immigrants from Asia, in the early 1970s, could find apartments they could afford. They took poor-paying and insecure jobs, often with uncomfortable working times, as had been historically common for new immigrants in the areas they lived in. In the late 1970s, two thirds of them lived in the inner city. In the 1980s they had changed, the number of people living in the inner city was now 38%. There the young men who arrived first had large families, and immigrants began a move that resembled those of Norwegian immigrants - out to better and larger apartments in the outer east, especially to Groruddalen and Søndre Nordstrand. Non-Western immigrants comprised 5% of the city's population in 1987 and 14% in 2000.

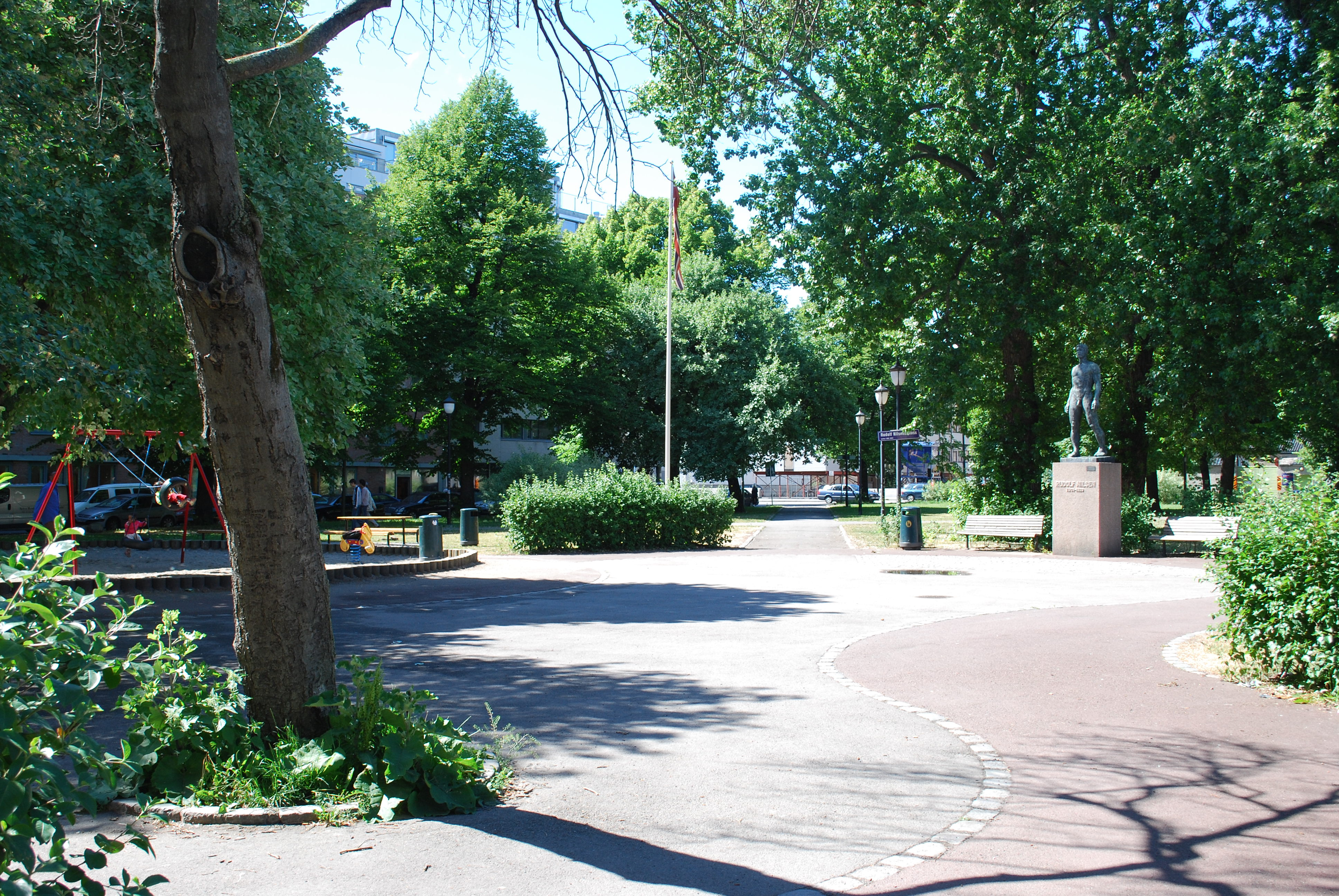
Rudolf Nilsens plass, built with support from Handlingsprogram Oslo indre øst.

From 1970 there were protests against the tearing down wooden house areas such as Kampen and Rodeløkka, and young people with higher education moved in and took it upon themselves to improve the areas. From 1980, the municipality started a renovation of the city, where apartments were renovated to modern standards, and a few were dismantled. Inner yards were cleaned and made into gardens, and facades were cleaned. This diminished the negative trend. Handlingsprogram Oslo indre øst (Action Programme for the Oslo Inner East) was put into use from 1997 to 2006, with a renovation of public spaces and many other improvements to the citizens' living standards.

The overall effect was that the overpopulated housing almost disappeared during the 20th century, and the quality of apartments and living conditions drastically improved for most of the city. New villa areas were built in the West End and near Bærum, and in satellite towns in the east. Still, the east-west distinction remained and spread into the outer town. In the late 20th century, Oslo continued to have a much larger part of the population in the highest and the lowest income categories than other large cities in Norway, and the geographic boundary lines were stronger: Whereas 11% to 14% of the population of Bergen, Trondheim and Stavanger lived in typical high or low status areas, the number in Oslo was 40% (1994). A tightly built city causes strong limitations: In 2001, 36% of the apartments in Frogner had more than three rooms and a kitchen, whereas the number in Sagene was 10%.

== The East End and the West End in the 21st century ==
=== Incomes, possessions and living standards ===
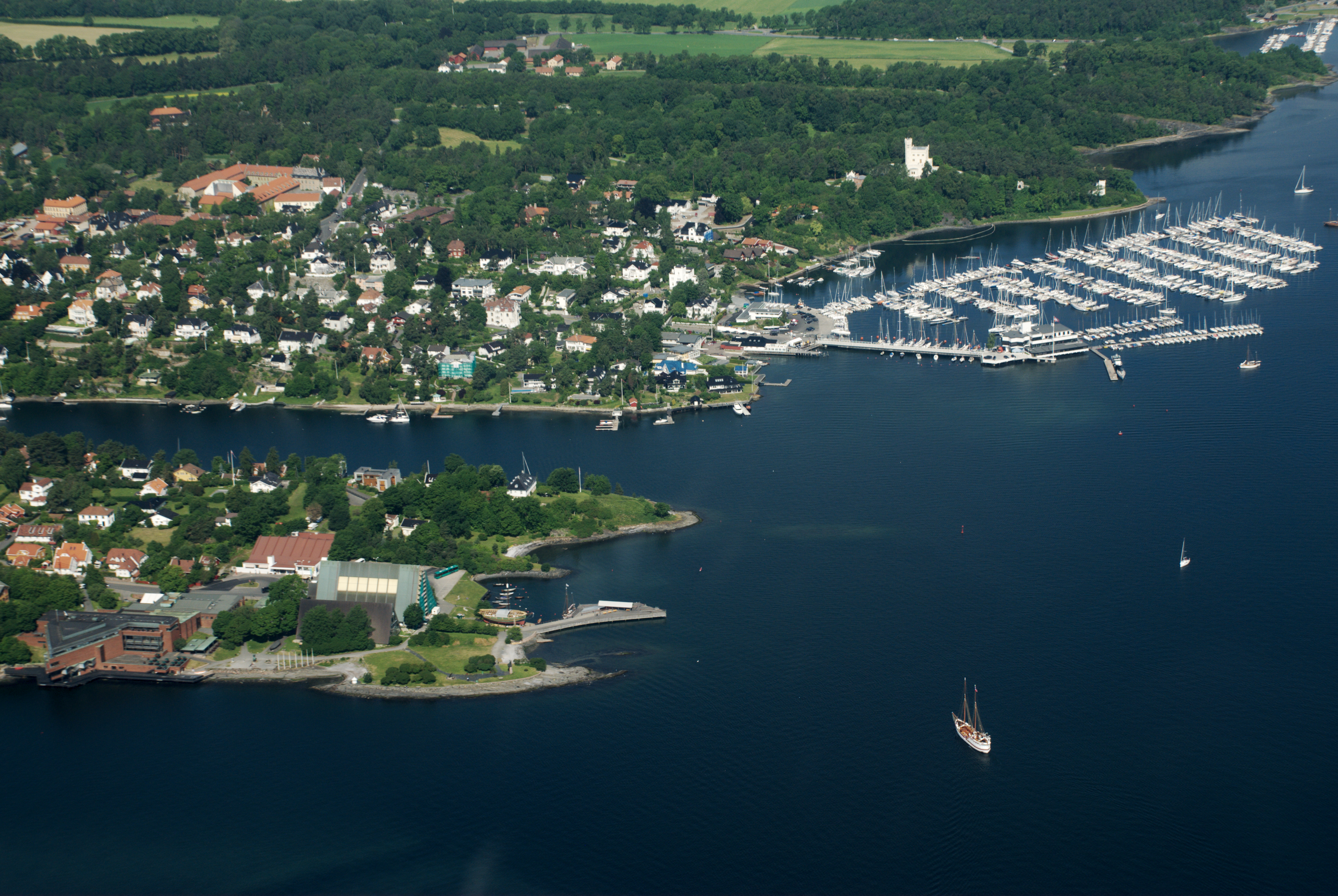
Bygdøy in Frogner, a fine area in the West End. Along with Holmenkollen, it is considered to be Norway's wealthiest area.

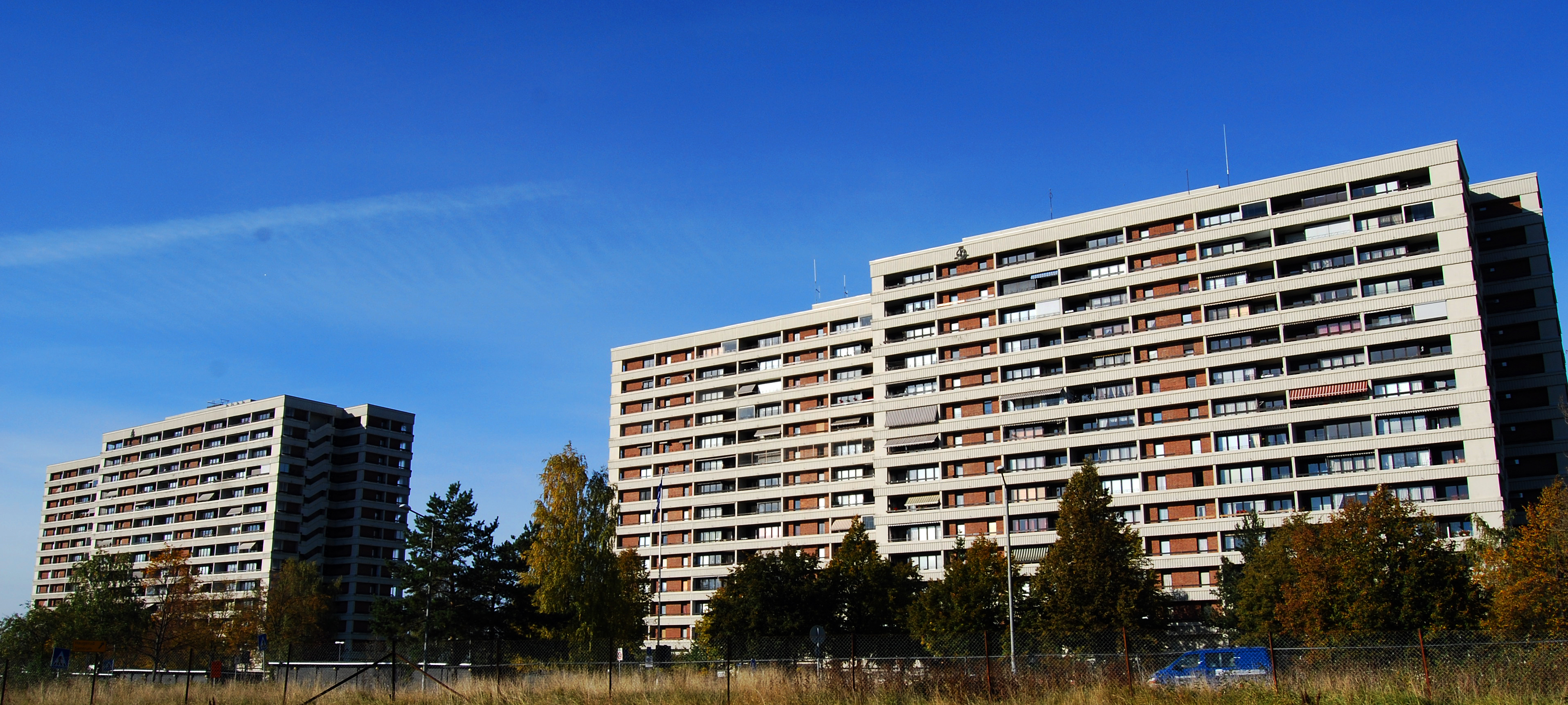
High-rise buildings on Nåkkves vei in Tveita, a satellite town in the East End.

The differences in living standards, incomes and possessions between the east and the west are significant even in the 21st century, which can be seen from the table below. Most people who do not have access to quality living and modern security live in the East End, but this is only a small part of the population. Most people who have access to large economic resources live in the West End, but this is also a small part of the population. Those workers and pensioners that form the majority are divided fairly equally in the income and living standard scales, and the difference between the East End and the West End is not so sharp as it used to be. Seen from a statistic viewpoint, the district of St. Hanshaugen is located in the inner west, with its very young population, and the district of Østensjø in the outer east, near each other, and far away from the extremes.

The differences between the East End and the West End in regard of people's own views of their health and various forms of reduced living standards are significant. The biggest health problems in the 21st century are found among the elderly and among immigrants from non-western countries, according to a study requested by the municipality of Oslo, conducted in 2007.

Women in outer west districts live the longest and have a life expectancy of 83 years, that of men being 78 to 80 years. Compared to this, the average life expectancy in the inner east is 78 years for women and almost 72 years for men. Men in the district of Sagene have the lowest average life expectancy in Norway with only 68 years (2002–2004).

The employment situation is better in the west, especially among people over 55 years. The number of people with social care as their main source of income varies between 12% and 13% in the areas in the west, and between 16% and 20% in the east. The number of people receiving social help for themselves or their family members in the West End varied in 2008 between 1.9% in the districts of Ullern and Vestre Aker and 4.5% in the district of St. Hanshaugen, in the East End between 4.5% in the district of Alna and 11.6% in the district of Gamle Oslo.

The income division follows the east-west distinction systematically. In 2001, the average household income for families with older children varied between 364,000 and 515,000 NOK in the East End districts (excluding Nordstrand) and between 508,000 and 712,000 NOK in the West End districts. The table below with figures for all tax payers in 2007 strengthens this viewpoint. The average income varies much more from year to year in Ullern and Vestre Aker than in other districts, for instance 928,000 NOK in Ullern in 2005, 522,000 NOK in 2006, because the average income is affected by capital income and changes in tax regulations. Taxable possessions are distributed, as shown in the table, with large differences between the districts, with East End from 292,000 NOK (Grorud and Gamle Oslo) to 477,000 NOK (Østensjø), in the West End from 437,000 NOK (St. Hanshaugen) to 3,050,000 NOK (Vestre Aker). Only a small part of the market value of the apartments is taxable, which is why these figures give an imprecise view about the possession situation - the market value of apartments is much higher in the West End than in the East End and the differences in factual market values are larger than what the table shows. The low figures for the five districts in the inner city are related to the fact that the population of young tax payers there is very high compared to that in the rest of the city and the country of Norway.

Incomes and possessions divided by districts in Oslo, 2007. All figures in thousands of NOK
District	Gross income 2007, average	Gross income 2007, median	Taxable gross possessions 2007, average	Taxable gross possessions 2007, median
East End
Alna	292	279	382	221
Bjerke	310	287	420	211
Gamle Oslo	297	280	292	113
Grorud	281	270	364	202
Grünerløkka	308	291	292	106
Sagene	316	306	319	127
Stovner	290	268	401	229
Søndre Nordstrand	294	272	362	199
Østensjø	331	272	477	255
Nordstrand	418	324	876	304
West End
Frogner	465	323	1592	186
Nordre Aker	406	338	796	301
St. Hanshaugen	353	311	437	129
Ullern	575	376	2858	469
Vestre Aker	599	365	3050	478

Of 85,000 children in poor families in Norway 2006, 15,900 lived in Oslo, which comprises 14.7% of all children in Oslo compared to 7.9% in the entire country of Norway. Gamle Oslo had the highest number of all municipalities and districts in the country with 32.5% of all children in poor families. The figures for Grünerløkka and Sagene were 25.2% and 21.8% respectively, the four districts in Groruddalen and Søndre Nordstrand were between 18% and 20%, the inner west between 12% and 14%, Østensjø 10% and the outer west 5%. 78% of the children are children of immigrant families from outside the west. These families are marked by low employment and large families. The division by districts is also explained by the fact that there are apartments with low prices and many municipal apartments. The high rate of child poverty in Oslo is mostly an effect of the large immigration to the city and the immigrants' problems to establish themselves in the job market and receive enough income to support large families.

Apartment prices in the West End rose more than the prices in the East End in the 21st century. From 2003 to 2006 prices in the districts of Stovner, Grorud and Søndre Nordstrand rose by less than 25%, and the prices in Frogner, St. Hanshaugen and Ullern rose by around 40%. All five West End districts had higher price increases than the highest increase in the East End. The price per square metre for apartments varied in November 2008 in the East End from 21,000 in Søndre Nordstrand to 33,000 in Sagene, and in the West End from 36,200 in Nordre Aker to 43,200 in Frogner.

In a study by the municipality of Oslo, the answers about the overall impression of one's living area, how fine it is there and how proud one is of living there, the outer west got the best result. In the inner west the population is a bit more satisfied than in the inner east. Of all East End districts, Østensjø has clearly the most satisfied population.

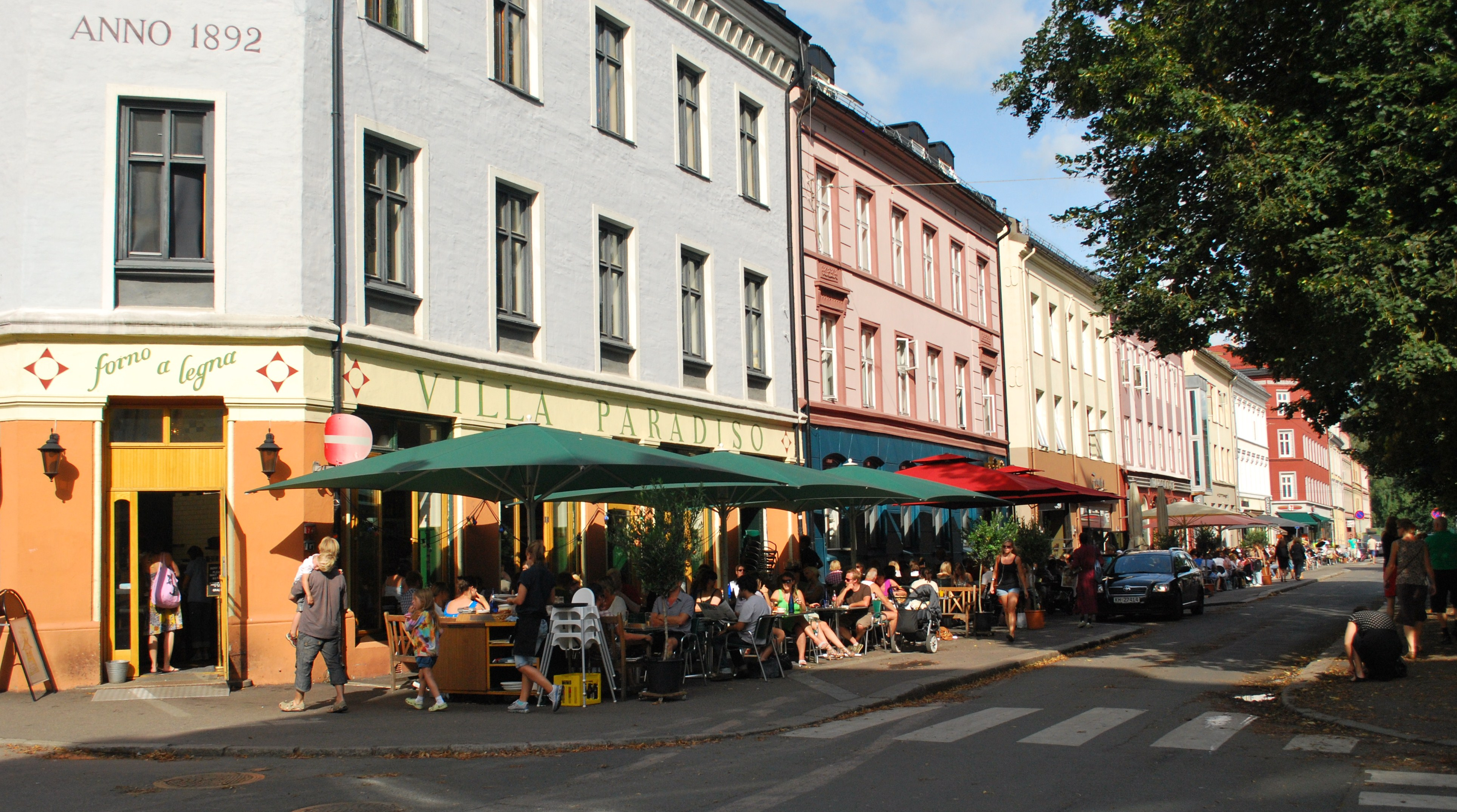
Grünerløkka, Grüners gate near Olaf Ryes plass.

Oslo's neighbouring municipalities follow the east-west boundary line. Apartment prices in 2009 were between 20% and 40% higher in neighbouring municipalities in the west (Asker and Bærum) than in neighbouring municipalities in the east (Follo and Nedre Romerike). The incomes are similarly divided, with differences from a couple per cent to about 50% between different municipalities and types of families.

The districts in the inner east have under the past 20 years had a significantly strong increase in the number of inhabitants with higher education (college or university education among inhabitants from 30 to 59 years). Having been under the average in the city in 1995, the districts of Sagene and Grünerløkka had in 2007 about eight and five per cent over the average respectively, and have almost caught up with the leap forward made by St. Hanshaugen and Frogner. This change is partly due to the fact that the districts in the East End have a large number of inhabitants under 40 years, age groups with much higher education than age groups over 50 years.

=== Politics ===
The east-west distinction is prominent in politics in Oslo in the 21st century. The distribution of candidates on election ballots is given considerate note, and it is difficult for parties to prevent the election lists from reflecting the West End. Of the byråden (city council) in autumn 2009, a 32-year-old from the Progress Party lives in Grünerløkka, the six others live in the West End. Participation in elections is the strongest in the west: in the municipal elections in 2007, 68.5% of the district of Vestre Aker participated, while Gamle Oslo and Grünerløkka were the lowest with less than 52%. Østensjø was clearly the highest in the East End with 63%. Election participation in the outer west was about 10% higher than in Groruddalen and Søndre Nordstrand.

The old domination of the Labour Party and the Conservative Party is almost gone. In the 2007 election, the Conservative Party received about 5% more votes in Oslo than in average in the country, the Labour Party about the same number as in the rest of the country. The votes for the Conservative Party vary by district from 26.6% in St. Hanshaugen to 45.5% (Vestre Aker) in the west, in the east from 12.0% in Grorud to 19.0% in Østensjø. Votes for the Labour Party vary from 15.3% (Vestre Aker) to 26.8% (Nordre Aker) in the west, in the east from 32.2% in Grünerløkka to 44.4% in Grorud. Left-wing parties are strong in the west and inner east, the Progress Party is weak in the inner city and strong in the outskirts, regardless of the east-west distinction, the Socialist Left Party is the strongest in the inner east and a bit stronger in the outer east than in the west.

=== Language and use of first names ===
Because of the social differences between the East End and the West End, there have traditionally been sociolinguistic differences between the two parts of the city. The colloquial language of the East End is based on the Oslo dialect (austkantsmål), whereas the colloquial language in the West End is based on the educated bokmål (riksmål) of the upper class, which has evolved into today's standard variation of eastern Norwegian. There have therefore been two colloquial languages in the city side by side for a long time, with a significant division based on social differences.

There are furthermore differences between the dialects and the sociolects in the East End and the West End, but the most characteristic parts, especially in the East End language, are in the process of being disused, with the general development that affects the entire eastern part of Norway, where local dialects and sociolects are threatened by the standard variety of eastern Norwegian. Increased education levels, higher use of mass media and higher social mobility help towards this development.

A-endings ("gata"), diphthongs ("aleine", "blei"), the thick l and stress on the first syllable ("bannan") are traditional signs of the East End language. The West End language, based on educated bokmål, has the utrum and en-endings (masculine endings on feminine words, such as "gaten" rather than "gata"), significantly fewer diphthongs ("alene", "ble") and other expressions and also a partially different vocabulary than the East End language, basically a language that is more like Danish in most of the districts. The West End language has also changed in the past years, but less so than the East End language, with for example higher tolerance for a-endings on some words. The most formal forms of language and conversation in the West End are seen as old-fashioned by many young people.

As of 2007, almost every citizen below 25 years pronounced the city's name as /uʃlu/, rather than /uslu/. In the West End, 90 % of the age group between 25 and 50 of the women and 63 % of the men did so. For many decades, this pronunciation was limited to sociolects in the East End. Characteristic forms of language in Oslo are on their way to becoming disused, for example forms such as "a'Kari" and "n'Per".

In the East End, the Oslo Metro is colloquially called banen ("the rail"), which stems from official name T-bane (t for tunnel), coined in the 1960s. In the West End (and in Bærum), the metro is often called trikken ("the tramway"), because as a local railway connection, it received the same colloquial name as the city tram line (bytrikken), because the trams were in use for many years before they were coupled together with the eastern metro lines. When trikken is used as a name for the metro, "blåtrikken" is often also used for the city's tram lines, because the tram cars have been blue in colour for many years.

There are significant differences in what first names are popular in the East End and in the West End. Name fashions change, geographically and socially, from the city centre to the outskirts and from the upper class to the worker class. The main image is that the West End and Bærum set the trends for first names in Norway, the East End and the rest of the country follow behind.

The newest data on the name situation at district level detail is from 1997. At that time, typical West End names were Henrik, Carl, Haakon, Bendik, Jens, Peder, William, Magnus, Axel, Nora, Thea, Andrea, Anna, Cecilie, Hanna, Hedda, Julie, Oda, Vibeke and Vilde. Many of them were very common names in the last turn of the 20th century, and with Norwegian and Nordic origins, including many names of royalty. The tradition that royalty names are more common in the West End is related to the fact that the West End, with its bourgeois, was closely related to Denmark for a long time, and therefore people gave their children conservative, Danish names. This tradition still survives to this day, although at a lesser level than before.

Typical East End names were Daniel, Glenn, Tommy, Christer, Frank, Johnny, Anita, Jeannette, Mona, Nadia and Monica. Names such as Linda, Jeannette, Kim, Patrick and Robin were first taken into use in the West End, but are today most used in the East End. Many East End names trace their origins from English names. A group of names has been neutral in regard to the east-west division: Bente, Elin, Grete, Gunn, Merete, Siv, Espen, Geir, Kristian, Markus, Simon, Sindre, Thomas, Johan, Jens.

Immigration has changed the situation. In 2008, 120 boys from Oslo were named Mohammad, and this was the most common name among boys born in Oslo in that year. For the 21st century, there is not yet data about use of names divided between the East End and the West End, or about whether the differences between the East End and the West End have diminished. These differences were not on their way out in 1997.

=== Immigration ===
The large, new immigrant population in Oslo has divided itself among the east-west division.

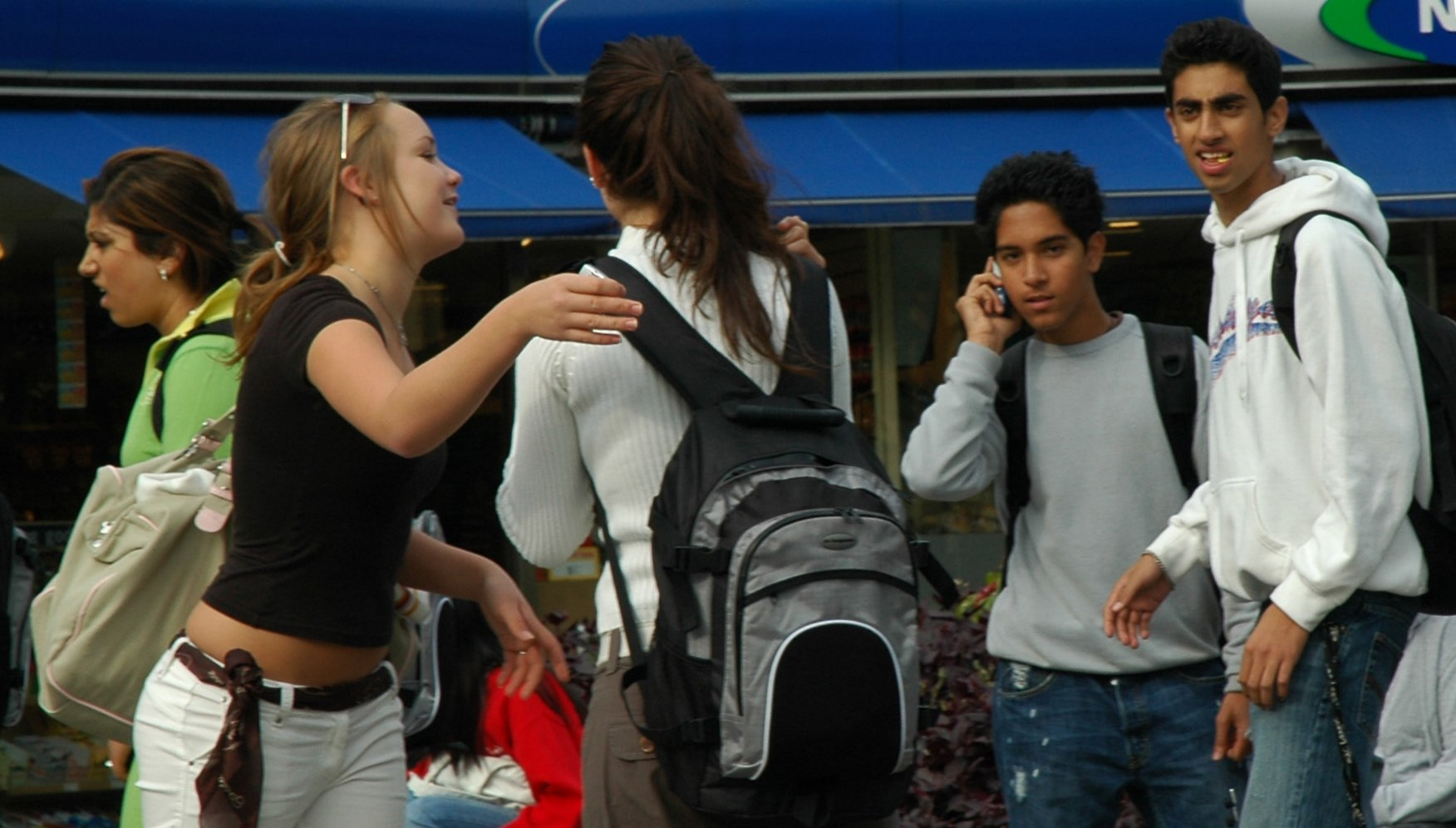
Youth in Oslo, with roots in many countries in the world.

Immigrants from the Nordic countries, western Europe, new EU countries in central Europe and eastern Europe, and North America tend to succeed well in Norway. Of the about 40,000 (1 January 2009) people from these areas, about 18,000 live in the West End. Immigrants from other European countries, Africa, Central America, South America, and Asia have more difficulties succeeding in the Norwegian society, and more problems getting a job matching their level of education and other resources. Of these about 112,000 immigrants, about 15,000 live in the West End.

The concentration of immigrants from countries outside of Europe in some districts and suburbs has received sustained attention in public debate. In bydel Alna there are more non-Western immigrants than in any other municipality outside of Oslo and the part of the non-Western immigrant population in some suburbs is above 60 percent of the population (Smedstua and Rommen in bydel Stovner and Bjørnerud in bydel Søndre Nordstrand). The concentration in Oslo decreased somewhat from 1998 to 2008, however. No areas with high concentration has a great concentration of one nationality, here the highest number is around 20 percent Pakistanis at Bjørnerud. No area of Oslo has the signs that are commonly used to describe a ghetto (marked dilapidation, high criminality, significant poverty, and social misery). Compared to big cities elsewhere in Europe with high concentration of people from other continents, Oslo has good conditions.

There are large differences inside this group of immigrants and many succeed well, but on average the group shows significantly low employment and income, and more health problems than the rest of the city's population.

In the 123 municipal grade schools in Oslo, pupils speaking a minority language form the majority in 53 schools (semester 2009–2010). All of these are located in the East End. It has become common in the East End for children to grow up with a large number of peers that have an ethnic background from a society that is quite different from the Norwegian society.

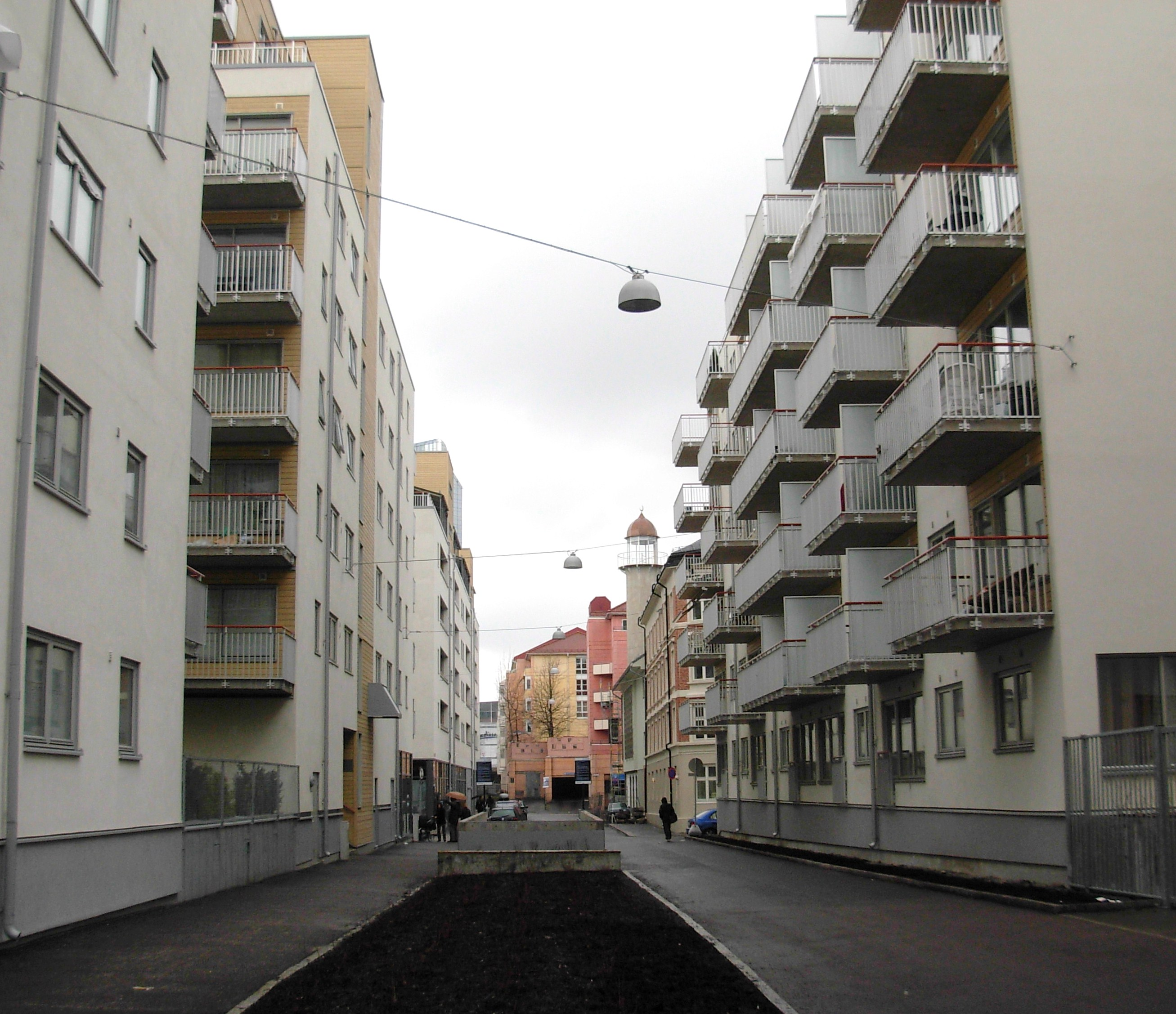
Disputed apartment buildings: Will these apartments strengthen the east-west distinction? Grønlandskvartalene, Rubina Ranas gate, Grønland.

Since the 1970s, immigrants from Asia and Africa have owned small businesses, especially food stores and restaurants. In the district of Grønland and in the Hausmann area the street view is dominated by businesses owned by immigrants from other parts of the world.

== Sources ==
=== Printed sources ===
- Oslo byleksikon
- Oslo bys historie. Oslo, Cappelen, 1990–1994. The boundaries between the East End and the West End are discussed in volume 3 page 379 and volume 4 page 45
- Knut Kjelstadli and Jan Elvind Myhre: Oslo - spenningenes by. Oslohistorie. Oslo, Pax, 1995. ISBN 82-530-1745-6. The book combines critical division (chapters about the history of individual companies, society club, individual areas etc.) with an overall view and long lines of development of the quality of life and class distinction in Oslo. Well written and quite lightly read.
- Gabriel Øidne: Østkant og vestkant i Oslos politiske historie. Sosial og politisk struktur i Oslo 1906-69. Oslo, Gyldendal, 1973. 168 pages. ISBN 82-05-05994-2.
- Pål Henry Engh and Arne Gunnarsjaa: Oslo. En arkitekturguide. Oslo: Universitetsforlaget, 1984. ISBN 82-00-05961-8
- Janne Bondi Johannessen and Kristin Hagen (ed.): Språk i Oslo. Ny forskning om talespråk. Oslo, Novus, 2008. ISBN 978-82-7099-471-7.

=== Online sources ===
- Statistisk årbok for Oslo, municipality of Oslo, department of development and competence (accessed 24 October 2009)
- Oppdatert levekårsindeks for bydelene i Oslo 2006, pp. 4-14 in Oslospeilet #6/2006. Gives statistics and commentary about education, social support recipients, unemployment, death rates etc.
- Magne Bråthen, Anne Britt Djuve, Tor Dølvik, Kåre Hagen, Gudmund Hernes, Roy A. Nielsen: Levekår på vandring. Velstand og marginalisering i Oslo. Fafo report 2007:05, 230 pages. Includes a comprehensive documentation of the quality of life in Oslo.
- Handlingsprogrammet Oslo indre øst, 2006. (accessed 27 November 2007). Gives information about many projects with the aim of improving the quality of growing up, apartments, the common areas and milieu etc.
