= Norwegian Sociology Canon =

The Norwegian Sociology Canon (Norwegian: Norsk sosiologisk kanon) is an award presented from 2009 to 2011 to 25 nonfiction texts, that are considered to have had the greatest influence on sociology in Norway. The list of works was published in the journal of the Norwegian Sociology Association (Norwegian: Norsk sosiologforening).

The jury that created the list was composed of Willy Pedersen (chair), Andreas Hompland, Cathrine Holst, Ida Hjelde, and Ola Korsnes. The criteria for selection were "professional originality and quality, professional impact, social impact, craftsmanship and methodological soundness, and literary value."

== List ==
Author	Title	Published	External link
Eilert Sundt	Om giftermål i Norge (Marriage in Norway)	1855	Full text
Eilert Sundt	Om sædelighets-tilstanden i Norge (Morality in Norway)	1857, 1864, 1866	Full text 1 Full text 3
Nils Christie	Fangevoktere i konsentrasjonsleire (Prison Guards in Concentration Camps)	1952	National Library
Hans Skjervheim	Deltakar og tilskodar og andre essays (Participant and Onlooker, and Other Essays)	1976	National Library
Vilhelm Aubert	Om straffens sosiale funksjon (The Social Function of Punishment)	1954	National Library
Gabriel Øidne	Litt om motsetninga mellom Austlandet og Vestlandet (On the Distinction Between Eastern and Western Norway), in Syn og Segn	1957	
Vilhelm Aubert, Ulf Torgersen, Tore Lindbekk, Sonja Pollan, & Karl Tangen	Akademikere i norsk samfunnsstruktur (Academics in Norwegian Social Structure), in Tidsskrift for samfunnsforskning	1960	
Sverre Lysgaard	Arbeiderkollektivet: en studie i de underordnedes sosiologi (The Workers' Collective: A Study in the Sociology of Subordinates)	1961	National Library
Harriet Holter	Kjønnsroller og sosial struktur (Gender Roles and Social Structure), originally published in the anthology Kvinners liv og arbeid (edited by Dahlström et al.)	1962	National Library
Vilhelm Aubert	Sosiologi (Sociology)	1964	National Library
Ottar Brox	Avvisning av storsamfunnet som økonomisk tilpasningsform (Rejection of Mainstream Society as a Form of Economic Adjustment), in Tidsskrift for samfunnsforskning	1964	
Yngvar Løchen	Idealer og realiteter i et psykiatrisk sykehus (Ideals and Realities in a Psychiatric Hospital)	1965	National Library
Thomas Mathiesen	The Defences of the Weak: A Sociological Study of a Norwegian Correctional Institution	1965	
Stein Rokkan	Numerisk demokrati og korporativ pluralisme: To beslutningskanaler i norsk politikk (Numerical Democracy and Corporate Pluralism: Two Decision Channels in Norwegian Politics)	1966	National Library
Dag Østerberg	Forståelsesformer. Et filosofisk bidrag (Forms of Understanding: A Philosophical Contribution)	1966	National Library
Ole-Jørgen Skog	The Collectivity of Drinking Cultures	1985	
Kari Wærness	The Rationality of Caring	1984	
Harriet Holter (ed.)	Patriarchy in a Welfare Society	1984	ISBN 82-00-07058-1
Jon Elster	Ulysses and the Sirens. Studies in Rationality and Irrationality	1979	
Cato Wadel	Hva er arbeid? (What is Work?), in Tidsskrift for samfunnsforskning nos. 5-6 1977	1977	
Natalie Rogoff Ramsøy	Sosial mobilitet i Norge: En studie av endring i levekår og sosial status basert på livshistorier til 3400 norske menn (Social Mobility in Norway: A Study of Changes in Living Conditions and Social Status Based on Life Stories of 3,400 Norwegian Men)	1977	National Library
Gudmund Hernes	Makt og avmakt: En begrepsanalyse (Power and Powerlessness: A Conceptual Analysis)	1975	National Library
Stein Bråten	Model Monopoly and Communication: Systems Theoretical Notes on Democratization	1973	
Johan Galtung	Imperialismen: en strukturalistisk teori (A Structural Theory of Imperialism)	1971	
Natalie Rogoff Ramsøy (ed.)	Det norske samfunn (Norwegian Society)	1968	National Library
