= Ottar Brox =

Norwegian politician (1932–2024)

- Born: 30 August 1932; Torsken, Norway
- Died: 16 February 2024 (aged 91)

Ottar Brox (30 August 1932 – 16 February 2024) was a Norwegian authority in social science and a politician for the Socialist Left Party. He was professor of sociology at the University of Tromsø from 1972 to 1984, and later associate professor while working as head of research at the Norwegian Institute for Urban and Regional Research. In the Fall of 1993, Brox was a Fellow at the Swedish Collegium for Advanced Study in Uppsala, Sweden. He was awarded an honorary doctorate by the Norwegian University of Life Sciences in 2019.

== Life and career ==
Brox graduated as an agronomist from Norwegian College of Agriculture (NLH, now the Norwegian University of Life Sciences) in 1957, took history and sociology at the University of Oslo in 1959 and 1960 and a Doctor of Science degree from NLH in 1970.

Brox was a member of parliament for Troms in the period 1973–1977. He was not re-elected in 1977. On the local level he has been a member of Bergen city council 1971–1972 and Oslo city council 1991–1995.

Brox wrote a wide range of popularized science literature and participated actively in the public debate. Brox's most influential book is Hva skjer i Nord-Norge? (Norwegian: What is happening in Northern Norway?), published in 1966. This book became a source of inspiration to Northern Norwegian regionalism and caused an upgrading of the economic impact of small vessels on fisheries. The theme of this book was carried on in Nord-Norge: Fra allmenning til koloni. His 1964 article "Avvisning av storsamfunnet som økonomisk tilpasningsform" (Rejection of Mainstream Society as a Form of Economic Adjustment) was selected for the Norwegian Sociology Canon in 2009–2011.

Brox was a member of the Norwegian Academy of Science and Letters. In 2002 he received the Fritt Ord Honorary Award.

Brox held an honorary doctorate at the Memorial University of Newfoundland from 1994, the University of Aberdeen from 2001, the University of Tromsø from 2003 and the Norwegian University of Life Sciences from 2019.

Brox died on 16 February 2024, at the age of 91.

== Sources ==
- "Ottar Brox" (in Norwegian). Storting.
