= Gabriel Øidne =

Norwegian geographer and historian

Gabriel Øidne (11 February 1918 – 4 April 1991) was a Norwegian geographer and historian. Analyzing regional differences in party choice in Norway, he was the first to pinpoint factors relating to relations of production as well as counter-cultural cleavages when describing distinctions between Eastern and Western Norway. He also wrote several works on his native region, Agder, among others on the so-called child migration in older times.

== Early life and education ==
Øidne was born in 1918 in Konsmo. He took the cand.philol. degree at the University of Oslo in 1950, with the paper Audnedalen—a work on his native valley.

== Notable works ==
=== East–West distinctions in Norway ===
Øidne is first and foremost known for the article Litt om motsetninga mellom Austlandet og Vestlandet (On the Distinction Between Eastern and Western Norway), published in the periodical Syn og Segn in 1957 and which was also selected for the Norwegian Sociology Canon in 2009–2011. In it, he began by discrediting popular theories of the impact of topography on people, as well as Andreas Hansen's race theories. Instead, he cited differences in relations of production; Western Norway was more egalitarian than Eastern Norway. Also, he noted that three counter-cultures were rooted Western Norway, creating cleavages towards the rest of Norway: Landsmål, temperance and laity. Politically, Øidne tied these counter-cultures to the Liberal and Christian Democratic parties. He also noted the similarity in support of the Christian Democratic Party and the short-lived Moderate Liberal Party. Thus the article laid the grounds for voter sociology, a subset of political sociology which explores the ties between political party choices and the sociological characteristics of the electorate.

In the same year that Øidne published the article, the first election survey in Norway was held, administered by the Norwegian Institute of Social Research in conjunction with the Norwegian parliamentary election of 1957. Inspirations in addition to Øidne include Paul Lazarsfeld et al.'s book The People's Choice.

Øidne never developed his own theories, limiting himself to only one article, but in later research his theories were developed scientifically by internationally renowned political scientists Henry Valen and Stein Rokkan. Pioneer works were Regional Contrasts in Norwegian Politics, published in 1964 by Rokkan and Valen, and Party Systems and Voter Alignments, published in 1967 by Rokkan and Seymour Martin Lipset.

In 1973 Øidne issued the book Østkant og vestkant i Oslos politiske historie: sosial og politisk struktur i Oslo 1906–69, about the distinctions between eastern and western Oslo.

=== Child migration ===
Øidne also wrote on child migration in the Agder region, among others in the 1955 work Vest-Agder heimkunnskap. The study of this field has traditionally been severely underdeveloped in Norway, but Øidne grew up in this region and was aware of the practice, which took place between c. 1750 and c. 1910. Because of poverty, children in Southern Norway were sent to work during the summer. The migration typically took place from valleys in Vest-Agder—Kvinesdal, Lyngdalen, Audnedalen, Mandalen, Marnardal, Åseral, and Sirdalen as well as Lindesnes—to more affluent areas in Aust-Agder, often near the coast—Høvåg, Landvik, Arendal, and Grimstad as well as Birkenes and Iveland. Many emigrated to the United States when they reached adolescence. In the late phase of his life Øidne assisted the screenwriter and film director Grete Salomonsen Hynnekleiv, who spent many years working on a screenplay, Yohan: The Child Wanderer, https://www.imdb.com/title/tt1230478/?ref_=nm_knf_i1, which she also directed. The film was released in 2010 en featured Kris Kristoffersen as the story-teller.
