= Nordic Gender Institute =

Institute

The Nordic Gender Institute (NIKK) (Norwegian: Nordisk institutt for kunnskap om kjønn), previously Nordic Institute for Women's Studies and Gender Research, was a transnational resource and information centre for gender research and gender equality in the Nordic countries. It was established in 1995 by the Nordic Council of Ministers and closed down in 2011.

The Institute aimed at constituting a bridge between Nordic gender research and equality politics. It co-operated closely with the Nordic Ministers for Co-operation on Gender Equality and the Nordic Executive Committee on Gender Equality. It aimed to contribute to the implementation of the Nordic cooperation programme on gender equality: "Focus on Gender: Working toward an Equal Society" (2006–2010). It initiated projects with the goal of gender equality, coordinating and carrying out investigations, studies, surveys, reports and opinions.

The institute was located at the University of Oslo in Norway. It employed research coordinators, researchers, information advisors, and administrative personnel. In 2010 the staff consisted of six employees from four of the Nordic countries.

== Reorganization ==
In 2011, the Nordic Council of Ministers decided to reorganize NIKK from a Nordic institute to a Nordic co-operation programme. A bidding round was announced in 2012. The co-operation programme was to further develop the information function, administer a Nordic funding scheme for gender equality and serve as project secretariat. The University of Gothenburg and its Swedish Secretariat for Gender Research won the bidding.

Nordic Information on Gender, NIKK, was established in late 2012 and the programme's assignment expired at the end of 2015. As the acronym NIKK was already established in the Nordic region and beyond and associated with information, research and knowledge related to gender and gender equality, the Nordic co-operation programme continues to use NIKK.

=== Impact of Hjernevask ===
Kjersti Nipen have speculated about the decision to restructure NIKK, and its relation to the public debate that followed the seven-part television documentary series Hjernevask ('Brainwash'), by the comedian and documentarian Harald Eia, which aired in spring 2010 on the Norwegian broadcasting service NRK. However, the Norwegian Research Council has denied that the programme had any influence on its decision not to renew the Norwegian research programme on gender in 2011.

The gender researcher Marit Aure speculates, however, that the discussions on gender research, following the programme, might have influenced the decision indirectly, by presenting gender research in Norway as a more established field than actually was the case. Anders Hanneborg, involved in the Norwegian Research Council's committee that evaluated the Norwegian gender research programme's renewal application, explained that the programme was not renewed in order to decentralize and strengthen gender research in Norway. He also denied directly that the television programme Hjernevask was any part of their discussions on the issue. The Norwegian research programme on gender had received funding in 2008 for a period of four years, which expired in 2011. The Norwegian research programme, funded by the Norwegian Research Council, was not related to NIKK, which was funded by the Nordic Council of Ministers.

The Norwegian Parliament, responding to a direct question from Tord Lien of the rightist Progress Party, addressed these television programmes. The core of his criticism concerned the scientific neglect of the biological to the social component. The Minister of Research and Higher Education, Tora Aasland, from the Socialist Left Party, dismissed these criticisms, adding that multidisciplinary gender research in Norway has been evaluated positively, not by television programmes, but through external scientific evaluations of Norwegian research on the field. The Norwegian network for Gender Studies states correlations between Hjernevask and increased discussion on the gender studies in its Annual report 2010.

== Projects ==
The Nordic Gender Institute initiated, co-ordinated, and executed projects that focus on central gender equality issues such as research and development, statements, surveys, and reports. The most recent projects are:

- Gender and Power in the Nordic Countries (2008–2009)
- Gendered Citizenship in Multicultural Europe: The Impact of Contemporary Women's Movements (FEMCIT) (2007–2011)
- Prostitution in the Nordic Countries (2007–2008)
- Multidimensional Discrimination Policies in the Nordic Countries (2007)
- Gender Equality and Quality of Life. A Norwegian Perspective (2007)
- Youth, Gender and Pornography in the Nordic Countries (2004–2006)

A large NIKK study on prostitution for the Nordic ministers of gender equality was presented in October 2008. The study on gender and power was presented in November 2009.

== Magazine ==
NIKK magasin wrote about new and current themes and perspectives on gender research and gender equality politics in the Nordic countries. It was published three times a year: two issues in Scandinavian languages and one issue in English.
