= The Arctic University of Norway =

University in Norway

UiT The Arctic University of Norway
- UiT Norges arktiske universitet (Bokmål); UiT Noregs arktiske universitet (Nynorsk); UiT Norgga árktalaš universitehta (Northern Sami)
- Seal
- Motto: Drivkraft i nord
- Motto in English: Driving force in the North
- Type: Public University
- Established: 1968; 58 years ago
- Affiliations: EUA, UArctic, YERUN, EUGLOH
- Chair: Marianne Elisabeth Johnsen
- Rector: Dag Rune Olsen
- Total staff: 3776 (2021)
- Students: 16,204 (2024)
- Location: Tromsø, Alta, Hammerfest, Harstad and Narvik, Norway; 69°40′49.84″N 18°58′23.28″E
- Campus: Multiple sites
- Website: www.uit.no

The University of Tromsø – The Arctic University of Norway (Norwegian: Universitetet i Tromsø – Norges arktiske universitet; Northern Sami: Romssa universitehta – Norgga árktalaš universitehta) is a state university in Norway and the world's northernmost university. Located in the city of Tromsø, Norway, it was established by an act of parliament in 1968 as Norway's fourth university, and opened in 1972 as University of Tromsø. As of 2024, it is the largest research and educational institution in Northern Norway and the fifth-largest university in Norway. The university's location makes it a natural venue for the development of studies of the region's natural environment, culture, and society.

The main focus of the university's activities is on auroral light research, space science, fishery science, biotechnology, linguistics, mathematics, multicultural societies, Saami culture, telemedicine, epidemiology and a wide spectrum of Arctic research projects. The close vicinity of the Norwegian Polar Institute, the Norwegian Institute of Marine Research and the Polar Environmental Centre gives Tromsø added weight and importance as an international centre for Arctic research. Research activities, however, are not limited to Arctic studies. The university researchers work within a broad range of subjects and are recognised both nationally and internationally.

== History ==
=== Mergers ===
On 1 January 2009, the University of Tromsø merged with Tromsø University College. The college's teacher education department (the descendant of the Tromsø Seminarium first established in 1848) became part of the university's department of education and pedagogy. On 1 August 2013, the university merged with Finnmark University College to form Universitetet i Tromsø – Norges arktiske universitet (The University of Tromsø – The Arctic University of Norway), thereby adding campuses in Alta, Hammerfest, and Kirkenes. On 1 January 2016, Narvik University College and Harstad University College merged with UiT - The Arctic University of Norway. As of September 2024 the university has eleven campus locations in northern Norway, the main campus being Tromsø.

=== Spy case in 2022 ===
In October 2022 a guest researcher at UiT was arrested by the Norwegian Police Security Service and charged with espionage against Norway. The researcher posed as a Brazilian researcher named José Assis Giammaria, but later revealed that he is a Russian citizen by the name Mikhail Valerijevitsj Mikusjin.

Mikusjin is a suspected illegalist who worked for the Russian intelligence service GRU.

== International collaboration ==
UiT is an active member of the University of the Arctic. UArctic is an international cooperative network based in the Circumpolar Arctic region, consisting of more than 200 universities, colleges, and other organizations with an interest in promoting education and research in the Arctic region.

The university also participates in UArctic's mobility program north2north. The aim of that program is to enable students of member institutions to study in different parts of the North.

== Faculties and other units ==
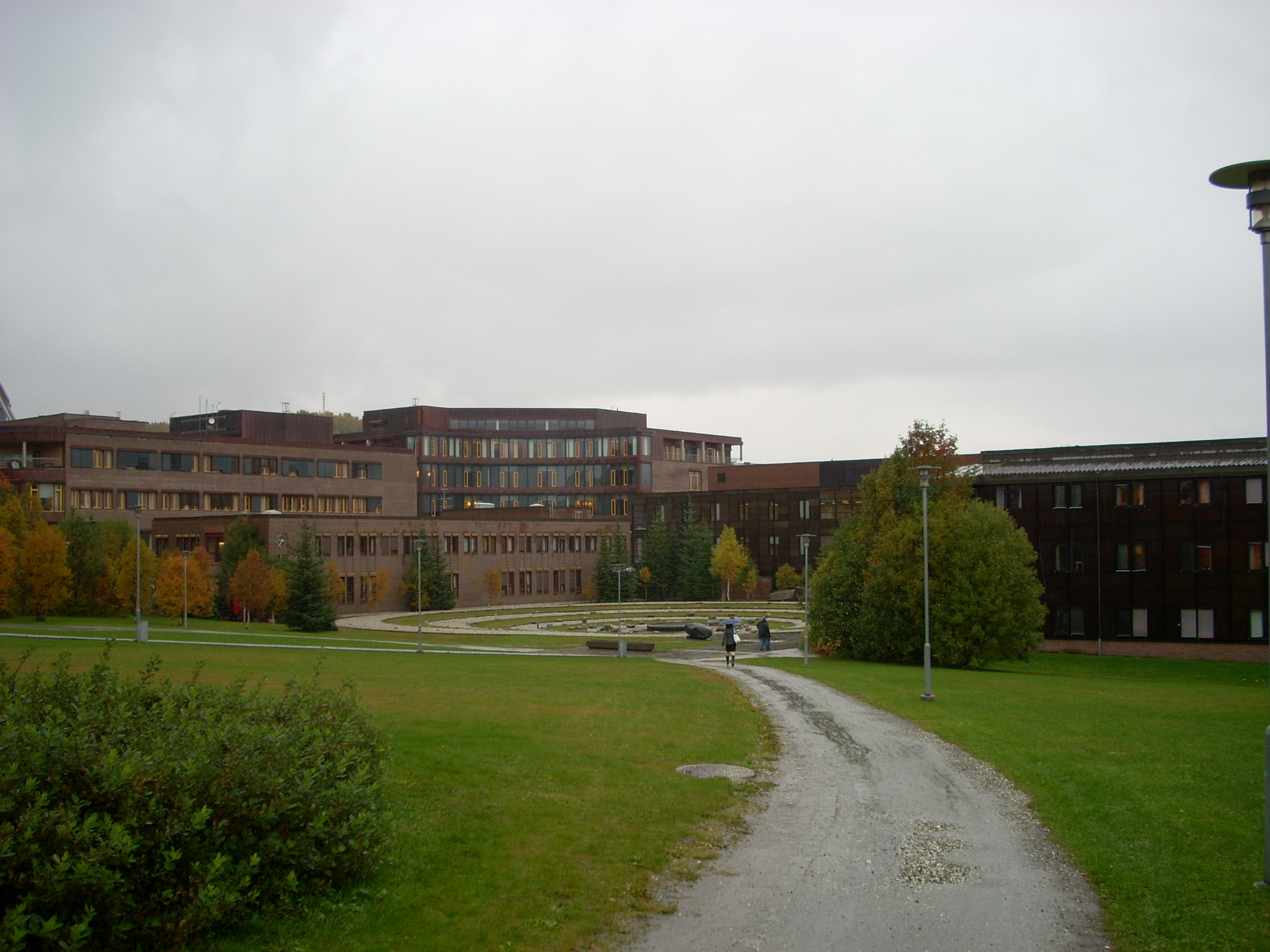
Theoretical Subjects building at Tromsø Campus

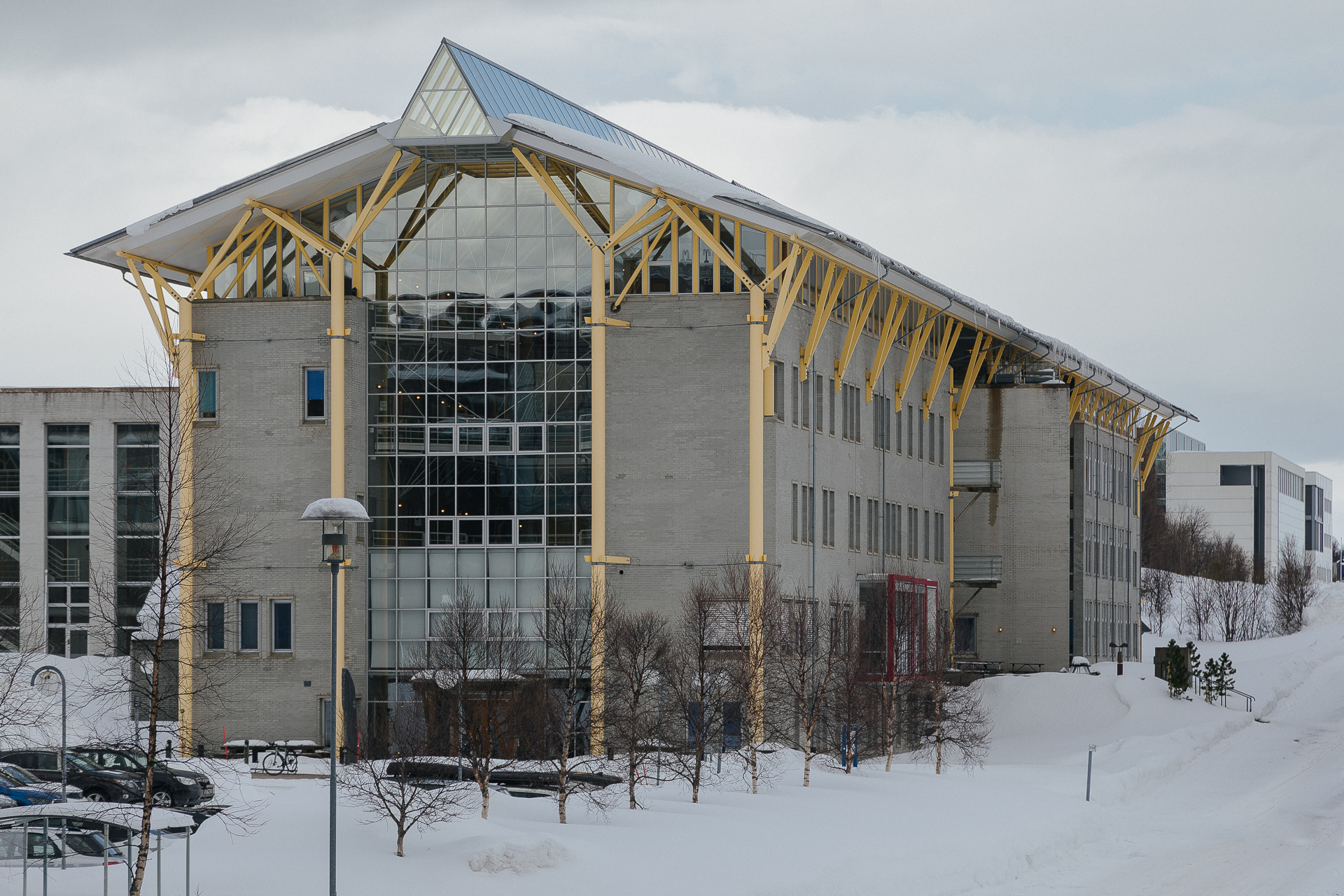
Faculty of Biosciences, Fisheries and Economics

The university is primarily divided into six faculties with multiple subordinate departments and several associated centres.

- Faculty of Biosciences, Fisheries and Economics
  - Department of Arctic and Marine Biology
  - The Norwegian College of Fishery Science
  - School of Business and Economics
  - Norwegian College of Fishery Science
- Faculty of Engineering Science and Technology
  - Department of Industrial Engineering
  - Department of Building, Energy and Material Technology
  - Department of Automation and Process Engineering
  - Department of Computer Science and Computational Engineering
  - Department of Electrical Engineering
- Faculty of Health Sciences
  - Department of Medical Biology
  - Department of Community Medicine
  - Department of Clinical Medicine
  - Department of Pharmacy
  - Department of Clinical Dentistry
  - Department of Psychology
  - Department of Health and Care Sciences
  - School of sport sciences
  - Department of Social Education
- Faculty of Humanities, Social Sciences and Education
  - The Barents Institute
  - Centre for Women's and Gender Research
  - Centre for Peace Studies, Tromsø (CPS)
  - Department of Tourism and Northern Studies
  - Centre for Sami Studies
  - Department of Archaeology, History, Religious Studies and Theology
  - Department of Philosophy
  - Department of History and Religious Studies
  - Department of Culture and Literature
  - Department of Education
  - Department of Language and Linguistics
    - Center for Advanced Study in Theoretical Linguistics
  - Department of Social Sciences
  - Department of Language and Culture
  - Department of Child Welfare and Social Work
- Faculty of Law
  - Norwegian Centre for the Law of the Sea
- The Arctic University Museum of Norway and the Academy of Arts
  - The Arctic University Museum of Norway
  - Conservatory of Music
  - Academy of Arts
- Faculty of Science and Technology
  - Department of Chemistry
  - Department of Computer Science
  - Department of Geosciences
  - Department of Mathematics and Statistics
  - Department of Physics and Technology
  - Department of Technology and Safety
    - Tromsø School of Aviation
  - Lie-Størmer Center for fundamental structures in computational and pure mathematics
- The University Library

The university is host to the iC3 Polar Research Hub, a Norwegian Centre of Excellence that produces ground-breaking insights into how the links between ice sheets, carbon cycles and ocean ecosystems are impacting life on earth. As of late 2024, the interdisciplinary centre consisted of 46 scientists including 25 early career researchers.

== Rankings and reputation ==
University rankings

Global – Overall
- ARWU World: 501–600 (2024)
- QS World: =648 (2026)
- THE World: 501–600 (2024)
- USNWR Global: =577 (2024)

== Buildings & architecture ==
=== Campus Tromsø ===
University Campus Brevika in Tromsø consists of total 34 buildings and objects.

- Administration building, 1989 (John Kristoffersen Arkitektkontor AS)
- Arctic Biology building, 1993 (Arkitektkontoret Amundsen AS)
- Ardna
- Breivang building, 1951 / renovated 2016 (Arkitektkontoret Amundsen AS)
- Breivika III, 1983 (Arkitektkontoret Dalsbøe & Østgaard AS / Borealis Arkitekter AS)
- Exact Sciences (Realfag) building, 1978 (John Kristoffersen Arkitektkontor)
- Lower and Upper Gazebo buildings (Nedre og Øvre Lysthus), 1991 (Blå strek arkitekter AS)
- Medical and Health Faculty building, 1991 (Borealis Arkitekter AS & John Kristoffersen Arkitektkontor AS)
- Museum Botanical Unit (Kvaløyvegen 30), built in 1952 as aquarium (Reidar Kolstrand), taken by museum in 1959, converted to Marine biology station in 1982 (Eigill Hallset), rebuilt and restored in 1999.
- Natural Sciences (Naturfag) building, 1974, extended 1988, restored and rebuilt 2003 (A2-arkitektkontor AS, by architect MNAL Øyvind Ragde, Aall & Løkeland AS Redevelopment: Paul Pincus, Borealis AS)
- Norwegian College of Fishery Science, 1994 (Steinsvik Arkitektkontor AS)
- Northern Lights Observatory, 1971 (Terje Jacobsen & Eigill Hallset)
  - Northern Lights Planetarium / Science Centre of Northern Norway, 1989 (John Kristoffersen Arkitektkontor AS)
- Operations Centre, 1985 (Arkitektkontoret Dalsbøe & Østgaard AS)
- Pharmacy Building, 1998 (Borealis Arkitekter AS)
- Polar Museum
- Theoretical Subjects (Teorifag) building, Houses 1-6, 2004 (Telje-Torp-Aasen Arkitektkontor AS)
- Tromsø University Museum, 1961 (Blakstad & Munthe-Kaas Arkitektkontor, Oslo)
- University Library, 1981 (Arkitektkontoret Dalsbøe & Østgaard AS in cooperation with Ark. MNAL Leif Olav Moen)

== Honorary doctors ==
- Johan Rooryck, Belgium (2022)
- Hans Ragnar Mathisen, Norway (2022)
- Veronica Ann Courtice, South Africa (2022)
- Katherine Richardson, USA (2022)
- Rolf Skår, Norway (2021)
- Gro Harlem Brundtland, Norway (2021)
- Mari Boine, Norway (2018)
- Olav Holt, Norway (2018)
- Richard Horton, UK (2018)
- Arieh Warshel, US (2018)
- Laila Stien, Norway (2015)
- Trond Mohn, Norway (2015)
- Oran R. Young, USA (2015)
- Jonas Gahr Støre, Norway (2011)
- Narve Bjørgo, Norway (2008)
- Ole Henrik Magga, Norway (2008)
- Barbara Neis, Canada (2008)
- Steven Pinker, USA (2008)
- Johan P. Olsen, Norway (2006)
- Jan Raa, Norway (2006)
- Rodolfo Stavenhagen, Mexico (2006)
- Ottar Brox, Norway (2003)
- Erica I.A. Daes, Greece (2003)
- Tor Hagfors, Norway (2003)
- Nawal el-Saadawi, Egypt (2003)
- Tenzin Gyatso, the 14th Dalai Lama, Tibet (2001)
- Mordechai Vanunu, Israel (2001)
- William Nygaard, Norway (1998)
- Salman Rushdie, UK (1998)
- Mikhail Gorbachev, Russia (1998)
- Robert Paine, Canada (1998)
- Susanne Romaine, UK (1998)
- Rigoberta Menchú Tum, Guatemala (1996)
- Carsten Smith, Norway (1995)
- Desmond Mpilo Tutu, South Africa (1994)
- Jørn Dyerberg, Denmark (1993)
- Torstein Bertelsen, Norway (1993)
- Georg Henrik von Wright, Finland (1993)
- Ragnhild Sundby, Norway (1993)
- Helga Marie Hernes, Norway (1993)
- Parzival Copes, Canada (1993)
- Amy van Marken, Netherlands (1987)
- Kjell Bondevik, Norway (1982)
- Peter F. Hjort, Norway (1982)

Russian Foreign Minister Sergey Lavrov received an honorary doctorate at the University of Tromsø in 2011 for having secured an agreement on the dividing line in the Barents Sea but lost his status after 28 February 2022 due to a board decision related to his co-responsibility for the Russian invasion of Ukraine.

== Notable faculty ==
- Nils Jernsletten (born 1934), professor of Sámi and editor of Sámi newspaper Ságat (1964–1966)
- Kirsten Simonsen (born 1946), Danish geographer and sociologist
- Jelena Porsanger (born 1967), Russian Sami ethnographer, university rector
- Hans Munthe-Kaas (born 1961), Norwegian mathematician, former leader of the Abel price committee

== Notable alumni ==
- Monica Kristensen Solås (born 1950), glaciologist, meteorologist, polar explorer and crime novelist
- Svein-Erik Hamran (born 1960), led the development of the RIMFAX for the Mars rover Perseverance
- Sandra Márjá West (born 1990), politician and festival manager of Riddu Riđđu
- Marianne Haukland (born 1989), politician and member of the Standing Committee on Family and Cultural Affairs
- Ine Eriksen Søreide (born 1976), politician, former Minister of Foreign Affairs and leader of the Conservative Party in Norway
- Gunvor Guttorm (born 1958) Sami artist, art historian and academic

== Logo ==
The ravens in the university's logo are Huginn and Muninn. In Norse mythology, Hugin and Munin travel the world for Odin, bringing him news and information. Huginn represents thought and Muninn memory. Ravens are an early Norse symbol, used, for example, on the raven banner.

== See also ==
- Open access in Norway
