= Department of Psychology, University of Oslo =

Department of Psychology
- Psykologisk institutt
- Abbreviation: PSI
- Formation: 1909; 117 years ago
- Type: Institute
- Location: Oslo
- Parent organization: University of Oslo
- Staff: 90 (2015)
- Website: www.sv.uio.no/psi/english/

The Department of Psychology (Norwegian: Psykologisk institutt) at the University of Oslo is the oldest and largest research institute and educational institution in psychology in Norway. It is Norway's main research institution in clinical psychology, cognitive psychology, developmental psychology, personality psychology, and social and cultural psychology, and one of the main research environments in neuroscience. The institute is located in the Harald Schjelderup Building adjacent to Oslo University Hospital, Rikshospitalet in the Gaustad area of Oslo; the building is shared with parts of the Faculty of Medicine, while Oslo University Hospital occupies surrounding buildings. The institute's alumni include two Nobel laureates, Edvard Moser and May-Britt Moser.

== Focus and history ==
The institute has about 90 academic employees and around 1100 students. It has substantial research activities in all fields of psychology, and especially in cognitive neuroscience and personality psychology. It offers PhD, professional, master's and bachelor's programmes in psychology. The institute also includes a neuropsychological clinic. It is divided into six sections:

- Clinical psychology
- Cognitive psychology, neuroscience, neuropsychology
- Health, developmental and personality psychology
- Methodology, work and organisational psychology, cultural and community psychology, social psychology
- Centre of Lifespan Changes in Brain and Cognition (LCBC), a centre given the status of "world leading research centre" by the government in 2015
- Clinical skills training

The Neuropsychological Clinic treats patients referred with suspicion of brain injury. The department also has several laboratories, partly located at Oslo University Hospital. A neurocognitive test lab, e.g., MR scanners is shared between the Department of Psychology and Oslo University Hospital, and is located across the street.

The Department of Psychology cooperates closely with the Faculty of Medicine, Oslo University Hospital and the Norwegian Centre for Violence and Traumatic Stress Studies, among other institutions.

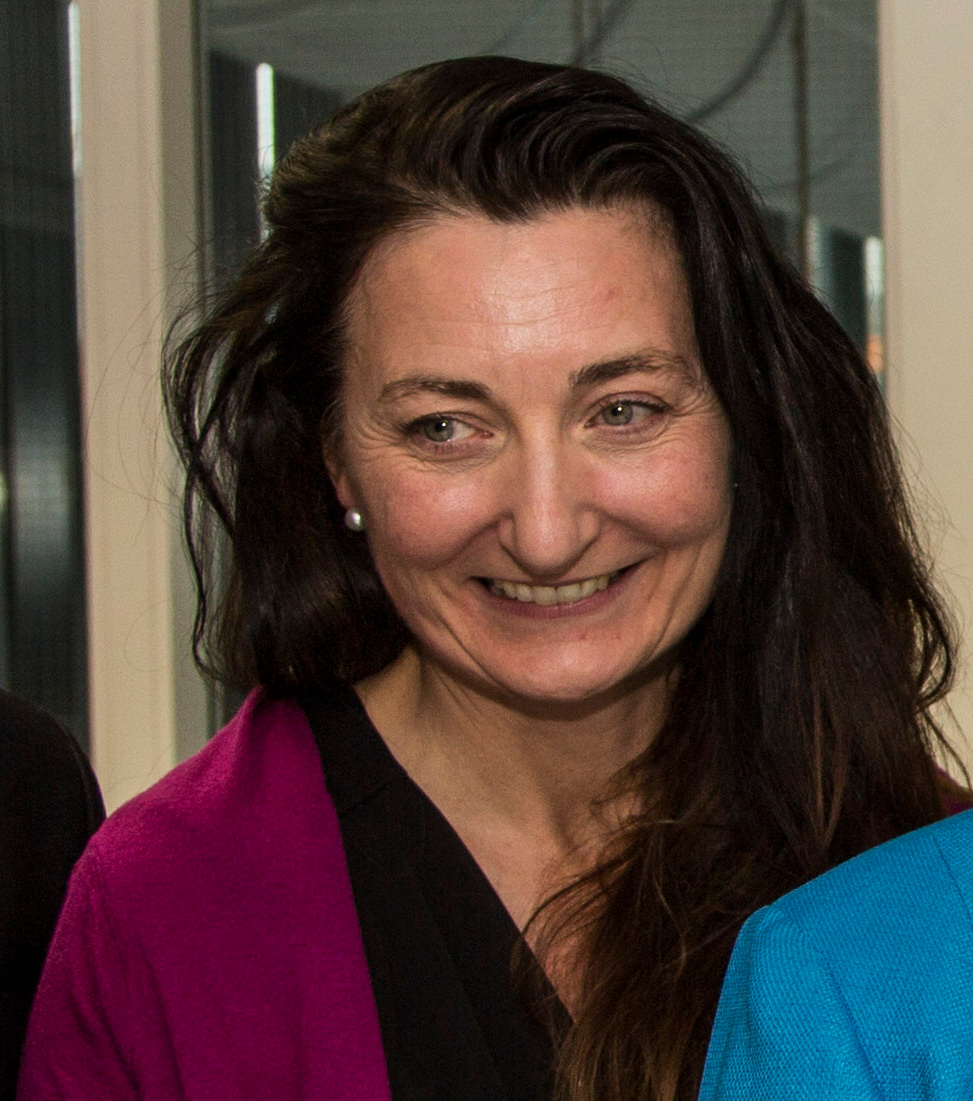
Neuroscientist and Nobel laureate May-Britt Moser

The institute was established in 1909 on the initiative of Anathon Aall. The first chairholder in psychology was Harald Schjelderup, who was appointed by the King-in-Council in 1928. The Department of Psychology was originally part of the Faculty of Humanities, and became part of the Faculty of Social Sciences in 1963. Since then the creation of a separate Faculty of Psychology or a merger with the Faculty of Medicine has been discussed several times. The Department of Psychology in Oslo has had an important role in the development of psychology as a discipline since the early 20th century.

The neuroscientists and Nobel laureates Edvard Moser and May-Britt Moser both started their careers at the institute.

== Notable academics ==
- Stein Andersson, Professor of Clinical and Cognitive Neuropsychology
- Jon Frode Blichfeldt
- Thomas Espeseth, Professor of Cognitive Neurogenetics
- Anders Fjell, Professor of Cognitive Psychology
- Carl Erik Grenness
- Tine Jensen
- Siri Leknes, Professor of Neuroscience
- Svein Mossige
- Harald Schjelderup
- Nora Sveaass
- Odd Arne Tjersland
- Svenn Torgersen
- Kristine Beate Walhovd, Professor of Neuropsychology
- Eivind Ystrøm, Professor of Personality Psychology

== Notable alumni ==
- Edvard Moser, Nobel laureate in medicine
- May-Britt Moser, Nobel laureate in medicine
