= Norwegian Centre for Violence and Traumatic Stress Studies =

Research centre in Oslo, Norway

- Nasjonalt kunnskapssenter om vold og traumatisk stress
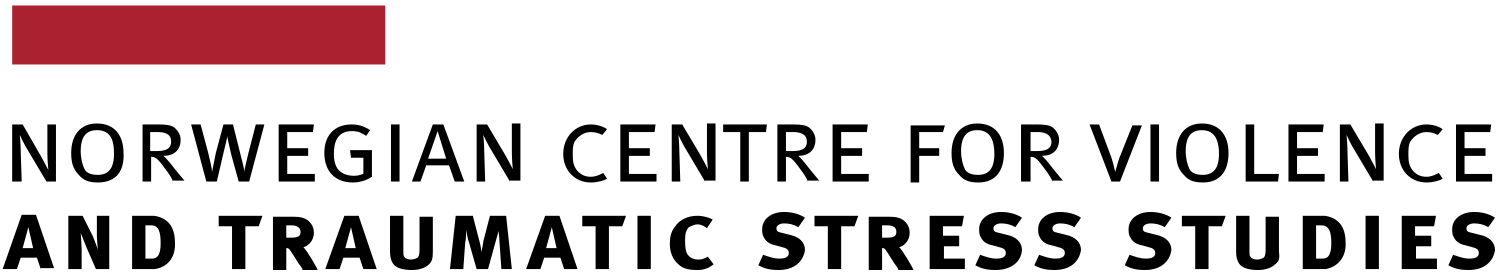
- Abbreviation: NKVTS
- Formation: 2004; 22 years ago
- Type: Government-owned research institute
- Location: Oslo
- Fields: Violence and sexual abuse; disaster management, terrorism, armed conflicts and traumatic stress; and forced migration and refugee health
- Director: Inger Elise Birkeland
- Affiliations: University of Oslo (affiliated institute); Norwegian Research Centre
- Staff: 101 (2019)
- Website: nkvts.no

The Norwegian Centre for Violence and Traumatic Stress Studies (Norwegian: Nasjonalt kunnskapssenter om vold og traumatisk stress, NKVTS) is a research centre in Oslo, Norway, and Norway's national research institution in violence and sexual abuse; disaster management, terrorism, armed conflicts and traumatic stress; and forced migration and refugee health research. It is interdisciplinary and employs experts mainly in psychology, psychiatry, and the social sciences. In addition to carrying out research and related activities, the institute advises the Government of Norway in its areas of expertise and has some official emergency management functions at the national level. NKVTS has 101 employees.

NKVTS was established by the Government of Norway in 2004 through the merger of four research institutions, mainly at the University of Oslo, and was wholly owned by the University of Oslo until 2019 when ownership was transferred to the Norwegian Research Centre, itself owned by four universities. While organised as an independent limited company, it remains an affiliated institute of the University of Oslo and cooperates closely with the Department of Psychology and the Faculty of Medicine, where several of its research professors also hold professorial chairs. The centre was located at Oslo University Hospital, Ullevål 2004–2013, and is now located in Nydalen, Oslo.

NKVTS has its roots in the military and disaster psychiatry research of the University of Oslo and the Norwegian Armed Forces Joint Medical Services from the 1950s. Its oldest predecessor institution was the Division of Disaster Psychiatry, a joint unit of the University of Oslo Faculty of Medicine and the Norwegian Armed Forces, that was established by the chief psychiatrist of the Norwegian Armed Forces, Arne Sund, a pioneer in military psychiatry and the founder of the field of disaster psychiatry. Through Sund's efforts Norway became "an international pioneer in the research on mass killings, war, catastrophes, accidents and all forms of violence." NKVTS has extensive international cooperation and has been represented in various UN bodies, such as the United Nations Committee against Torture.

== History ==
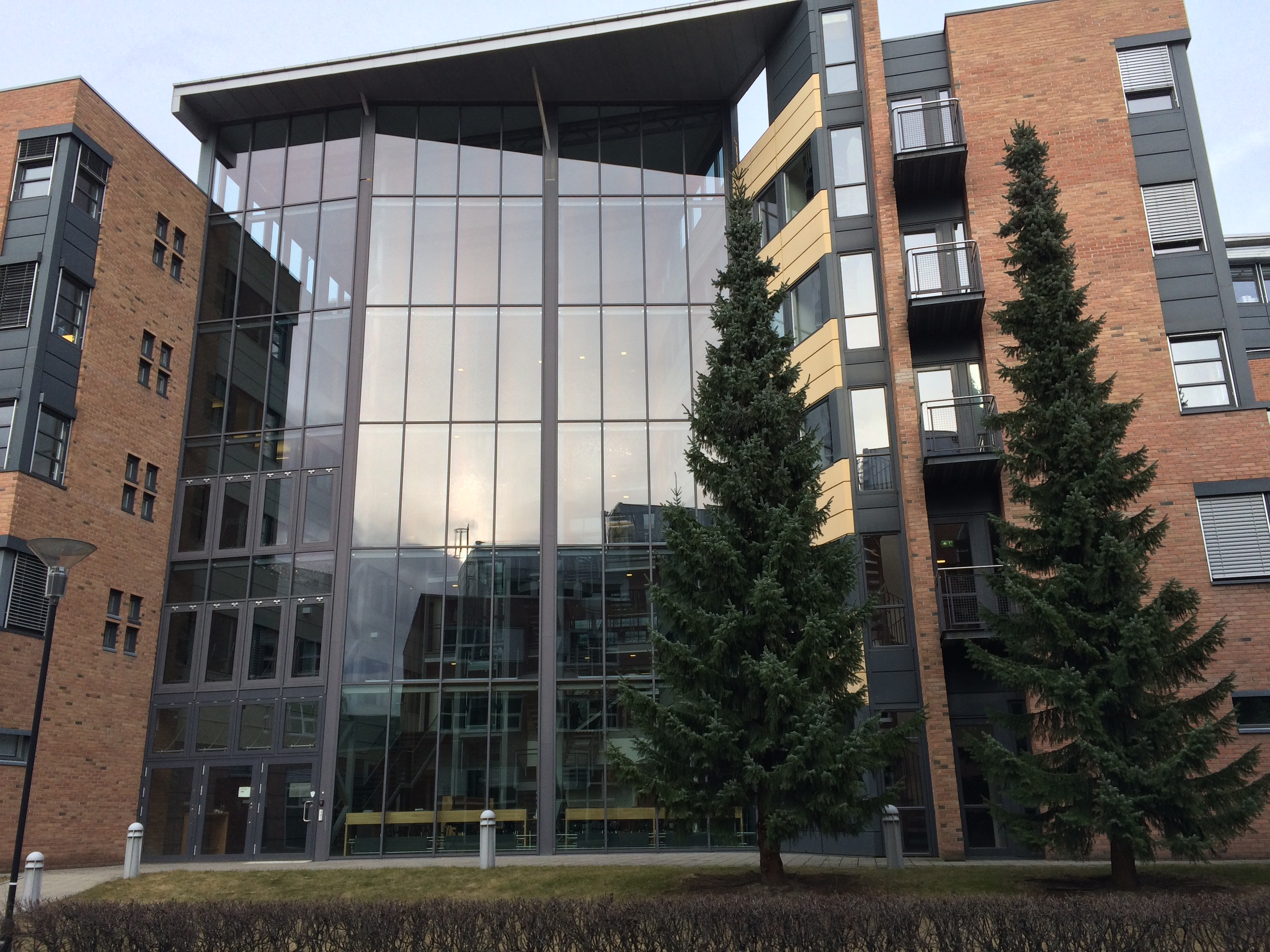
NKVTS' current offices in central Oslo

Lars Weisæth and Leo Eitinger in front of the Division of Disaster Psychiatry

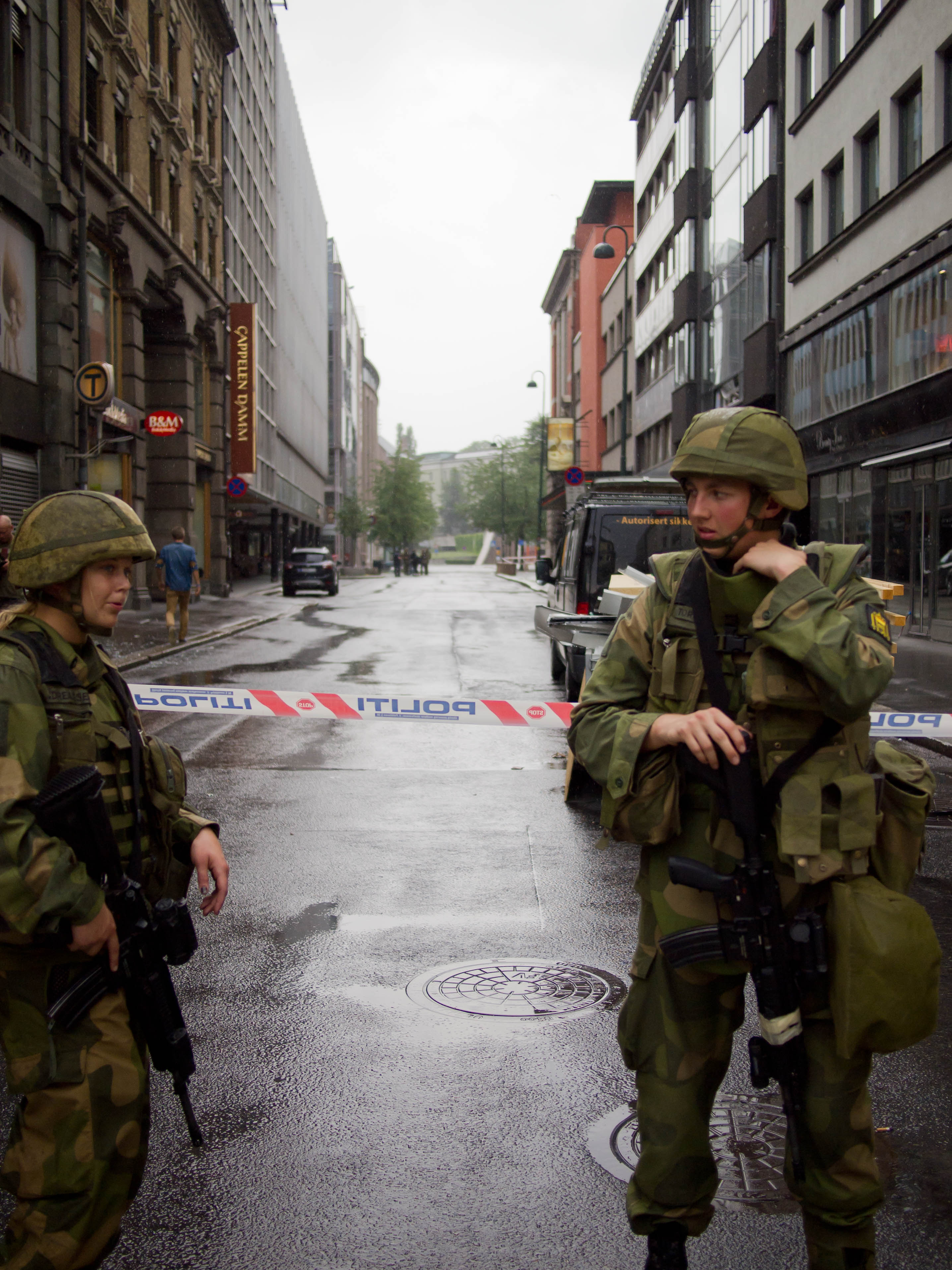
NKVTS is involved in major research projects on the psychological and social impact of terrorism, such as the 2011 Norway attacks, and on the mental health of military personnel

NKVTS was established by the Government in 2004 through the merger of four institutions:

- The Division of Disaster Psychiatry, a joint unit of the University of Oslo Faculty of Medicine and the Norwegian Armed Forces Joint Medical Services, based at Gaustad Hospital
- The Psychosocial Centre for Refugees at the University of Oslo Faculty of Medicine's Department of Psychiatry
- The Norwegian National Resource Center on Child Sexual Abuse at Aker University Hospital, affiliated with the University of Oslo
- The Norwegian Resource Centre for Information and Studies on Violence at Oslo University College

The oldest predecessor institution, the Division of Disaster Psychiatry, has its roots in Leo Eitinger's research on psychological trauma among soldiers, refugees and concentration camp survivors at the University of Oslo from the 1950s. Eitinger's research had a foundational impact on the psychological-psychiatric service of the Norwegian military. From the 1960s military psychiatry research was carried out in cooperation between the University of Oslo and the Norwegian Armed Forces Joint Medical Services, and chief military psychiatrist Arne Sund established Norwegian military psychiatry as leading within NATO; Sund is also regarded as the founder of the newer field of disaster psychiatry. In 1978 the Division of Disaster Psychiatry was established as a formal unit within both the university and the Norwegian Armed Forces Joint Medical Services, with Sund as its director. Through Sund's efforts Norway became "an international pioneer in the research on mass killings, war, catastrophes, accidents and all forms of violence." In 1984 Sund was succeeded by military psychiatrist Lars Weisæth who led the institution until it became part of NKVTS. The Norwegian military's Stress Management Team for International Operations, established in 1996, was part of the Division of Disaster Psychiatry. The Psychosocial Team for Refugees was established by the government as part of the Directorate of Health in 1986, and became a centre at the University of Oslo in 1990. The two other institutions were established by the government in 1995 and 1996. The four institutions were merged to form NKVTS as a joint initiative of the Ministry of Health, the Ministry of Justice and Public Security, the Ministry of Defence, the Ministry of Labour, and the Ministry of Children and Family Affairs.

NKVTS is funded directly by the government. The institute was part of the University of Oslo from its establishment in 2004 until 2019, and remains an affiliated institute of the University of Oslo from 2019. The institute was located at Oslo University Hospital, Ullevål 2004–2013, and is now located in Nydalen, Oslo, in the immediate vicinity of the Ministry of Justice and Public Security. In 2018 the government proposed to integrate NKVTS into the Norwegian Institute of Public Health. In 2019 the government proposed that NKVTS continues as an independent state-owned research institute, and that the government's shares are administered by the Norwegian Research Centre, a research organisation owned by four universities; NKVTS maintains its close academic links with the University of Oslo as an affiliated institute.

The centre has 101 employees (2019). It employs experts in psychology, psychiatry, law, sociology, criminology, social anthropology and other disciplines, with the main emphasis on psychology and psychiatry. Its academic staff include research professors (equivalent to full professors), senior researchers (associate professors), researchers (assistant professors) and a number of postdoctoral fellows, doctoral candidates and research assistants. NKVTS cooperates closely with the Department of Psychology, the Faculty of Medicine and the Faculty of Law at the University of Oslo, where several of its research professors also hold professorial chairs.

Nora Sveaass, then research director for refugee health and forced migration at NKVTS, was elected as a member of the United Nations Committee against Torture in 2005.

NKVTS has major research projects on the psychological and social impact of terrorism, including the 2011 Norway attacks. NKVTS also has several research projects on the psychological impact of natural catastrophes such as the 2004 Indian Ocean earthquake and tsunami, and on child soldiers in Africa, torture, traumatised refugees, war victims and soldiers, child sexual abuse and sexual violence, and violence in close relations.

In addition to carrying out research the centre advises the Government of Norway in its areas of expertise. NKVTS has certain official functions related to emergency management at the national level.

The current director of the institute is Inger Elise Birkeland, a former political adviser to Prime Minister Gro Harlem Brundtland.

B.E. Saunders of the Medical University of South Carolina has described the institute as "one of the most highly respected research organizations in the world dedicated to research on violence and traumatic stress. Since its inception, it has conducted a series of highly sophisticated studies focusing on a wide array of topics, including the prevalence and impact of different forms of violence and abuse among children and adults, mental health treatment of posttraumatic stress disorder and other trauma-related problems, and how best to implement and incorporate evidence-based interventions practices into community service agencies. These studies have had enormous impact not only in Norway, but internationally."

== Notable researchers ==
The list includes researchers at NKVTS' four predecessor institutions.

- Nora Ahlberg, psychologist, former director of the Psychosocial Centre for Refugees
- Solveig Bergman, sociologist, research project manager, former director of NIKK
- Margunn Bjørnholt, sociologist, research professor at NKVTS and professor of sociology at the University of Bergen
- Grete Dyb, psychiatrist, research professor at NKVTS and Professor II in child and adolescent psychiatry at the University of Oslo Institute of Clinical Medicine
- Edvard Hauff, psychiatrist, professor of psychiatry and director of the Psychosocial Centre for Refugees
- Trond Heir, military psychiatrist, research professor at NKVTS and professor II at the University of Oslo Institute of Clinical Medicine
- Are Holen, psychiatrist and psychologist, former researcher at the Division of Disaster Psychiatry
- Tine Jensen, psychologist, research professor at NKVTS and professor of psychology at the University of Oslo Department of Psychology
- Thore Langfeldt, psychologist, former senior researcher at NKVTS
- Nils Johan Lavik, psychiatrist, professor of psychiatry and director of the Psychosocial Centre for Refugees
- Inger-Lise Lien, social anthropologist, research professor at NKVTS
- Ellinor F. Major, psychologist, former senior researcher at the Psychosocial Centre for Refugees
- Jon-Håkon Schultz, educational psychologist, research professor at NKVTS and professor II at the University of Tromsø
- Kristin Skjørten, criminologist, research professor at NKVTS and professor II at the University of Oslo Department of Public and International Law
- Nora Sveaass, psychologist, professor of psychology at the University of Oslo, former senior researcher and research director for refugee health and forced migration at NKVTS, and former member of the United Nations Committee against Torture
- Siri Thoresen, military psychologist, research professor at NKVTS
- Odd Arne Tjersland, psychologist, research professor at NKVTS and professor of clinical psychology at the University of Oslo Department of Psychology
- Arne Sund, military psychiatrist, the founder of disaster psychiatry, professor of disaster psychiatry at the University of Oslo and director of the Division of Disaster Psychiatry
- Lars Weisæth, military psychiatrist, research professor emeritus at NKVTS, professor of disaster psychiatry at the University of Oslo and former director of the Division of Disaster Psychiatry
