= Lars Weisæth =

Norwegian military psychiatrist

Lars Weisæth (born 18 April 1941) is a Norwegian military psychiatrist. He is Research Professor Emeritus at the Norwegian Centre for Violence and Traumatic Stress Studies, Professor Emeritus of Disaster Psychiatry at the Institute of Clinical Medicine at the University of Oslo and a lieutenant-colonel and former chief psychiatrist of the Norwegian Armed Forces Medical Service.

== Career ==
Weisæth graduated as a medical doctor at the University of Oslo in 1968, became a specialist in psychiatry in 1976 and earned his PhD in psychiatry in 1985. He served as a Major in the Norwegian Army as part of the United Nations Interim Force in Lebanon in 1978.

Upon his return to Norway he joined the Division of Disaster Psychiatry, a joint unit of the University of Oslo Faculty of Medicine and the Norwegian Armed Forces medical service. In 1985 he succeeded Arne Sund as Professor of Disaster Psychiatry and Director of the Division of Disaster Psychiatry. He was also chief psychiatrist of the Norwegian Armed Forces Medical Service, with the rank of lieutenant-colonel. He has served as an expert for the Norwegian government and the World Health Organization on numerous occasions.

When the Division of Disaster Psychiatry became part of the newly established Norwegian Centre for Violence and Traumatic Stress Studies he continued as a research director with that organization, while also maintaining his professorship at the University of Oslo.

Weisæth is an expert on military psychiatry, psychotherapy, and psychotraumatology, and is one of Norway's leading experts on crisis psychiatry. His major research projects include survivors of large accidents and natural disasters, and the mental health of military veterans. He often acts as an independent expert in court cases. Weisæth was originally put forward as a psychiatric expert in the trial of Anders Behring Breivik, but was ultimately not appointed, although he commented extensively on the case in the media.

== Awards ==
- Lifetime Achievement Award from the International Society for Traumatic Stress Studies in 1995.
