= Malcolm Hooper =

British pharmacist

Malcolm Hooper is a British pharmacist and emeritus professor of medicinal chemistry at the University of Sunderland. He is best known for his advocacy related to Gulf War syndrome.

== Gulf War Syndrome advisor ==
Hooper is the Chief Scientific Adviser to the British Gulf War Veterans Association.

He has stated his concerns over initial studies that suggested miscarriages and children with physical abnormalities are more common in pregnancies of wives of male Gulf War veterans than those not sent to the region. In a news article in the Sunday Herald, Hooper was referred to as an expert on depleted uranium, and he said that soldiers were harmed by exposure to it during the war. He has also stated that the British Ministry of Defence's position on Gulf War syndrome is outdated in light of "a complete sea change in the United States".

== Advocacy for chronic fatigue syndrome ==
In 2002, The Guardian reported on the conflict over the nature of chronic fatigue syndrome/myalgic encephalomyelitis, and whether there is an ongoing pathological process in the illness, contrasting advocates of a biological basis, such as Professors Hooper, Kenny de Meirleir and Anthony Komaroff, with advocates of a psychosocial basis, such as Professor Simon Wessely. The article stated that the absence of any mention of the physical basis of CFS in a 2002 report to the CMO on the illness prompted Hooper to publish a dissent on the internet. In the Guardian article, Hooper states there is an increasing volume of scientific literature that shows extensive change and injury to the neuro-endocrine-immune systems of patients. He also described biochemical dysfunction, and physiological changes in the bodies of some patients.

He is the medical advisor for The Grace Charity for ME.

== Aerotoxic Association Scientific Advisor ==
Hooper is the Aerotoxic Association Scientific Advisor. In a presentation to the UK Parliament in 2007, he stated his concern that the responsible authorities are using “obfuscation, deception and even downright lying” by trying to sustain the theory that Aerotoxic Syndrome is psychological in nature rather than neurological as a result of exposures to toxic aircraft cabin air.

== Autism ==
Hooper sits on the board of ESPA (Education and Services for People with Autism), a charity providing services for people with autism spectrum conditions. He is also one of the directors of the not-for-profit subsidiary, ESPA Research, conducting various investigations into a possible biological basis for autism and related conditions.

== Selected bibliography ==
- Hooper M (May 2007). "Myalgic encephalomyelitis: a review with emphasis on key findings in biomedical research". J. Clin. Pathol. 60 (5): 466–71. doi:10.1136/jcp.2006.042408. PMC 1994528. PMID 16935967.
- Hooper M (December 2011). "Workshop summary and conclusions: human sacrifice—road speed—responsibility—economics". J. Biol. Phys. Chem. 11 (4): 209–15. doi:10.4024/25HO11A.jbpc.11.04.
- Byron Hyde, Malcolm Hooper (2010). "Missed Diagnoses: Myalgic Encephalomyelitis & Chronic Fatigue Syndrome". Lulu. ISBN 9780557325177.
