= Siri Thoresen =

Norwegian psychologist

Siri Thoresen (born 1 September 1962) is a Norwegian psychologist and an expert on military psychology. She is a Research Professor at the Norwegian Centre for Violence and Traumatic Stress Studies. Her research focuses on psychological trauma as a result of war, catastrophe and terrorism, including psychological trauma in military personnel, and on sexual abuse.

She became a licensed clinical psychologist in 1990 and obtained a dr.psychol. (PhD) degree at the University of Oslo in 2006. She worked as head of the Psychological Centre in Tuzla, Bosnia-Hercegovina in 1994. She then worked as a clinical psychologist at the Stress Management Team for International Military Operations at the Norwegian Armed Forces Joint Medical Centre. In 2005 she became a senior researcher at the Norwegian Centre for Violence and Traumatic Stress Studies, and in 2016 she was promoted to research professor.
