= Trond Heir =

Norwegian psychiatrist and military physician

Trond Heir (born 5 December 1958) is a Norwegian psychiatrist and military physician. He is a Research Professor at the Norwegian Centre for Violence and Traumatic Stress Studies and Professor II of Psychiatry at the University of Oslo Institute of Clinical Medicine. He is an expert on psychotraumatology, epidemiology and public health. He was a member of the crisis team in the aftermath of the 2011 Norway attacks against a youth camp at Utøya and against the central government departments, and has carried out research on psychological trauma in the aftermath of the attacks.

He graduated with the cand.med. degree in 1986 and with the dr.scient. degree in 1999, with a dissertation in the field of military medicine.
