= Espeseth =

Espeseth may refer to:

- Espeseth (surname), a Norwegian surname
- Espeseth Cove, a hamlet in Saskatchewan, Canada
- 34042 Espeseth, an asteroid
