= Mossige (surname) =

Mossige is a surname. Notable people with the surname include:

- Erling Mossige (1907–1997), Norwegian jurist and banker
- Svein Mossige (born 1949), Norwegian psychologist
