= The Anna Phillips Foundation =

Mental health charity

- Abbreviation: APF
- Formation: 2019
- Legal status: Charity
- Purpose: Supporting individuals with trauma-related mental illness
- Headquarters: Swansea, Wales
- Founder: David Phillips
- Website: https://annaphillips.org

The Anna Phillips Foundation is a mental health charity in England and Wales. The charity aims to promote the wellbeing of individuals suffering from trauma-related mental illness, primarily through facilitating a variety of activities in nature.

The Anna Phillips Foundation collaborates with researchers specializing in traumatic stress to develop research into how the natural world can help individuals recover from their trauma and associated mental health challenges. The foundation also campaigns to enhance public awareness and understanding of environmental factors contributing to self-harm and suicide.

== History ==
Following the death of his daughter, Anna Phillips, in June 2015, David Phillips founded the Anna Phillips Foundation in 2019. The foundation was set up in Anna's memory to support people with trauma-related mental health challenges through organized nature-based activities.

== Focus ==
The Anna Phillips Foundation operates within three main areas of focus:

Organizing outdoor activities

Individuals are referred by their counsellor, therapist or medical practitioner for outdoor activities. Shared decision-making plays a key role in the process; clients actively participate in deciding which activities are achievable and within their window of tolerance.

Research collaboration for trauma recovery

The foundation collaborates with researchers to advance the understanding of how nature-based activities can aid recovery from trauma. This includes people who have been diagnosed with post-traumatic stress disorder (PTSD), complex post-traumatic stress disorder (cPTSD), or those displaying symptoms of trauma. The research also covers individuals displaying early symptoms of psychosis, prolonged grief disorder and those struggling with the effects of bereavement.

Enhancing public awareness and understanding

The Anna Phillips Foundation works to achieve a greater public awareness and understanding of the societal causes of self-harm, suicide and mental illness.

== Partnerships ==
The foundation has developed partnerships with organisations to provide non-medical solutions for individuals recovering from trauma-related mental health challenges. Notable partners include WCVA, the Betsi Cadwaladr University Health Board and Bangor University.
