= Adult Sexual Interest in Children =

- Editor: Mark Cook and Kevin Howells
- Language: English
- Publisher: Academic Press
- Publication date: 1981
- Publication place: United Kingdom
- Pages: 275
- ISBN: 9780121872502

Adult Sexual Interest in Children is a book edited by Mark Cook and Kevin Howells, it was published by Academic Press in 1981. The book has nine chapters written by Johann W. Mohr, Thore Langfeldt, Kurt Freund, Howells, Ken Plummer, Donald J. West and Matti Virkkunen, among others.
