= Inger-Lise Lien =

Norwegian social anthropologist

Inger-Lise Lien (born 1954) is a Norwegian social anthropologist. She is a Research Professor at the Norwegian Centre for Violence and Traumatic Stress Studies. She is an expert on genital mutilation, criminal gangs, illegal drug trade, racism, migration and social integration of immigrants, and Pakistan.

Lien obtained a dr.polit. (PhD) degree in social anthropology with a dissertation on moral and emotions in Punjab, Pakistan in 1993.

== Books ==
- Pathways to Gang Involvement and Drug Distribution, Springer, 2013
- I bakvendtland: Kriminelle liv, Universitetsforlaget, 2011
- Street Gangs, Migration and Ethnicity, Willan Publishing, 2008
- Moral og emosjoner i pakistansk Punjab, 1993
