= Kristin Skjørten =

- Born: 10 September 1958 (age 68)
- Occupation: Criminologist

Academic background
- Thesis: Voldsbilder i hverdagen – om menns forståelser av kvinnemishandling (1993)
- Doctoral advisor: Nils Christie

Kristin Skjørten (born 10 September 1958) is a Norwegian criminologist. She is a research professor at the Norwegian Centre for Violence and Traumatic Stress Studies (NKVTS) and a professor II of the sociology of law at the University of Oslo Department of Public and International Law. Skjørten is an expert on violence and abuse in close relationships, child custody, the Convention on the Rights of the Child and children's rights.

== Career ==
She obtained a mag.art. degree in criminology from the University of Oslo (1986), with the dissertation Når makt blir vold – en analyse av seksualisert vold i parforhold on sexualized violence among spouses, and a doctoral degree in criminology from 1993, with the dissertation Voldsbilder i hverdagen – om menns forståelser av kvinnemishandling on men's understanding of violence against women. The dissertation was published as a book in 1994. Her doctoral advisor was Nils Christie.

She was a researcher at the Department of Criminology and Criminal Law at the University of Oslo Faculty of Law from 1985 to 2000. She worked at the Norwegian Resource Centre for Information and Studies on Violence from 2000 to 2002 and as a senior researcher at the Norwegian Institute for Social Research from 2002 to 2008. In 2009 she was appointed as research professor and head of section for violence and trauma – children and youth at the Norwegian Centre for Violence and Traumatic Stress Studies (NKVTS) and as professor II (a part-time full professorship) of the sociology of law at the University of Oslo Department of Public and International Law.

In 2007 she was co-editor of the book Bjørnen sover – om vold i familien on domestic violence, together with then-Minister of Justice Knut Storberget.
