= DYB (disambiguation) =

DYB or Dyb may refer to:

- Dalian Young Boy F.C., a Chinese association football club
- Grete Dyb, a Norwegian psychiatrist and terrorism researcher
- ISO 639:dyb, the ISO 639 code for the Jabirr Jabirr language
- Summerville Airport, the FAA LID code DYB

== See also ==
- Dyb dyb dyb
