= Jon-Håkon Schultz =

Jon-Håkon Schultz (born 28 March 1968) is a Norwegian educational psychologist and researcher on violence, terrorism and crisis psychology. He is a Research Professor at the Norwegian Centre for Violence and Traumatic Stress Studies and Professor of Educational Psychology at the University of Tromsø.

He is an expert on crisis psychology, particularly relating to children and youth. In collaboration with the Norwegian Refugee Council, Schultz developed the Better Learning Programme, a psychosocial school initiative designed to assist children impacted by stress and trauma from war and displacement. Through this programme, many displaced children, including those in Gaza, have exhibited marked reductions in post-traumatic nightmares and improved academic outcomes. His research further underscores the compounded challenges these children face, especially during global crises like the COVID-19 pandemic.

In 2023, Schultz's work with refugee children overcoming trauma-induced nightmares was the subject of the documentary film Reclaiming the Night, directed by British filmmaker and war correspondent Daniel Benjamin Wheeler.

Schultz's expertise also extends to the impact of the 2011 Norway attacks, on former child soldiers, and on child sexual abuse. He has published several books, and is also a frequent media commentator in these fields in Norway. He has his cand.paed.spec. degree (1996) and his dr.polit. (PhD) degree (2006), both in special needs education, from the University of Oslo. Jon-Håkon Schultz has been Vice President of UNICEF Norway.
