= Tine Jensen =

Norwegian psychologist

Tine Kristin Jensen is a Norwegian psychologist. She is a Professor of Psychology at the University of Oslo and a Research Professor at the Norwegian Centre for Violence and Traumatic Stress Studies. Jensen is an expert on children and psychological trauma, developmental psychology, and treatment studies. Her research has focused on e.g. sexually abused children, how Norwegian parents and children coped with the 2004 Indian Ocean earthquake and tsunami, adolescents who survived the Utøya massacre and their families, young unaccompanied asylum seekers and treatment of traumatized children.
