= Arne Sund =

Norwegian military psychiatrist

- Born: 14 August 1925
- Died: 4 December 2011 (aged 86)
- Scientific career
- Fields: Military psychiatry
- Institutions: University of Oslo
- Military career
- Service: Medical Service
- Rank: Lieutenant-colonel

Arne Sund (born 14 August 1925, died 4 December 2011) was a Norwegian military psychiatrist. He "established Norwegian military psychiatry as leading within NATO" and is regarded as the "founder of the research field of disaster psychiatry."

== Career ==
Sund was a member of the Milorg resistance organization during the Second World War. In 1950 he graduated as a medical doctor at the University of Oslo and he served as a military doctor in the Independent Norwegian Brigade Group in Germany and with the Norwegian Mobile Army Surgical Hospital (NORMASH) during the Korean War in 1952. He became a captain of the Norwegian Armed Forces medical service in 1955 and a lieutenant-colonel and chief psychiatrist in 1967. His own experiences from several war and conflict areas, both with stress reactions among soldiers and with the suffering of the civilian population, had great influence on his later work as a psychiatrist. He "established Norwegian military psychiatry as leading within NATO" from the 1960s. Through Sund's efforts Norway became "an international pioneer in the research on mass killings, war, catastrophes, accidents and all forms of violence."

In 1978 he was appointed as Professor of Disaster Psychiatry at the University of Oslo and the founding director of the Division of Disaster Psychiatry, a joint unit of the University of Oslo Faculty of Medicine and the Norwegian Armed Forces medical service. His chair was the first worldwide in the emerging field of disaster psychiatry. He retired in 1984 and was succeeded by his student Lars Weisæth who further developed the research field.

== Bibliography ==
- Historien om katastrofepsykiatrien som nytt fagområde i Norge (2008).
