= Siri Leknes =

Norwegian neuroscientist

Siri Graff Leknes is a Norwegian neuroscientist and Professor (Chair) of Neuroscience at the University of Oslo, where she directs the Leknes Affective Brain Lab, which is funded by a European Research Council grant.

She earned her Ph.D. in neuroscience at the University of Oxford in 2008 with the dissertation Pain, Pleasure and Relief. After postdoctoral fellowships in Gothenburg and Oslo, she joined Oslo University Hospital as a senior researcher. In 2014 she was appointed full Professor of Neuroscience at the University of Oslo.

According to Google Scholar, she has been cited over 2,000 times in scientific literature.
