= Reclaiming the Night =

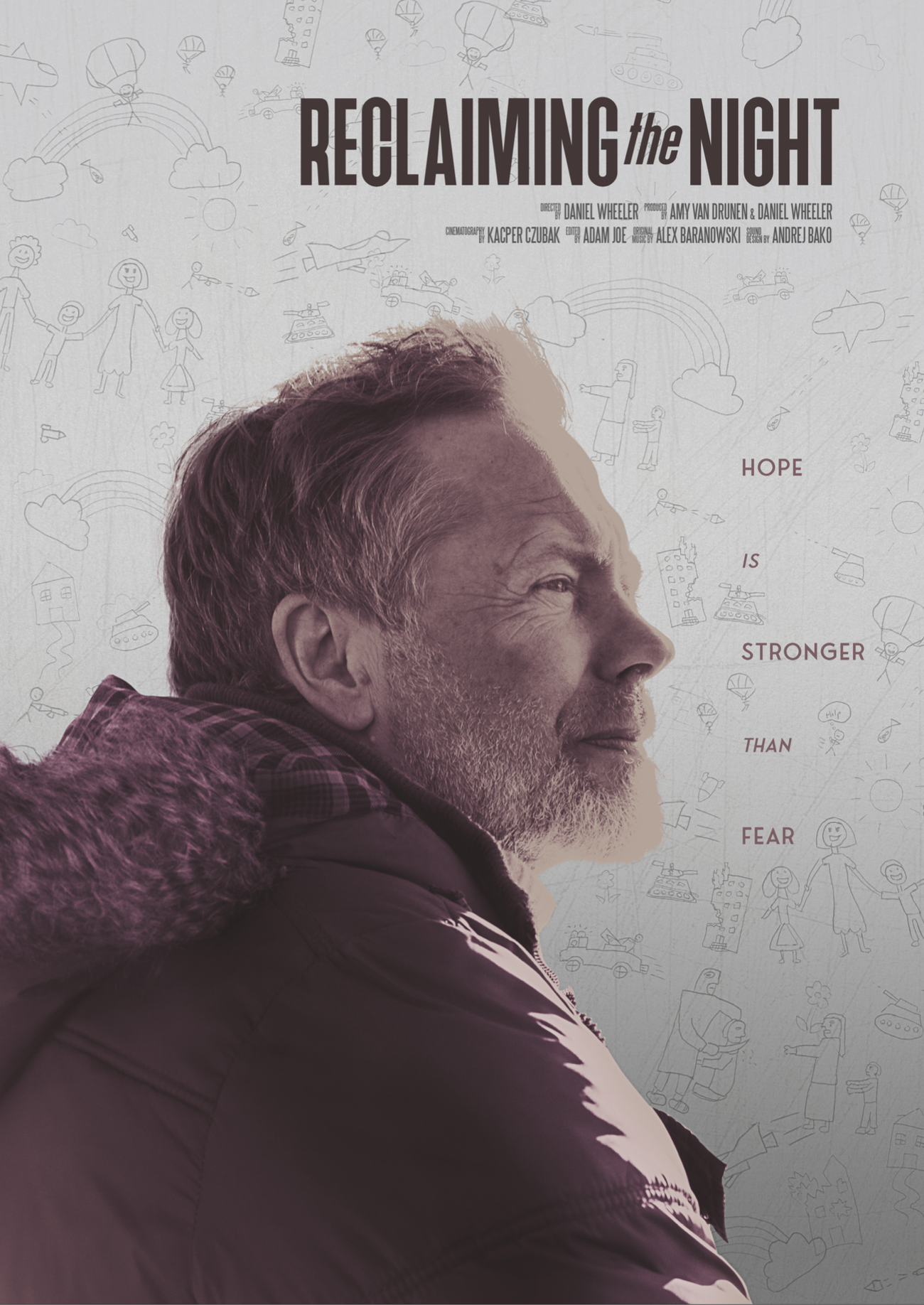
- Official film poster
- Directed by: Daniel Benjamin Wheeler
- Produced by: Daniel Benjamin Wheeler; Amy Van Drunen
- Cinematography: Kacper Czubak
- Edited by: Adam Joe
- Music by: Alex Baranowski
- Distributed by: Aeon
- Release date: 18 November 2023; (United Kingdom)
- Country: United Kingdom
- Language: English

Reclaiming the Night is a 2023 documentary film directed by British filmmaker and war reporter Daniel Benjamin Wheeler. The film chronicles Norwegian psychologist Jon-Håkon Schultz’s pioneering work in addressing the trauma-induced nightmares of war-affected children through the Better Learning Programme, developed in partnership with the Norwegian Refugee Council.

Distributed by Aeon and Psyche.co, Reclaiming the Night premiered on 18 November 2023 at the Sheffield Global Cinema Festival, United Kingdom, before its international online release on 7 June 2024. The film has been praised for its emotional resonance, visual style, and humanitarian focus. It won multiple awards, including Best Short Film at the Go Mental! International Film Festival, Best Documentary Short and Best Director at the Los Angeles Independent Film Festival Awards, Best Documentary at the Top Shorts Film Festival, and Best Director at the New York International Film Awards.

Reclaiming the Night was also featured in the 2024 UK Documentaries Catalogue, published by the British Council, which highlights a selection of notable UK-produced documentaries from 2023 and 2024.
