= Inger Elise Birkeland =

Norwegian politician

Director of the Norwegian Centre for Violence and Traumatic Stress Studies
- Incumbent
- Assumed office 2005

Personal details
- Born: 1954 (age 71–72)
- Party: Labour Party

Inger Elise Birkeland (born 1954 in Årdal Municipality) is a Norwegian civil servant and Labour Party politician. Since 2005 she has served as Director of the Norwegian Centre for Violence and Traumatic Stress Studies, a government-owned research institute. She was a political adviser to Prime Minister Gro Harlem Brundtland in the Prime Minister's Office from 1992 to 1996. She was also a member of the Oslo city council from 1992 to 1996. She worked as a civil servant at the Norwegian Directorate of Health from 1978 to 1983, at the Royal Ministry of Health from 1997 to 1998 and as a consultant at IBM Global Services from 1998 to 2005.
