= Svein Bjerke =

Norwegian anthropologist

Svein Bjerke (born 15 November 1938 in Oslo), is a religious historian and professor emeritus at the University of Oslo, where he was attached to the department for the History of Religion for thirty years, part of the time as its head. He belonged to the first Norwegian group of anthropology students, but has since worked with archeological excavations (for example as member of The Scandinavian Joint Expedition to Sudanese Nubia in 1965–66), philological text analyses (especially in his thesis on the Egyptian mouth opening ritual) and traditional anthropological field work. His most well-known work is the doctoral dissertation Religion and Misfortune (UiO 1975; Universitetsforlaget 1981; ISBN 82-00-05681-3) based on fieldwork in North-Western Tanzania. Bjerke has represented Norwegian Comparative religion in the International Association for the History of Religion (IAHR) and for a number of years been a member of the editorial board of the journal Humanist.

Bjerke is married to professor Nora Ahlberg.
