= Edvard Hauff =

Norwegian psychiatrist

Edvard Hauff (born 1948) is a Norwegian psychiatrist and professor emeritus of Psychiatry at the University of Oslo. He is known for his research on psychological trauma, forced migration, immigrants' mental health and global mental health. He spent several years in Cambodia and is credited with building a psychiatric health service in the country.

Hauff was Director of the Psychosocial Team for Refugees in the Directorate of Health from 1986 to 1990 and later Director of its successor institution, the Psychosocial Centre for Refugees at the University of Oslo, from 2002 to 2004, when the institution was merged with three other institutions to become the Norwegian Centre for Violence and Traumatic Stress Studies. He was Director of the Institute of Psychiatry at the University of Oslo from 2004 to 2009.

In 2008 he received the Fangenes Testamente peace prize.
