= Simon Wessely =

British psychiatrist (born 1956)

Sir Simon Wessely GBE FMedSci FRS
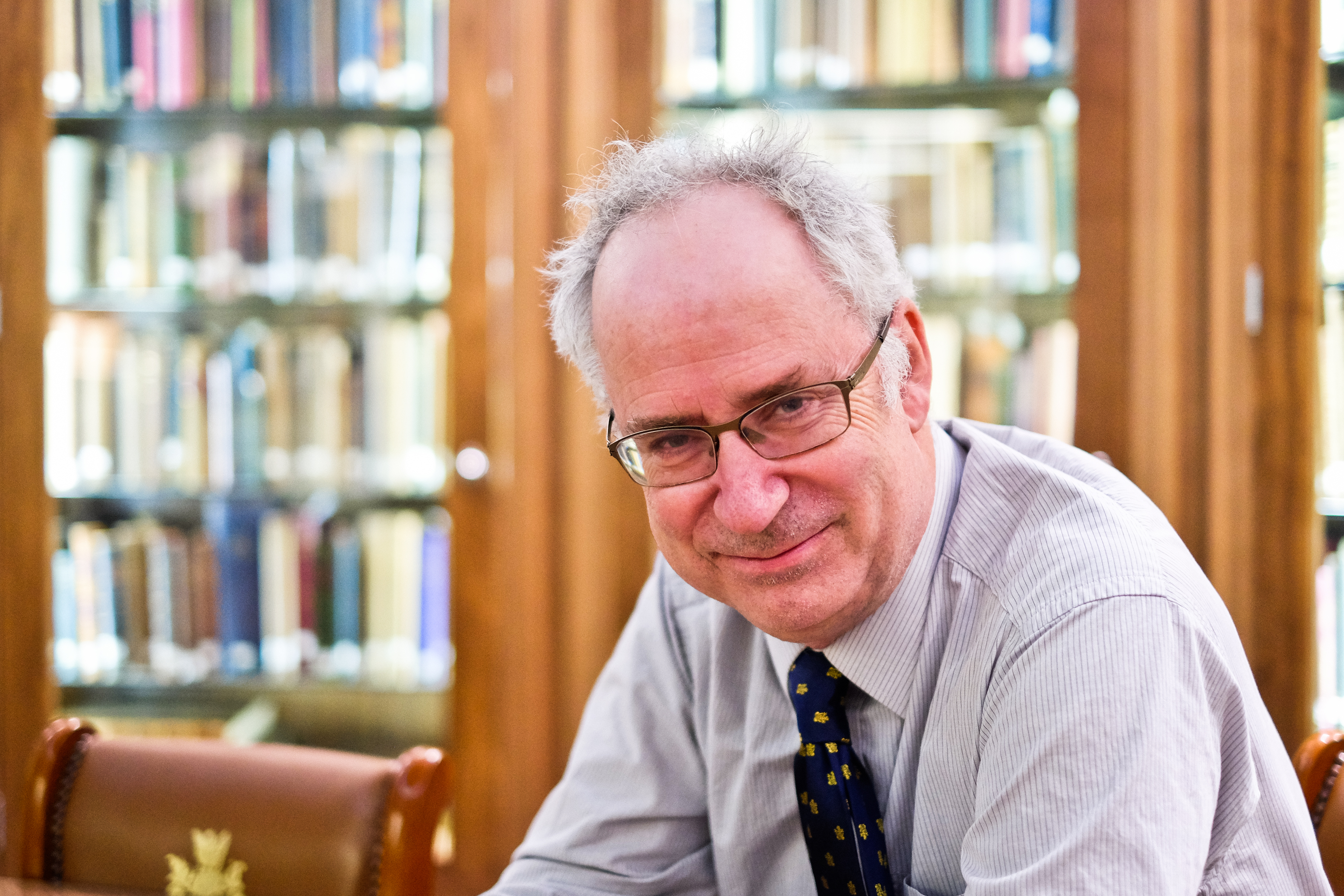
- Simon Wessely in 2016
- Born: Simon Charles Wessely; December 1956 (age 69); Sheffield, West Riding of Yorkshire, England
- Education: King Edward VII School; Trinity Hall, Cambridge; University College, Oxford; London School of Hygiene and Tropical Medicine
- Years active: 1978–present
- Spouse: Clare Gerada
- Medical career
- Profession: Regius Professor; Psychiatrist
- Institutions: King's College London
- Research: Chronic fatigue syndrome, Gulf War syndrome, Military psychiatry
- Awards: John Maddox Prize; Jean Hunter Prize; Knight Bachelor

Sir Simon Charles Wessely GBE FMedSci FRS (born 23 December 1956) is a British psychiatrist. He is Regius Professor of Psychiatry at the Institute of Psychiatry, King's College London and head of its department of psychological medicine, vice dean for academic psychiatry, teaching and training at the Institute of Psychiatry, as well as Director of the King's Centre for Military Health Research. He is also honorary consultant psychiatrist at King's College Hospital and the Maudsley Hospital, as well as civilian consultant advisor in psychiatry to the British Army. He was knighted in the 2013 New Year Honours for services to military healthcare and to psychological medicine. From 2014 to 2017, he was the elected president of the Royal College of Psychiatrists and then became the first psychiatrist to be elected as President of the Royal Society of Medicine in 200 years.

He became Britain's first and only Regius Professor of Psychiatry in 2018, and joined the board of NHS England in 2023.

== Training ==
After attending King Edward VII School in Sheffield from 1968 to 1975, Wessely studied at Trinity Hall, Cambridge (BA 1978), University College, Oxford (BM BCh 1981), and the London School of Hygiene and Tropical Medicine (MSc 1989). In 1993, the University of London conferred upon him the degree of Doctor of Medicine.

Wessely completed a medical rotation in Newcastle. After attaining medical membership, he studied psychiatry (his primary interest) at the Maudsley in 1984. His 1993 doctoral thesis was on the relationship between crime and schizophrenia. Post-doctoral studies included a year at the National Hospital for Neurology and Neurosurgery and a year studying epidemiology at the London School of Hygiene and Tropical Medicine. In 1999, he was elected fellow of the UK Academy of Medical Sciences (FMedSci).

== Research ==
Wessely's main research interests lie in the "grey areas" between medicine and psychiatry, clinical epidemiology, and military health. His first paper was titled "Dementia and Mrs. Thatcher". Since then, he has published more than 900 papers. His first interest was in medically unexplained symptoms and syndromes, most often about chronic fatigue syndrome, including its aetiology, history, psychology, immunology, sociology, epidemiology and treatment. Later, he moved into military health, publishing on numerous areas including combat stress, post traumatic stress, mental health screening, tour length, shell shock, Gulf War syndrome, Forces Health Protection, veterans' mental and physical health, substance misuse, stigma, impact of deployment, families, children of military families, reservists, cohesion and morale, concussion and head injury, combat motivation, peer support, moral injury, peacekeeping, violence, women in combat roles, and military history.

Other interests include epidemiology, medicine and law, history of psychiatry, chronic pain, somatisation, chemical and biological terrorism and deliberate self-harm.

He has more than 1000 papers with an H index of 153 and his work has been cited in more than 118,000 scientific papers (April 2023) In 2021, he became a "Highly Cited Researcher", putting him in the top 0.1% of science and social science researchers.

== Work on chronic fatigue syndrome ==
In the first years after the introduction of the diagnosis chronic fatigue syndrome, the condition was often mocked in the media, for example being described as "yuppie flu". Wessely and his co-workers verified that this stereotype was inaccurate, substantiating an association between autonomic dysfunction and chronic fatigue syndrome and providing reliable data on the prevalence of CFS in the community, showing that it has become an important public health issue. Other work on CFS included the development of new measurement tools, establishing the lack of relationship between hyperventilation and CFS, discovery of an endocrine "signature" for CFS that differed from depression and that prior depressive illnesses were likely linked to the condition in some cases.

Wessely and his colleagues, using randomised controlled trials and follow-up studies, developed a rehabilitation strategy for patients that involved cognitive behavioural and graded exercise therapy, which was claimed to be effective in reducing symptoms of CFS (a condition that otherwise lacks a cure or unequivocally successful treatment) in ambulant (non-severely affected) patients. Other studies looked at the professional and popular views of CFS, neuropsychological impairment in CFS, and cytokine activation in the illness. Some of his other written work includes a history of CFS, numerous reviews, and co-authoring the 1998 book Chronic fatigue and its syndromes.

Wessely believes that CFS generally has some organic trigger, such as a virus, but that the role of psychological and social factors are more important in perpetuating the illness, otherwise known as the "cognitive behavioural model" of CFS, and that treatments centred around these factors can be effective. He describes the cognitive behavioural model as follows: "According to the model the symptoms and disability of CFS are perpetuated predominantly by dysfunctional illness beliefs and coping behaviours. These beliefs and behaviours interact with the patient's emotional and physiological state and interpersonal situation to form self-perpetuating vicious circles of fatigue and disability... The patient is encouraged to think of the illness as 'real but reversible by his or her own efforts' rather than (as many patients do) as a fixed unalterable disease". A 2019 review found that the cognitive behavioral model of CFS underpinning the promotion of CBT lacks high-quality evidential support and that "There is little scientific credibility in the claim that psycho-behavioural therapies are a primary treatment for this illness."

In 2009, a paper was published in Science stating that the XMRV virus was found in two-thirds of CFS patients. Wessely collaborated with experts in retrovirology at Imperial College London, sharing with them stored DNA samples from the King's CFS unit, and providing the first proof that XMRV was not the cause of CFS/ME. Wessely also said that this research fails to model the role that childhood abuse, psychological factors, and other infections may play in the illness. The Science paper was retracted but not before there was intense criticism of the King's/Imperial failure to replicate, claiming that the patients seen at King's did not have CFS/ME. The team responded showing this to be unfair.

=== Opposition and criticism ===
In an interview published by The Lancet, Wessely discusses the controversy relating to his work on Gulf War syndrome and chronic fatigue syndrome. He stated that, in hindsight, he was keen to get published and could have been more diplomatic and admits he is now better at handling controversy. He has been described as both "the most hated doctor in Britain" and "one of the most respected psychiatrists working in Britain today".

Malcolm Hooper, the Countess of Mar, and others have strongly criticised Wessely including specific allegations that he said are myths. In a 2002 article on chronic fatigue syndrome, The Guardian characterised the criticisms of one group of patients as a "vendetta". Wessely has repeatedly stated he has been the subject of numerous threats and personal attacks, and that "militants" have even made threats to his life. "It is a relentless, vicious, vile campaign designed to hurt and intimidate... For some years now, all my mail has been X-rayed. I have speed dial phones and panic buttons at police request and receive a regular briefing on my safety and specific threats." Wessely gave up research into CFS around 2001, and as of 2011 his clinical work was with members of the armed forces; he said: "I now go to Iraq and Afghanistan, where I feel a lot safer".

== Military health ==
Wessely's work was the first to show that service in the 1991 Gulf War had had a significant effect on the health of UK servicemen and women. Their work found an association between both multiple vaccines and vaccines used to protect against biological warfare. His group also confirmed that classic psychiatric injury (PTSD) was not a sufficient explanation for the observed health problems. He and his colleagues in the medical school showed persisting evidence of immune activation, but did not find evidence that exposure to organophosphate agents had caused chronic neurological damage, nor evidence linking depleted uranium to Gulf War Illness. The group also showed that although many veterans, irrespective of service in the 1991 Gulf War, who left the armed forces with persisting mental health problems did seek and receive help for mental health problems, a substantial minority did not.

While this work, Wessely's evidence to the Lloyd Inquiry, and the work of other investigators was crucial in categorising Gulf War syndrome as a verifiable consequence of service in the Gulf, which resulted in affected Gulf War veterans being able to receive war pensions, Wessely does not believe that Gulf War syndrome exists as a distinct illness, stating "Is there a problem? Yes, there is. Is it Gulf War syndrome or isn't it? I think that's a statistical and technical question that's of minor interest." His and many other groups failed to show the existence of a discrete syndrome related to Gulf War service, as a result of which he prefers the term "Gulf War Illnesses" or "Gulf War health effects", which might have at least in part being triggered by stress, specifically soldiers' anxiety about chemical weapons and vaccines, as well as misinformation about Gulf War syndrome.

In 1998, Wessely co-founded the King's Centre for Military Health (KCMHR) with social scientist Professor Christopher Dandeker. Following the 2003 invasion of Iraq, and mindful of the problems that had arisen with Gulf War Illnesses, they began a new long-term study of the possible impact of this new deployment on the health and well-being of UK armed forces deployed to Iraq. This study has continued to the present day, and is the main source of information on the short-, medium- and long-term effects of the deployment to Iraq (Op TELIC and subsequently Afghanistan (Op HERRICK).

Early results showed that there had been no "Iraq War Syndrome", despite the fact that the forces had received similar drugs and vaccinations to protect against chemical and biological warfare. Improvements in record-keeping now showed that both anthrax and multiple vaccinations were not associated with medium- or long-term ill health. KCMHR did not find an early and anticipated "tidal wave" or "tsumani" of PTSD in regulars post deployment, but did show that reservists experienced more frequent and prolonged ill health that Regulars. As a consequence of this, the MOD created a new specific mental health programme for reservists. However, by 10 and then 20 years, PTSD rates had increased overall (from 4 to 8%), with the greatest increase in those who had been in direct combat roles, and had now left the Services (15%).

KCMHR has become a leading centres in military health research globally. In two recent citation analyses, Wessely was rated the most published author on military health, with his colleagues Professors Fear and Greenberg in third and fourth place globally.

== President of Royal College of Psychiatrists ==
In 2014, Wessely was elected president of the Royal College of Psychiatrists. He has used his position to argue for better resources for mental health and the treatment of mental disorders and holding the government to account. This included drawing attention to the large disparity between those receiving any form of treatment for physical disorders such as diabetes and those with serious mental health problems, making the case that we can successfully treat many mental health problems, and that patients with disorders do get better. He also argued that there were dangers in pulling out of the European Convention on Human Rights.

As president, he has been a regular media spokesperson such as on BBC current affairs programme Panorama, and that killings by those with mental illness are both unusual and declining. He has argued against making benefits conditional on cooperating with mental health treatments, as subsequently accepted by the Carol Black report and warned psychiatrists against diagnosing Donald Trump.

He has also claimed to oppose lazy or negative stereotypes and images of psychiatry and false dichotomies such as "physical versus mental" or "drugs versus talking" and instead putting forward more positive images. For example, on Any Questions? in August 2014, he opposed the motion proposed by Will Self that psychiatrists were to blame for the current epidemic of mental disorders.

During the junior doctors' dispute, he continued to emphasise support for junior psychiatrists while arguing that the deeper causes of the dispute went beyond pay and hours, comparing junior doctors careers to "being shuffled around the country like lost luggage" and that it is impossible go on increasing demand and expectations with diminishing resources.

Wessely was succeeded as president by Professor Wendy Burn in June 2017.

== Review of the Mental Health Act ==
In October 2017, then Prime Minister Theresa May announced that she had chosen Wessely to conduct a review of the Mental Health Act. He stated in an interview: "Reviewing the act isn't just about changing the legislation. In some ways, that might be the easy part. The bigger challenge is changing the way we deliver care so that people do not need to be detained in the first place. In my experience, it is unusual for a detention to be unnecessary – by the time we get to that stage people are often very unwell, and there seems few other alternatives available." The Labour government elected in 2024 included a mental health bill in their first legislative programme. The bill was passed and received royal assent in December 2025.

== Other interests ==
Wessely also has a long-standing interest in how normal people react to adversity, and what, if any, responses are appropriate. He was a co-author of an influential Cochrane Review showing that the conventional intervention for disaster survivors – to offer immediate psychological debriefing – was not only ineffective, but possibly did more harm than good. Since then, he has published on civilian reactions to the Blitz, and latterly an early study of reactions to the 7 July 2005 London bombings, the Litvinenko affair, and swine flu.

In many venues, he has argued that people are more resilient than we give them credit for, and that the best thing we can do in the immediate aftermath of trauma is to offer practical support and encourage people to turn to their own social networks, such as family, friends, colleagues or family doctor. However, after a few months, when most distress has reduced, then for the minority who are still psychologically distressed or disabled it is appropriate to offer evidence-based psychological interventions.

After the GermanWings tragedy he suggested that we should not jump to conclusions such as banning all pilots from flying who had a history of depression (as opposed to current depression). He argued that the skies would be safer if pilots felt that the best way to be able to continue their careers was by being open and honest about their mental health, and not covering up, which would be the consequence of a lifetime ban. He advised the Civil Aviation Authority with the result that no such ban was instituted, but mental health assessments were improved. He worked with the CAA and BALPA to achieve his proposals.

In September 2011, he was asked by the Norwegian government to join an international review of how they had responded to the atrocities committed by Anders Breivik.

During the 2016 EU referendum, he was one of the leaders of the Healthier IN campaign, making the case for science and health.

He was a member of the Mental Health Taskforce, chaired by Paul Farmer, which led to the Five Year Forward View for Psychiatry.

He was instrumental in setting up the Commission on Acute Psychiatric Care, chaired by Lord Crisp, to investigate the increasing numbers of inappropriate out of area placements – more than 5,000 patients a year being seen and hospitalised outside their local area, sometimes at the other end of the country. The report made recommendations that were incorporated into the Five year Forward View for Mental Health, accepted by NHS England.

He was appointed in 2017 to the Judicial Appointments Commission (JAC) the body that selects candidates for judicial office in England and Wales, and is dedicated to the principal that an independent judiciary is an essential feature of a democratic society. He was reappointed in 2020.

In January 2023, he was appointed as a non- executive director at NHS England.

== Director, Health Protection Research Unit ==
In 2015, he led the bid between King's College London, Newcastle University and the University of East Anglia for a new Health Protection Research Unit (HPRU) in Emergency Preparedness and Response in 201R, becoming its first director and leading it to renewal in 2020, before handing over the directorship to Professor James Rubin in 2022. The unit is funded by the National Institute for Health Research (NIHR) and Public Health England, now the UK Health Security Agency. The unit continued a major theme of Wessely's research into how populations and people react to disaster and adversity, adding the Salisbury Novocok incident public responses to the Salisbury Novichok incident: a cross-sectional survey of anxiety, anger, uncertainty, perceived risk and avoidance behaviour in the local community risk communication, organisational responses to stress, and latterly a large portfolio of research into COVID-19, including psychological impacts of quarantine Coronavirus: The psychological effects of quarantining a city – The BMJ, a Feb 2020 systematic review of the likely impact and how to reduce it, which has been cited over 10,000 times since publication The psychological impact of quarantine and how to reduce it: rapid review of the evidence – The Lancet, work on Pmoral injury and the health of the NHS workforce during the pandemic Managing mental health challenges faced by healthcare workers during COVID-19 pandemic The BMJ, conspiracy theories and Covid, and other aspects of health protection.

== Profiles ==
He has been profiled in the BMJ profile, in which he was described as having a "joking seriousness", as well as The Times, The Lancet, The New Statesman, The Daily Telegraph and others. He has been a guest on Private Passions, The Life Scientific, and on the BBC celebrity radio show Desert Island Discs in March 2021.

== Personal life ==
Wessely's father, Rudi, came to the UK in August 1939, one of the children rescued by Nicholas Winton. Nearly all of Rudi's family members, including his parents, were murdered during the Holocaust. His father was the first of the children to meet Winton nearly 40 years later and both Wessely and his father were present in the audience of the 1988 That's Life! episode when Winton met many of the children he had saved and their families, a scene reproduced in the 2023 feature film One Life. He has spoken passionately about issues affecting refugees, and supporting Alf Dubs's legislation. He spoke at several of the commemorations for the 80th anniversary of the start of the Kindertransports.

Wessely is married to Clare Gerada; they have two sons. His interests include skiing and history, and he cycled annually from London to Paris between 2006 and 2012, to raise money for veterans' charities.

== Publications ==
Wessely has co-authored books on CFS, psychological reactions to terrorism, randomised controlled trials, and a history of military psychiatry, From Shell Shock to PTSD.

== Honours ==
For his work on CFS, Wessely was awarded the Jean Hunter Prize in 1997 by the Royal College of Physicians and was co-winner of the John Maddox Prize 2012 sponsored by Nature and the Ralph Kohn Foundation, and organised by Sense about Science on whose advisory council he serves. The award is given to individuals who have promoted sound science and evidence on a matter of public interest, with an emphasis on those who have faced extreme difficulty or opposition in doing so, as Wessely has done in researching neuropsychiatric elements to CFS despite alleged threats to his life. Some, however, have objected to this award being given to him due to concerns over the quality of his research.

To balance these criticisms academic supporters would point out that he was appointed as a Foundation Senior Investigator of the National Institute for Health and Care Research (NIHR), which is given on very strict criteria including analysis of metrics/citations. The college of NIHR Senior Investigators is drawn from the most pre-eminent NIHR-funded researchers selected through annual competitions. He was also elected Fellow of the Academy of Medical Sciences (FMedSci), the medical equivalent of the Royal Society, in 1999. Only 40 are honoured per year, and it is the highest honour and professional recognition in UK academic medical science.

Wessely was knighted by Queen Elizabeth II "for services to military healthcare and to psychological medicine" in the 2013 New Year Honours.

In 2014, Wessely was elected President of the Royal College of Psychiatrists. He announced his priorities to include parity between physical and mental health, improving the image of psychiatry and psychiatrists, improving recruitment into the specialism, and ensuring excellence in education and training.

He was named in the Health Service Journal Top 100 Clinicians in 2014 and 2015. He was also listed in Debrett's Top 500 as one of the seven most influential doctors in the country.

In 2013, Wessely led the successful bid to the National Institute for Health Research to establish a Health Protection Research Unit (HPRU) for Emergency Preparedness and Response which he now chairs.

Also in 2013, he became one of the first men in 100 years to be awarded Honorary Fellowship of the Medical Women's Federation (MWF) for work on issues "of practical relevance to the lives and careers of women in medicine".

In July 2017, Wessely became the first psychiatrist to be elected as President of the Royal Society of Medicine.

In February 2017, he was appointed Regius Professor of Psychiatry at King's College London, the first Regius Chair at KCL and the first in psychiatry anywhere in the United Kingdom.

On 26 June 2019, Wessely was awarded an honorary doctorate of science by the University of Oxford.

On 6 May 2021, he was elected a Fellow of the Royal Society (FRS), becoming only the fourth psychiatrist since Freud to receive this distinction, the highest in UK science.

In 2024, Wessely became a Freeman of the City of London.

In the 2025 Birthday Honours, he was appointed a Knight Grand Cross of the Order of the British Empire (GBE) by King Charles III "for services to mental health".

Professional and academic associations
Preceded by Susan Bailey	President of the Royal College of Psychiatrists; 2014 to 2017	Succeeded by Wendy Burn
