= Solveig Bergman =

Finnish sociologist

Solveig Bergman (born 1955) is a Finnish sociologist who in 2003 was appointed director of the Nordic Gender Institute (NIKK) in Oslo. A researcher at Åbo Akademi University, she earned a doctorate in 2002 with a thesis on feminist movements in Finland and West German. Active in feminist organizations, she has taken part in European Union initiatives including the European Platform of Women Scientists (EPWS). Noe a researcher at Norwegian Centre for Violence and Traumatic Stress Studies, since 2023 she has coordinated a European Economic Area (EEA) research project on women violence shelters in Norway and Slovakia.

== Early life and education ==
Born in Finland in 1955, Solveig Bergman studied sociology at the Åbo Akademi University, first receiving a master's degree. In 1992, she earned a doctorate with the thesis The Politics of Feminism: Autonomous Feminist Movements in Finland and West Germany from the 1960s to the 1980s.

== Career ==
From the 1980s, in addition to teaching, Bergman carried out women's studies research at the Åbo Akamemi in Finland and in the Nordic countries. In 2003 she was appointed director of the Nordic Gender Institute (NIKK) in Oslo. In 2008, she participated in the first meeting of the European Union's "European Platform of Women Scientists" initiative where she supported collaboration between Nordic experience under the NIKK, as well as the Helsinki women in research group, and the work accomplished by the EU's Women and Science department. More recently, as a senior researcher at the
