= Grete Dyb =

Norwegian psychiatrist and terrorism researcher

Grete Anita Dyb (born 23 April 1959) is a Norwegian psychiatrist and terrorism researcher. She is a research professor at the Norwegian Centre for Violence and Traumatic Stress Studies and a professor in child and adolescent psychiatry at the University of Oslo Institute of Clinical Medicine. She has carried out research on psychological trauma and been involved in clinical work with children and adolescents exposed to sexual abuse, violence and disasters, and has in recent years directed a research project on the effects of the 2011 Norway attacks. She is President of the International Society for Traumatic Stress Studies (2015–2016).

Academic offices
Preceded by Miranda Olff	President of the International Society for Traumatic Stress Studies; 2015–2016	Succeeded by Meaghan O'Donnell (Elect)
