= Kenny de Meirleir =

Belgian physioloigst

Kenny de Meirleir is a Belgian medical doctor best known for his work on chronic fatigue syndrome (CFS), including the book Chronic Fatigue Syndrome: A Biological Approach (2002) which he co-edited with Patrick Englebienne. He currently serves as medical director at the Whittemore Peterson Institute in Reno, Nevada.

== Education and career ==
De Meirleir gained his medical degree from the VUB in Brussels in 1977, and completed an internal medicine residency in the Department of Internal Medicine, University Hospital of Vrije Universiteit, Brussels.

He is among the authors of over 92 published scientific articles, most of them related to CFS.

== Controversy ==
=== Legal proceedings ===
In 2009, an investigation was launched into De Meirleir regarding the unauthorized importation of the drug Nexavir, which he intended to use in the treatment of patients with chronic fatigue syndrome. The case did not come to court until nine years later. The court issued a simple guilty verdict (nl:Eenvoudige schuldigverklaring), a ruling under Belgian law where the defendant is found guilty but no sentence is imposed due to excessive delay in prosecution.

=== Financial concerns ===
Ethical concerns have been raised about De Meirleir's financial ties to the companies that sell the tests and treatments he prescribes. Companies like RED Laboratories and Kalida, where his wife was a director, have been linked to these financial interests.

== Publications ==
Books:

- Kenny De Meirleir, Patrick Englebienne, Chronic Fatigue Syndrome: A Biological Approach (2002), ISBN 978-0-849-31046-1
- Kenny De Meirleir, Neil Mcgregor, Pediatric Chronic Fatigue Syndrome (2007), ISBN 978-0-789-03531-8
- Michel Osteaux, Kenny de Meirleir, Magnetic Resonance Imaging and Spectroscopy in Sports Medicine (1991), ISBN 978-3-540-52548-6

Articles:

- Meeusen, Romain, and Kenny De Meirleir. "Exercise and brain neurotransmission." Sports Medicine 20, no. 3 (1995): 160-188.
