= Nils Johan Lavik =

Norwegian psychiatrist

Nils Johan Lavik (10 October 1931 – 31 October 2011) was a Norwegian psychiatrist and Professor of Psychiatry at the University of Oslo. He was known for his work on psychological trauma among refugees.

He graduated as a medical doctor in 1958, became a specialist in psychiatry in 1965 and earned his PhD (dr.med.) at the University of Oslo in 1976. His dissertation compared youth in rural and urban areas. In 1978 he was appointed by the King-in-Council as Professor of Psychiatry at the University of Oslo, and he became Professor Emeritus in 2000. From 1990 to 2000 he was also Director of the Psychosocial Centre for Refugees at the University of Oslo. A Festschrift in his honour was published in 1991.

He received the Lisl and Leo Eitinger Prize in 2009, for "his long-term commitment and work for refugees in Norway" and for his contribution "to enhancing knowledge of and respect for human rights among doctors and medical staff."
