= Nora Ahlberg =

Norwegian psychologist (born 1952)

Nora Louise Ahlberg (born 23 December 1952) is a Norwegian psychologist. She was Professor of Psychology at the University of Oslo and Director of the Psychosocial Centre for Refugees and later Director of the Norwegian Centre for Migration and Minority Health, a government agency that is now part of the Norwegian Institute of Public Health.

== Career ==
Ahlberg is educated both as a clinical psychologist and a historian of religion with her specialisation in anthropology. She also studied psychiatry and sociology. Moreover, she is educated in arts from Fria Målarskolan (1972–1975) in Helsinki.

Ahlberg has been affiliated with several universities in the Nordic countries, including the universities of Oslo (1978-) and Helsinki (1991-). She was professor and director of the Psychosocial Centre for Refugees at the University of Oslo and director of the Norwegian Centre for Migration and Minority Health from 2003 to 2007.

She has also been professor at the universities of Tromsø (1995–96), Trondheim (NTNU, 1996–2003) and Oslo University College (2003–2004), besides two periods of research leave at the University of Oxford. She has experience from the Humanities and Social Sciences as well as the Medical faculties, as head of several interdisciplinary research projects.

She has been active in disseminating minority research to administrative, health- and social subject professionals. Ahlberg is a member of the editorial board of the International Journal of Migration, Health and Social Care and editor of the Norwegian Journal for Migration Research (Norsk Tidsskrift for Migrasjonsforskning).

== Private ==
Ahlberg was born in Helsinki as the daughter of kommerseråd Hugo Wilhelm Ahlberg and Helene Hinnerichsen. In 1978 she moved to Oslo, where she married professor Svein Bjerke and had two children Ernst Hugo (1982) and Mildrid (1986).

== Selected publications ==
- New Challenges - Old Strategies. Themes of variation and conflict among Pakistani Muslims in Norway (1990)
- Ahlberg N. Muslim clients in Health Care and in the Social Services in Scandinavia. Intercultural Relations and Religious Authorities: Muslims in the European Union (eds) van Koningsveld PS & Shadid WA. Leuven 2002: Peeters, 67-86.
- Ahlberg N. Women, Gender and Mental Health: Western Europe. Encyclopedia of Women and Islamic Cultures. Leiden (The Netherlands): Brill Publishers vol 3, 2003.
- Hammad R Syed, Dalgard OS, Akthar H, Dalen I & Ahlberg N. Inequalities of Health: A comparative study of self-reported health between ethnic Norwegians and Pakistanis in Oslo. International Journal for Equity in Health 2006, 1475-9276-5-7.
- Hammad R Syed, Dalgard OS, Dalen I, Akthar H, Claussen B, Selmer R & Ahlberg N. Psychosocial factors and distress: a comparison between ethnic Norwegians and ethnic Pakistanis in Oslo. BMC Public Health 2006, 6:182 doi:10.1186/1471-2458-6-182.
- Ahlberg N. No Five Fingers are Alike. What Kurdish Female Refugees told me in a Therapeutic Setting. Solum forlag 2000; Second ed.: Karnac [Tavistock-series] 2007.

== Biography ==
- Sleeve information at Karnak Books
- Marquis Who's Who in Medicine and Healthcare, 7th ed, 2009-2010.
- Vem och Vad, Schildts 2008.
