= Eivind Ystrøm =

Eivind Ystrøm (born 1978) is a Norwegian psychologist, Professor (Chair) of Personality Psychology at the University of Oslo and Research Professor at the Norwegian Institute of Public Health. His research fields include genetics, substance use and personality, including intergenerational transmission of depression and other mental illnesses. According to Google Scholar, he has been cited over 7,600 times in scientific literature and has an h-index of 48.
