= Nora Sveaass =

Norwegian psychologist

Nora Sveaass PhD
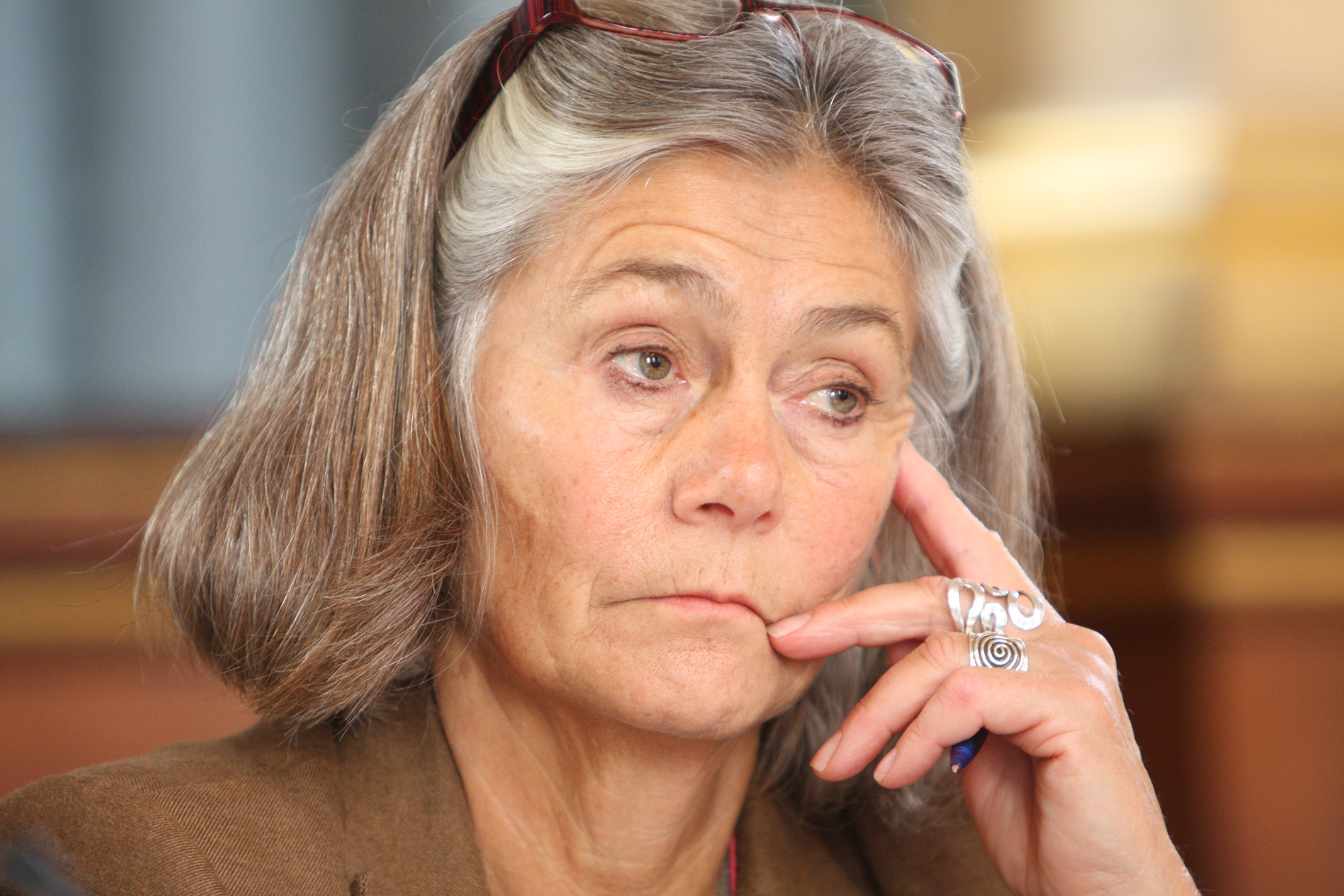
- Nora Sveaass, 2015
- Born: 11 December 1949 (age 76)
- Scientific career
- Fields: Psychology
- Institutions: University of Oslo (Department of Psychology and Norwegian Centre for Violence and Traumatic Stress Studies)

Nora Sveaass (born 11 December 1949) is a Norwegian psychologist, and an expert on refugees, human rights violations, and psychological consequences of torture and violence as well as treatment and rehabilitation of victims of torture and violence. She is Professor of Psychology at the Department of Psychology of the University of Oslo. She served two terms as one of the nine members of the United Nations Committee against Torture from 2005 to 2013, after being nominated as the joint candidate of the governments of the Nordic countries. She did not stand for reelection in 2013; however, in 2015 she was elected as a member of the United Nations Subcommittee on Prevention of Torture, and she is the only member to have served on both committees.

She graduated as a psychologist at the University of Oslo in 1975 and obtained a doctoral degree in 2001. She is a specialist in clinical psychology. She worked as senior psychologist at the Psychosocial Center for Refugees at the University of Oslo from 1986 to 2004, and was a senior researcher and research director for refugee health and forced migration at the Norwegian Centre for Violence and Traumatic Stress Studies from 2004 to 2008. She became an associate professor of psychology at the University of Oslo in 2008, and was later promoted to professor.

== Awards ==
- Honorary member of the Norwegian Psychological Association, 2010
- Human Rights Prize of Amnesty International Norway, 2009
- Bjørn Kristiansen Memorial Award, 1996
- Human Rights Prize of the University of Oslo, 2018
