= Espeseth (surname) =

Espeseth is a Norwegian habitational surname, derived from espe 'aspen' + set 'dwelling farmstead'. Notable people with the name include:

- Arnfinn Espeseth (born 1945), Norwegian footballer
- Gro Espeseth (born 1972), Norwegian footballer and Olympic champion
- Robert Espeseth (born 1953), American rower and Olympic medalist
- Thomas Espeseth (born 1973), Norwegian psychologist and neuroscientist
