= Odd Arne Tjersland =

Norwegian psychologist

Odd Arne Tjersland (born 1947) is a Norwegian psychologist. He is a Professor of Clinical Psychology at the University of Oslo and a Research Professor at the Norwegian Centre for Violence and Traumatic Stress Studies. He is an expert on psychological treatment of children, youth and families, and has published many books and articles on child abuse and violence in close relationships.

He graduated with the cand.psychol. degree at the University of Oslo in 1974, became a specialist in child psychology in 1986 and in clinical family psychology in 1995, and received the dr.philos. degree in psychology in 1993. He became associate professor of psychology at the University of Oslo in 1996 and full professor in clinical psychology in 2002.

== Books ==
- Allianser. Verdier, teorier og metoder i sosialt arbeid. Gyldendal Akademisk, 2010. ISBN 978-82-05-40025-2.
- Våge å leve. En lærebok om alternative veier i behandling basert på erfaringene fra Tyrili. Tano-Aschehoug, 1998. ISBN 82-518-3657-3.
- Samlivsbrudd og foreldreskap. Meklingsprosessens psykologi. Universitetsforlaget, 1992. ISBN 82-00-21567-9.
- Atferdsterapi i Norge. Pax Forlag, 1980. ISBN 82-530-1097-4.
- Atferdsterapi - dressur eller hjelp til selvhjelp. Konsultasjonserfaringer fra familier. Universitetsforlaget, 1977. ISBN 82-00-01675-7.
