= Nexavir =

Clinical data
- Other names: Kutapressin

Legal status
- Legal status: US: Not FDA approved

Identifiers
- CAS Number: 1246936-71-9

Nexavir is an unapproved drug supplied as an injection composed of peptides and amino acids derived from pig liver. It has been marketed to treat skin conditions such as acne, inflammation, and edema. This product has not been found by the FDA to be safe and effective, and the labeling has not been approved by them. Nexavir was formerly known as Kutapressin.
