= Kristine Beate Walhovd =

Norwegian psychologist and neuroscientist

Kristine Beate Walhovd (born 1976) is a Norwegian psychologist, neuroscientist and Professor of Neuropsychology at the University of Oslo. Together with fellow neuroscientist Anders Fjell, she established the Centre of Lifespan Changes in Brain and Cognition at the University of Oslo, which was given the status of "world leading research environment" by the Government of Norway in 2015. She and Anders Fjell shared the Fridtjof Nansen Prize in 2007. She was elected as a member of the Norwegian Academy of Science and Letters in 2011. In 2017 she received a European Research Council consolidator grant. According to Google Scholar, she has been cited over 14,000 times in scientific literature and has an h-index of 67.
