= Anders Fjell =

Norwegian psychologist and neuroscientist

Anders Martin Fjell (born 17 April 1974) is a Norwegian psychologist, neuroscientist and Professor of Cognitive Psychology at the University of Oslo. Together with his wife, fellow neuroscientist Kristine Beate Walhovd, he established the Centre of Lifespan Changes in Brain and Cognition at the University of Oslo, which was given the status of "world leading research environment" by the Government of Norway in 2015. He and his wife shared the Fridtjof Nansen Prize in 2007. He was elected as a member of the Norwegian Academy of Science and Letters in 2017. According to Google Scholar, he has been cited around 14,000 times in scientific literature and has an h-index of 67.
