= Norwegian Armed Forces Joint Medical Services =

The Norwegian Armed Forces Joint Medical Services (Norwegian: Forsvarets sanitet; abbreviated FSAN) is the joint medical services of the Norwegian Armed Forces. It is led by the head of the Joint Medical Services who is a Brigadier-General or Commodore. It is headquartered at Sessvollmoen near Oslo. Norwegian Armed Forces Joint Medical Services was established in London on 7 July 1941 and formed part of the Norwegian High Command. Before 1941 the medical services of the different branches of the military were separate. The history of the medical services of the Norwegian armed forces date back to the 15th century in the case of the navy and the 17th century in the case of the army.
