= Svenn Torgersen =

Norwegian psychologist

Svenn Omar Torgersen (born 24 February 1941) is a Norwegian psychologist.

He was born in Blaker. Torgersen took his dr.philos. degree in 1985, became professor of clinical psychology at the University of Oslo in 1986 and inducted into the Norwegian Academy of Science and Letters; in 1999 he received the Researcher of the Year award at the University of Oslo. His fields of research being psychopathology and personality psychology, he is known for employing twin studies.

He resides in Oslo.
