= NORCE Research =

Norwegian research institute

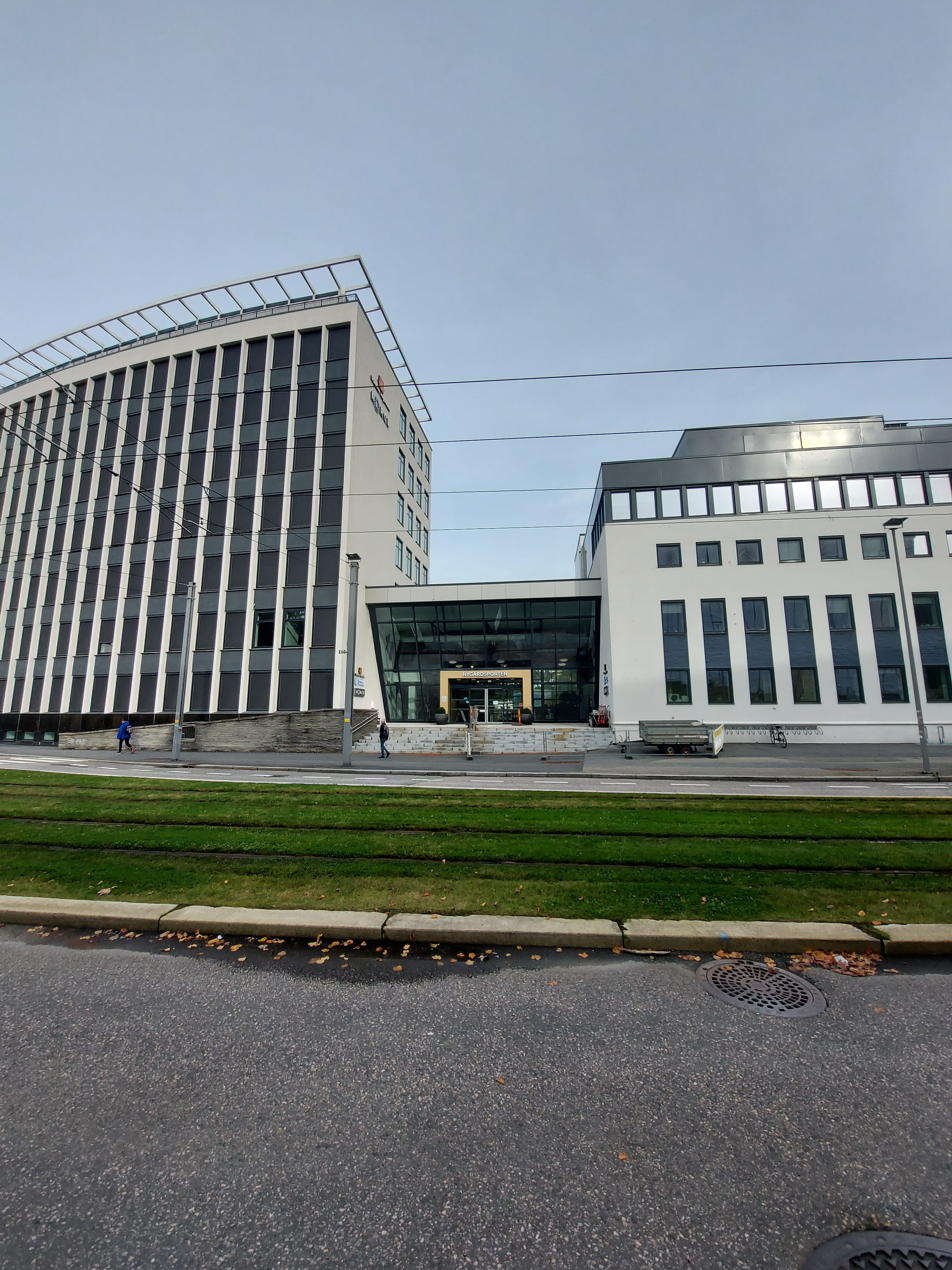
- NORCEs headquarters
- Abbreviation: NORCE
- Formation: 2017
- Type: Government-owned research institute
- Location(s): Oslo, Bergen, Stavanger, Tromsø and other cities
- Fields: Energy, technology, climate science, natural resources, environmental research, health research, social sciences
- CEO: Camilla Stoltenberg
- Parent organization: University of Bergen
- Staff: Ca. 800 (2026)
- Website: www.norceresearch.no

The NORCE Research (NORCE) is a Norwegian government-owned research institute that is majority-owned by the University of Bergen. It is one of the largest research organisations of Norway.

NORCE was founded in 2017 through the merger of several university-owned research institutes and has around 800 employees. At the time of establishment the institute was fully owned by three state universities, the University of Bergen, the University of Stavanger and the University of Agder. A few other shareholders, notably including the University of Tromsø, have joined the consortium. According to the Brønnøysund Register Centre NORCE is a government-owned limited company (Norwegian: statlig eide aksjeselskaper). NORCE includes research institutes that were part of the University of Oslo, the University of Bergen, the University of Tromsø, the University of Stavanger and the University of Agder.

NORCE conducts both basic and applied research and is active in the fields of energy research, technological research, especially maritime technology, climate science, natural resources and environmental research, health research, and the social sciences. The company operates in Oslo, Bergen, Stavanger, Tromsø, Kristiansand, Grimstad, Alta, Bardu, and Svalbard.
