= Military psychiatry =

Psychiatrist specialised in treating soldiers

Military psychiatry covers special aspects of psychiatry and mental disorders within the military context. The aim of military psychiatry is to keep as many serving personnel as possible fit for duty and to treat those disabled by psychiatric conditions. Military psychiatry encompasses counseling individuals and families on a variety of life issues, often from the standpoint of life strategy counseling, as well as counseling for mental health issues, substance abuse prevention and substance abuse treatment; and where called for, medical treatment for biologically based mental illness, among other elements.

A military psychiatrist is a psychiatrist—whether uniformed officer or civilian consultant—specializing in the treatment of military personnel and military family members suffering from mental disorders that occur within the statistical norm for any population, as well as those disorders consequent to warfare and also stresses associated with military life.

== By country ==
=== Norway ===
From the 1960s Arne Sund, the chief psychiatrist of the Norwegian Armed Forces medical service, "established Norwegian military psychiatry as leading within NATO" and became the "founder of the research field of disaster psychiatry," that evolved from military psychiatry.

=== United States ===
==== Active duty members ====
TRICARE is a health program offered to uniformed service members, national guard or reserve members, survivors, former spouses, Medal of Honor recipients, and their families through the United States Department of Defense Military Health System. Upon enrollment, active duty members and their families gain access to emergency and non-emergency mental health care. In the case of a mental health emergency, members are advised to go to the nearest hospital emergency department. There is no requirement for prior authorization. Admissions must be reported to your regional contractor within 24 hours or the next business day. For non-emergency situations, active duty members must receive a referral and prior authorization for all mental health care.

==== Veterans ====
The United States Department of Veteran Affairs offers mental health care to veterans through enrollment in VA health care. Benefits include emergency and non-emergency care. Emergency mental health care is available 24 hours a day, 7 days a week, through VA medical centers and the Veterans Crisis Line. Non-emergency mental health care services provided include inpatient and outpatient care, rehabilitation treatment and residential (live-in) programs, and supported work settings. Conditions treated by the VA:

- Posttraumatic stress disorder (PTSD)
- Depression
- Suicide prevention
- Issues related to military sexual trauma (MST)
- Substance use problems
- Bipolar disease
- Schizophrenia
- Anxiety-related conditions

== Epidemiology ==
Psychiatric disorders have been related to the greatest number of casualties and discharges in several wars. Such conditions typically have somatic manifestations. On-site, emergency psychiatric treatment reduces the prevalence of psychiatric morbidity within the military context.

== Notable military psychiatrists ==
- W. H. R. Rivers (1864–1922)
- Ernst Rüdin (1874–1952)
- Arne Sund (1925–2012)
- Simon Wessely (1956–present)
- Neil Greenberg (1968–present)
- General William C. Menninger
- Nidal Hasan perpetrator of 2009 Fort Hood shooting
- Yagunov George (1997–present)

== See also ==
- Military medicine
- PTSD
