= Thore Langfeldt =

Norwegian psychologist and sexologist

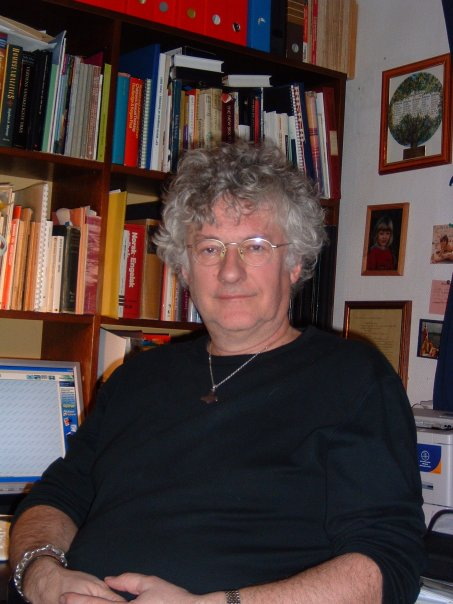
- Born: 30 September 1943; Oslo, Norway
- Occupations: psychologist, sexologist

Thore Langfeldt (born 30 September 1943) is a Norwegian psychologist and sexologist. He was born in Oslo, and is a trained psychologist at the University of Oslo from 1972. He is married and has three children, and is a specialist in clinical psychology and clinical sexology. He has been a practising a psychologist since 1983 and in 1989 he founded the Institute for Clinical Sexology and Therapy which he led until 2004. Together with Elsa Almås took Langfeldt in 1982 initiated the founding of the Norwegian Association for Clinical Sexology. He has also been a senior researcher at the Norwegian Centre for Violence and Traumatic Stress Studies.

He is an internationally known psychologist, among other things, for his work with the child's sexual development, and teaches at several universities in Norway and abroad. He has written books: Sexologi (1993), Barns seksualitet (2000), and Erotikk og fundamentalisme. Fra mesopotamia til kvinnefronten (2005). In the 70 years he was active in paedphilia study group (Pedofil Arbeidsgruppe). A group who made basic field work in this topic. Langfeldt has witnessed in several criminal trials involving sexual assaults. He has been the therapist for Erik Andersen, known as The Pocket Man, and also testified to his defense during the trial in March 2010.
