= Stein Andersson =

Norwegian researcher

Stein Andersson (born 1958) is a Norwegian psychologist, neuroscientist and Professor (Chair) of Clinical and Cognitive Neuropsychology at the University of Oslo, where he also heads the department of cognitive psychology and neuropsychology. He researches clinical and cognitive neuropsychology in patients with different somatic, neurological and neuropsychiatric and psychiatric disorders, including neurocognitive mechanisms in affective disorders.

He earned his cand.psychol. degree at the University of Oslo in 1985, became a specialist in clinical neuropsychology in 1992 and earned his PhD in psychology in 2000. He worked at the Lab for Affective Neuroscience at the University of Wisconsin–Madison 2001–2002 and then became head of neurocognition at Oslo University Hospital in 2003, before joining the University of Oslo in 2012. Since 2010 he has been chairman of the Norwegian Neuropsychiatric Association. According to Google Scholar, he has been cited around 2,000 times in scientific literature and has an h-index of 25.

== Awards ==
He received the Bjørn Christiansen Award in 2008.
