= Svein Mossige =

Norwegian psychologist

Svein Mossige (born 5 December 1949) is a Norwegian psychologist. He is Professor of Psychology at the University of Oslo and is noted for his research on violence against children and child sexual abuse.

== Career ==
He obtained the cand.psychol. degree at the University of Oslo in 1974 and the dr.psychol. degree at the same university in 1998. He formerly worked as a clinical psychologist. From 1996 to 2010, he was a senior researcher, research professor (from 2006) and research director at Norwegian Social Research. He was appointed as Professor of Psychology at the University of Oslo in 2011. He still holds a part-time position as research professor at Norwegian Social Research. In 2014 he became head of a major research programme on violence initiated by the Norwegian government.

Mossige's research focuses on the epidemiology and consequences of violence and sexual abuse against children and youth, on psychological treatment of children and youth, and child welfare services. He is often cited in government reports and interviewed by Norwegian media about his fields of expertise.
