= Traumatic stress =

Common term for reactive anxiety and depression

Traumatic stress is a common term for reactive anxiety and depression, although it is not a medical term and is not included in the Diagnostic and Statistical Manual of Mental Disorders (DSM). The experience of traumatic stress include subtypes of anxiety, depression and disturbance of conduct along with combinations of these symptoms. This may result from events that are less threatening and distressing than those that lead to post-traumatic stress disorder. The fifth edition of the DSM describes in a section titled "Trauma and Stress-Related Disorders" disinhibited social engagement disorder, reactive attachment disorder, acute stress disorder, adjustment disorder, and post-traumatic stress disorder.

== Symptoms ==
Symptoms of traumatic stress can be both physical and emotional. Physical symptoms include trembling, shaking, a pounding heart, rapid breathing, choking feelings, stomach tightening/churning, dizziness/faintness, and cold sweats. Emotional symptoms include racing thoughts and excessive feelings of shock, disbelief, fear, sadness, helplessness, guilt, anger, shame and anxiety. Furthermore, many people revert to certain coping mechanisms. In children, that may include a loss of being able to take care of themselves (no longer able to eat on their own or be toilet trained). In adults, there can be an increase in impulsive behavior and dependence on others (leading to an inability for them to make "thoughtful, autonomous decisions".

== Types ==
=== Dis-inhibited social engagement disorder ===
Dis-inhibited social engagement disorder is a stress-related disorder stemming from neglect during childhood. According to Erikson's work on the stages of psychosocial development, the psycho-social crisis of trust versus mistrust during infancy causes neglect during that period to have permanent effects because a neglected infant does not learn to trust his parent(s). Feelings of mistrust and anxiety may eventually lead to traumatic stress, especially through dis-inhibited social engagement disorder, among others. Symptom persistence is necessary for a diagnosis of dis-inhibited social engagement disorder: specific symptoms must be present for at least twelve months.

=== Reactive attachment disorder ===
Reactive attachment disorder is a trauma disorder that arises when a parent does not console an upset child. A repetition of this behavior causes sadness, irritability, and fear, which can then lead to the disorder. A cluster of symptoms relating to indiscriminate behaviors is regarded as dis-inhibited social engagement disorder rather than reactive attachment disorder; symptoms of reactive attachment disorder must be inhibited. Both dis-inhibited social engagement disorder and reactive attachment disorder are related to severe pathogenic care.

=== Acute stress disorder ===
Another disorder in this category is acute stress disorder, which is listed in DSM-5 under code 308.3, ICD-10, F43.0. According to the DSM-5 "Acute Stress Disorder is caused by trauma (traumatic stress) and lasts at least 3 days."

=== Adjustment disorder ===
Another disorder in this category is adjustment disorder DSM-5 code 309, ICD-10, F43-2. "Adjustment disorder is a manipulative reaction to identifiable psycho-social stressor(s) or life change(s) characterized by preoccupation with the stressor and failure to adapt."

=== Post-traumatic stress disorder ===
The last disorder listed in the DSM-5 is post-traumatic stress disorder. "Post-traumatic stress disorder (PTSD) is a psychiatric disorder that can occur in people who have experienced or witnessed a traumatic event such as a natural disaster, a serious accident, a terrorist act, war/combat, rape or other violent personal assault." The diagnostic standards for PTSD encompass reliving the traumatic experience, avoiding triggers, and persistent hyperarousal. Post-traumatic stress disorder can affect people of all ages, including children as young as 2.

== See also ==
- Post-traumatic growth
- Symptoms of victimization
