= Disaster psychiatry =

Disaster psychiatry is a field of psychiatry which focuses on responding to natural disasters, climate change, school shootings, large accidents, public health emergencies, and their associated community-wide disruptions and mental health implications. Regardless of exact type, all disasters are characterized by disruption of family and community support structures, threats to personal safety, and overwhelming available support resources. Disaster psychiatry is a crucial component of disaster preparedness, aiming to mitigate immediate and prolonged psychiatric challenges. Its primary objective is to diminish acute symptoms and long-term psychiatric morbidity by minimizing exposure to stressors, offering education to normalize responses to trauma, and identifying individuals vulnerable to future psychiatric illness.

== Psychiatric Outcomes of Disasters ==
=== Normal and Pathological Trauma Response ===
Psychiatric responses to trauma and disaster encompass a spectrum of emotional and behavioral reactions in individuals. These reactions may include anxiety, fear, sadness, numbness, as well as disturbances in sleep, cognition, and mood. Additionally, an uptick in substance use is commonly observed. Formal psychiatric diagnoses commonly associated with exposure to acute traumatic events include Post-Traumatic Stress Disorder (PTSD) (intense feelings of terror, intrusive thoughts, and avoidance of emotional triggers, present for more than 1 month), and Acute Stress Disorder (ASD) (similar symptoms to PTSD but lasting less than 1 month), as well as Major Depressive Disorder MDD, separation anxiety disorder, substance abuse disorder, insomnia, and suicide. Psychiatric disturbances post-disaster can be attributed to various factors, including exposure to toxins, illness, dehydration, or acute injuries (such as traumatic brain injury) directly resulting from involvement in the disaster. Psychiatric illness may affect individuals with no known previous psychiatric history before the disaster. For example, after the Oklahoma City bombing, 40% of those with diagnosed MDD or PTSD had no previous psychiatric history before the attack. While research has explored whether certain types of disasters are more prone to causing psychiatric morbidity, the evidence suggests that the severity of a disaster is more influential than its exact typology.

=== Risk Factors and Assessment of Patients ===
One of the critical roles of the disaster psychiatrist is identifying individuals more prone to developing genuine psychiatric illnesses in response to a disaster, beyond the typical stress-response. The likelihood of future psychiatric morbidity increases with the intensity of traumatic stressors encountered.

Associated Risk Factors:

- Proximity to death or injury
- Perceived or actual threat to life
- Lack of control over external forces
- Occupying the role of a first responder
- Sustaining injuries, particularly Traumatic Brain Injury (TBI)
- Previous exposure to trauma
- Exposure to deceased or mutilated victims
- History of psychiatric illness
- Membership in high-risk demographic groups, such as children or the elderly

Assessment can involve standardized screening scales, such as the PCL-5 PTSD scale, which can be completed in 5–10 minutes, although this scale has not been validated in the disaster setting.

== Role of the Psychiatrist in Disaster Preparedness and Response ==
=== Unique Features of Disaster Psychiatry ===
In contrast to conventional psychiatric care, disaster psychiatry prioritizes mental health over disease states. The initial primary focus after a disaster is on individuals undergoing a transient and normal psychological response to a traumatic event. In this care paradigm, less emphasis may be placed on assigning diagnostic labels prematurely. Second, disaster psychiatry follows a preventative medicine model that is more akin to the investigation and outbreak of an infectious disease. In this paradigm, the pathogen (psychiatric symptoms), the source (traumatic event/disaster), and the exposed individuals (patients) are identified.

=== Disaster Preparedness ===
Incorporating psychiatric professionals into community-level disaster planning facilitates their introduction to various stakeholders, including local police, fire departments, schools, and government officials. The principal aim of psychiatry in disaster preparedness is to proactively prevent exposure to stressors, ultimately avoiding disasters or minimizing their impact on individuals. Hospitals are mandated to have a disaster response plan to meet accreditation requirements, such as those outlined by JCAHO. These can include considerations for the psychiatric elements of disaster response, making stakeholders aware of available resources and potential adverse effects on community mental health resulting from disasters.

Additionally, the preparedness of local psychiatric resources can be tested through disaster exercises, identifying areas of weakness and ways to increase mental health systems' capacity to respond to increased demands during disasters.

=== Acute Intervention ===
Natural resilience is common in the face of disaster, and most victims (70-90%) do not need formal psychiatric treatment. First-year PTSD prevalence is 10-20% in the general population after a disaster (higher in disaster workers), with about 25% of those with PTSD symptoms going on to experience chronic dysfunction. Early interventions are crucial for addressing PTSD symptoms after a disaster, as symptoms meeting full diagnostic criteria may not immediately manifest in the initial disaster stages. Psychiatrists may be on-site at the disaster area to emphasize limiting exposure to distressing scenes (scenes of violence, deceased bodies, etc.) and ensuring victim privacy, informing future response planning.

Debriefing, held shortly after an event, normalizes stress responses, aids psychological recovery, corrects cognitive distortions, and helps individuals return to social and work groups without formal evaluation, which some victims may be hesitant to participate in. This debriefing may involve Psychological First Aid (PFA) – a broadly-applicable therapeutic framework which reduces stigma without formal diagnosis or treatment. PFA takes a flexible, educational, and supportive approach, focusing on psychological safety, community self-reliance, connectedness, and instilling hope by building personal strength.

High-risk or severe cases may necessitate early intervention with psychotherapy, particularly Cognitive Behavioral Therapy (CBT), which is a well-studied early treatment focusing on social and emotional regulation. Psychiatric medications, such as antidepressants, sleep aids, and anti-anxiety medications, may be considered for acute stabilization of severely impacted patients. SSRIs and SNRIs are typically first-line medications. Goals include managing symptoms, treating grief and loss, early recognition and treatment of psychiatric disorders, managing relapses of previously diagnosed psychiatric illness in response to disaster, and differentiating between normal and pathological responses to trauma.

=== Community Intervention ===
The aftermath of a disaster often brings additional stress and disruption, influenced mainly by the response to the event. Communities may feel overwhelmed by outsiders, including intrusive media and curiosity seekers, straining local resources like hotels and restaurants at a time when a community may be more interested in seeking solace and resources from within. The disruption of psychiatric well-being is directly tied to the degree of community and workplace disruption, including disruption of economic resources. This impact can persist long after the disaster, which is evident in debates over memorial design and recurrent grief over anniversaries of the disaster. Normalizing feelings of anxiety and fear using popular media is one approach to addressing these challenges.
