= Thomas Espeseth =

Thomas Espeseth (born 1973) is a Norwegian psychologist, neuroscientist and Professor of Psychology at the University of Oslo. He researches cognitive neurogenetics, such as genetic effects on the brains's morphology, physiology, and cognitive functions. In 2008 he received His Majesty The King's Gold Medal for his research. According to Google Scholar, he has been cited over 15000 times in scientific literature and has an h-index of 54.
