= Academic ranks in Norway =

Academic ranks in Norway are the system of merit-based ranks used by academic employees in academia. Similar to the British rank system, the Norwegian rank system is broadly divided into three pathways, a combined research and teaching career pathway, a research career pathway and a teaching career pathway.

In general the combined pathway is the norm at teaching-focused institutions such as universities and colleges, the research pathway is the norm at elite research institutes which only or primarily engage in research—such as the Norwegian Institute of International Affairs (NUPI)—while the more recent teaching pathway is a much less used alternative to the combined pathway primarily at colleges and former colleges that have recently become "new universities" and that are less research-intensive than older universities.

The main ordinary combined ranks in Norway are assistant professor, associate professor and professor, which directly correspond to researcher, senior researcher and research professor with identical formal promotion criteria. The junior, temporary ranks of research assistant, research fellow and postdoctoral fellow are shared between the combined and research pathways. Research professors at elite research institutes (e.g. NUPI) concentrate on research and research leadership roles, and often serve in governmental committees; ordinary professorships at colleges and universities on the other hand concentrate on teaching and only have about 30% research time on average. Due to the more meritorious nature of research in academia, a research professorship is considered more prestigious by some, but formally research professors and other professors are of equal rank.

== Overview of main ranks ==
The research ranks and the combined research and teaching ranks have exactly the same promotion criteria and the ranks are equivalent, both administratively and academically. The teaching career pathway ranks have their own promotion criteria, and while they administratively rank alongside the research and combined ranks, they do not directly correspond to ranks in the European Framework for Research Careers. Temporary ranks are in green.

| Formal level (European Framework for Research Careers) | Research ranks | Research and teaching ranks | Teaching ranks |
|---|---|---|---|
| Full professor (chair) level R4 Leading Researcher | Research professor (forsker I / forskningsprofessor) | Professor (professor) | Docent (dosent); Specific requirements: Docent competence |
| Full professor (chair) level R4 Leading Researcher | Identical requirements: (Full) professor competence | | |
| Associate professor /senior researcher level R3 Established Researcher | Senior researcher (forsker II / seniorforsker) | Associate professor (førsteamanuensis) | Senior lecturer (førstelektor); Specific requirements: Senior lecturer competence |
| Associate professor /senior researcher level R3 Established Researcher | Identical requirements: Associate professor competence | | |
| Post-doctoral level R2 Recognised Researcher | Postdoctoral fellow (postdoktor) | | |
| Assistant professor /researcher level | Researcher (forsker III / forsker) | Assistant professor (amanuensis, universitetslektor, høgskolelektor) | |
| Assistant professor /researcher level | Identical requirements: Assistant professor competence | | |
| First stage level R1 First Stage Researcher | Research fellow (stipendiat) | | |
| First stage level R1 First Stage Researcher | Research assistant (vitenskapelig assistent) | | |

== Career pathways ==
Norway has three academic career pathways, which are roughly similar to those of the United Kingdom:

- The combined research and teaching career pathway is the normal academic career pathway at universities and colleges. It encompasses both research and teaching with the emphasis on research and research-based teaching, traditionally equally divided in the two highest ranks at the country's only ancient university (the University of Oslo), although colleges and new universities tend to be less research-intensive. On average across the country full professors devote 31% of their time to research, associate professors 28% and assistant professors only 15%. Promotion is based on research merits.
- The research career pathway is focused on research, and is primarily and traditionally the normal academic career pathway at elite research institutions such as the Norwegian Institute of International Affairs (NUPI) and other research-only or research-focused institutes. The research ranks were introduced by the Government in 1959 for use in elite research institutions in connection with parliament's establishment of NUPI that year, and as directly equivalent to the combined ranks. More recently the research ranks have been introduced at universities for academics with few or no teaching obligations who devote most of their time to research; however in most cases the choice of this pathway over the combined pathway is only related to the type of institution. Researchers in this pathway, especially in the higher grades, tend to be nationally or internationally recognised experts who frequently serve on government expert committees. The research ranks researcher, senior researcher and research professor are directly equivalent to the combined ranks assistant professor, associate professor and professor, and the promotion criteria are identical. While seldom obliged to teach, research academics often supervise PhD students and sometimes take on more limited teaching activities at the advanced level. Research management, supervision and guidance of younger researchers is also commonly part of their work. Promotion is based on research merits. Due to the higher prestige of research and the typically higher prestige of the elite research institutes compared to most Norwegian universities and colleges, this pathway is considered more prestigious by some, and on average, research academics tend to be more recognised researchers than academics in the combined pathway.
- The teaching career pathway is focused on essential teaching (mainly at the lower level), educational needs and for senior ranks also pedagogic development and/or research, and is mainly used at professional colleges or new universities as an alternative to the research and teaching career pathway. Promotion criteria are focused on teaching merits, including pedagogic development and for senior ranks also pedagogic research. However, both the government and the professional colleges are placing increased emphasis on research qualifications, leading to debate over the future of the teaching career pathway. The universities and colleges tend to promote the combined pathway, and there are more than twenty times as many academics in the combined pathway, while the teaching pathway is fading into de facto obscurity.

== Research and teaching ranks and research-only ranks ==
Norway currently has two professorial ranks, the normal rank of (full) professor, and the more rare rank of research professor, which requires similar competence as a professor. Additionally, Norway has a part-time full professor rank which is designated as Professor II, but which is otherwise identical to the normal full professor rank. All these ranks are equal to professor (chair) in the United Kingdom.

All people who are appointed as (or promoted to) professors, research professors or professors II must have formal professor competence according to Norwegian law, that is, they must be awarded such competence through an evaluation by a scientific, independent committee following a specific procedure. Such evaluations are carried out in two circumstances; in connection with an application for a position as professor (even applicants who don't get the specific position may be awarded professor competence), or, since the 1990s, in connection with an individual application for promotion from associate professor to professor. Before the 1990s, professor competence was only awarded by direct application for an advertised position as professor, as there was no promotion procedure.

The title of "visiting professor" does not exist legally in Norway, but is sometimes used informally by full professors at foreign universities who stay as guests at Norwegian universities without being formally employed there. The title "professor" can legally only be used in Norway by (full) professors formally employed as such in salaried positions at Norwegian universities. In practice the use of the title by full professors deemed to be of comparable standing to Norwegian full professors and at foreign universities deemed to be of sufficient quality is generally accepted, but in no circumstances may foreign assistant or associate professors call themselves "professors" or "visiting professors" in Norway.

Full professors in Norway with secondary, part-time positions (20% or less) are called professor II. They usually have a different main position (typically as a senior consultant at a university hospital, as a professor at a different university in Norway or abroad or as a research professor at a research-only institute). While they only hold a part-time position as professor at the institution in question, they otherwise hold the same status as other professors, need to have the same competence as other professors, are styled as simply professor (not professor II) and are sometimes (especially at medical faculties) eligible to be elected deans of their faculty. The numeral "II" merely indicates that it is a secondary position, not that it ranks below other professors. As the title professor is used very restrictively in Norway only for the most senior academics, professor II positions carry the same high prestige as full-time and permanent professorships. Within the field of medicine, most professorships are professor II positions combined with a main position as a senior consultant at a university hospital (full-time professorships in clinical medicine are very rare). Professors II may engage in teaching, supervision (typically of PhD candidates) or research. The position is often used to strengthen cooperation between academic institutions, as well as attracting prominent academics from more prestigious universities in Norway or from abroad.

=== Professor ===
In Norway, the word "professor" is only used for full professors, i.e. the most senior academics who hold chairs at universities or other academic institutions at a similar level. The title is protected by law, and may only be used by a select number of accredited institutions under certain conditions. Professors belong to the R4 (Leading Researcher) group in the European Framework for Research Careers.

Prior to 1990, all professors were appointed for life by the King upon the advice of the cabinet, that is, by the King-in-Council; they thus held the elevated status of embedsmann (a higher civil servant appointed directly by the King who could not be terminated unless convicted by the Supreme Court). In the 19th and parts of the 20th century, the appointment of a professor was a clearly political decision that often involved cabinet-level proceedings; from the 20th century, with the increasing number of appointments and the establishment of more universities, the cabinet-level proceedings became routine in most cases, and nearly always followed the recommendations of the universities' own committees. From 1990 the institutions received the right to formally appoint professors themselves. Historically there were a given number of professors and each professor was appointed to a specific chair. Currently each institution can establish professorships at will and promote associate professors to full professors if they meet the statutory requirements.

At the University of Oslo, professors are in theory expected to dedicate 50% of their time to research and the other 50% to teaching and related duties. At the newer universities, the research percentage may be less than 50%.

Appointments are usually for life, although time-limited appointments are possible (especially if the position is externally funded). The mandatory age of retirement in Norway is 70, however. Professors who have turned 70 are required to leave their positions, but by law retain the right to use the professor title. They may also use the title "professor emeritus/emerita." In some cases retired professors may keep their office, and they usually have access to university infrastructure as long as they are still active as researchers.

In the official hierarchy of civil servants, professors traditionally formed part of the chief executive group (sjefsregulativet) alongside e.g. directors-general in government ministries and supreme court justices, with a salary in the top one percentage of all government employees. The annual salary of full professors varies between around 75,000 and in excess of 100,000 euro, often depending on the institution and discipline, with the highest salaries found at the law faculty of the country's preeminent university, the University of Oslo. On average as of 2018, a salary in the range 80,000 to 90,000 euro is normal at most institutions.

==== Research professor ====
Research professor (Norwegian: forsker I, forskningsprofessor or forsker med professorkompetanse) is a rank at the full professor level and is formally equivalent to the ordinary full professor (chair) rank; in practice research professors rank higher than normal full professors, as they are usually more prominent as researchers. For example in fields such as political science/international relations, a position as research professor at an Oslo-based elite research institution such as the Norwegian Institute of International Affairs is considered more prestigious than a normal professorship. Both professors and research professors belong to the R4 (Leading Researcher) group in the European Framework for Research Careers, the highest group. In general research professors concentrate on research and research leadership roles, and have few or no teaching obligations; however research professors often selectively devote a smaller amount of their time to supervising PhD candidates.

The title research professor is primarily the top academic rank in the hierarchy of Norway's elite research institutions, such as the Norwegian Institute of International Affairs (for which the rank was created) and other research-only or research-focused institutions, as opposed to the teaching-focused university and college sector. More recently, the rank has been introduced in exceptional circumstances at universities. Research professors are almost always permanent employees (equivalent to tenure) and tend to be internationally leading academics. Due to the relatively higher prestige and meritorious nature of research compared to teaching, a position as research professor with the right to engage in research full-time may be seen by some as more desirable and prestigious than a normal professor position with far less research time; whereas most research professors may devote all their time to research, a normal full professor is on average only able to devote about 30% of their time to research. Hence, the title of research professor is often viewed as the highest possible rank in Norwegian academia, de facto ranking above the average full professor (Norway does not have named chairs or distinguished professorships).

The Norwegian title forsker I literally means "researcher I" or "scientist I," but the title is always translated into English as research professor as the Norwegian title system with numerals is not used in any other countries or understood outside Norway. It is the most senior rank for a researcher without teaching obligations, is equivalent to the ordinary full professor rank at universities, and ranks above senior researcher and associate professor. The rank was introduced by the government in 1959, and formed part of the chief executive group (sjefsregulativet) in the government hierarchy alongside e.g. professors, directors-general in government ministries and supreme court justices. Research professors originally received exactly the same salary as ordinary full professors in the top one percentage of all public employees in Norway; the salaries of both groups are no longer centrally regulated, but are still roughly comparable.

Research professors are required to have the same qualifications as full professors at universities, that is formal professor competence awarded by an independent committee. They sometimes hold part-time professorial chairs at universities or colleges, so-called professor II positions, in order to be able to devote a smaller amount of their time to teaching and maintain contact with a teaching environment. The position is the equivalent of the British and Commonwealth rank Professorial Research Fellow/Research Professor and broadly corresponds to the Danish, Swedish and Finnish rank forskningsprofessor (research professor).

A research professor frequently heads research groups, and supervision and guidance of junior and mid-level researchers is commonly part of the job. Research professors are typically also strongly involved in the management of their institutes, and institute directors and research directors are often recruited from their ranks. While not normally obliged to teach, research professors often supervise PhD candidates and may sometimes choose to take on more limited teaching activities, usually at the advanced level.

=== Reader ===
The traditional position of docent, which existed until 1985, ranked below professor and above associate professor. It applied to people of the same competence as a professor who did not hold a professorial chair and who formally ranked below professors. The position was abolished in 1985, when all docents received the title of professor. The rank was directly comparable to the British rank reader and frequently translated as such. Like the British reader rank it lacked a direct equivalent in the American system, and was regarded as equal to the American full professor rank.

=== Associate professor ===
Today, the position below full professor is called førsteamanuensis ("first amanuensis"), which is officially translated as associate professor in English.

By law the position requires as a minimum a Norwegian doctoral degree, or similar competence. In practice it requires additional qualifications, especially publications in peer-reviewed journals. Most universities announce vacancies at the associate professor level, with the right to apply for promotion to full professor.

On average, an associate professor earns an annual salary of around 60,000 euro.

Associate professors may occasionally be employed in small part-time positions, similar to professors II and for similar reasons. However, there is not a separate position formally called "førsteamanuensis II". The term "førsteamanuensis II" is sometimes used informally for individuals with a part-time position as associate professor in the normal code (SKO 1011) that is also used for full-time associate professors.

=== Senior Researcher ===
The rank of senior researcher (Norwegian: seniorforsker or forsker II), now with code 1109/1110, was introduced in the state in 1959 as equivalent to the associate professor position. The formal requirement for the position is the same as for associate professor, i.e. a doctoral degree or equivalent scientific competence; the individual research institutes may also set requirements in addition to this when hiring. It is the middle position in the research hierarchy. Researchers in this position code are, as a general rule, permanently employed in the institute sector. In the European Framework for Research Careers, senior researcher and associate professor both belong to the second highest category R3 (established researcher).

The competence requirement for the position is stipulated in the Government Personnel Handbook as "Norwegian doctoral degree, or foreign doctoral degree approved as equivalent to Norwegian doctoral degree, or Norwegian associate professor competence, or documented competence at equivalent level through scientific work of similar scope and quality". A researcher who obtains such competence is entitled to promotion to senior researcher.

Codes 1109 and 1110 have identical qualification requirements at most institutions and are therefore in practice considered to be identical; 1110 is largely unused and is being phased out at most institutions. 1110 does not have its own regulations in the Government Personnel Handbook, but is mentioned together with SKO 1109 as one of two position codes that can apply for promotion to the highest position, research professor.

=== Assistant professor ===
The position below førsteamanuensis is called amanuensis, universitetslektor or høgskolelektor, which are all translated into English as assistant professor (in a US context) or lecturer (in a UK context). On average an assistant professor earns an annual salary of around 50,000 euro.

=== Researcher ===
The rank of researcher (Norwegian: forsker III), now with code 1108, was introduced in the state in 1959 as equivalent to university lecturer and assistant professor positions. Known as only researcher in English, the position is usually called forsker or forsker III in Norwegian. The formal requirement is a higher degree examination (master's degree, official examination, master's degree or similar). The institutions may have requirements for qualifications beyond this, such as a certain amount of research competence. In the same way as for the university lecturer position, new appointments at the researcher level have become less common after the turn of the millennium, but may still occur, especially at institutes with a more applied scope; otherwise, it is common for researchers with a master's degree or equivalent to instead be employed as research fellows to pursue a doctorate.

== Teaching-based ranks ==
The rank førstelektor ("first lecturer") is a less scientific alternative to førsteamanuensis, and promotion to this rank is based mainly on teaching qualifications. In practice it ranks between amanuensis/universitetslektor/høgskolelektor and førsteamanuensis. It corresponds to the British and Commonwealth rank Senior Teaching Fellow.

A new rank called undervisningsdosent ("teaching docent") was introduced in 2003, and this rank was renamed simply dosent ("docent") in 2006. It is unrelated to the historical docent rank, and is mainly used at professional colleges as the highest teaching-based rank, as opposed to the research-based professor rank. It corresponds to the British and Commonwealth rank Professorial Teaching Fellow.

== Junior temporary ranks ==
Norway has three junior ranks intended to qualify the holders for careers in research.

Research assistant (vitenskapelig assistent) is the most junior rank, and may be either a graduate student or a person who already has a master's degree who works on a research project under the supervision of an experienced researcher, usually at the associate professor level or higher. Often the position is a stepping stone to become a research fellow and enrol in a doctoral programme.

Research fellow (stipendiat) is a temporary employee who is enrolled in a doctoral program. In Norway they are not regarded as students, but as researchers and academic employees, and traditionally they are somewhat older and more experienced than PhD students in most other countries, most typically in their 30s, although it has been entirely normal for research fellows to be in their 40s, especially in the field of medicine. A research fellow earns an annual salary of around 45,000 euro. They used to typically be employed for four years, but now three years is normal. They are usually required to devote some of their time to teaching, typically at the undergraduate level.

Postdoctoral fellow (postdoktor) is the most senior of the temporary ranks. The position is held by those have a PhD and it is intended to qualify them for a position as associate professor or senior researcher. A postdoctoral fellow earns slightly less than an assistant professor, on average around 50,000 euro annually.

=== Teaching career pathway ===
- Dosent, formerly called undervisningsdosent (teaching docent; introduced in 2003 and renamed dosent in 2006; mostly used in professional colleges, but unrelated to the historical dosent rank; equivalent to Professorial Teaching Fellow in the UK)
- Førstelektor (first lecturer; equivalent to Senior Teaching Fellow in the UK)
- Universitetslektor (university lecturer), høgskolelektor (college lecturer) or amanuensis (amanuensis), all usually translated as assistant professor or lecturer; this rank is formally also the lowest rank of the combined pathway, although rank holders are usually not allocated more than 20% research time
