= University of Oslo Faculty of Medicine =

Faculty of Medicine
- Det medisinske fakultet
- Formation: 1814; 212 years ago
- Type: University Faculty
- Location: Oslo
- Dean: Hanne-Cathrin Flinstad Harbo
- Parent organization: University of Oslo
- Staff: 1909 (2025)
- Website: www.med.uio.no

The Faculty of Medicine of the University of Oslo is the oldest and largest research and educational institution in medicine in Norway. It was founded in 1814, effectively as a Norwegian continuation of the Faculty of Medicine at the University of Copenhagen, the only university of Denmark-Norway until 1811. It was Norway's only medical faculty until the Cold War era.

The Dean is the Faculty's chief executive. From 2023 Hanne-Cathrin Flinstad Harbo is the elected dean. Her team consists of four Deputy Deans: Pro-Dean for Research and Innovation Jan G. Bjålie, Pro-Dean for Studies Magnus Løberg, Vice-Dean for Research and Research Education Grete Dyb and Vice-Dean for Bachelor and Master Studies Eli Feiring.

The Faculty consists of three institutes and one center: Institute of Clinical Medicine, Institute of Basic Medical Science, Institute of Health and Society and Centre for Molecular Biosciences and Medicine Norway (NCMBM).

Core activities are research, education, dissemination and innovation. The Faculty's teaching and research ranges from basic biomedical disciplines via clinical studies to health topics with a global profile. In addition to the medical program, the faculty offers studies in clinical nutrition, health management, international community health, interdisciplinary health Research, public health and epidemiology.

The faculty has around 2,000 employees (1300 man-years), 2200 students and 1400 PhD candidates. Campuses are at various hospitals in the Oslo area.

== Deans ==
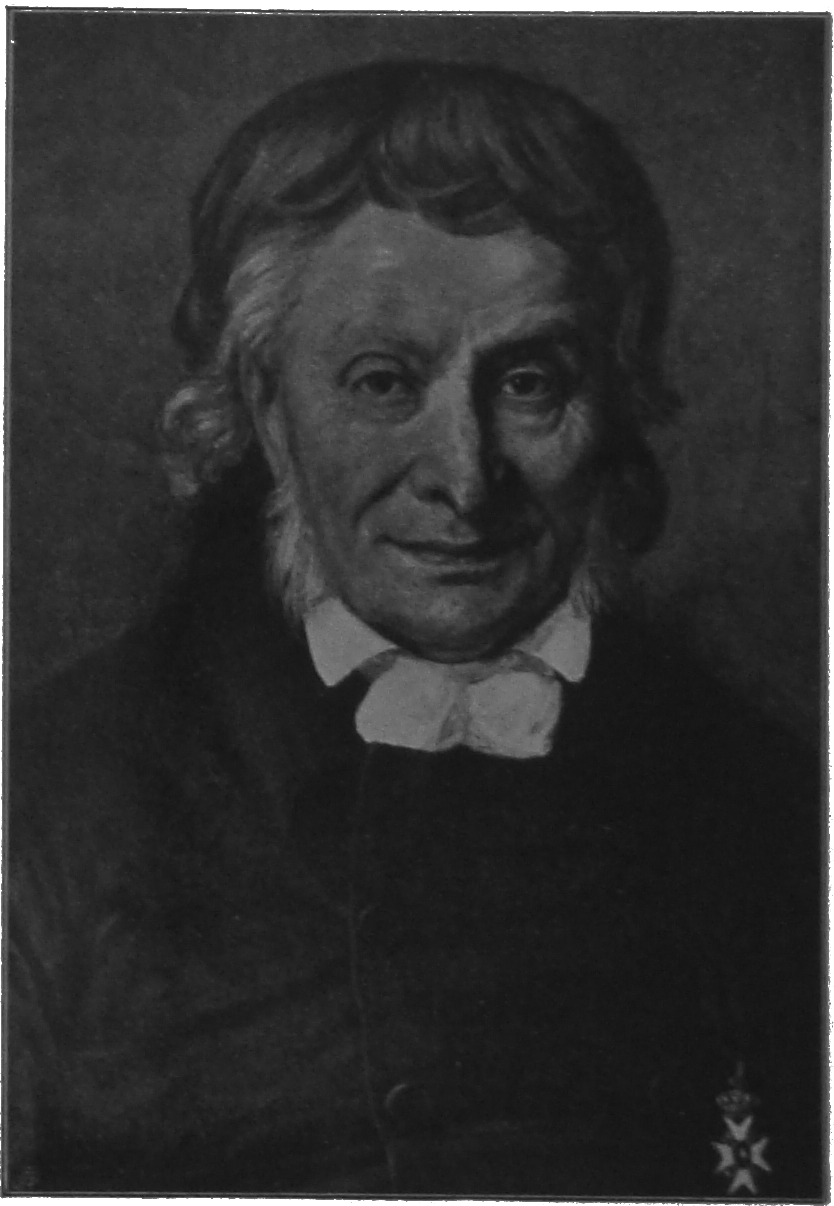
Michael Skjelderup, the first dean and the first professor of medicine at the university

- Hanne-Cathrin Flinstad Harbo 2023–
- Ivar Prydz Gladhaug 2019–2022
- Frode Vartdal 2011–2018
- Finn Georg Brun Wisløff 2007–2010
- Stein A. Evensen 1998–2006
- Gunnar Tellnes 1998
- Jon Dale 1996-1998
- Per Jørgen Wiggen Vaglum 1990–1996
- Erik Thorsby 1989–1990
- Kaare R. Norum 1986–1989
- Ivar Hørven 1980–1986
- Morten Harboe 1977–1980
- Bjarne A. Waaler 1974–1977
- Jon Utheim Lundevall 1971–1974
- Haakon Natvig 1968–1970
- Thore Lie Thomassen 1967
- Alf Brodal 1964-1966
- Axel Christian Smith Strøm 1956-1963
- Georg Henrik Magnus Waaler 1953-1955
- Torleif Bjarne Dale 1946-1952
- Georg Herman Monrad-Krohn 1941-1945
- Theodor Kristian Brun Frølich 1938-1940
- Otto Lous Mohr 1935-1937
- Johan Gustav Edvin Bruusgaard 1932-1934
- Ragnar Vogt 1929-1931
- Johan Nicolaysen 1926-1928
- Kristian Emil Schreiner 1923-1945
- Kristian Kornelius Hagemann Brandt 1922
- Axel Holst 1919-1921
- Peter Fredrik Holst 1917-1919
- Hjalmar August Schiøtz 1914-1916
- Francis Gottfred Harbitz 1911-1913
- Hagbarth Strøm 1909-1910
- Cæsar Peter Møller Boeck 1907-1908
- Søren Bloch Laache 1905-1906
- Poul Edvard Poulsson 1904
- Axel Holst 1901-1903
- Edvard Schønberg 1899-1900
- Sophus Torup 1897-1898
- Gustav Adolf Guldberg 1895-1896
- Edvard Schønberg 1893-1894
- Johan Storm Aubert Hjort 1891-1892
- Hjalmar Heiberg 1889-1890
- Julius Nicolaysen 1887-1888
- Emanuel Frederik Hagbarth Winge 1885-1886
- Edvard Schønberg 1883-1884
- Jacob Worm Müller 1881-1882
- Johan Storm Aubert Hjort 1879-1880
- Hjalmar Heiberg 1877-1878
- Julius Nicolaysen 1875-1876
- Emanuel Fredrik Hagbarth Winge 1871-1874
- Joachim Andreas Voss 1869-1870
- Christian Peter Bianco Boeck 1867-1868
- Frants Christian Faye 1865-1866
- Joachim Andreas Voss 1863-1864
- Andreas Christian Conradi 1861-1862
- Christian Peter Bianco Boeck 1859-1860
- Frederik Holst 1857-1858
- Christen Heiberg 1855-1856
- Carl Wilhelm Boeck 1853-1854
- Frants Christian Faye 1851-1852
- Andreas Christian Conradi 1849-1850
- Christian Peter Bianco Boeck 1847-1848
- Christen Heiberg 1846
- Frederik Holst 1845
- Christian Peter Bianco Boeck 1844
- Christen Heiberg 1843
- Frederik Holst 1842
- Magnus Andreas Thulstrup 1841
- Michael Skjelderup 1840
- Frederik Holst 1839
- Christen Heiberg 1838
- Magnus Andreas Thulstrup 1837
- Nils Berner Sørenssen 1836
- Frederik Holst 1834-1835
- Magnus Andreas Thulstrup 1833
- Nils Berner Sørenssen 1832
- Michael Skjelderup 1830-1831
- Frederik Holst 1828-1829
- Nils Berner Sørensen 1826-1827
- Magnus Andreas Thulstrup 1825
- Michael Skjelderup 1816-1824
