= Christen Heiberg =

Christen Heiberg may refer to:

- Christen Heiberg (civil servant) (1737–1801), Norwegian civil servant
- Christen Heiberg (physician) (1799–1872), Norwegian surgeon
