= Ernst Håkon Jahr =

Norwegian linguist (born 1948)

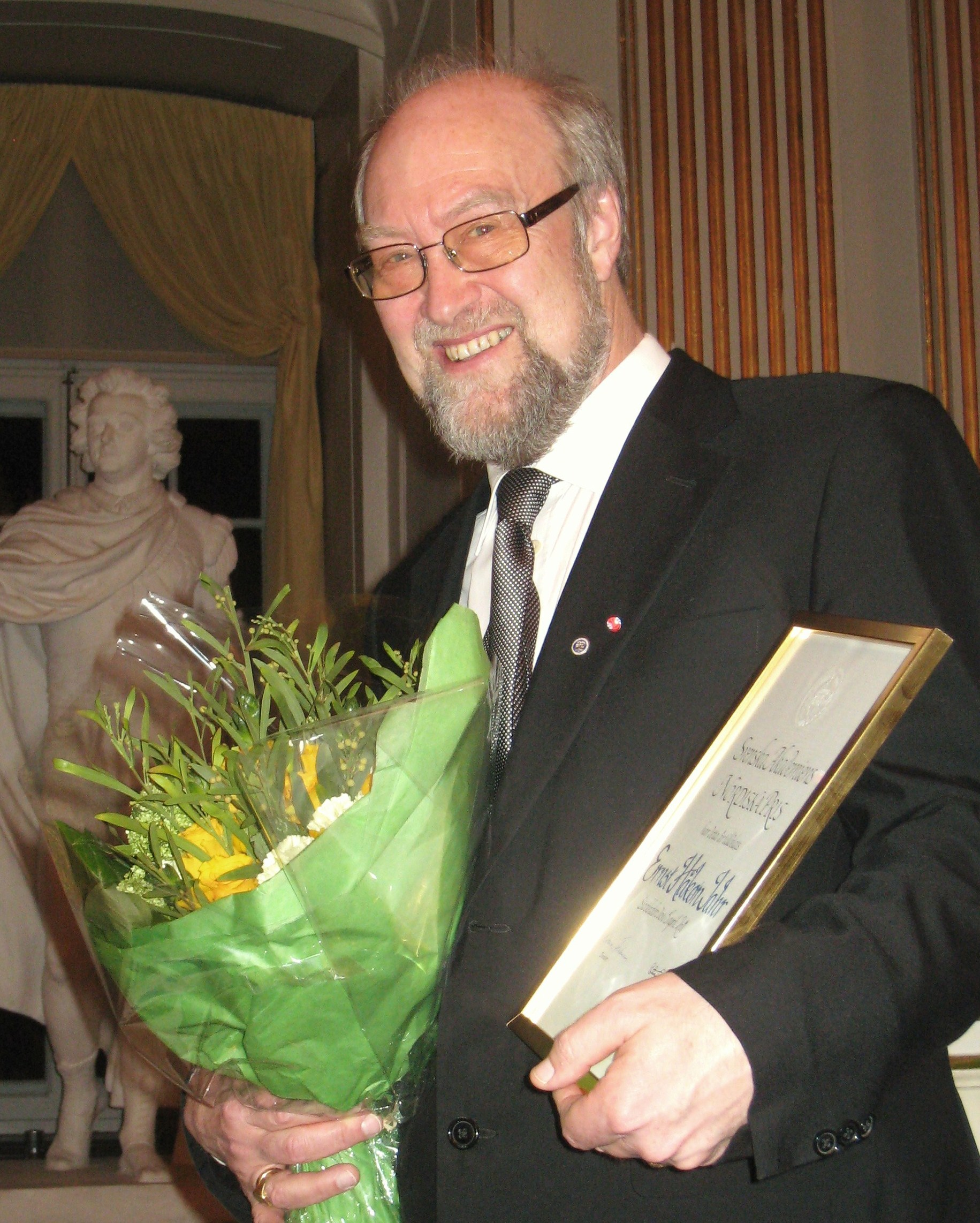
Ernst Håkon Jahr receiving the Swedish Academy's Nordic Prize (2011), known as the 'little Nobel'.

Ernst Håkon Jahr (born 4 March 1948) is a Norwegian linguist with about 230 publications, including about 50 books. He is currently (2012) dean of the Faculty of Humanities and Education at the University of Agder.

He was born in Oslo, and took his cand.philol. (PhD) degree at the University of Oslo in 1976, and his dr.philos. (i.e., Dr. hab.) degree at the University of Tromsø in 1984. He worked as an associate professor at the University of Tromsø from 1976, as professor of Scandinavian linguistics from 1986. In 1999 he moved to Agder University College, where he served as rector from 2000 to 2007. He was succeeded in August 2007, only one month before the University College became the University of Agder. He biographised the linguist Clara Holst in the book Clara Holst – kvinnelig pionér i akademia i Norge (2006).

He is a member of the Royal Norwegian Society of Sciences and Letters and the Norwegian Academy of Science and Letters and several foreign academies. In 2002, he initiated the establishment and was elected the president of the Agder Academy of Sciences and Letters, which 2011 has 220 elected members from Agder, Norway outside Agder and from abroad. He is elected member of eight academies in Norway and abroad. Jahr holds an honorary degree from the Adam Mickiewicz University in Poznań and from the Uppsala University. In 2008 he was proclaimed a Knight, First Class of the Royal Norwegian Order of St. Olav. In 2011, he was awarded the Swedish Academy's Nordic Prize, known as the 'little Nobel'.

== Selected bibliography ==
This is a list of his most notable works:

- Talemålet i skolen (1984)
- Utsyn over norsk språkhistorie etter 1814 (1989)
- Den store dialektboka (ed., 1990)
- Innhogg i nyare norsk språkhistorie (1992)
- Nordnorske dialektar (ed., 1996)

Academic offices
Preceded by Knut Brautaset	Rector of the Agder University College; 2000–2007	Succeeded by Torunn Lauvdal
