= Brautaset =

Brautaset is a surname. Notable people with the surname include:

- Knut Brautaset (born 1939), Norwegian engineer;
- Tarald Brautaset (born 1946), Norwegian diplomat.
