= G. H. Monrad-Krohn =

Norwegian neurologist (1884–1964)

Georg Herman Monrad-Krohn
- Born: March 14, 1884; Bergen, Norway
- Died: 1 September 1964 (aged 80); Oslo, Norway
- Education: National Hospital London, UK, Pitié-Salpêtrière Hospital, Neurological University Clinic, Oslo, University of Oslo
- Known for: neurobiology, reflexology, language disorders
- Medical career
- Profession: Neurologist
- Institutions: University of Oslo
- Sub-specialties: Neurology
- Research: neurology, particularly the nervous system
- Awards: Michael Skjelderup Gold Medal; Fellow of the Royal College of Surgeons; Fellow of the Royal Society of Medicine

Georg Herman Monrad-Krohn (14 March 1884 – 1 September 1964), born in Bergen, Norway, is known for his work on the development of neurology early in the 20th century. He studied at the National Hospital, Queens Square in London, and often visited Paris, France to work in the Pitié-Salpêtrière Hospital facilities. In 1917 he returned to Norway, and began studies at the Neurological University Clinic of Oslo (Rikshospitalet), where he was appointed a Professor in 1922. In 1927 he became Professor of Neurology at the University of Oslo, and later Emeritus Professor of Neurology.. He retired from this professorial chair at the age of 70. His son, the computer engineer and entrepreneur Lars Monrad-Krohn was born in 1933. Monrad-Krohn died in 1964 after a long career in what both he and Acta Neurologica Scandinavica termed "the struggle for neurology".

== Career ==
Monrad-Krohn was interested in various language disorders, in particular dysprosody, and he introduced the term aprosody to that field. He wrote a book entitled 'The Clinical Examination of the Nervous System', of which seven editions were reproduced as texts to be read in the study of the area. These are now considered antiquarian, and are collector's items. He was also particularly interested in reflexes. His 1918 thesis was based on observations of abdominal reflexes. In 1922 he undertook a major study of facial reflexes in patients with leprosy, and the paralysis displayed by them. The facial mimicry displayed by them despite their paralysis, termed "paradoxical emotional hypermimia" was given the name "Monrad-Krohn Sign".

Over the course of his career he received the following awards and appointments:

- Michael Skjelderup Gold Medal 1910
- Norwegian Neurological Association, Chairman 1921-1931
- Public Health Association, Chairman 1925-1931
- The Norwegian Academy of Science, elected 1929
- Member of the neurological companies in France, Denmark and Estonia, etc.
- Fellow of the Royal College of Surgeons and the Fellow of the Royal Society of Medicine in the UK
- Honorary doctorate at the University of Gothenburg 1954
- The representative of the Faculty of Medicine at the University of Oslo since 1945
- Honorary member of the Norwegian Neurological Association, Svenska läkaresällskapet, American Academy of Neurology and the Société de Neuroscience de France
- Knight of 1 class of the Norwegian St. Olav 1952, the Danish Dannebrog, the Swedish Nordstjärneorden and officer of the French Legion of Honour

== Monrad-Krohn Prize ==
In 1933 he introduced Monrad Krohn's Prize for the Advancement of Neurological Research. This prize is awarded by the Medical Faculty of the University of Oslo annually, to either researchers, or research facilities, deemed to have contributed by means of research to progress in the field of neurology.
