= Johan Henrik Nebelong =

Danish architect

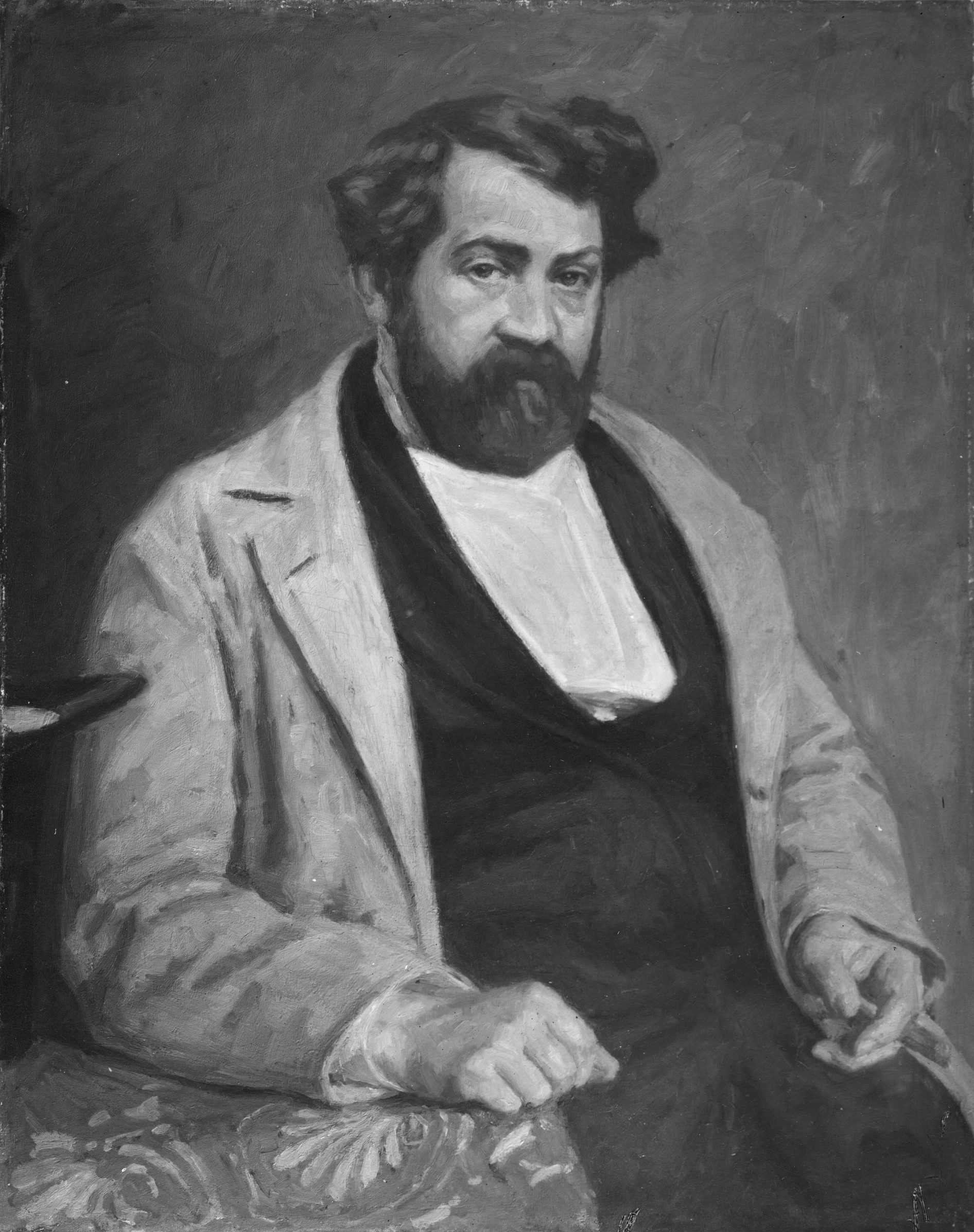
Johan Henrik Portrait

Johan Henrik Nebelong (20 July 1817 – 2 March 1871) was a Danish architect. He worked in Norway from 1840 to 1853 and was best known for interior design work on Oscarshall (1847–1852). Nebelong also taught at the Royal Academy of Arts in Copenhagen.

== Biography ==
He was born in Copenhagen, Denmark. He was the son of Johan Henrik Nebelong and Anna Christine Schreyber and was a younger brother of architect Niels Sigfried Nebelong. Nebelong was a student of Professor Gustav Friedrich Hetsch in Copenhagen. He later enrolled at the Royal Academy of Arts. At the Academy, he won the prestigious silver medal in 1839. The accolade was followed immediately by a proposal to come to Christiania (now Oslo) and assist the architect Hans Linstow. Nebelong was hired to assist Linstow in drawing interior works of the Norwegian Royal Palace. In 1842, he received a government grant to study in Germany.

His buildings include the customs house (Tollpakkhuset), Commanders living quarters at Akershus festning (Kommandantboligen) and De naturhistoriske samlinger at Bergen Museum. He was also involved in renovation projects including the excavations of the Hovedøya monastery and reconstruction on Heddal Stave Church (Heddal stavkirke) in Telemark (1851).

Nebelong also worked closely with architect Heinrich Ernst Schirmer, decorative painter Peter Frederik Wergmann (1802–1869), and painter Johannes Flintoe. This quartet worked under the guidance of Hans Linstow. Although Linstow's influence stimulated much in Nebelong, the latter soon developed his signature designs and style. Nebelong is often associated with the new Swiss style and the unique style with which he infused his refurbished masonry designs such as the large apartment building for Danish builder Nestor Malthe.

== Buildings ==
The apartment building (Heiberggården) of Professor Christen Heiberg was the first building Nebelong designed in Swiss style. The building on the corner of Karl Johans gate and Rosenkrantz gate in Oslo was erected in 1844. The swiped brick building, featured a protruding, post borne roof over a porch. It had two wings with low brick tiled gable roof.

In 1847 Nebelong designed the Santa's Boys School in Rosenkrantz. It had a brick facade with round arched window openings.

== Gallery ==
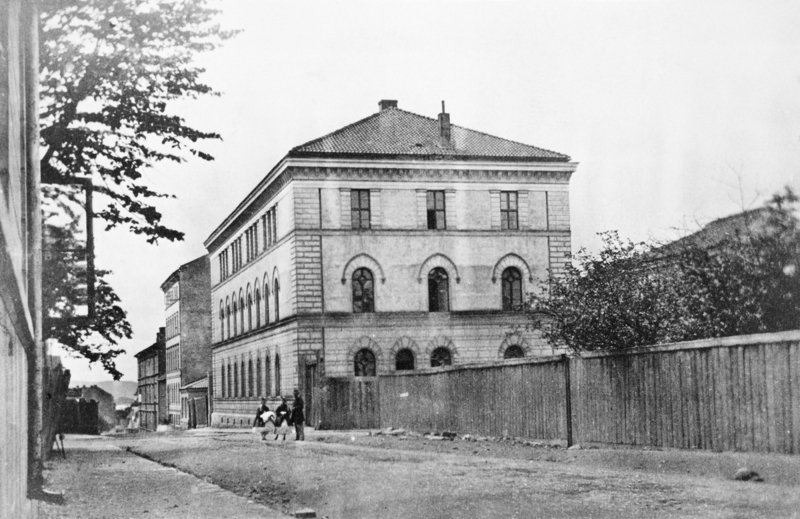
Rosenkrantz Gate 7 in Oslo

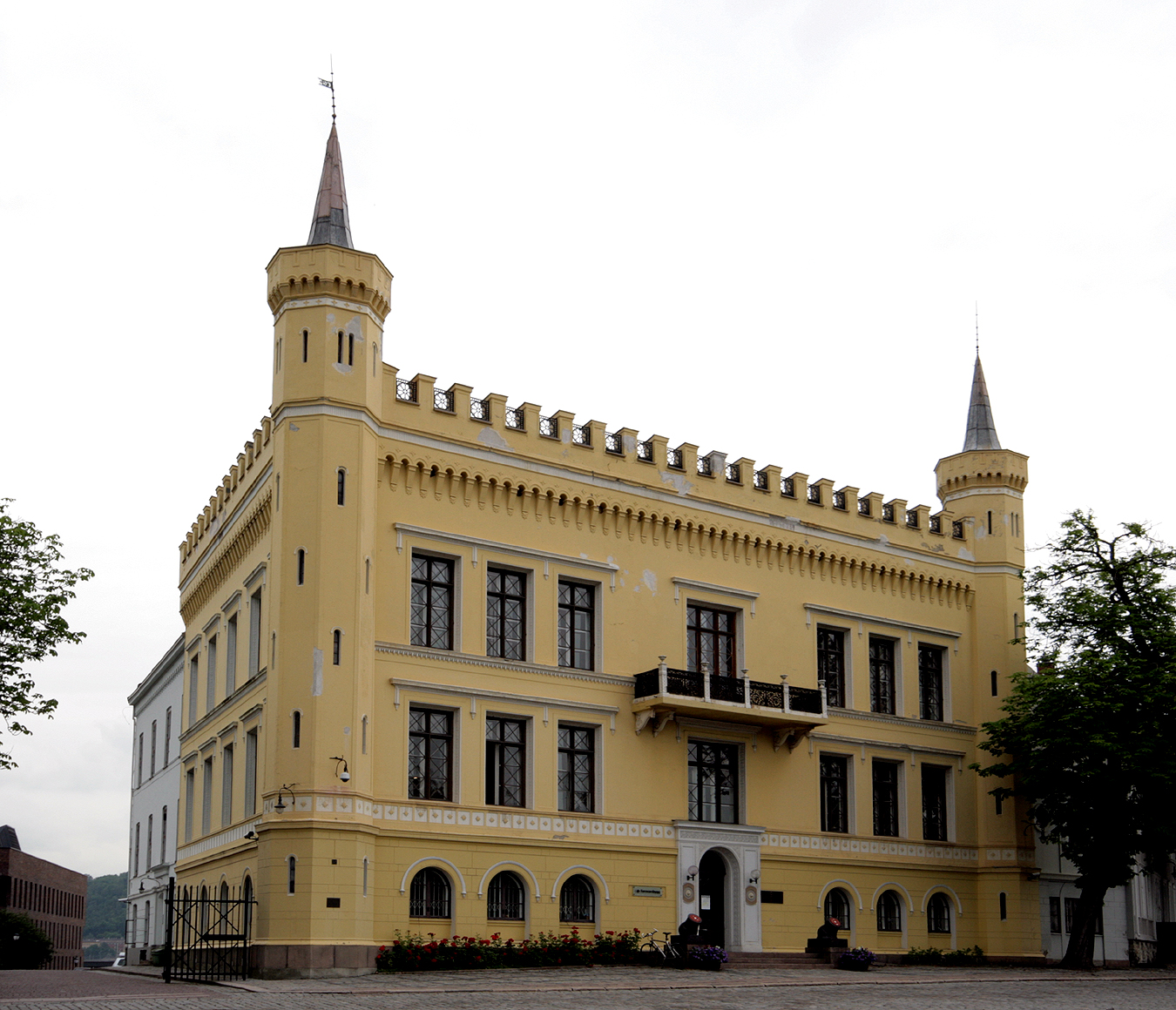
General Glads gård at Akershus

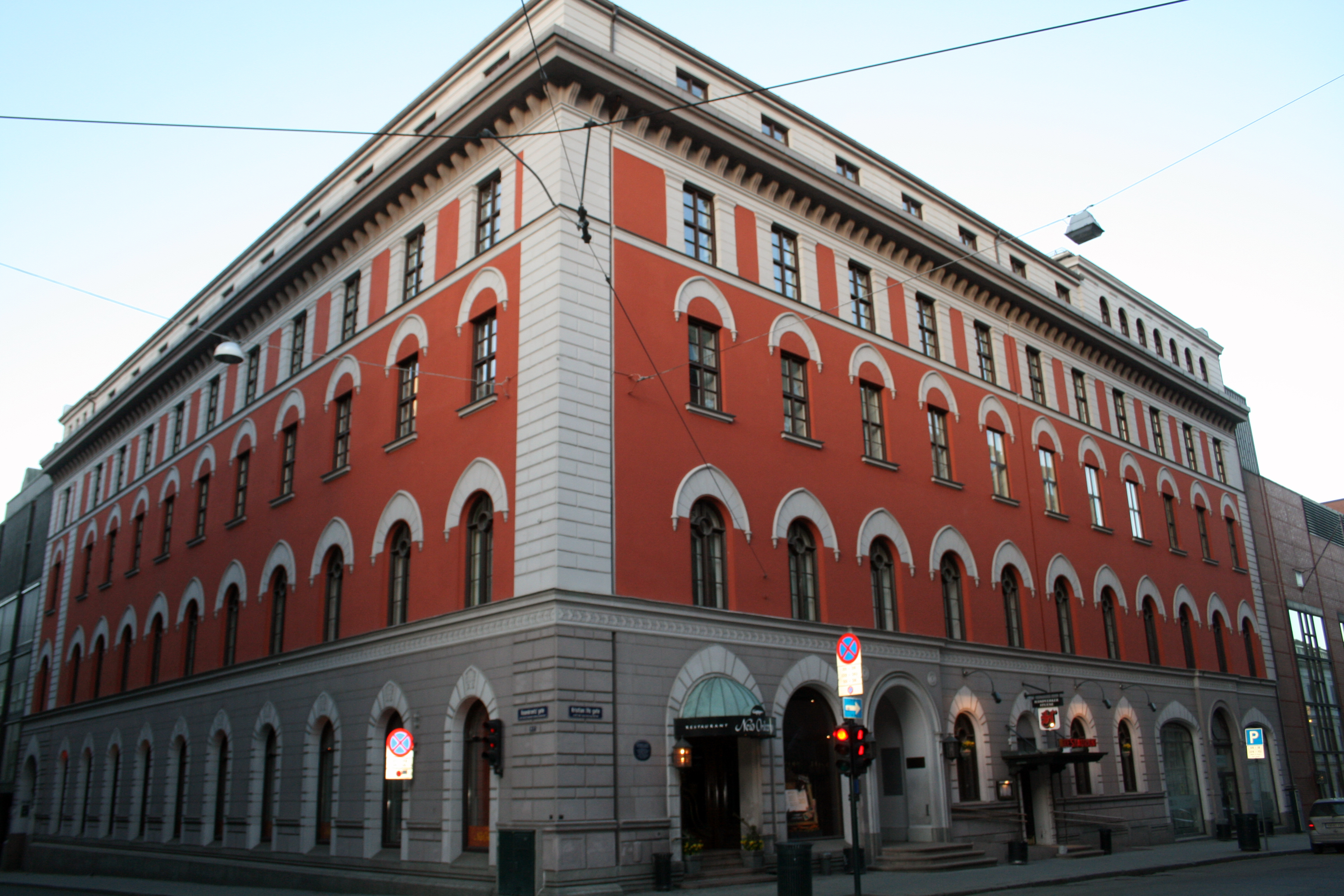
Håndverkeren in Oslo.

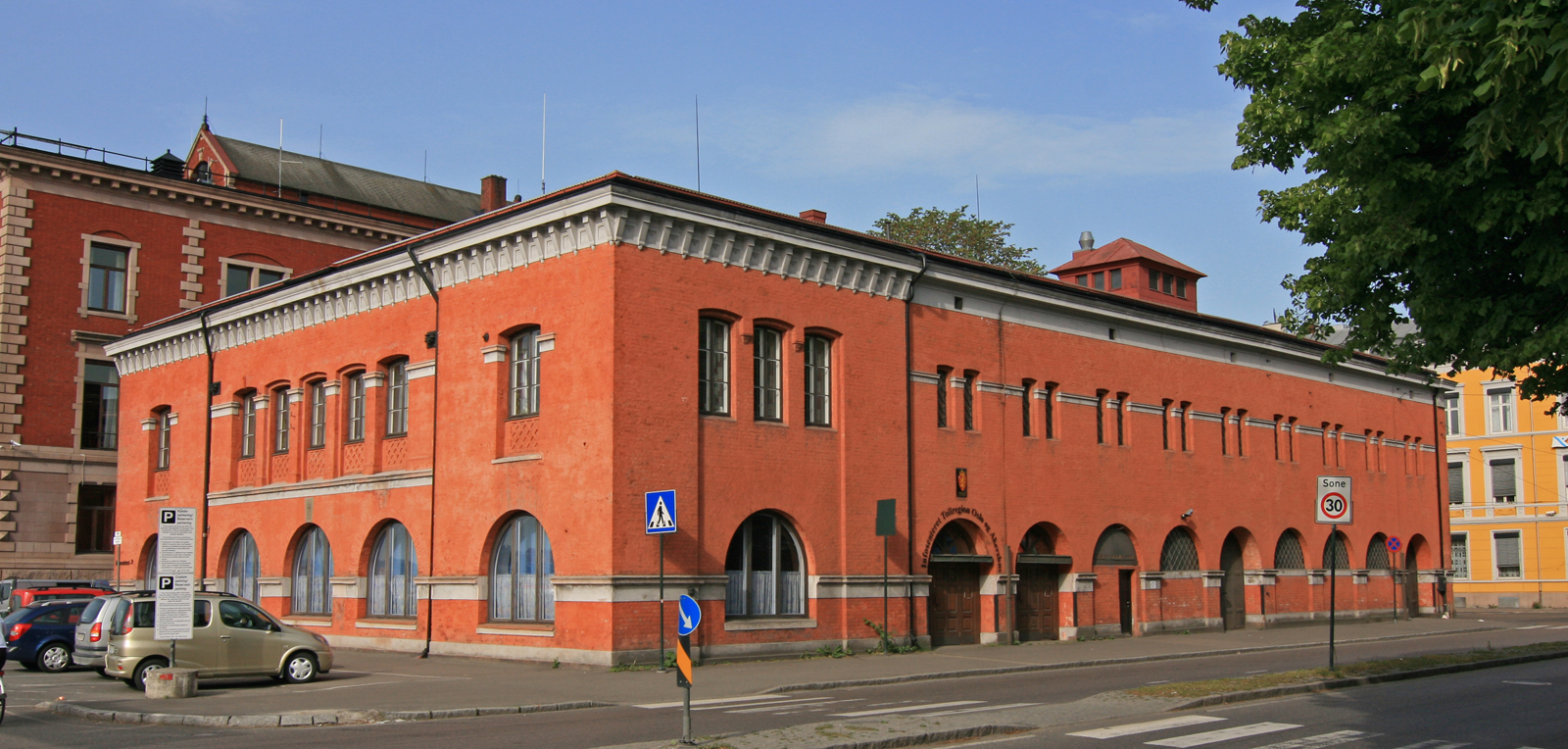
Tollbugata 1a in Oslo

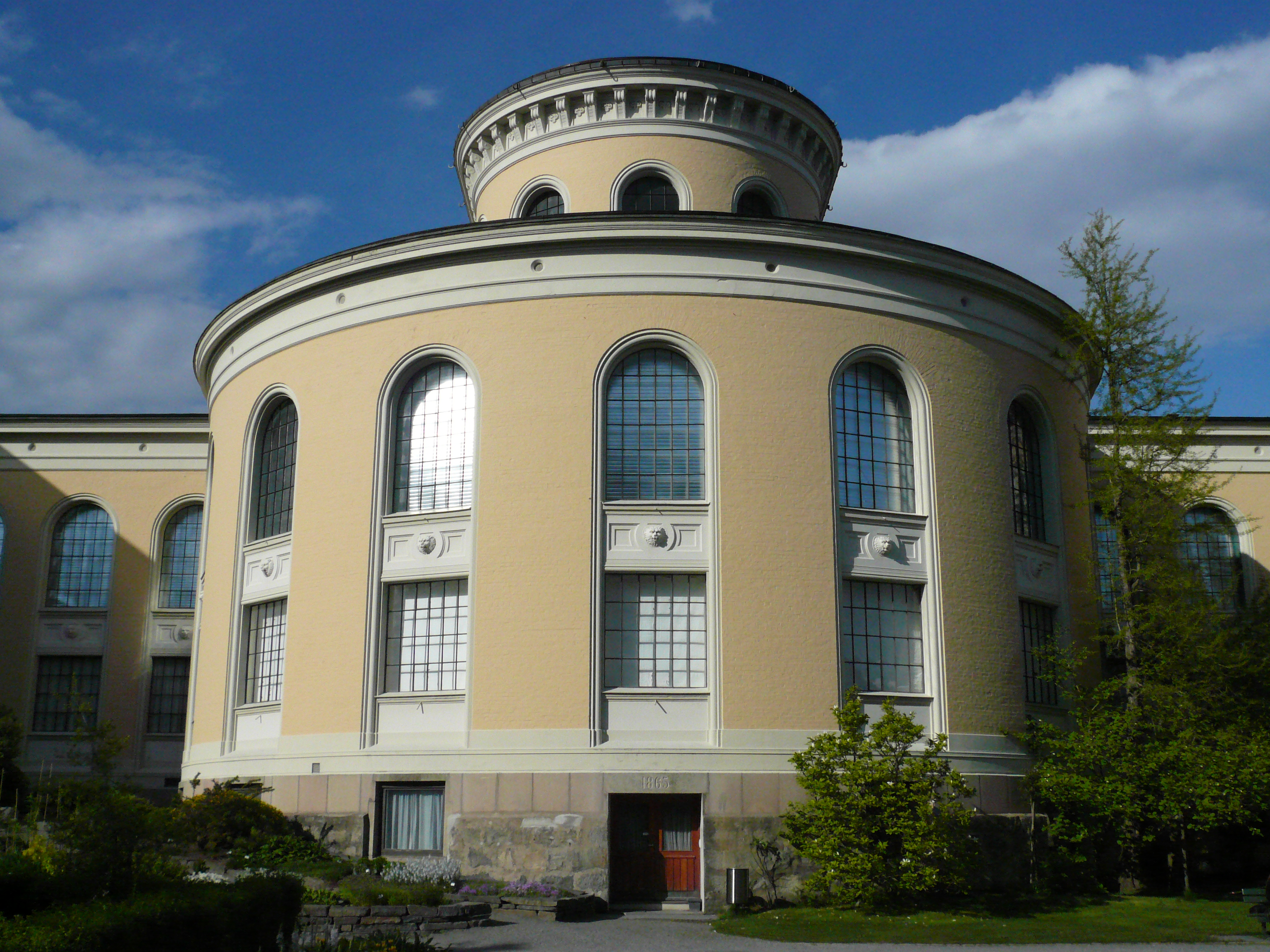
Bergen Museum

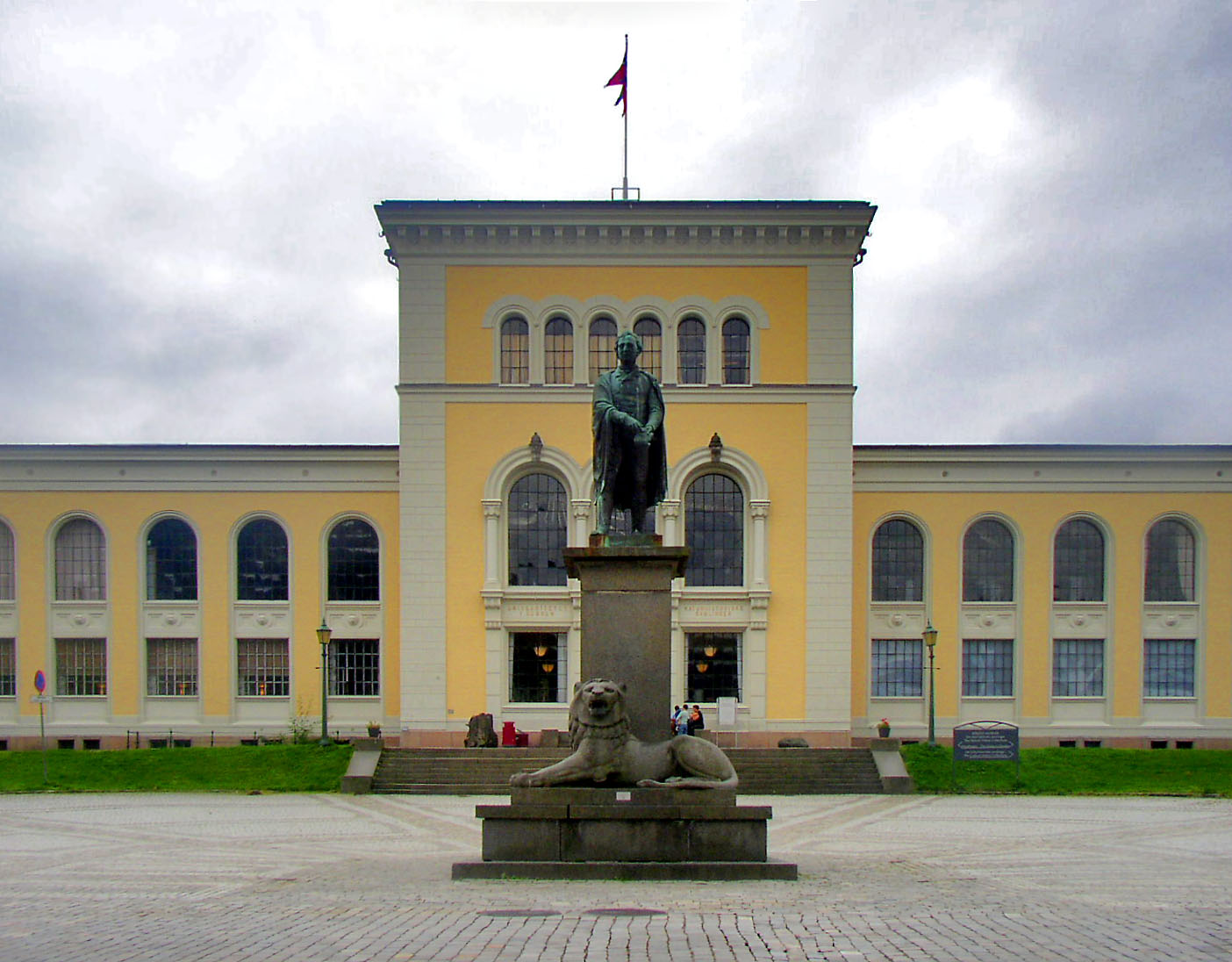
Bergen University
