= Frederik Holst (physician) =

Norwegian medical doctor (1791–1871)

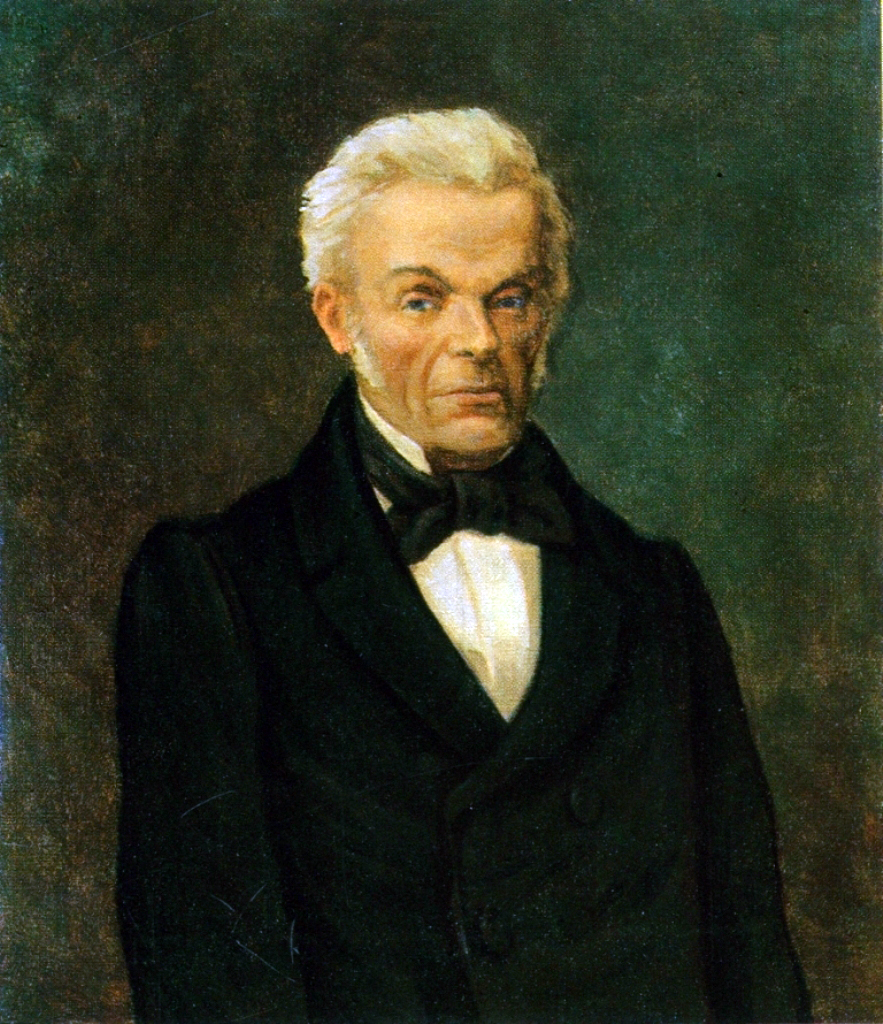
Frederik Holst

Frederik Holst (14 August 1791 – 4 June 1871) was a Norwegian medical doctor. He is regarded as an important pioneer in medicine in Norway.

== Biography ==
Holst was born at Holmestrand in Vestfold, Norway. He was the son of merchant Hans Holst (1763–1846) and Inger Christine Backer (1765–1850).

He completed his examen artium at Oslo Cathedral School in 1810. He studied at the University of Copenhagen and earned his medical diploma based upon his doctoral thesis about the then-common and now-extinct skin disease radesyke, known in Latin as lepra norvegica (1817).

He was appointed city physician (stadsfysikus) in Christiania (now Oslo) from 1817. He was Professor of Pharmacology, Toxicology and Hygiene at the University of Christiania (now University of Oslo) from 1824 until 1865. His works had significant influence on the treatment of prisoners and of patients with mental disorders. Together with Michael Skjelderup, he started and published Eyrt, the first Norwegian medical journal (1826). In 1831, he was elected a member of the Royal Swedish Academy of Sciences. He was one of the founders of the Norwegian Medical Society in Oslo (1833).

== Personal life ==
He was made a knight in the Order of St. Olav (1847), Commander of St. Olav's Order (1865) and Commander of the Order of the Polar Star. In 1824, he married Dorothea Christierne Steffens (1805–1866). Holst was the grandfather of linguist Clara Holst and professor Axel Holst.
