= Christen Heiberg (physician) =

Norwegian surgeon (1799–1872)

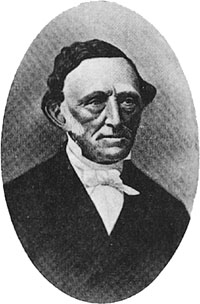
- Born: 28 November 1799; Bergen, Norway
- Died: 18 March 1872 (aged 72); Oslo, Norway
- Education: University of Oslo
- Occupations: surgeon and professor
- Children: Hjalmar Heiberg
- Relatives: Jean Heiberg (grandson)

Christen Heiberg (28 November 1799 – 18 March 1872) was a Norwegian surgeon and professor most known for bringing modern anesthesia to Norway. He was one of the first surgeons born in Norway.

== Biography ==
=== Studies ===
Heiberg was born in Bergen, Norway. He was the son of Christopher Heiberg (1767–1811) and Margrethe Heide Fritzner (1772–1816). He attended Bergen Cathedral School, graduating in 1817. He was among the first to study medicine at the Royal Frederick University (now University of Oslo), from which he graduated in 1822. Heiberg was part of a physiographic association there, along with Niels Henrik Abel, Balthazar Mathias Keilhau, Christian Peder Bianco Boeck, Jens Johan Hjort (1798–1873), and Bernt Wilhelm Schenck. He followed with a study trip to Copenhagen from 1823 to 1824 together with fellow student Christian Wisbech, also from Bergen.

=== Surgeon and professor ===
He began working as a physician at the newly founded Rikshospitalet in 1826 and published quarterly reports. The same year, he founded the medical association Lægevidenskabelig Journal-Læseselskab together with 13 colleagues. In 1828, Heiberg became lector of medicine at the Royal Frederick University, later receiving his doctorate in 1830; his thesis was a treatment of eye surgery. He helped found the Christiania Medical Association in 1833, which later became the Norwegian Medical Society. After further study in Germany and Paris during 1835, he was appointed professor of surgery and eye diseases (after Magnus Andreas Thulstrup) at the University of Christiania from 1836 as well as senior consultant physician at Rikshospitalet. He traveled to Vienna in 1845 and Berlin in 1857. In 1849, Heiberg became the first in the country to use chloroform on patients.

He later competed with Norwegian physician Gerhard Armauer Hansen to find the cause of leprosy; Heiberg died in 1872, the year before Hansen discovered the bacteria Mycobacterium leprae, and was buried in Our Saviour's Cemetery in Oslo.

=== Family ===
In 1825, he married Johanne Marie Wilhelmine Alida Heiberg (1803–1869). They were the parents of professor Hjalmar Heiberg (1837–1897) and grandparents of artist Jean Heiberg (1884–1976). His brother Johan Fritzner Heiberg (1805–1883) was also a surgeon. His nephew Jacob Munch Heiberg was also a physician who gave his name to the Heiberg-Esmarch maneuver (jaw-thrust maneuver), a technique used for airway management in unconscious or anesthetized patients, described in 1873. After Christen Heiberg's death, his nephew was one of the applicants for the professorship, which went to Johan Storm Aubert Hjort.

=== Heiberggården ===
He owned an estate on the corner of Karl Johans gate and Rosenkrantz' gate in Oslo, known as Heiberggården and built in 1844 by Danish architect Johan Henrik Nebelong. It is number 31 in the Karl Johan Quarter. He himself lived on the second floor, while educator Anton Martin Schweigaard lived on the first floor. From 1848 to 1851, educator Fredrik Glad Balchen ran his newly established deaf school there. With other landowners, Heiberg became co-owner of the opposite plot of land (known as the Gårdeiertomten), which is now the park Studenterlunden. After Heiberg's death in 1872, Heiberggården was bought by confectioner Julius Fritzner, who added an extra floor and opened the Grand Hotel in 1874.

=== Heibergløkka ===
In 1848, he had a summer residence built at Tøyen, one of the country's first Swiss villas. These "Heiberg houses" (two houses connected by a gallery) were also designed by Johan Henrik Nebelong. The surrounding area was called Heibergløkka, and is today the only remaining of twenty "professor parks" (professorløkker) that were built after the area was regulated (by royal decree). After the Municipality of Oslo took them over in 1935, they became community centers for a time. The villas were restored in 1964 and the Heibergløkka Daycare was established, which is still in operation as of 2013.

=== Awards. ===
He was decorated Knight of the Order of St. Olav in 1853, and Commander in 1866. He was a Knight of the Swedish Order of the Polar Star.
