= Clara Holst =

Norwegian academic (1868–1935)

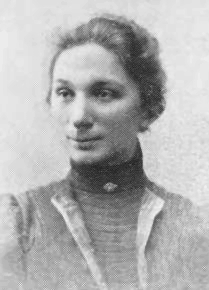
Clara Holst.

Clara Holst (4 June 1868 – 15 November 1935) was a Norwegian philologist and women's rights pioneer.

She was born in Kristiania as a daughter of physician Axel Holst (1826–1880) and German citizen Anna Mathilde Charlotte Flemming (1832–1897). She was a granddaughter of Frederik Holst, sister of Axel Holst and aunt of Peter Midelfart Holst.

She finished her secondary education as a private candidate in 1889, and had attended Nissens School. The next year, in 1890, she became the first female philology student at the Royal Frederick University, Norway's only university at the time. She was the first woman to take the cand.philol. degree in Norway, in 1896, and the first to take a doctorate at a Norwegian university. Her academic advisor was Johan Storm, whose acquaintances enabled her to study at Cambridge in 1892, Sorbonne in 1893, Leipzig in 1897, Copenhagen in 1898–99 and Berlin in 1902–03.

She finished the dr.philos. degree in 1903 with the thesis Studier over middelnedertyske laaneord i dansk i det 14. og 15. aarhundrede. She thereby followed in the footsteps of her grandfather, who in 1817 became the first person to take a doctorate in the independent Norway. Johan Storm was a doctoral opponent together with Hjalmar Falk and Sophus Bugge. Holst had short tenures as a German teacher at the Royal Frederick University and Aars og Voss school in 1904 and 1906. She lectured at Wellesley College from 1906 to 1907 and the University of Kansas in Lawrence from 1907 to 1908.

Holst then retired and returned to lead a quiet life in Norway. She was unmarried, and resided in Fagerborg with her two older sisters Anna Amalie and Thea. She died in her hometown in November 1935.
