= Axel Holst =

Norwegian Professor of Hygiene and Bacteriology

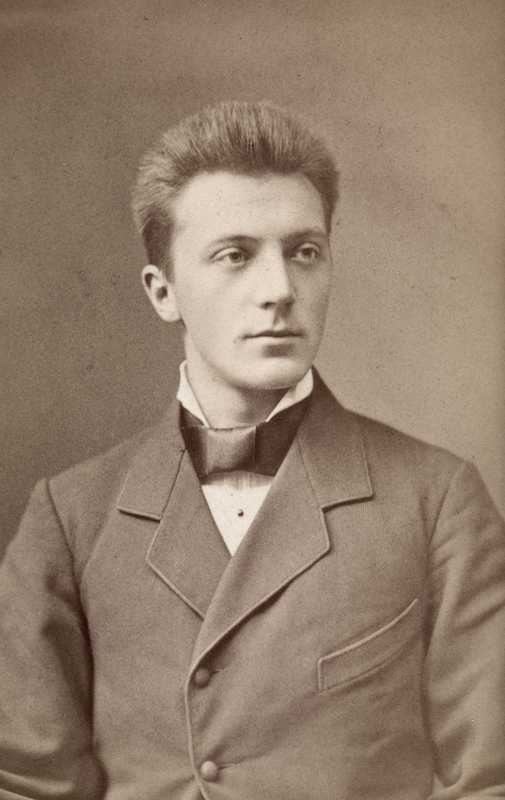
- Axel Holst
- Born: 6 September 1860; Oslo, Norway
- Died: 26 April 1931 (aged 70); Oslo, Norway
- Education: University of Oslo
- Known for: Treatment of Beriberi and Scurvy
- Scientific career
- Fields: Pathology
- Workplaces: University of Oslo

Axel Holst (6 September 1860 – 26 April 1931) was a Norwegian Professor of Hygiene and Bacteriology at the University of Oslo. He was most known for his contributions to the study of the treatment of Beriberi and Scurvy.

== Biography ==
Holst was born in Christiania (now Oslo), Norway. He was the son of Axel Holst (1826–80) and Anna Mathilde Charlotte Flemming (1832–97). He was the brother of the linguist Clara Holst and grandson of Frederik Holst. Both his father and grandfather were physicians.

Holst attended Christiania Cathedral School (1877). He studied at Royal Frederick University (now University of Oslo) gaining his cand.med. in 1884. In 1887, he was awarded the Crown Prince's gold medal (Kronprinsens gullmedalje). He was granted his doctorate in 1892 involving the bacterium streptococcus.

He was an assistant at the National Institute of Pathological Anatomy from 1885-89. During 1890-1892, he studied at various European laboratories including visits at Kiel, Berlin, Munich and Paris. He was appointed health inspector in Christiania from 1892-93. He was appointed Professor of Hygiene and Bacteriology at the University of Kristiania from 1893. He was also director of the university's newly established Hygiene Institute until his retirement in 1930. He died in Oslo during 1931 at age 70.

== Research ==
Throughout his career, Holst made many other contributions, writing numerous medical books and articles related to sanitation, health and practical hygiene. Holst conducted his most notable research work with Theodor Frølich (1870-1947) who was a professor of pediatrics at the university. Holst and Frølich suspected a nutritional deficiency for scurvy in the Norwegian fishing fleet, then called "shipboard beriberi," and thought to be a variant of beri-beri. Holst and Frølich established an animal model that allowed systematic study of factors that led to the ship-related dietary disease, as well as the preventive value of different substances.

Substituting guinea pigs for pigeons (a traditional beriberi research model) as the experimental animal for these studies was a lucky coincidence, as the guinea pig was later shown to be among the very few mammals capable of showing scurvy-like symptoms, while pigeons, as seed-eating birds, were later shown to make their own vitamin C in the liver, and could not develop scurvy. Scurvy occurred in guinea pigs when a diet was fed consisting of various types of grain, either whole or baked into bread, and these symptoms were prevented when the diet was supplemented with known antiscorbutics like fresh cabbage or lemon juice.

Their findings were published in 1907 in the Journal of Hygiene, but were unpopular within the scientific community as the concepts of nutritional deficiencies was unheard of at the time (the concept and word "vitamine" did not arrive until 1912, and was in part based upon Holst and Frølich's work). However, in the later work which led up to the isolation of vitamin C as the antiscorbutic factor in 1932-33, Holst and Frølich's guinea pig model of scurvy proved to be the key biological assay which allowed identification of the chemical substance (hexuronic acid, later called ascorbic acid) which was ascorbutic vitamin.

== Honors ==
- Honorary doctorate at Uppsala University (1927)
- Honorary doctorate at Christian-Albrecht- Universität (now University of Kiel (1928)
- Honorary doctorate at Copenhagen University (1929)

== Related reading ==
- Kenneth J. Carpenter (1988) The History of Scurvy and Vitamin C (Cambridge University) ISBN 9780521347730

Academic offices
Preceded by Bredo Henrik von Munthe af Morgenstierne	Rector of the University of Oslo; 1919–1921 (acting)	Succeeded by Fredrik Stang
