= Hjalmar Heiberg =

Norwegian physician (1837–1897)

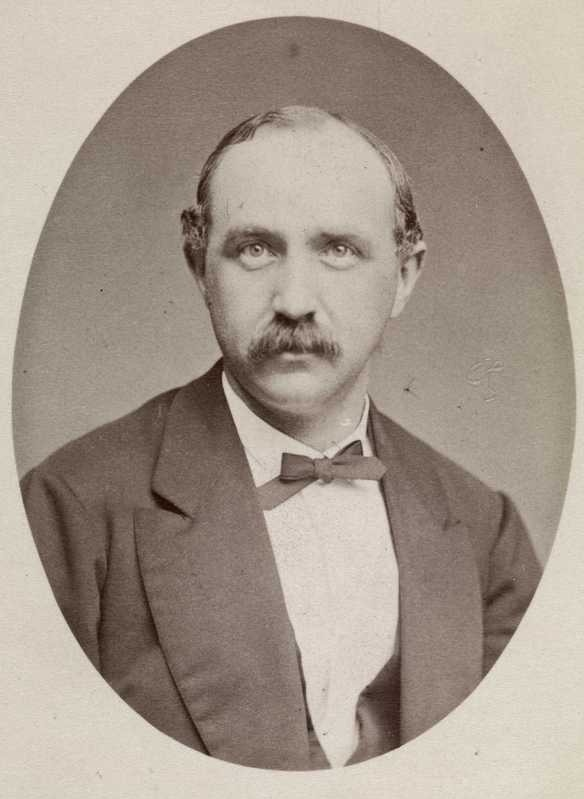
- Hjalmar Heiberg
- Born: 26 September 1837; Christiania, Norway
- Died: 25 September 1897 (aged 59)
- Occupation: Physician
- Children: Jean Heiberg
- Parent: Christen Heiberg
- Relatives: Axel Heiberg (cousin)
- Awards: Order of St. Olav

Hjalmar Heiberg (26 September 1837 – 25 September 1897) was a Norwegian physician and a professor at the University of Oslo.

== Biography ==
He was born in Christiania (now Oslo), Norway. He was the son of physician Christen Heiberg. His father was professor in surgery and general practitioner at the National Hospital (Rikshospitalet). He received his cand.med. in 1862. Heiberg was Professor of Pathological Anatomy at the University of Christiania (now University of Oslo) and from 1859 worked was an assistant to Emanuel Winge (1827–90) at the National Hospital as a pathologist and bacteriologist researcher.

He received a one-year scholarship and took a study trip to Würzburg and Vienna in 1869–70. In 1870 followed Winge as professor of pathological medicine. He was also a general practitioner at the National Hospital, and a specialist in forensic medicine. Heiberg was a proponent for the new theory of bacteria. His research speciality was the subject of inflammation and published several key articles on the field of infection, both on the basis of his own research and as a provider of foreign research.

== Personal life ==
In 1878, Heiberg married Jeanette Sophie Augusta Dahl (1848–1884). They were the parents of artist Jean Heiberg. He was decorated Knight, First Class of the Royal Norwegian Order of St. Olav in 1890 and was awarded an honorary doctorate at Lund University in 1893.
