= Jean Heiberg =

Norwegian artist (1884–1976)

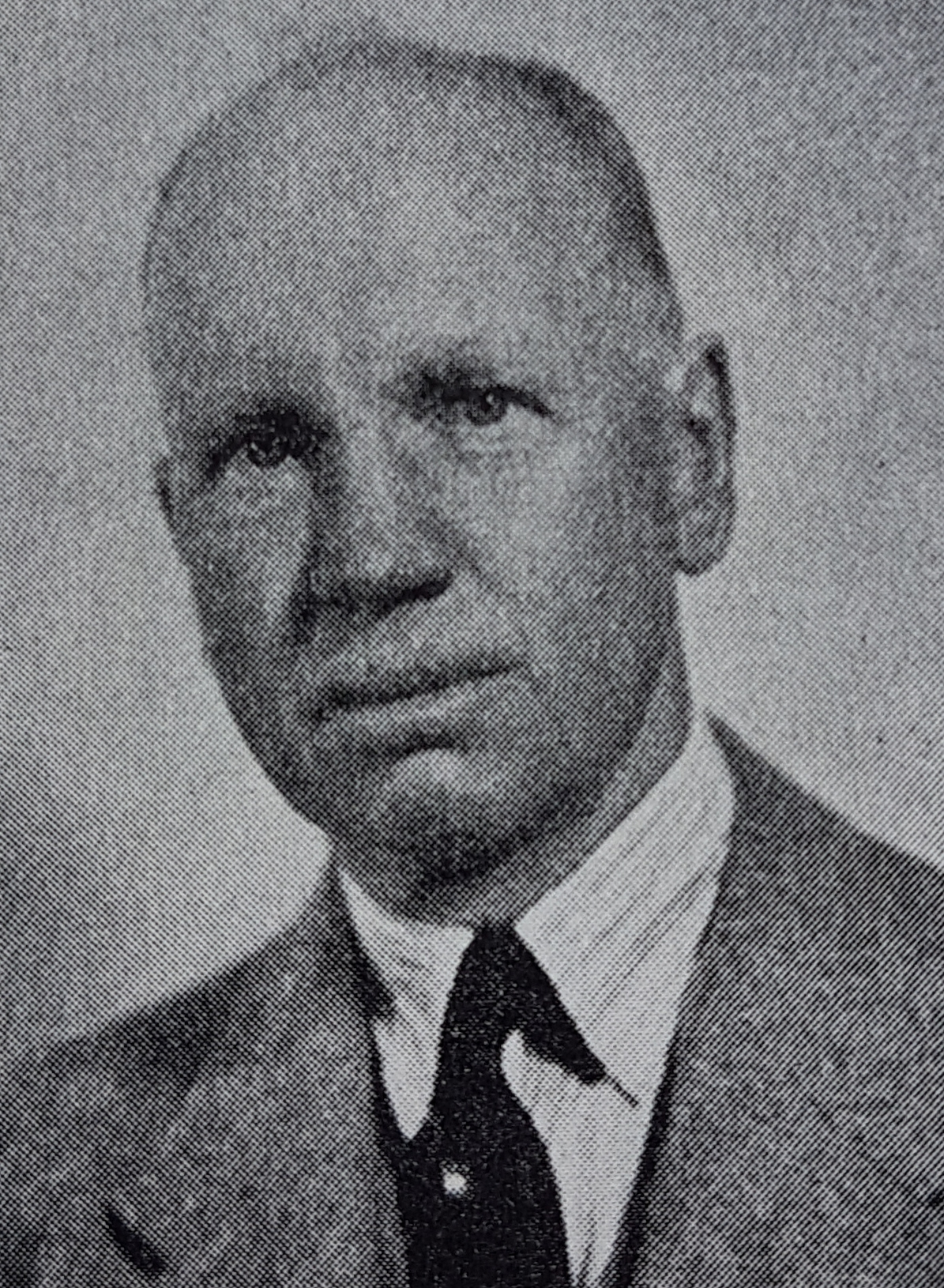
- Born: 19 December 1884; Kristiania, Norway
- Died: 27 May 1976 (aged 91)
- Occupations: painter, sculptor, designer and art professor
- Parent: Hjalmar Heiberg

Jean Hjalmar Dahl Heiberg (19 December 1884 – 27 May 1976) was a Norwegian painter, sculptor, designer and art professor.

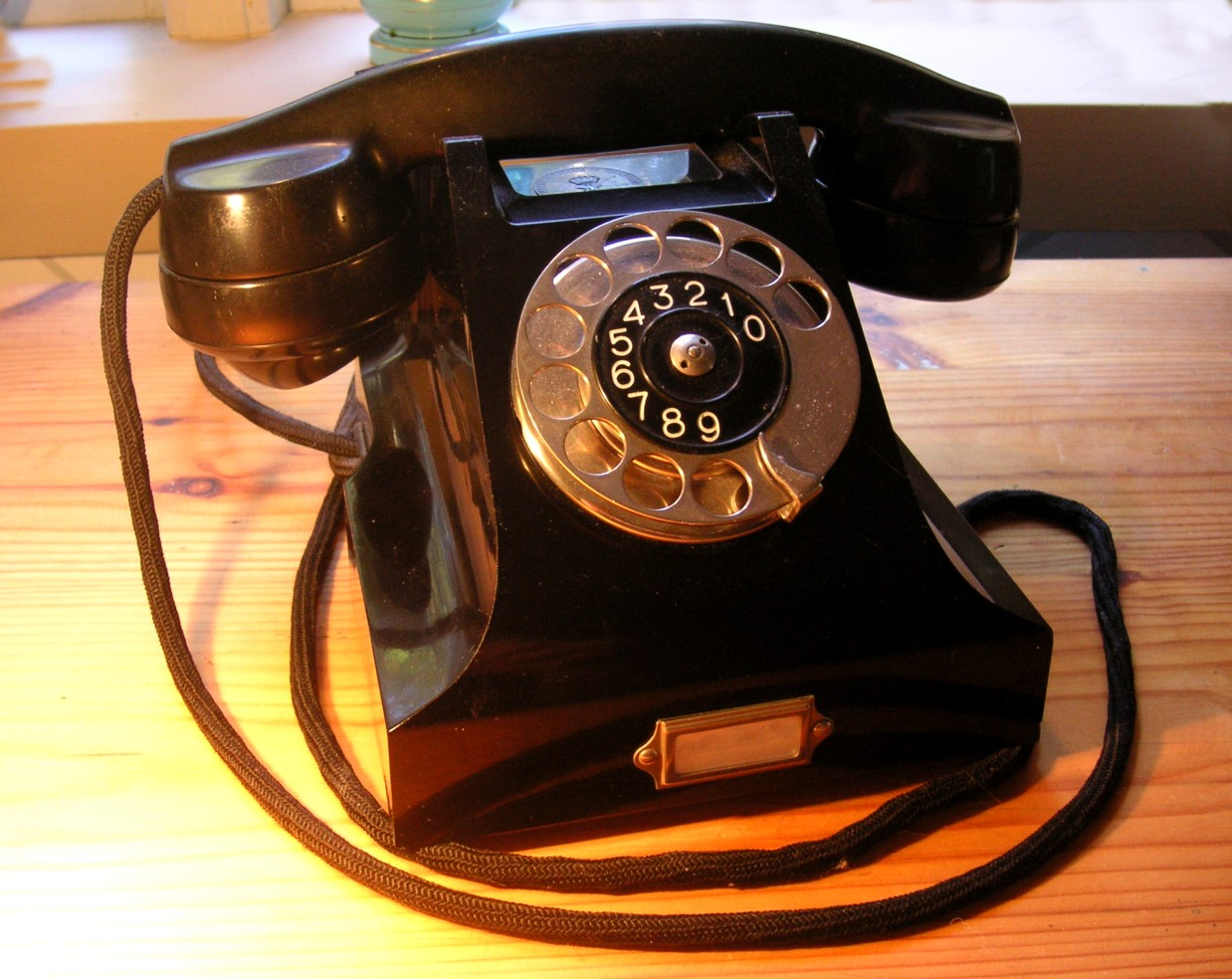
Ericsson Bakelite telephone. 1931

== Personal life ==
Heiberg was born in Kristiania (now Oslo), Norway. He was the son of Hjalmar Heiberg (1837–97) and Jeanette Sofie Augusta Dahl (1848–84). Both his father and grandfather were professors of medicine. His mother died of puerperal fever one week after his birth.

Heiberg's first wife (from 1913 to 1920) was the sculptor Sigri Welhaven. In 1922 he married the painter Agnes Mannheimer, who died in 1934. In 1954 he married Anna Cleve (1916–1996).

== Career ==
Heiberg finished his secondary education at Hamar in 1903. He studied at the Royal Drawing School (Den Kongelige Tegneskole) in Kristiania from 1903 to 1904, and in Munich from 1904 to 1905. He studied at the Académie Colarossi in Paris in 1905. After a period in Kristiania, he moved to Paris again, and was a student of Henri Matisse from 1908 to 1910. After his marriage in 1913, the couple stayed in Rome and Florence the following year.

Among Heiberg's paintings are Boksekamp from 1910 and Enken from 1915, which are both located in National Gallery of Norway. Other paintings include Mor og barn and Eftasvæl, both from 1916. His self-portrait Selvportrett ved staffeliet is also located at the National Gallery. He is represented at the National Gallery with a total of 30 paintings and several sculptures. Among his bronze sculptures are Helge from 1925 and Hode from 1928. In the 1920s he also designed pieces of furniture.

In the early 1930s he co-designed a telephone for Elektrisk Bureau. It was claimed to be the world's first "hookless" bakelite telephone; that is, the first telephone where the cradle, or receiver hook, was integrated into the all-bakelite body. The phone went into production in 1932 as the Ericsson model DBH1001. The engineering design of this model was made by Norwegian electrical engineer Johan Christian Bjerknes (1889–1983). Heiberg was responsible for the stylistic design.

Heiberg was appointed a professor at the Norwegian National Academy of Fine Arts from 1935 to 1955, except during the occupation of Norway by Nazi Germany, when he was fired in 1941. In autumn 1941 he started secretly running an undercover art academy in Oslo, together with fellow professor Axel Revold. Their academy was called "The Factory" (Norwegian: Fabrikken) because its first location was in a closed corset factory. It was later located at Lauritz Falk's home and at Johannes Sejersted Bødtker's atelier at Holmenkollen. Heiberg was the director of the Norwegian National Academy of Fine Arts from 1946 to 1955. In 1956 he was decorated Commander of the Royal Norwegian Order of St. Olav.

== Related reading ==
- Fallan, Kjetil (2010). Design History: Understanding Theory and Method. New York: Berg Publishers. ISBN 9781847887030. OCLC 988782268.
- Fiell, Charlotte; Fiell, Peter (2005). Design of the 20th Century (25th anniversary ed.). Köln: Taschen. p. 319. ISBN 9783822840788. OCLC 809539744.
