= Knut Brautaset =

Norwegian engineer

Knut Brautaset (born 16 September 1939) is a Norwegian engineer.

He worked as a civil engineer in Detroit, Michigan from 1965 to 1970. When moving back to Norway in 1970, he was hired at the Southern Norway Technical School, which changed its name to Agder Regional College of Engineering (Norwegian: Agder ingeniør- og distriktshøgskole). From 1982 to 1989 he was the rector of this Grimstad-based college. When Agder University College was created through a merger of the region's colleges in 1994, Brautaset became the first rector there, and served until 2000. He has also been the board chairman of the Norwegian Centre for International Cooperation in Higher Education for six years.

He resides in Grimstad.

Academic offices
Preceded by Gunnar Aultun	Rector of Agder Regional College of Engineering; 1982–1989	Succeeded by Karen Junker Ohldieck
Preceded by position created	Rector of Agder University College; 1994–2000	Succeeded by Ernst Håkon Jahr
