= Magnus Andreas Thulstrup =

Norwegian surgeon

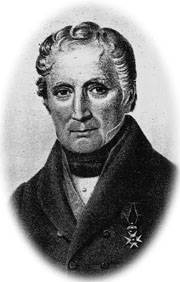
Magnus Andreas Thulstrup

Magnus Andreas Thulstrup (13 April 1769 – 18 May 1844) was a Norwegian surgeon. From 1814, he was a professor of surgery and obstetrics at the University of Oslo. From 1826, he was chief surgeon at Oslo University Hospital, Rikshospitalet. He served as a member of the commission for pharmaceutical legislation and The Norwegian Medical Society (Det Norske Medicinske Selskab). He was one of the first professors at the University of Christiania. His background was in the military field cutting profession, which developed into modern-day anatomy and surgery. His military doctor's career culminated in 1819 with the position of Norwegian general surgeon.

He was married to Eleonore, f. Clauson-Kaas.
