= Michael Skjelderup =

Norwegian physician and educator

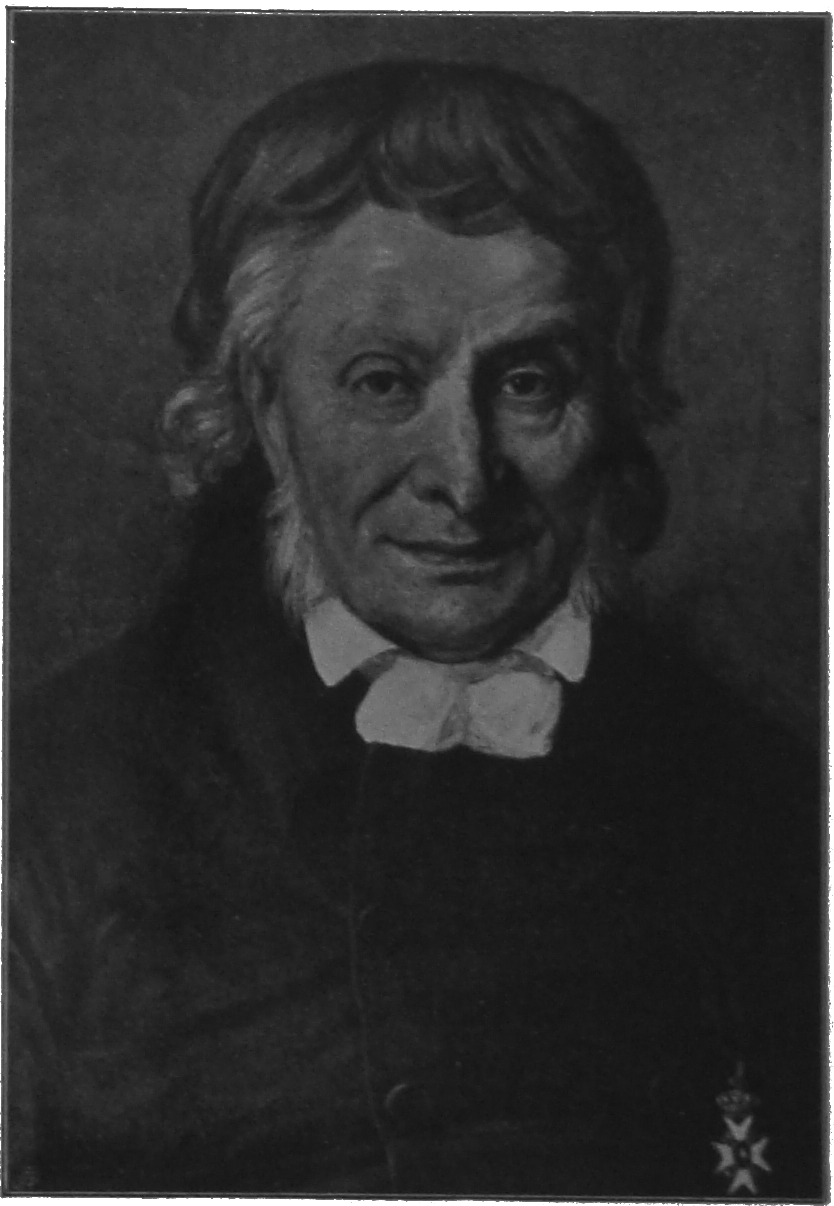
Michael Skjelderup (1769–1852)

Michael Skjelderup (22 October 1769 – 16 April 1852) was a Norwegian physician and educator.

Skjelderup was born in the parish of Hof in Vestfold, Norway. He graduated from the Royal Danish Academy of Surgery (1794) and first held a position as a professor at the University of Copenhagen (1805–14). He subsequently became a professor at the University of Oslo (1815 - 1849). He was the father of Norwegian Government minister Jacob Worm Skjelderup.
